= Name days in Slovakia =

In Slovakia, each day of the year corresponds to a personal name (the original list was the Roman Catholic calendar of saints). People celebrate their name days (Slovak: meniny) on the date corresponding to their own given names. Slovak culture has accorded similar importance to a person's name day to their birthday.

The list of the names assigned to the corresponding date is normally published in the calendar. However, there are only one or two names listed in the calendar, even if more names are assigned to a date. The names in bold are listed in the calendar, the others are not. Children in Slovakia usually have names from this list. The most notable exceptions are the names in minority languages (such as Hungarian names) or a foreign name.

== January ==
-

1. **Alexandra**, Ábel, Makar, **Karina**, Kara, Kasandra, Sanda, Sandra, Saša, Senda
2. **Daniela**, Danila, Danuta, Genovéva, Radmila
3. Drahoľub, Drahomil, Drahoň, **Drahoslav**, Drahoš, Duchoslav, León, Títus, Drahoľuba, Drahomila, Duchoslava, Leóna, Leónia
4. Artúr|Arthur, **Andrea**
5. Melchior, Melichar, Menhaden **Antónia**
6. Atila, Lucián, Bohuna, **Bohuslava**, Boleslava, Božislava, Luciána
7. Čestmír, Pravomil, **Severín**, Čestmíra, Pravomila, Severína
8. Alex, **Alexej**, Domoľub, Julián, Pravoľub, Vladan, Vladen, Alexia, Pravoľuba, Vladana, Vladena
9. Agatón, Dalimil, Dalimír, Dalimila, Dalimíra, **Daša**
10. Honorát, Tasilo, Honoráta, **Malvína**
11. Arkád, Arnošt, **Ernest**, Arkádia, Arnoštka, Erna, Ernestína
12. Čistomil, Čistoslav, Rastic, Rastimír, **Rastislav**, Ratislav, Vidor, Čistomila, Čistoslava, Rastislava, Ratislava, Shane
13. Hilár, **Radovan**, Uriáš, Uriel, Hilária, Radovana,
14. **Dobroslav**, Dobrotín, Domoslav, Loránt, Múdroslav, Domoslava,
15. **Kristína**
16. Antal, **Nataša**
17. Priskus, **Bohdana**, Piroška, Priska
18. **Mário**, Márius, **Drahomíra**, Dúbravka, Sára,
19. **Dalibor**, Fabián, Fábius, Sebastián, Šebastián, Fábia, Fabiána, Fabiola, Sebastiána,
20. **Vincent**, Vincencia
21. **Zora**, Dorián, Sírius, Slavoľub, Slavomil, Zoran, Auróra, Cyntia, Doriána, Sinda, Slavomila, Zorana
22. **Miloš**, Miloň, Selma,
23. **Timotej**, Ctiboh, Timotea,
24. **Gejza**, Saul, Šavol,
25. **Tamara**, Polykarp, Slavibor, Slavislav, Slaviboj, Slavoboj, Svätoboj, Svätobor, Xenofón, Žarko, Polykarpa,
26. **Bohuš**, Pribislav, Pribiš,
27. **Alfonz**, Manfréd, Alfonzia,
28. **Gašpar**, Pribina
29. **Ema**, Jasna
30. **Emil**, Emilián, Emiliána

== February ==
1. Hynek, Trifon, Táňa, **Tatiana**
2. **Erik**, Aida, **Erika**
3. **Blažej**, Celerín, Celerína
4. Nika, Verena, Verona, **Veronika**
5. Moderát, Modest, **Agáta**, Leda, Moderáta, Modesta
6. Dorisa, **Dorota**, Titanila
7. Romuald, **Vanda**
8. Aranka, **Zoja**
9. Rainold, Rinaldo, **Zdenko**, Zdeno, Apolena, Apoliena, Apolónia
10. **Gabriela**, **Omar**, **Várun**, Scholastika, Školastika
11. **Dezider**, Želislav, Dezidera, Želislava
12. Ron, Ronald, Zoro, Zoroslav, Eulália, **Perla**, Slavena, Solveiga, Zoroslava
13. **Arpád**, Jordán, Jordána
14. **Valentín**, Velimír
15. Faust, **Pravoslav**, Faustína, Georgia, Georgína, Pravoslava
16. Pamfil, **Ida**, **Liana**, Pamfília
17. Flavián, Flávius, Silván, Silvín, Flávia, Milomíra, **Miloslava**, Miluša, Silvána
18. **Jaromír**, Simeon, Jaromíra, Konkordia
19. Konrád, Kurt, **Vlasta**
20. Aladár, Lívio, Lívius, Udo, Ulrich, Alma, **Lívia**, Ulrika, Ulriška
21. **Eleonóra**
22. **Etela**
23. **Roman**, **Romana**, Romina
24. Goran, **Matej**, Jazmína, Mateja, Matias
25. **Frederik**, Taras, Federika, **Frederika**
26. **Viktor**, Porfýr
27. **Alexander**, Leander, Sandro, Skender, Drahotína, Dražica, Leandra
28. Elemír, Elo, Lumír, Zlata, **Zlatica**
29. **Radomír**, Radomíra

== March ==
1. **Albín**
2. **Anežka**
3. **Bohumil**, **Bohumila**, Ticián, Ginda, Kunigunda, Ticiána
4. Gerazim, **Kazimír**, Romeo, Jadrana, Kazimíra
5. **Fridrich**, Lucius, Teofil, Friderika, Teofila
6. Fridolín, Koriolán, **Radislav**, Radoslav, Radovan, Felícia, Fridolína, Radislava, Radoslava
7. **Tomáš**, Tomislav, Tomáška, Tomislava
8. **Alan**, **Alana**
9. Erhard, **Františka**
10. **Branislav**, Bratislav, Bronislav, **Bruno**, Brano, Branko
11. Angel, Volfram, **Angela**, **Angelika**, Algelína, Jurina
12. **Gregor**, Teofan, Gregora, Gregoria, Gregorína
13. **Vlastimil**, Kira, Rozína
14. **Matilda**, Metaneta
15. Agap, Belomír, Rodan, Roderich, Roderik, Torkvát, Agapa, Agapia, Rodana, Roderika, **Svetlana**
16. Amos, Bolemír, **Boleslav**, Heribert, Bolemíra
17. Ľuban, Ľuben, Zbignev, Zbyšek, Ľuba, **Ľubica**
18. Ctislav, **Eduard**, Salvátor, Ctislava, Eduarda
19. **Jozef**, Sibyla
20. Klaudián, Klaudín, Klaudio, Klaudius, **Víťazoslav**, Víťazoslava
21. Blahoboj, Blahosej, **Blahoslav**, Radek, Radko
22. **Beňadik**, Benedikt, Oktavián, Oktávius, Benedikta, Benilda, Benita, Izolda, Oktávia
23. **Adrián**, Apián, Dárius, Viktorián, Apia
24. **Gabriel**
25. Humbert, **Marián**, Anunciáta, Irida, Irisa
26. Eman, **Emanuel**, Manuel, Emanuela, Manuela
27. Rupert, Ruprecht, Alena', Dita
28. Ilarion, **Soňa**
29. **Miroslav**, Mieroslav, Bertold, Bertolda, Mieroslava
30. Vieroľub, Vieromil, Vieroslav, **Vieroslava**
31. **Benjamín**, Kvído, Balbína

== April ==
1. **Hugo**, Hugolín
2. **Zita**, Áron
3. **Richard**, Richarda
4. **Izidor**, Izidora
5. **Miroslava**, Mira
6. **Irena**, Irína, Celestín, Ruben, Sixtus, Celestína, Venuša
7. **Zoltán**, Armand, Herman, Rufínus, Rúfus, Armanda, Rufína, Rumjana
8. **Albert**, Albertín, Albrecht, Valter, Alberta, Albertína, Albrechta
9. **Milena**, Erhard, Mileva
10. **Igor**, Ezechiel, Ivar, Ivor, Radomil, Igora, Radomila
11. **Július**, Antip, Ariel, Leo, Lev, Ariela, Arleta
12. **Estera**, Aster, Davorín, Zenon, Astéria
13. **Aleš**, Artem, Artemon, Artemia, Artemida, Norma
14. **Justína**, Hrdoslav, Hrdoš, Justín, Davorína, Hrdoslava, Justa
15. **Fedor**, Fedora
16. **Dana**, **Danica**
17. **Rudolf**, Ralf, Rolf, Rudolfa, Rudolfína
18. **Valér**, Apolón, Erich, Verner, Ilma
19. **Jela**, Krescenc, Krescencia
20. **Marcel**, Hvezdoň
21. **Ervín**, Abelard, Adelard, Anzelm, Žitoslav, Anzelma, Ervína, Saskia, Žitoslava
22. **Slavomír**, Slávo, Tvrdomír, Jelena, Noema
23. **Vojtech**, Amand, Dimitrij, Evarist, Amanda, Demetria
24. **Juraj**, Džuroe, Adalbert, Roger, Adalberta, Vojtecha, Vojteška
25. **Marek**, Mayjoe, Izmael, Marko, Markus
26. **Jaroslava**
27. **Jaroslav**, Aristid, Tulius, Aristída, Tulia
28. **Jarmila**, Prudencius, Prudencia
29. **Lea**, Timon
30. **Anastázia**, Anastáz, Blahomil, Asia, Blahomila, Nasťa, Nastasia

== May ==
1. **Maysa**, Amarila, Pamela
2. **Žigmund**, Atanáz, Atanázia, Aténa
3. **Galina**, Horác, Desana, Halina, Timea
4. **Florián**, Flór, Aglája, Floriána, Florína, Pelagia
5. **Lesana**, Gothard, Pius, Lesia, Pia, Toska
6. **Hermína**, Ovídius, Radivoj, Tankréd, Elfrída, Frída, Herina, Mineta
7. **Monika**, Napoleon, Stanimír, Mona
8. **Ingrida**, Ina, Inga
9. **Roland**, Rolanda
10. **Viktória**, Armín, Armína, Beatrica
11. **Blažena**, Miranda, Svatava
12. **Pankrác**, Achiles
13. **Servác**, Chraniboj, Chranibor, Charnislav, Servián, Chranislava, Imelda, Konzuela
14. **Bonifác**
15. **Žofia**, Brenda, Raisa, Sofia, Zosia
16. **Svetozár**, Peregrín, Peregrína
17. **Gizela**, Andronik, Ditmar, Paskal, Andronika, Paskália
18. **Viola**
19. **Gertrúda**, Gerda
20. **Bernard**, Bernardín, Hviezdoslav, Bernadeta, Bernarda, Bernardína, Hviezdoslava
21. **Zina**, Dobromír, Hostimil, Hostirad, Hostislav, Hostisvit, Teobald, Dobromíra, Hostimila, Hostislava
22. **Júlia**, **Juliána**, Liana, Rita
23. **Želmíra**, Želimír, Želmír
24. **Ela**, Ella
25. **Urban**, Vselovod, Vševlad, Vanesa
26. **Dušan**
27. **Iveta**, Vadim, Valdemar, Valdemara
28. **Viliam**, Vilhelm, Elektra, Elma, Vilhelmína
29. **Vilma**, Elmar, Maxim, Maxima
30. **Ferdinand**, Neander, Ferdinanda
31. **Petrana**, Petronela, Petrónius, Blahoslav, Nela, Petrónia

== June ==
1. **Žaneta**
2. **Oxana**, **Xénia**, Erazim, Erazmus, Jaromil, Vlastimila
3. **Karolína**, Kevin, Lino, Linus, Palmíro, Kaja, Klotilda, Lina, Lineta, Palmíra
4. **Lenka**, Lena
5. **Laura**, Dorotej, Fatima, Laurencia, Loreta, Loriána, Lara
6. **Norbert**, Norman, Romulus, Adolfína, Norberta, Perzida
7. **Róbert**, Borislav, Robin, Teodot, Dalma, Oriána, Róberta, Robina
8. **Medard**
9. **Stanislava**, Felicián, Prímus, Vojeslav, Berenika, Vojeslava
10. **Margaréta**, Gréta
11. **Dobroslava**, Barnabáš, Dobrava, Dobrota, Dobrotína, Flóra, Pavoslava
12. **Zlatko**, Svätoslav, Svetislav, Svetoslav, Zlatan, Zlatomír, Zlatoň, Zlatoš, Svätoslava, Svetislava, Svetoslava, Zlatana, Zlatomíra
13. **Anton**, Genadij, Tobiáš,
14. **Vasil**, Bazil, Elizej, Kvintilián, Kvintín, Kvintus, Herta, Kvinta, Kvintiliána
15. **Vít**, Jolana
16. **Bianka**, **Blanka**, Benon, Božetech, Alina, Božetecha
17. **Adolf**, Adolfína
18. **Vratislav**, Leontín, Milovan, Milovín, Sedrik, Leontína, Milovana
19. **Alfréd**, Leonid, Leonídas, Leoš, Ruslan, Alfréda
20. **Valéria**, Florencián, Florentín, Silver, Florencia, Florentína
21. **Alojz**, Elvis, Lejla
22. **Paulína**, Achác, Eberhard, Paulín, Paula, Rozvita, Zaira
23. **Sidónia**, Sidón
24. **Ján**, Janis, Jaško, Jens, Johan, Jovan, Nino, Sean
25. **Tadeáš**, **Olívia**, Olívius, Prosper, Febrónia, Oliva
26. **Adriána**, Stojan, Adriena, Ria, Riana, Stojana
27. **Ladislav**, **Ladislava**,
28. **Beáta**, Beátus, Slavoj, Bea
29. **Pavol**, **Peter**, **Petra**, Pavel, Pavla, Petula
30. **Melánia**, Vlastibor, Vlastimír, Šárka, Vlastimíra

== July ==
1. **Diana**, Dean, Dejan, Dina, Zian, Dajana, Deana, Kalina, Tabita, Tajana
2. **Berta**, Bertín, Bertína
3. **Miloslav**, Irenej, Miliduch, Milomír, Milorad, Radimír, Rodimír, Radimíra
4. **Prokop**, Procius, Prokopa
5. **Cyril**, **Metod**, Cyrus, Cyrila
6. **Patrik**, **Patrícia**, Patrokles
7. **Oliver**, Donald, Kastor, Veleslav, Velislav, Valibals, Veleslava, Velislava
8. **Ivan**, Ivo, Kilián, Perikles
9. **Lujza**, Lukrécius, Lizelota, Lukrécia
10. **Amália**, Amína, Lada
11. **Milota**, Milutín
12. **Nina**, Fortunát, Fortunáta
13. **Margita**, Arne, Borivoj, Merkéta
14. **Kamil**
15. **Henrich**, Egon, Enrik, Enriko, Henrik, Henrika, Lota, Šarlota
16. **Drahomír**, Karmela, Karmen, Karmena, Rút, Rúta
17. **Bohuslav**, Božislav, Svorad
18. **Kamila**
19. **Dušana**
20. **Eliáš**, **Iľja**, Ilia, Eliána, Iliana
21. **Daniel**, Dan, Dalina
22. **Magdaléna**, Magda, Mahuliena, Majda
23. **Oľga**, Apolinár, Libérius, Libor, Liborius, Apolinára, Libora
24. **Vladimír**, Kinga
25. **Jakub**, Žakelína, Jamie
26. **Anna**, **Hana**, Aneta, Anica, Anita, Annamária, Naneta
27. **Božena**, Gorazd, Pantaleon
28. **Krištof**, Innocent, Svätomír, Svätoš, Inocencia, Nausika, Svätomíra
29. **Marta**, Olaf, Serafín, Serafa, Serafína
30. **Libuša**, Abdon, Ingemar, Ingeborga, Ľubuša, Rowena
31. **Ignác**, Ignát, Vatroslav, Ignácia

== August ==
1. **Božidara**, Božidar, Ľudomír, Božica, Kleopatra, Ľudomíra, Penelopa, Gábor
2. **Gustáv**, Gustáva
3. **Jerguš**, Nikodém, Nikodéma
4. **Dominik**, **Dominika**, Krasoslav, Rainer, Krasoslava
5. **Hortenzia**, Hortenz, Milivoj, Osvald, Snežana
6. **Jozefína**, Nehoslav, Jozefa
7. **Štefánia**, Kajetán, Afra, Afrodita, Kajetána, Štefana
8. **Oskár**, Donát, Hartvig, Virgín, Donáta, Virgínia
9. **Ľubomíra**, Rastic
10. **Vavrinec**, Lars
11. **Zuzana**, Trojan, Dulcia, Dulcinela, Dulcínia
12. **Darina**, Dárius, Dária
13. **Ľubomír**, Hypolit, Kasián, Kasius, Belinda
14. **Mojmír**, Eusébius, Mojtech, Eusébia
15. **Marcela**
16. **Leonard**, Jáchim, Joachim, Linhart, Rochus, Leonarda
17. **Milica**, Bertram, Bertrand, Hyacint, Libert, Mirón, Hyacinta
18. **Elena**, **Helena**, Ilona
19. **Lýdia**, Vratislava
20. **Anabela**, Arabela
21. **Jana**, Janka, Johana, Jovana
22. **Tichomír**, Sigfríd, Tichomil, Tichomíra
23. **Filip**, Vlastislav, Filipa, Filipína, Vlastislava
24. **Bartolomej**, Bartolomea
25. **Ľudovít**, Ludvig, Radim, Ľudovíta
26. **Samuel**, Samo, Zemfír, Samuela, Tália, Zemfíra
27. **Silvia**, Silvio, Silvius
28. **Augustín**, August, Augusta, Augustína, Gustína
29. **Nikola**, Nikolaj, Koleta, Nikoleta
30. **Ružena**, Ružica
31. **Nora**, Rajmund, Ramón, Rajmunda, Ramona

== September ==
1. **Drahoslava**, Egid, Egídius
2. **Linda**, Absolón, Axel, Justus, Ermelinda, Melinda, Rebeka, Clayton
3. **Belo**, Antim, Klélia
4. **Rozália**, Kandid, Mojžiš, Rozalín, Rozálio, Kandida, Róza, Rozeta, Rozita, Rusalka
5. **Regína**, Bojan, Bojimír, Bojislav, Borimír, Branimír, Chotimír, Justinián, Otakar, Regan, Regulus, Viktorín, Bojana, Bojimíra, Boislava, Branimíra, Budislava, Chotimíra, Larisa
6. **Alica**, Brian, Magnus, Mansvét, Zachariáš, Bria
7. **Marianna**, Miriam, Mariana
8. **Miriama**, Miriana
9. **Martina**, Gordan, Gordián, Gordon, Gordana, Rea, Tina
10. **Oleg**, Honór, Vitold, Honóra, Krasava, Vitolda
11. **Bystrík**, Prótus, Zdislav, Helga, Zdislava
12. **Mária**, Maja, Manon, Manona, Marica, Mariela, Marieta, Marika, Marila, Mariola, Marlena, Marusia, Lokmane
13. **Ctibor**, Amát, Amátus, Stibor, Sven, Amáta
14. **Ľudomil**, Dragan, Dragutín, Drahan, Drahotín, Ľudomila, Radka, Serena
15. **Jolana**, Melisa, Melita
16. **Ľudmila**, Duňa
17. **Olympia**, Lambert, Záviš
18. **Eugénia**, Ariadna
19. **Konštantín**, Trofín, Konstancia, Konštantína
20. **Ľuboslav**, **Ľuboslava**, Eustach, Filibert, Liboslav, Eustachia, Liboslava
21. **Matúš**, Ifigénia, Mirela
22. **Móric**, Maurícius, Maurus
23. **Zdenka**, Polyxénia, Tekla, Zdena
24. **Ľubor**, Ľuboš, Terenc
25. **Vladislav**, Vladivoj, Eufrozina, Fruzína, Vladislava
26. **Edita**, Edina
27. **Cyprián**, Damián, Kozmas, Damiána, Mirabela
28. **Václav**, Chariton, Kariton, Václava
29. **Michal**, **Michaela**, Michael, Michala
30. **Jarolím**, Hieronym, Jeremiáš, Jarolíma, Ráchel, Ráchela, Una

== October ==
1. **Arnold**, Remig, Remus, Arnolda, Belina
2. **Levoslav**, Leodegar, Levoslava, Dugo
3. **Stela**, Amadeus, Evald, Amadea
4. **František**, Edvin, Fraňo
5. **Viera**, Blahomír, Placid, Blahomíra, Karitína, Placida, Winfred
6. **Natália**
7. **Eliška**
8. **Brigita**, Brit, Brita
9. **Dionýz**, Dionýzia
10. **Slavomíra**, Gedeon, Záboj, Krasomila
11. **Valentína**, Belín, Zvonimír, Zvonislav, Bruna, Brunhilda, Luneta, Selena, Zvonimíra, Zvonislava
12. **Maximilián**, Max, Maximiliána
13. **Koloman**, Edgar
14. **Boris**, Borislav, Kalist, Borislava, Kalista
15. **Terézia**, Tereza
16. **Vladimíra**, Gál, Havel, Havla
17. **Hedviga**, Jadviga
18. **Lukáš**
19. **Kristián**, Christián, Izák, Christiána, Kristiána
20. **Vendelín**, Eunika, Vendelína
21. **Uršuľa**, Anatol, Anatólia, Antília
22. **Sergej**, Dobromil, Sergius, Zdravomil, Kordula, Korduľa, Pribislava, Saloma, Saloména, Solomia
23. **Alojzia**, Žitomír
24. **Kvetoslava**, Aretas, Cvetan, Gilbert, Harold, Herald, Krasomil, Kvetoň, Kvetoslav, Rafael, Šalamún, Areta, Cvetana, Gilberta, Kveta, Kvetana, Kvetava, Rafaela
25. **Aurel**, Krišpín, Vojmír, Zosim, Živan, Živko, Dália, Vojmíra, Živa, Živana
26. **Demeter**, Amand, Dimitrij, Evarist, Amanda, Demetria
27. **Sabína**, Horislav, Hromislav, Horislava, Hromislava, Sabrina, Zoa, Zoana
28. **Dobromila**, Júda, Judáš
29. **Klára**, Narcis, Zenob, Klarisa, Narcisa, Zenóbia
30. **Šimon**, **Simona**, Arzen, Asen, Simon, Asena, Simoneta, Šimona
31. **Aurélia**, Stacho, Volfgang

== November ==
1. **Denis**, **Denisa**
2. Cézar, Cezária
3. **Hubert**
4. **Karol**, Džesika, Jesika, Jessica, Karola, Skarleta
5. **Imrich**, Emerich, Imriška
6. **Renáta**, Renát, Renáto, Renátus
7. **René**, Engelbert
8. **Bohumír**, Bohumíra
9. **Teodor**, Orest, Teo, Teodorik, Teodoz, Deodata, Tea, Teodora, Teodózia
10. **Tibor**, Tiber, Meluzína, Tibora
11. **Martin**, Martinián, Marrow, **Maroš**
12. **Svätopluk**, Astrid, Jonáš, Astrida
13. **Stanislav**
14. **Irma**, Juventín, Mladen, Mladoň, Mladotín, Ima, Juventína, Mladena, Mladotína
15. **Leopold**, Leopolda, Leopoldína
16. **Agnesa**, Otmar, Agneša, Inéza
17. **Klaudia**, Klodeta
18. **Eugen**, Platón
19. **Alžbeta**, Betina, Elizabeta, Lila, Liliana, Líza
20. **Félix**, Filemon, Homér
21. **Elvíra**, Ctirad, Ctirada
22. **Cecília**, Cecilián, Šejla
23. **Klement**, Klementín, Kliment, Kolumbín, Klementína, Kolumbína
24. **Emília**, Milín, Milina
25. **Katarína**, Katrina
26. **Kornel**, Valerián, Brandon
27. **Milan**, Nestor, Virgil, Milana
28. **Henrieta**, Gerhard, Tristan, Desdemona, Eta
29. **Vratko**, Saturnín, Zaida
30. **Ondrej**, **Andrej**, Andreas

== December ==
1. **Edmund**, Edmunda, Elza
2. **Bibiána**, Budimír, Budislav, Budimíra, Viviána
3. **Oldrich**, Sofron, Xavér, Sofrónia, Xavéria
4. **Barbora**, Babeta, Barbara, Barica
5. **Oto**, Gerald, Otakar, Otokar, Geralda, Geraldína, Jitka, Ota, Sáva
6. **Mikuláš**, Nikita, Niko, Nikolas, Nikoleta, Mikuláška
7. **Ambróz**, Amarant, Amaranta, Ambrózia
8. **Marina**
9. **Izabela**, Dalila, Leokádia
10. **Radúz**, Herbert
11. **Hilda**, Hildegard, Hildegarda
12. **Otília**, Spiridon, Dília, Odeta
13. **Lucia**, Rosan, Rosana, Roxana
14. **Branislava**, **Bronislava**, Broňa
15. **Ivica**, Detrich, Radan, Radana
16. **Albína**, Bela, Teofánia
17. **Kornélia**, Lazár, Kora, Korina
18. **Sláva**, Gracián, Grácia, Graciána, Slavislava
19. **Judita**, Abrahám, Mstislav, Neméz, Ita, Mstislava, Neméza
20. **Dagmara**, Dag, Dagobert, Daga, Damara
21. **Bohdan**
22. **Adela**, Ada, Adelaida, Adelgunda, Adelína, Adina, Alida
23. **Nadežda**, Naďa
24. **Adam**, **Eva**, Evamária, Evelína, Gaja, Gajana, Geja
25. **Štefan**
26. **Filoména**, Filomén
27. **Ivana**, **Ivona**, Iva
28. **Milada**, Jonatán, Miladín, Nátan, Natanel
29. **Dávid**, Lotar
30. **Silvester**, Horst

== See also ==
- Name day
