= Teofila =

Teofila (and its variant Teófila) is a feminine given name of Spanish origin. Notable people with the name are as follows:

- Teofila Băiașu (born 1927), Romanian gymnast
- Teofila Bogumiła Glińska (died 1799), Polish poet
- Teofila Chmielecka (1590–1650), wife of Polish noble Stefan Chmielecki
- Teofila Działyńska (Szołdrska-Potulicka) (1714–1790), Polish landowner
- Teofila Fedorovna Romanovich (1842–1924), Ukrainian stage actress and theatre director
- Teófila Márquiz (born 1932), Venezuelan fencer
- Teófila Martínez (born 1948), Spanish politician
- Teofila Radziwiłł (fl. 1781), Polish noblewoman and Freemason
- Teofila Zofia Sobieska (1607–1661), Polish noblewoman
- Teofila Ludwika Zasławska (c. 1650–1709), Polish noblewoman
