= Hebe (mythology) =

Ancient Greek goddess of youth

- Goddess of youth
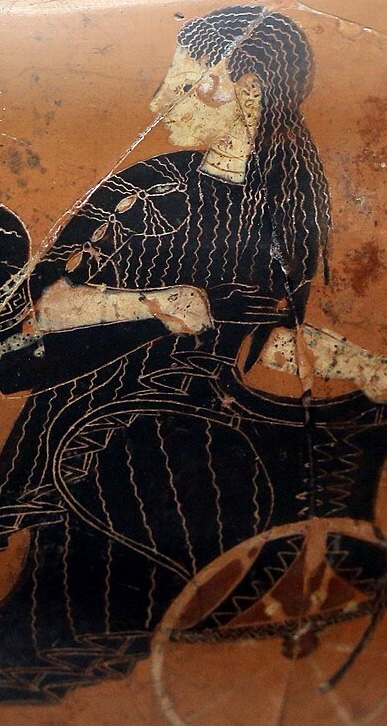
- Classical depiction of Hebe
- Abode: Mount Olympus
- Symbol: Wine-cup, Eagle, Ivy, Fountain of Youth, Hens, and Wings

Genealogy
- Parents: Zeus and Hera
- Siblings: Ares, Hephaestus, Eileithyia
- Consort: Heracles
- Children: Alexiares and Anicetus

In ancient Greek religion and mythology, Hebe (/ˈhiːbiː/; Ancient Greek: Ἥβη, lit. 'youth') is the goddess of youth or of the prime of life. She was the cup-bearer for the gods of Mount Olympus, serving their nectar and ambrosia. On Sicyon, she was worshipped as a goddess of forgiveness or mercy. She was often given the epithet Ganymeda ('Gladdening Princess').

Hebe is a daughter of Zeus and Hera, and the divine wife of Heracles (Roman equivalent: Hercules). She has influence over eternal youth and the ability to restore youth to mortals, a power that appears exclusive to her, as in Ovid's Metamorphoses, some gods lament the aging of their favoured mortals. According to Philostratus the Elder, Hebe is the youngest of the gods and the one responsible for keeping them eternally young, and thus is the most revered by them. Her role of ensuring the eternal youth of the other gods is appropriate to her role of serving as cup-bearer, as the word ambrosia has been linked to a possible Proto-Indo-European translation related to immortality, undying, and lifeforce. In art, she is typically depicted with her father in the guise of an eagle, often offering a cup to him. Her equivalent Roman goddess is Juventas.

== Name and etymology ==
The theonym Hebe (Ἥβη) derives from the Greek noun hḗbē (ἥβη), meaning 'youth, prime, vigour of youth, sexual maturity'.

The etymology is debated. A common view derives it from a Proto-Indo-European form *(H)iēgʷ-eh₂- ('youth, [youthful] vigour'), on account of possible cognates such as Lithuanian jėga ('power, strength') and Latvian jêga ('power, sense'). However, this derivation has been questioned by some linguists such as Rick Derksen, since some Greek forms begin with an initial ἁ-.

Although she was not as strongly associated with her father, Hebe was occasionally referred to with the epithet Dia (see Cult), which can be translated to 'Daughter of Zeus' or 'Heavenly'.

== Mythology ==
=== Birth ===
Hebe is the daughter of Zeus and his sister-wife Hera. Pindar in Nemean Ode 10 refers to her as the most beautiful of the goddesses, and being by her mother's side in Olympus forever.

Reconstructed Orphic beliefs may present a different version of Hera's impregnation with Hebe. It should be remembered that this version of the myth of Hebe's birth is a speculative reconstruction, and therefore, it likely does not represent how the myth would have been known to its original audience. In another version, Hera sought out a way to become pregnant without assistance of Zeus by travelling to realm of Oceanus and Tethys at the end of the world. There, she entered the garden of Flora and she touched a sole, nameless plant from the land of Olene and became pregnant with Ares. Hera returned to the garden sometime after his birth and ate lettuce to become pregnant with Hebe.

The consumption of lettuce in Ancient Greece was connected to sexual impotency in men and women, with Plutarch recording that women should never eat the heart of a lettuce. Additionally, lettuce was associated with death, as Aphrodite laid the dying Adonis in a patch to potentially aid in his reconstruction. Despite these concerns, it was also believed that lettuce benefited menstrual flow and lactation in women, characteristics that may associate the plant with motherhood. This version of Hebe's paternity is referenced by American author Henry David Thoreau in his work Walden, where Hebe is described as the daughter of Juno and wild lettuce.

A fragment by Callimachus describes Hera holding a feast to celebrate the seventh day after her daughter Hebe's birth. The gods have a friendly argument over who will give the best gift, with Poseidon, Athena, Apollo, and Hephaestus specifically mentioned as presenting toys or, as in Apollo's case, songs. Callimachus, who composed a poem for the celebration of the seventh day after the birth of a daughter to his friend Leon, used Apollo's gift of a song as a divine prototype for his own gift. In some traditions that were recorded by Servius, her father Zeus gifted her two doves with human voices, and one flew to where the Oracle of Dodona would be established.

Hebe was initially seen in myth as a diligent daughter performing domestic tasks that were typical of high ranking, unmarried girls in ancient Greece. In the Iliad, she did tasks around the household such as drawing baths for her brother Ares and helping Hera enter her chariot. Additionally, Hebe was often connected to Aphrodite, whom she was described dancing with and acting as her herald or attendant, linking the Classical association between beauty and "the bloom of youth".

=== Marriage ===
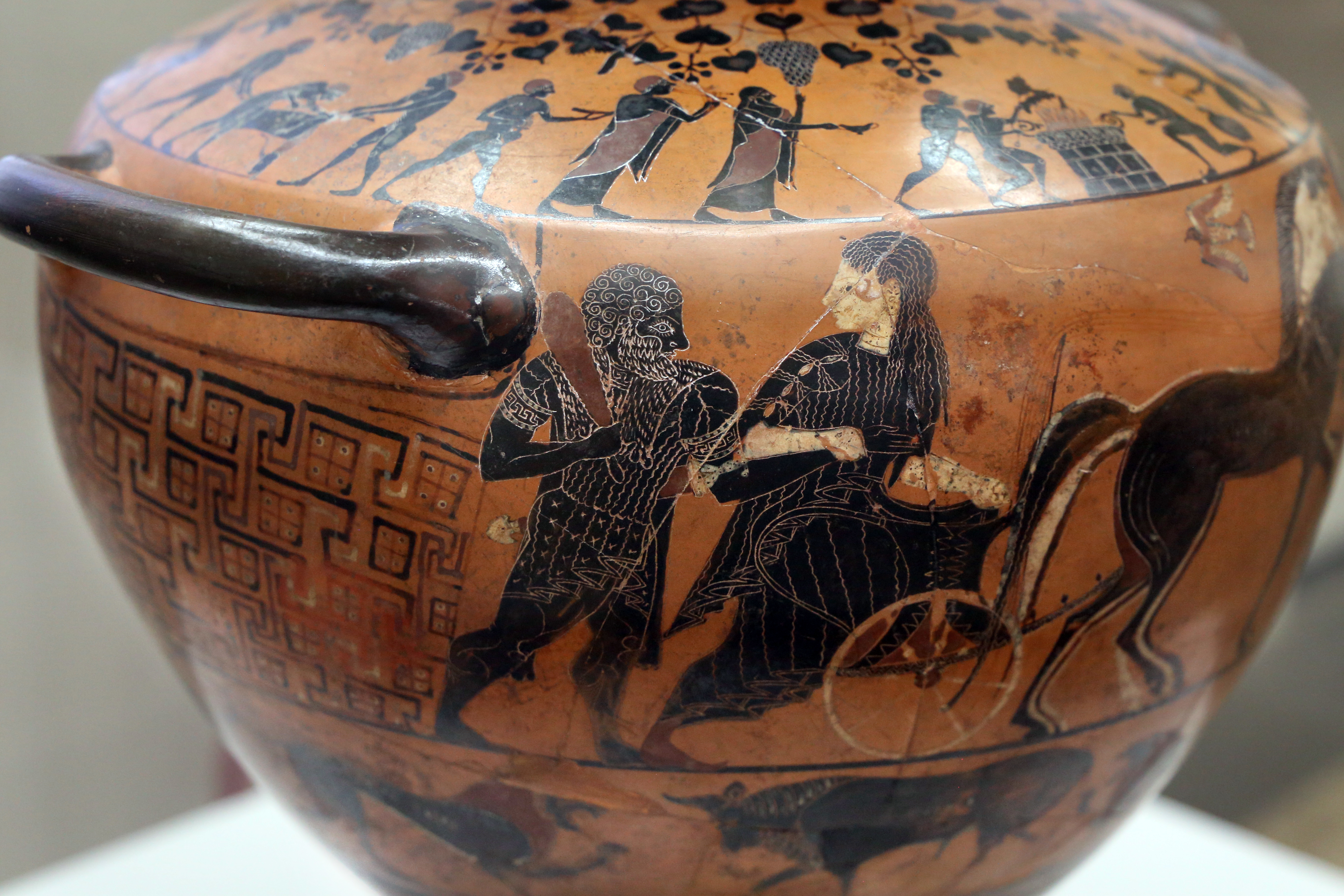
The Ricci Hydria showing Hebe bringing Heracles to Olympus from Earth upon his apotheosis. (National Etruscan Museum)

As the bride of Heracles, Hebe was strongly associated with both brides and her husband in art and literature. She was the patron of brides, due to being the daughter of the goddess of marriage Hera and the importance of her own wedding. Hebe's role as the patron of brides is referenced in Edmund Spenser's Epithalamion, where the poem also connects her to the fertility of the bride. In some depictions on vase paintings, such as the Ricci Hydria dated to approximately 525 B.C.E., Hebe drives a chariot and is the one to bring her future husband, Heracles, to Olympus from Earth upon his apotheosis, a role traditionally fulfilled by Athena. A krater in the Cleveland Museum may depict Hebe in chariot ready to leave Olympus to retrieve her husband in the presence of her mother, Artemis, and Apollo.

The lost comedic play, Hebes Gamos ("The Marriage of Hebe") by Epicharmus of Kos, depicted the wedding feast of Hebe and Heracles. In Theocritus's Encomium of Ptolemy Philadelphus, Heracles dines with Ptolemy I and Alexander at a feast on Olympus and after he has his fill of nectar, he bestows his bow and arrows and club to them and leaves for his wife's chamber. Here the couple is presented as one of the paradigms for marriage of Philadelphus and Arsinoe with Heracles retiring to Hebe's chambers in a scene reminiscent of a wedding. Catullus in Poem 68 makes a positive reference to the legal marriage of Heracles to the virginal goddess Hebe to contrast with the poet's secret affair with a married woman. Propertius also makes a reference to Heracles feeling a blazing love for Hebe upon his death at Mount Oeta, altering the traditional myth where Heracles marries Hebe after ascending to divinity.

Hebe had two children with Heracles: Alexiares and Anicetus. Although nothing is known about these deities beyond their names, there is a fragment by Callimachus that makes a reference to Eileithyia, Hebe's sister and the goddess of childbirth, attending to Hebe while in labour.

=== Giver of youth ===
One of Hebe's roles was to be the cupbearer to the gods, serving them ambrosia and nectar. In Classical sources, her departure from this role was due to her marriage. Alternatively, the Iliad presented Hebe (and at one instance, Hephaestus) as the cup bearer of the gods with the divine hero Ganymede acting as Zeus's personal cup bearer. Additionally, Cicero seems to imply that either Hebe or Ganymede, who is typically seen as her successor, could serve in the role of cupbearer at the heavenly feast. The reasoning for Hebe's supposed dismissal was transformed into a moralizing story in the 1500s by the Church of England, where it was stated in a note in an English-Latin dictionary that she fell while in attendance to the gods, causing her dress to become undone, exposing her naked body publicly. Although there is no Classical literary or artistic source for this account, the story was modified to function as a warning to women to stay modestly covered at all times, as naked women in particular were seen as shameful by the Church. During this period, she was strongly associated with spring, so this addition of her falling to the myth was also allegorized to represent the change of season from spring to autumn.

According to some Classical authors, Hebe was connected to maintaining the youth and immortality of the other gods. Philostratus the Elder states that she is the reason the other gods are eternally young, and Bacchylides alleges that Hebe, as the princess (basileia), is responsible for immortality. This is another justification for her marriage to Heracles, as it ensures not only his immortality but also eternal youth, which were not viewed as equivalent in myths, such as with the case of Tithonus. In Euripides' play Heracleidae and in Ovid's Metamorphoses, Hebe grants Iolaus' wish to become young again in order to fight Eurystheus. In Euripides' play Orestes, Helen is said to sit on a throne beside Hera and Hebe upon obtaining immortality.

== Cult ==
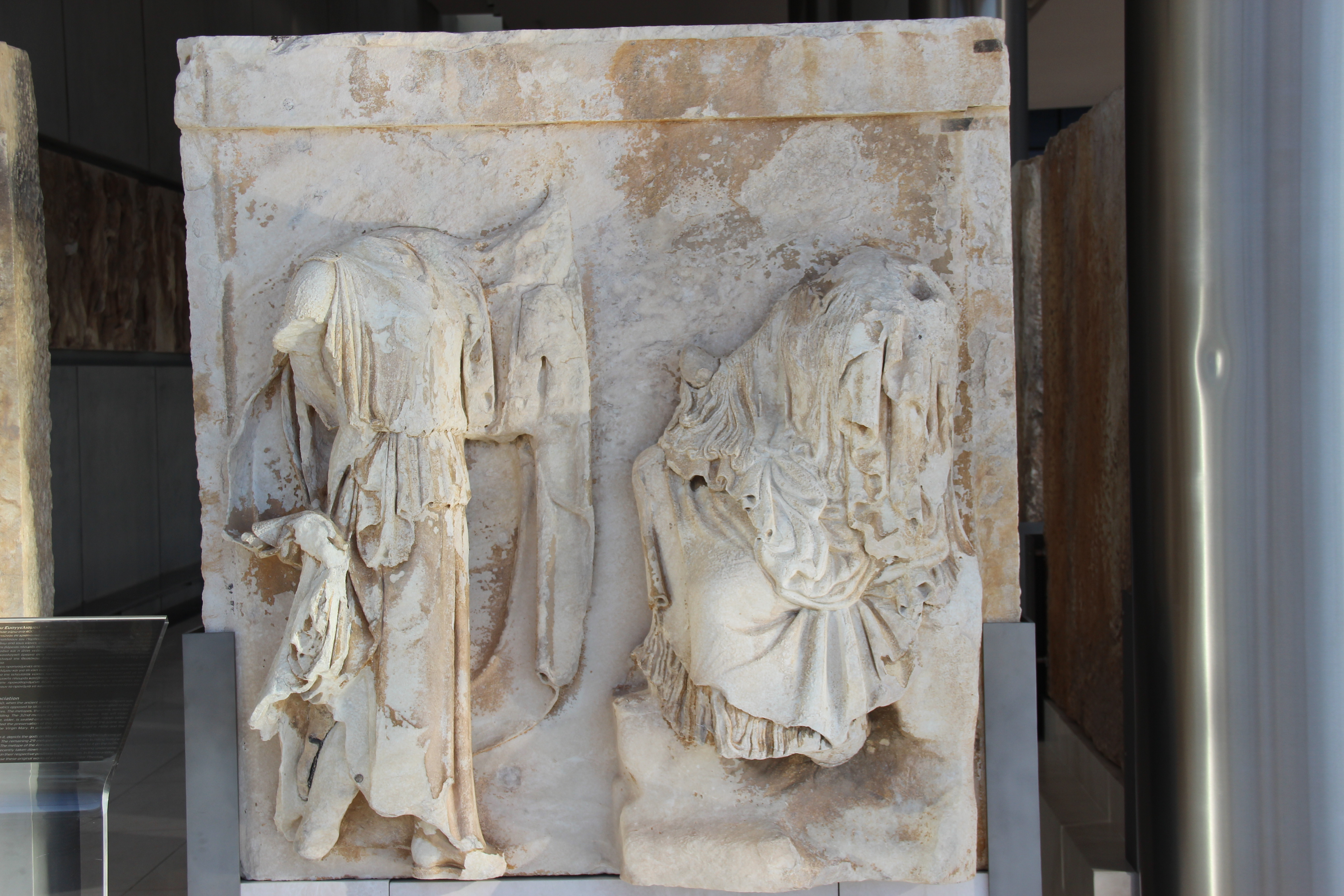
Hebe with her mother Hera on a metope from the Parthenon, Acropolis Museum, Greece.

Hebe was particularly associated with the worship of her mother Hera in Argos and in the Heraion of Argos, one of the main centres of worship of Hera in Greece. It was said that Hebe, in a statue made of ivory and gold, was depicted standing beside a very large statue of Hera, which depicted the goddess seated holding a pomegranate and sceptre with a cuckoo perched on top. A relief made of silver above an altar depicted the marriage of Hebe and Heracles. Both of these depictions have been lost, but Argive coins have been found showing these two statues side by side. It is possible that Hebe was worshipped as or represented as the virginal aspect of Hera, or that her worship with her mother was similar to that of Demeter and Persephone, as both potentially represented the cycle of rebirth and renewal. Some scholars theorize that one of the Temples of Hera at Paestum may have been dedicated to Hera and Hebe rather than to Hera and Zeus, which is the more common consensus. Scholars point to the headless bust of a well-dressed young girl that may have served as the antefix or acroterion of the temple as possibly being a representation of Hebe. Hebe was also depicted, alongside Athena, standing beside a sitting statue of Hera in the Temple of Hera at Mantinea in Arkadia, sculptured by Praxiteles.

Hebe also appears to be worshipped jointly with other figures as well. There is a record of a priestess from the deme of Aexone who served both Hebe and Alkmene being rewarded with a crown of olive leaves for her service. Aelian also refer to Hebe being worshipped in a temple that was adjacent to a temple dedicated to her spouse Herakles in an unknown location. The temples, which were separated by a canal, housed roosters in Heracles's temple and hens in Hebe's temple. Chickens were not commonly associated with either deity and more typically associated with Apollo. Some scholars have indicated that in Assyria, Apollo was particularly associated with Hebe.

Hebe also had her own personal cult and at least one temple in Greece dedicated to her. There was an altar for her in Athens at the Cynosarges. This site also contained gymnasium and altars for Herakles and joint altar to Alcmene and Iolaus In Sicyon, there was a temple dedicated to here and it was the center of her own cult. The Phliasians, who lived near Sicyon, honored Hebe (whom they called Dia, meaning "Daughter of Zeus") by pardoning supplicants. Hebe was also worshipped as a goddess of pardons or forgiveness; freed prisoners would hang their chains in the sacred grove of her sanctuary at Phlius. Pausanias described the Temple of Hebe: "A second hill on which the Phliasians [of Phlios in Argolis] have their citadel and their sanctuary of Hebe." He also described the cult of Hebe around the sanctuary:

"On the Phliasian citadel [at Phlios in Argolis] is a grove of cypress trees and a sanctuary which from ancient times has been held to be peculiarly holy. The earliest Phliasians named the goddess to whom the sanctuary belongs Ganymeda; but later authorities call her Hebe, whom Homer mentions in the duel between Menelaos (Menelaus) and Alexandros (Alexander), saying that she was the cup-bearer of the gods; and again he says, in the descent of Odysseus to Haides, that she was the wife of Heracles. Olen [a legendary Greek poet], in his hymn to Hera, says that Hera was reared by the Horai (Horae, Seasons), and that her children were Ares and Hebe. Of the honours that the Phliasians pay to this goddess the greatest is the pardoning of suppliants. All those who seek sanctuary here receive full forgiveness, and prisoners, when set free, dedicate their fetters on the trees in the grove. The Phliasians also celebrate a yearly festival which they call Kissotomoi (Ivy-cutters). There is no image, either kept in secret of openly displayed, and the reason for this is set forth in a sacred legend of theirs though on the left as you go out is a temple of Hera with an image of Parian marble."

== Ancient art ==
In art, Hebe is usually depicted wearing a sleeveless dress, typically she was depicted with either one or both her parents, at her wedding ceremony, or with Aphrodite.

Hebe was occasionally depicted with wings, which has led to confusion by modern scholars on whether depictions of winged female attendants are Hebe, Iris, or Nike. One confirmed depiction of Hebe with wings, as determined by the Η above the figure's head, is on a cup by Sosias. Hebe is presumably between enthroned parents as she waits for her future husband Heracles, who directed towards her by Athena, Apollo, and Hermes. Another notable depiction of a winged Hebe is by the Castelgiorgio painter on a cup, who pairs her with her mother and Ganymede analogously with Zeus; Ares stands in the center of the scene indicating familial harmony.

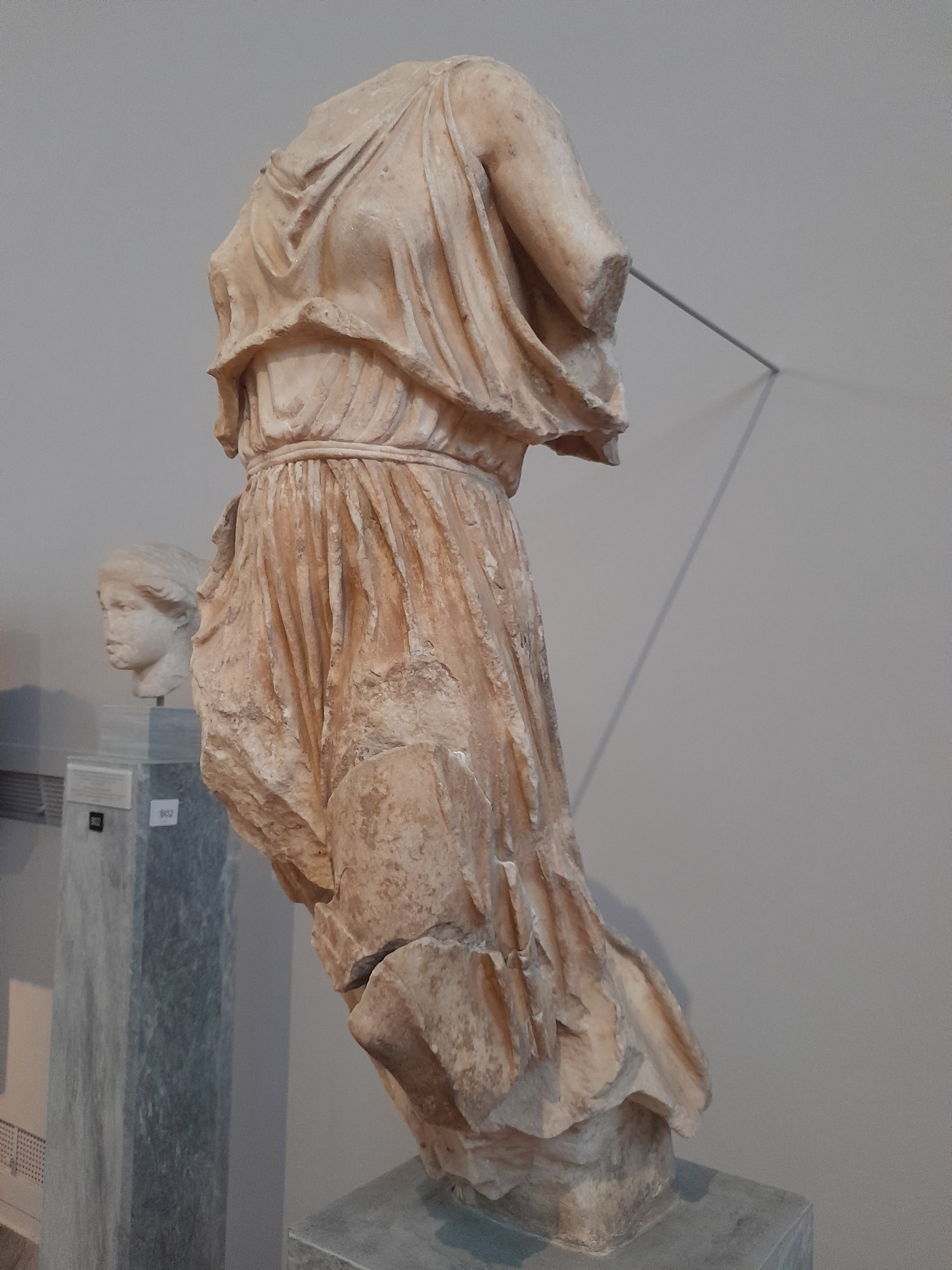
A figure, possibly Hebe, finial from the temple of Ares, ca. 440s BC. National Archaeological Museum of Athens, Greece.

It is possible that she is one of the winged figures from the Parthenon pediment in the British Museum, as the figure stands as an attendant to Hera and is near Zeus and Ares. The figure could also represent Iris or Nike, but contextual evidence arguably makes the identification as Hebe more likely. The depiction of Eros with his mother Aphrodite on the same frieze have been equated to Hebe's position to Hera, as the group seems to pay attention to the young maidens approaching from the right side of the eastern frieze. The two pairs were connected with love and weddings/marriage respectively, which would allude to the young maidens who would soon be married. Another possible connection between the pairs is that Hebe and Eros are portrayed as children who are still dependent on their mothers and stay close to them as a result. The identification of the figure as Hebe would also make sense due to the proximity to Zeus and Ares, her father and brother. Ares and Hebe here are represented as the product of a legal marriage, reinforcing the sacred marriage between Zeus and Hera, which gives an example of a prolific marriage to the mortal pair shown in the centre of the eastern frieze.

Hebe may have been the Acroterion on the Temple of Ares in the Athenian Agora. Hebe may have also been depicted on a fragmentary votive relief that was excavated near the Erechtheion, which shows Heracles being crowned by Nike, who places her left arm around another goddess's shoulders. However, Hebe was not connected with Nike, leading most scholars to believe this goddess is Athena.

As the goddess of the brides, Hebe was often portrayed in wedding scenes. A notable depiction of Hebe comes from an Archaic Attic Black Figure dions dated to 580 – 570 B.C.E., which is attributed to Sophilos and held in the British Museum, depicts Hebe as part of a procession of gods arriving at the house of Peleus to celebrate his wedding to Thetis. Here Hebe is the most prominent goddess in the procession, appearing alone and without a cloak covering her shoulders like most of the other goddess in attendance. She wears an elaborate dress with the patterns of animals and geometric shapes and wears earrings. Her hair is shown to be bound with three braids worn over her shoulder. Her prominent position may be due to her association with feasts, being the patron of brides, or because a mortal man is marrying a goddess, referencing her own marriage to Heracles. Hebe is also a prominent figure on a 5th-century epinetron by the Eretria Painter depicting preparations for the wedding of Harmonia. The bride sits in the centre of the scene on a stool and is surrounded by her friends who prepare her for her wedding as her mother, Aphrodite, oversees the process. The depiction reinforces Hebe's connection to weddings and brides.

== In post-classical art ==
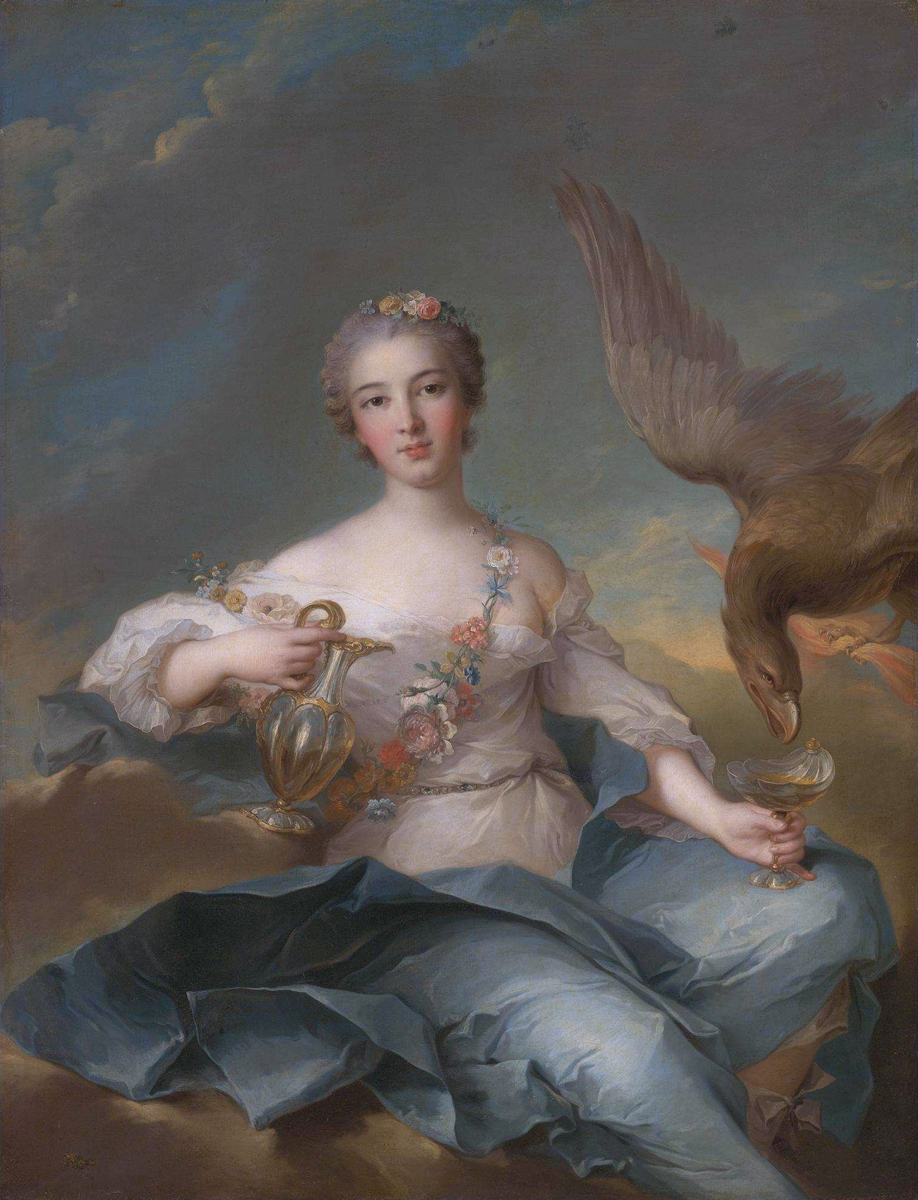
Louise Henriette de Bourbon as Hebe by Jean-Marc Nattier (1744)

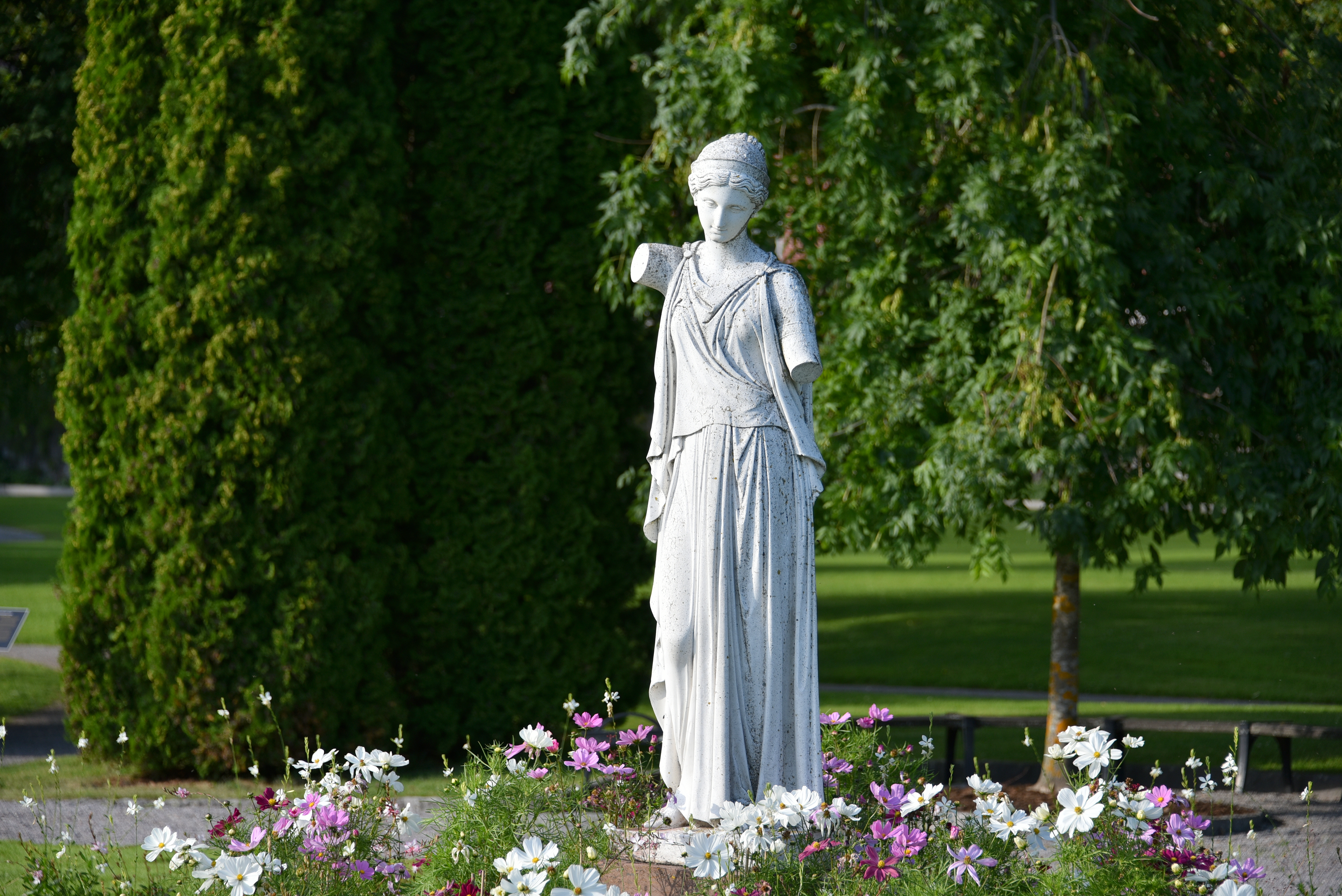
Statue of the goddess Hebe, early 19th century CE, by Johan Niclas Bystrom, Gripsholm Castle, Sweden

Hebe was a remarkably popular subject in art in the period from about 1750 to 1880, having attracted little artistic attention before or after. In the later period, many depictions were portraits of ladies as Hebe, for which at a minimum the only modifications to a normal costume needed were a flowing white dress, some flowers in the hair and a cup to hold. Most artists added an eagle and a setting amid the clouds. In French there was a special term, "en Hébé", for the costume. The personification appears in rococo, Grand Manner and Neoclassical styles. Even some very aristocratic models allowed a degree of nudity, such as exposing a single breast, though this was often much greater in non-portrait depictions.

Jean-Marc Nattier painted a Rohan princess as Hebe in 1737, and then the royal Louise Henriette of Bourbon, Duchess of Orléans (1744) and another duchess the same year as Hebe, the latter with a breast exposed. François-Hubert Drouais painted Marie-Antoinette, when Dauphine, en Hébé in 1773, and Angelica Kauffman and Gaspare Landi both painted several Hebes. Notably, the Mercure de France addressed Marie-Antoinette as Hebe upon her marriage. Louise Élisabeth Vigée Le Brun tells in her memoirs how she painted the 16-year-old Miss Anna Pitt, daughter of Thomas Pitt, Lord Camelford, as Hebe in Rome, with a real eagle she borrowed from Cardinal de Bernis. The bird was furious at being brought indoors to her studio and badly frightened her, though it looks relatively harmless in the painting (now in the Hermitage Museum). An entirely nude depiction by Ignaz Unterberger was a huge success in Vienna in 1795, and bought by Emperor Francis II for a large amount; the artist was also made a court painter.

In sculpture Hebe began to flourish as a subject slightly later, but continued longer. Hubert Gerhard created an early statue of Hebe in 1590 that is currently on display at the Detroit Institute of Arts, which depicts her naked, holding her dress in one hand and a cup raised above her head in another. She rests one foot upon a tortoise, a gesture associated with Aphrodite Urania. Antonio Canova sculpted four different versions of his statue of Hebe, and there are many later copies. This had no accompanying eagle, but including the bird was a challenge accepted by several later sculptors. An elaborate marble group with a naked Hebe and the eagle with wings outspread was started in 1852 by the elderly François Rude but unfinished by his death in 1855. Finished by his widow and another it is now in the Musée des Beaux-Arts de Dijon and was very popular in bronze versions, with one in Chicago. Albert-Ernest Carrier-Belleuse produced another spectacular group, with the eagle perched above a sleeping Hebe (1869, now Musée d'Orsay, Paris). Jean Coulon (1853–1923) produced another group about 1886, with versions in the Musée des Beaux-Arts de Nice, Nice and the Stanford Museum in California.

Especially in America, figures of Hebe continued to be popular in the late 19th century and early 20th century for garden fountains and temperance fountains, and statues were widely available in cast stone. Tarentum, Pennsylvania, United States displays two such cast stone statues of Hebe. The mold for these statues was donated to the borough by the Tarentum Book Club on 6 June 1912. In Vicksburg, Mississippi, the Bloom Fountain installed in 1927 near the municipal rose garden, thanks to a bequest of $6,500 in the will of Louis Bloom, features a Hebe of cast zinc. At Bowling Green, Kentucky, the Hebe fountain in Fountain Square follows Canova's model, in patinated cast iron, purchased in 1881 from the J. L. Mott Iron Works of New York, at a cost of $1500. Similar Hebe fountains, probably also from Mott, are located in Court Square, Memphis, Tennessee and in Montgomery, Alabama, and one with bronze patination was formerly the Starkweather Fountain in Ypsilanti, Michigan, installed in 1889.

There is a bronze statue of Hebe, by Robert Thomas; (1966), in Birmingham city centre, England.

== Gallery ==
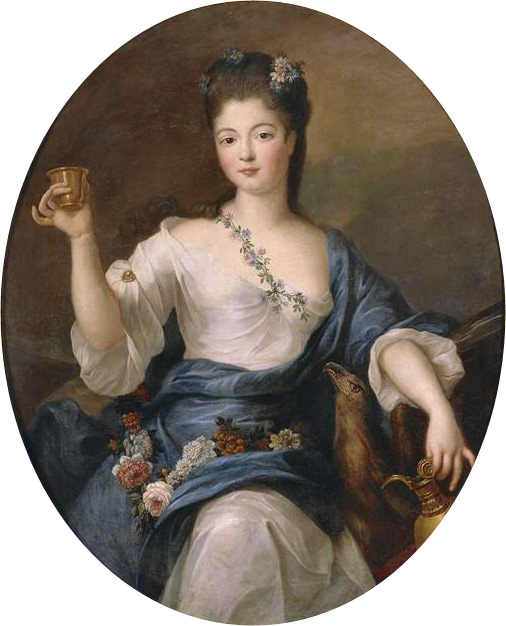
Pierre Gobert, before 1744, Charlotte Aglaé d'Orléans, daughter of the Regent of France

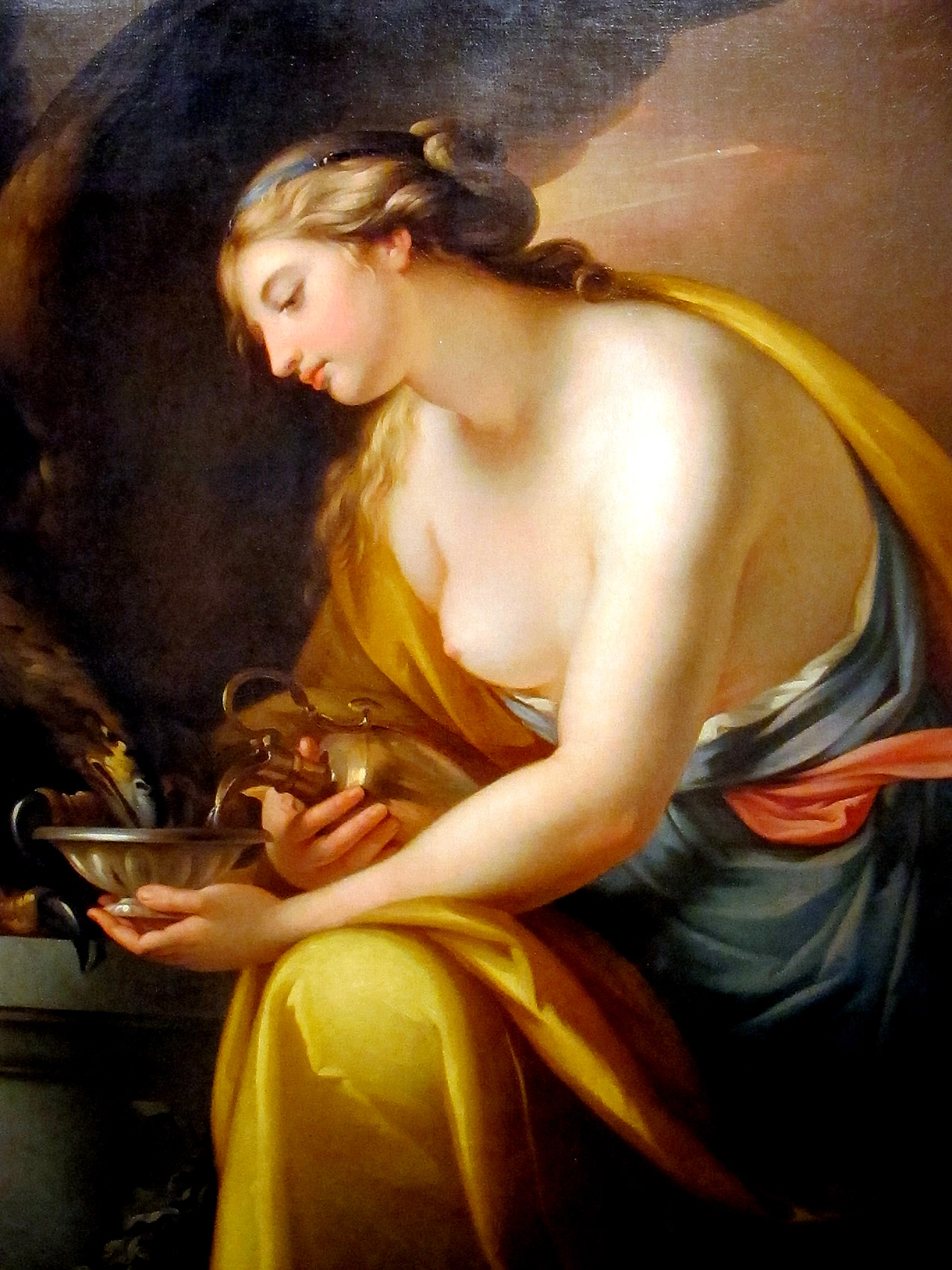
Gavin Hamilton, 1767

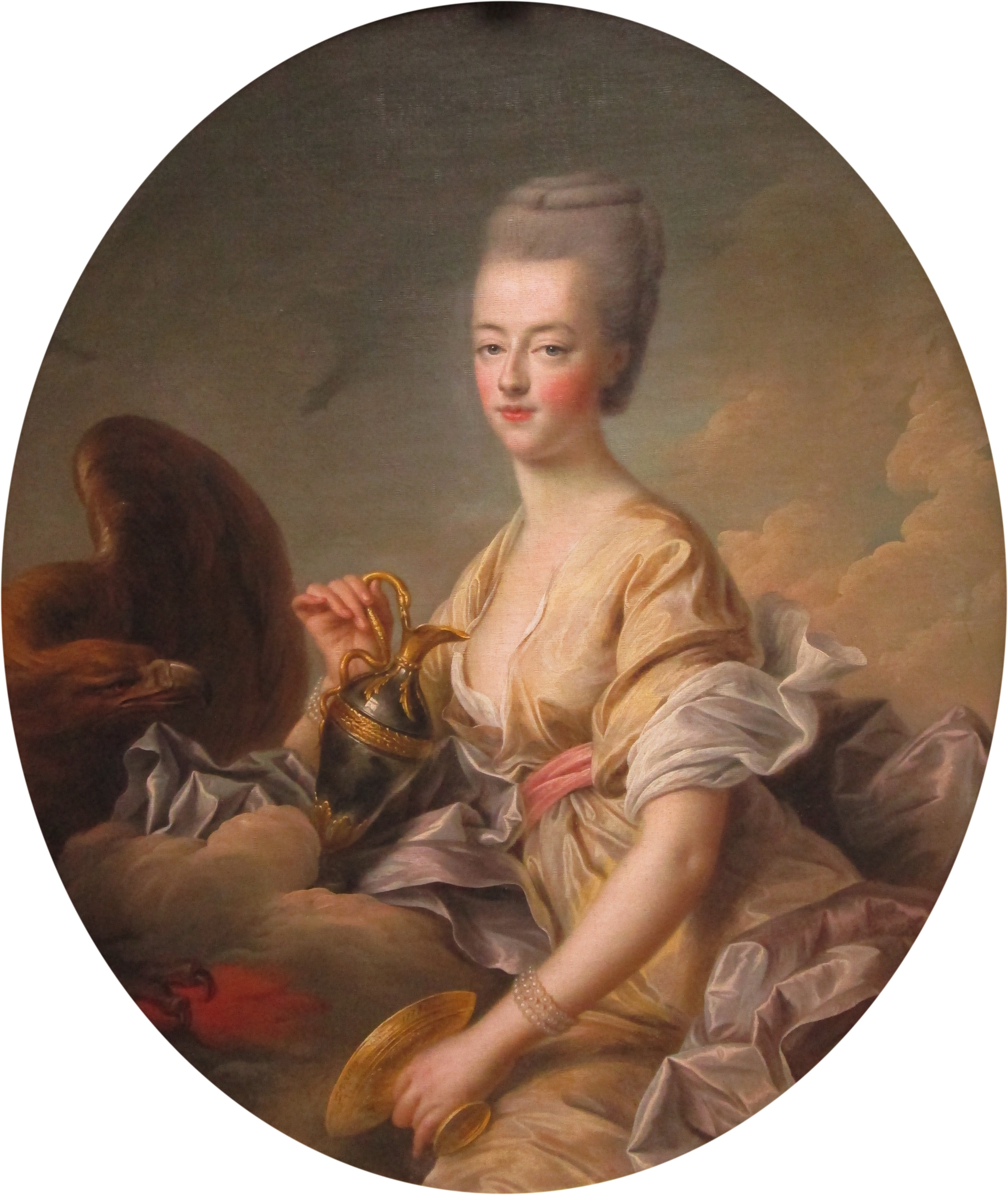
François-Hubert Drouais, Marie-Antoinette, en Hébé, 1773

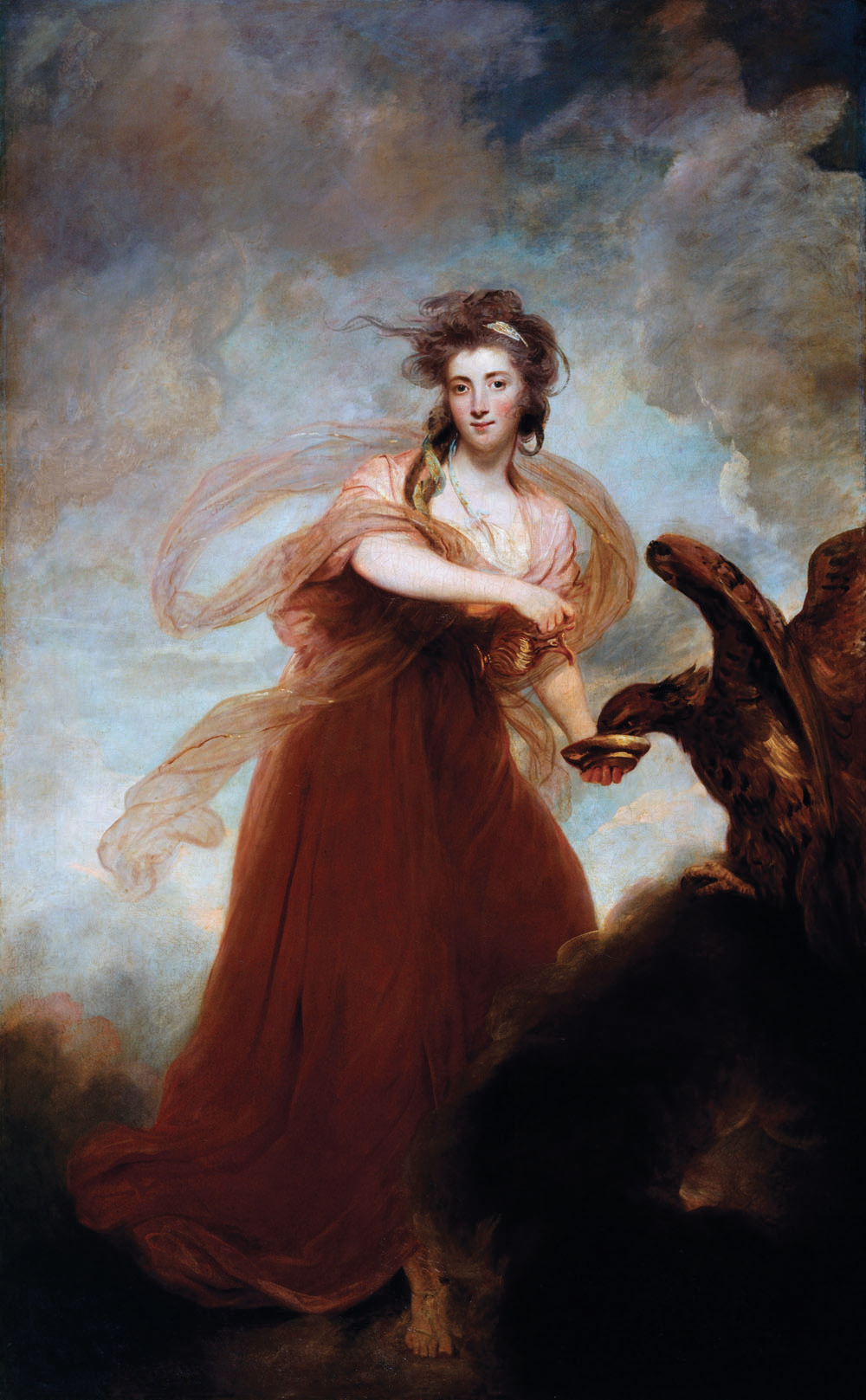
Joshua Reynolds, 1785, Mrs. Musters as Hebe

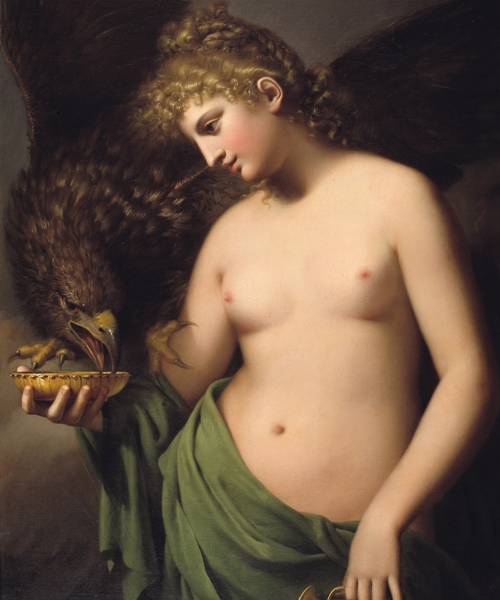
Gaspare Landi 1790, using a model

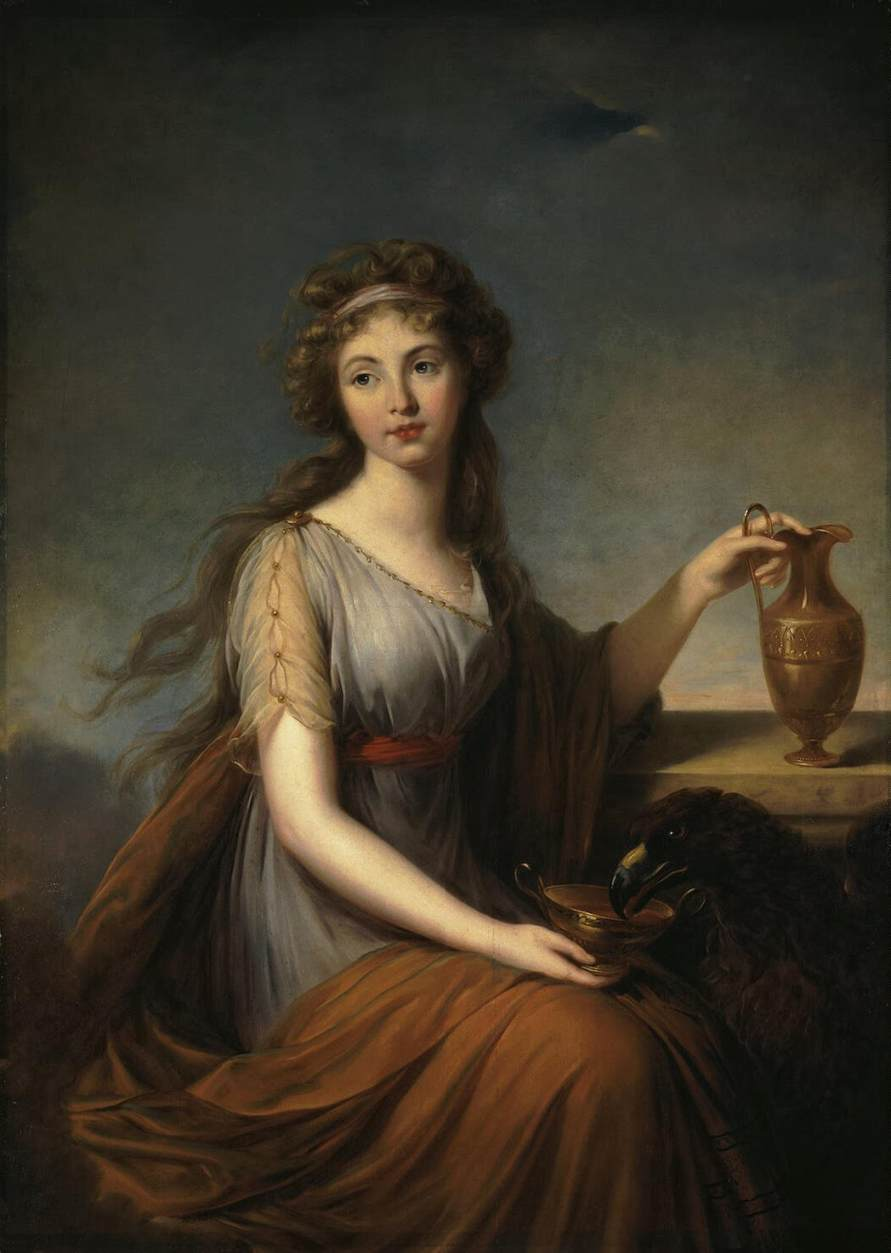
Elisabeth Vigée-Lebrun, Anne Pitt as Hebe, 1792

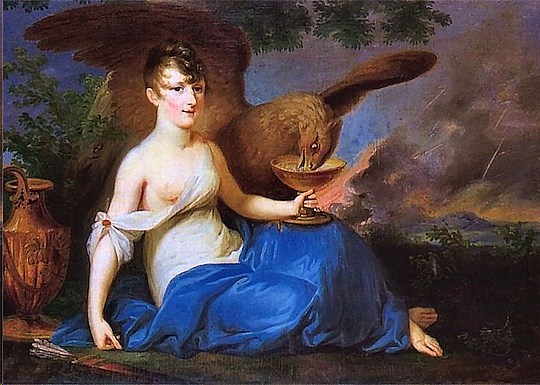
Princess Teofila Radziwiłł, wife of Dominik Hieronim Radziwiłł, by Józef Peszka, 1802–06

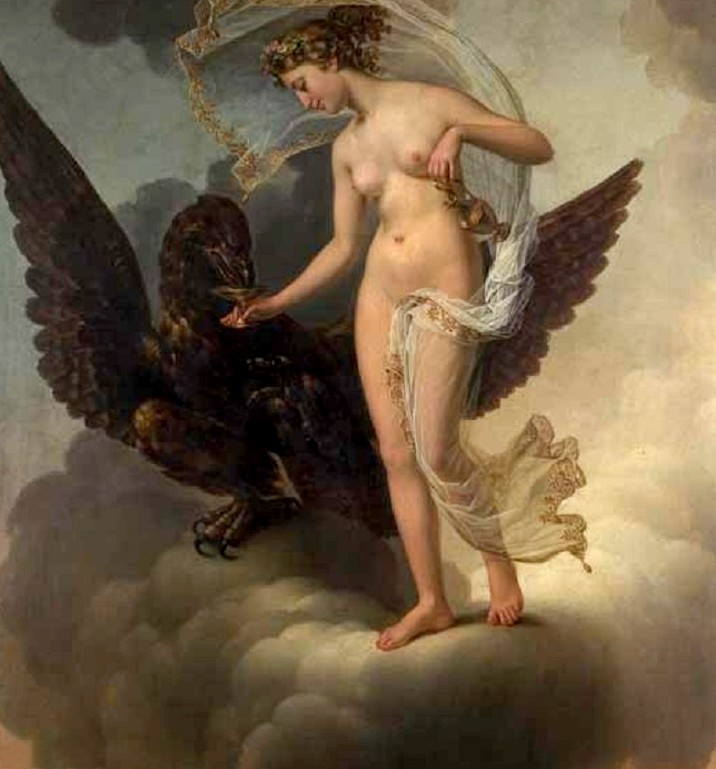
Charles Picqué, 1826

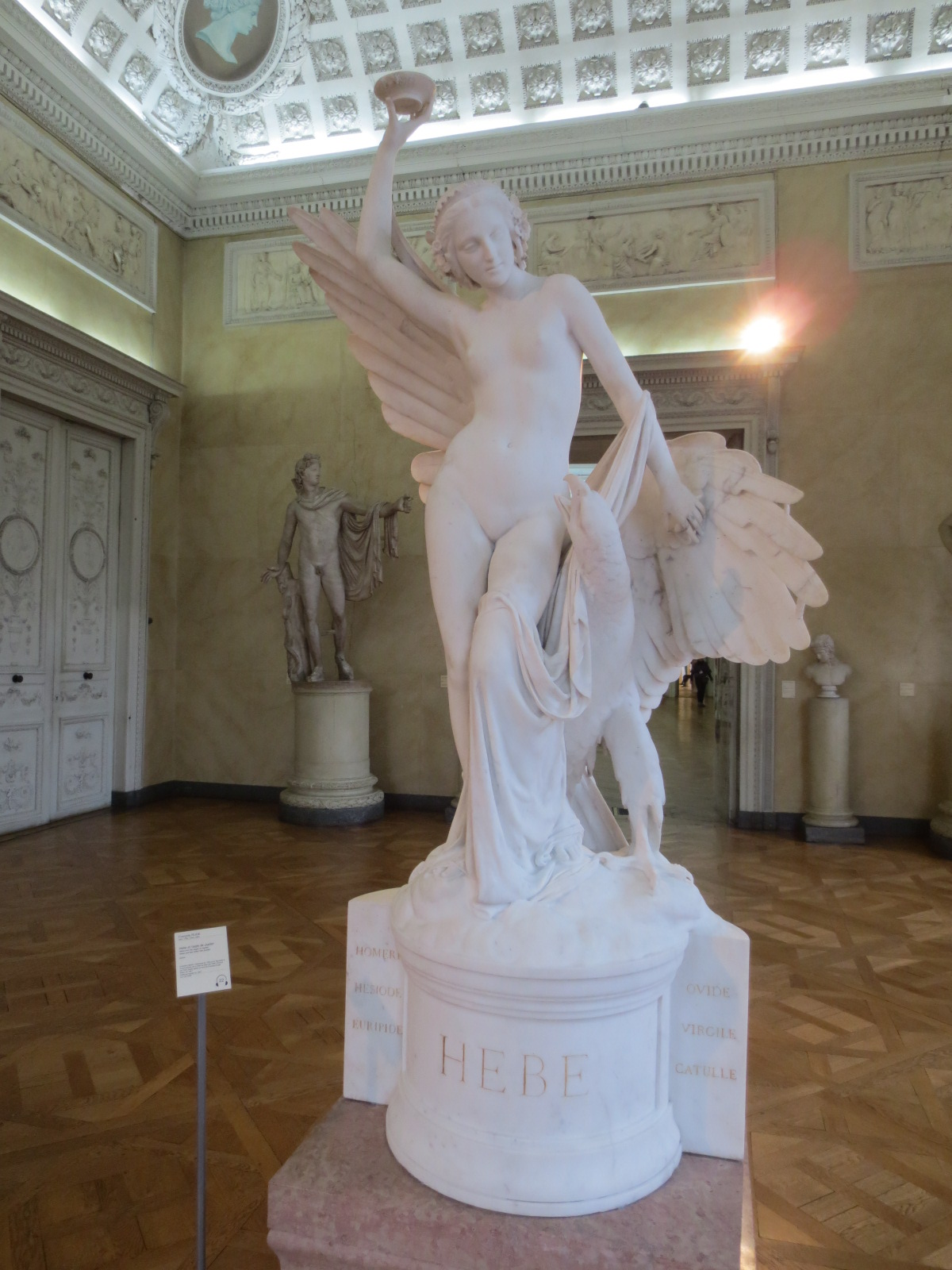
The Dijon marble group by François Rude

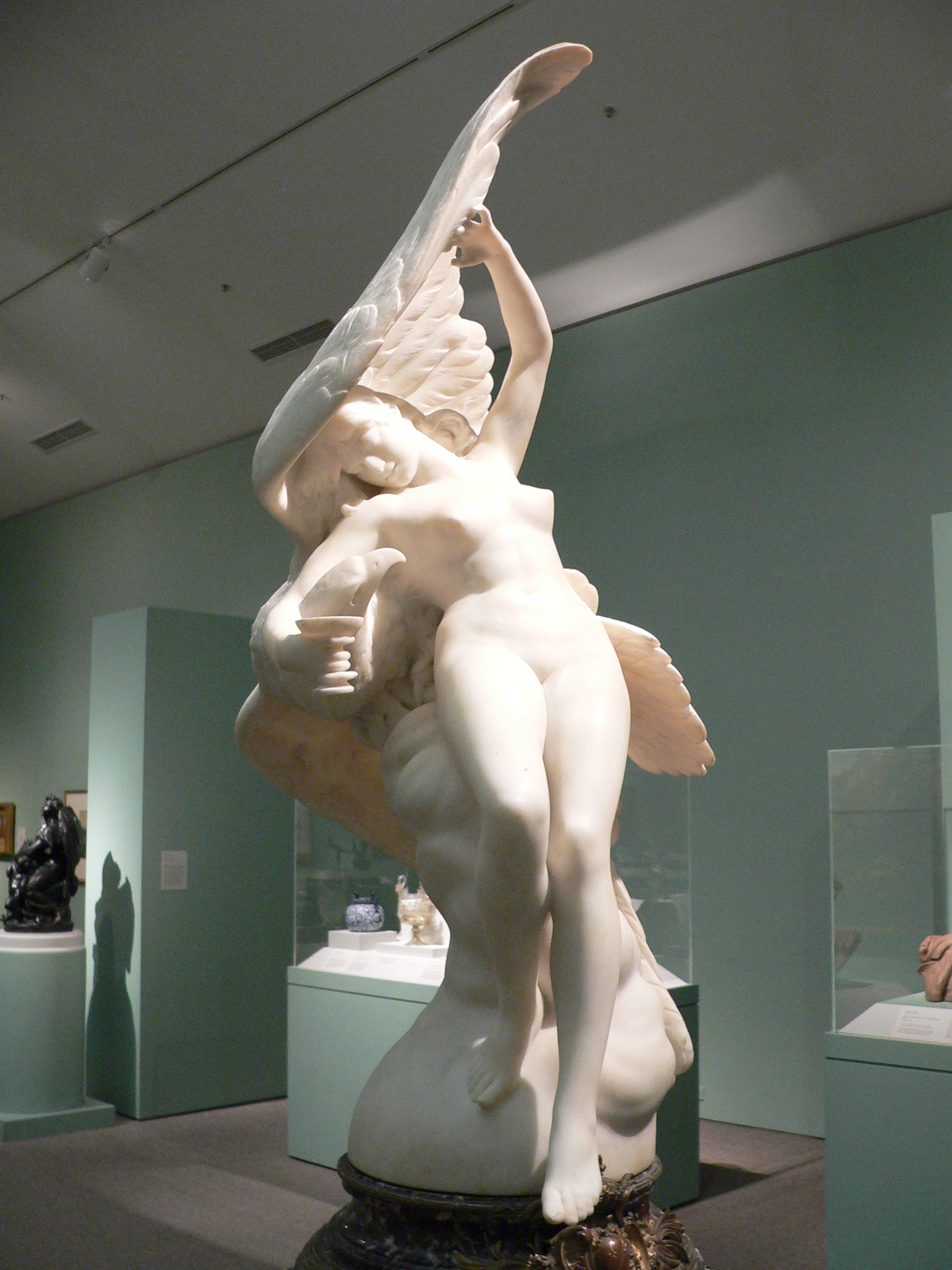
Jean Coulon, about 1886

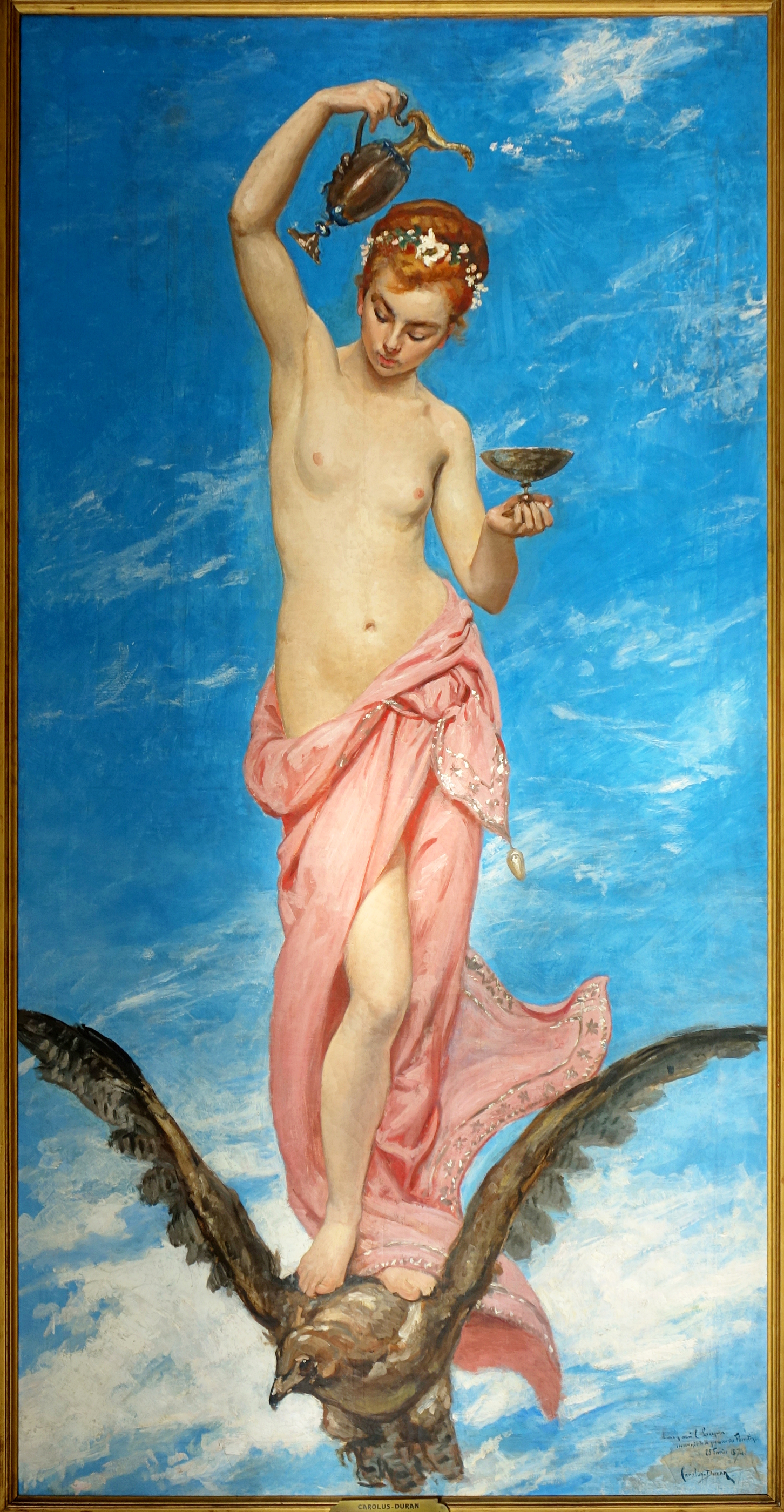
Carolus-Duran; usually a portraitist, but not here

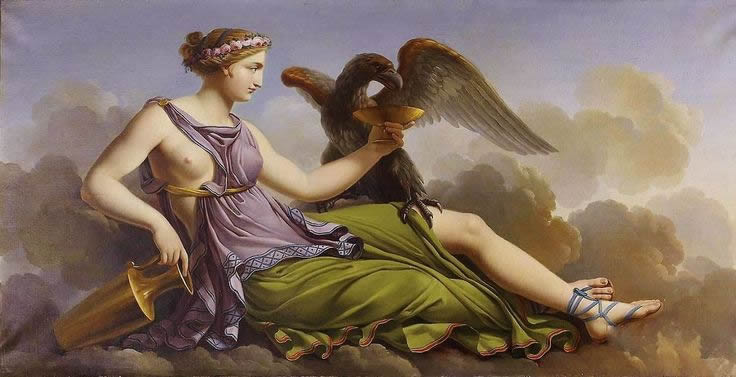
Hebe by Jacques Louis Dubois (French), 19th century

== Genealogy ==
Hebe's family tree

Uranus	Gaia
Cronus	Rhea
Alcmene	Zeus	Hera
a
b
Heracles	HEBE	Ares	Eileithyia	Hephaestus
Alexiares	Anicetus

== See also ==
- Geras
- Iðunn

== Notes ==
Preceded by Deianira	Wives of Heracles	Succeeded by ---
