= Soulforce (disambiguation) =

Soulforce is an American LGBT-issue-focused social justice and civil rights organization.

Soulforce, soul-force or soul force may also refer to:

- Soul-force, a component of Satyagraha, a philosophy and practice of nonviolent resistance

== See also ==
- Soulforce Revolution, a 1989 release of the punk band 7 Seconds
- Life force (disambiguation)
