= Religion of Māori people =

The Māori people have a Polynesian religion that, prior to the introduction of Christianity to New Zealand was the main religious belief for Māori. By 1845, more than half of the Māori population attended church and Christianity remains the largest religion for Māori. Very few Māori still follow traditional Māori religion, although many elements of it are still observed. Several Māori religious movements have been born out of Christianity, such as the Rātana movement.

== Traditional Māori religion ==
Traditional Māori religion, the pre-European belief-system of the Māori, differed little from that of their perceived homeland, Hawaiki Nui, aka Raʻiātea or Raiatea, conceiving of everything – including natural elements and all living things – as connected by common descent through whakapapa or genealogy. Accordingly, Māori regarded all things as possessing a life force or mauri. Illustrating this concept of connectedness through genealogy are the major personifications dating from before the period of European contact:

- Tangaroa was the personification of the ocean and the ancestor or origin of all fish.
- Tāne was the personification of the forest and the origin of all birds.
- Rongo was the personification of peaceful activities and agriculture and the ancestor of cultivated plants.
- Tāwhirimātea was the personification of wind or the storms and weather.

(Some sources reference a supreme personification: Io; however this idea remains controversial.)

=== Tapu and mana ===
Māori followed certain practices that relate to traditional concepts like tapu. Certain people and objects contain mana – meaning prestige or authority, often as a spiritual essence. In earlier times, tribal members of a higher rank would not touch objects which belonged to members of a lower rank – to do so would constitute "pollution"; and persons of a lower rank could not touch the belongings of a highborn person without putting themselves at risk of death. "According to Best, Māori politics was 'almost... theocratic', since 'fear of the gods was the strongest preserver of order. [...]'"

The word tapu can be interpreted as "sacred", as "spiritual restriction" or as "implied prohibition"; it involves rules and prohibitions. Two kinds of tapu operate: private tapu (relating to individuals) and public tapu (relating to communities). A person, an object or a place which is tapu may not be touched by human contact, or in some cases, not even approached. A person, object or a place could be made sacred by tapu for a certain time.

In Māori society prior to European contact, tapu was one of the strongest forces in Māori life. A violation of tapu could have dire consequences, including the death of the offender through sickness or at the hands of someone affected by the offence. In earlier times food cooked for a person of high rank was tapu, and could not be eaten by an inferior. A chief's house was tapu, and even the chief could not eat food in the interior of his house. Not only were the houses of people of high rank perceived to be tapu, but also their possessions – including their clothing. Burial grounds (Māori: urupā) and places of death were always tapu, and protective fencing often surrounded such areas.

In the 21st century, Māori still observe tapu in matters relating to sickness, death, and burial:

- Tangihanga or funeral rites may take two or three days. The deceased lies in state, usually in an open coffin flanked by female relatives dressed in black, their heads sometimes wreathed in kawakawa leaves, who take few and short breaks. During the day, visitors come, sometimes from great distances despite only a distant relationship, to address the deceased. They may speak frankly of his or her faults as well as virtues, but singing and joking are also appropriate. Free expression of grief by both men and women is encouraged. Mourners may invoke traditional beliefs and tell the deceased to return to the ancestral homeland, Hawaiki, by way of te rerenga wairua, the spirits' journey. The close kin or kiri mate ("dead skin") may not speak. On the last night, the pō whakamutunga (night of ending), the mourners hold a vigil and at sunrise the coffin is closed, before a church or marae funeral service and/or graveside interment ceremony, invariably Christian, takes place. It is traditional for mourners to wash their hands in water and to sprinkle some on their heads before leaving a cemetery. After the burial rites are completed, a feast is traditionally served. Mourners are expected to provide koha or gifts towards the meal. After the burial, the home of the deceased and the place they died are ritually cleansed with karakia (prayers or incantations) and desanctified with food and drink, in a ceremony called takahi whare (trampling the house). That night, the pō whakangahau (night of entertainment) is a night of relaxation and rest. The widow or widower is not left alone for several nights following.
- During the following year, the kinfolk of a prominent deceased person will visit other marae, "bringing the death" (kawe mate) to them. They carry pictures of the deceased person on to the marae.
- Unveilings of headstones (hura kōwhatu) usually take place about a year after a death, often on a public holiday to accommodate visitors who could not get to the tangihanga. The dead are remembered and more grief expressed.

== Christianity ==
On Christmas Day in 1814, at Oihi Bay, a small cove in Rangihoua Bay in the Bay of Islands, at the invitation of chiefs Te Pahi and Ruatara, the Reverend Samuel Marsden of the Anglican Church Missionary Society (CMS) conducted the first Christian service on New Zealand land. The 1837 'Māori New Testament' published by the CMS missionary and printer William Colenso was the first of the Bible translations into Oceanic languages. Demand for it and for the Prayer Book that followed grew exponentially, as did Christian Māori led and public Christian services, with 33,000 Māori attending regularly. Understanding of the Bible increased mana and social and economic benefits, decreased intertribal violence, and increased peace and respect for all people in Māori society, including women, and decreasing slavery.

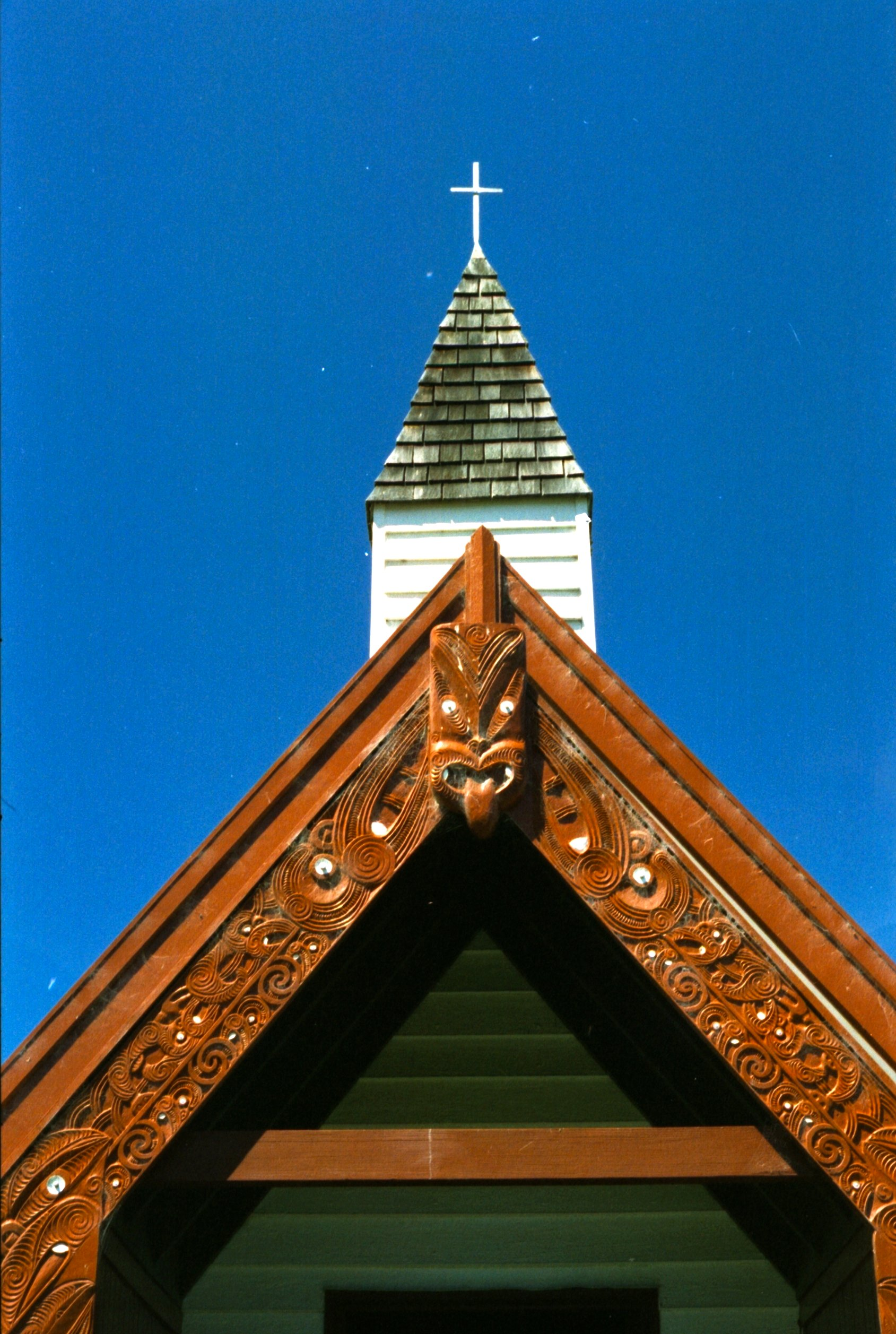
Māori Christian church in Akaroa. Christianity was adopted by Māori across New Zealand during the 19th century.

In 1845, 64,000 Māori were attending church services, over half of the estimated population of 110,000. By then, there was probably a higher proportion of Māori attending Church in New Zealand than British people in the United Kingdom. Large numbers of converts joined the Church of England and the Roman Catholic Church, both of which are still highly influential in Māori society. The New Zealand Anglican Church, te Hāhi Mihinare (the missionary church), was the largest Māori denomination. Māori made Christianity their own and spread it throughout the country often before European missionaries arrived

The Māori aspect of the Anglican Church in Aotearoa New Zealand has long been recognised by the ordination of Māori priests as Bishop of Aotearoa; a well-known and sometimes controversial holder of that title was the late Most Rev. Sir Whakahuihui Vercoe, who is remembered for a speech he delivered in the presence of Queen Elizabeth II during a Waitangi Day ceremony. The Roman Catholic Church also ordains Māori to high positions. Other churches, including the Presbyterian Church and the Church of Jesus Christ of Latter-day Saints also gained Māori converts from the 1880s on, and by 1901 there were nearly 4,000 Māori members in 79 branches of the Church of Jesus Christ of Latter-day Saints.

Today, Māori Christians incorporate Christian prayer into Māori karakia.

== Christian syncretism ==
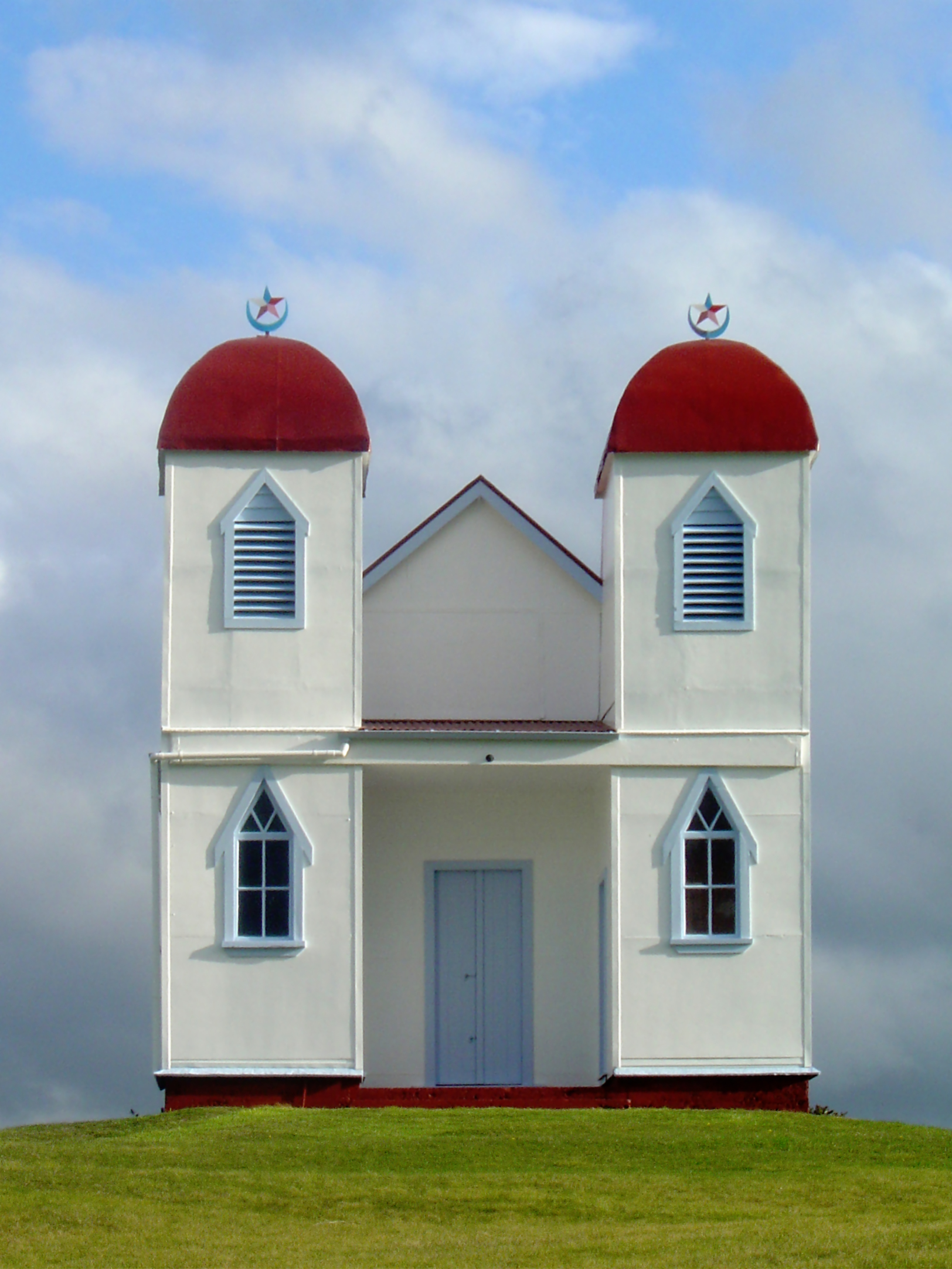
Rātana church near Raetihi

In the 19th and early 20th centuries, several new Māori Christian sects arose, combining various aspects of Christianity with Māori philosophies. These include:

- Nākahi cult of Papahurihia, 1830s
- Pai Mārire ("Hauhau"), 1863
- Ringatū, 1868
- Church of the Seven Rules of Jehovah, 1890s
- followers of Rua Kēnana Hepetipa at Maungapōhatu, 1905
- Te Haahi Rātana, 1925

In the 2006 New Zealand Census, 16,419 people stated their religion as Ringatū, and 50,565 Rātana. The Rātana Church has also had considerable political strength.

== Other religions ==
Islam

The proportion of Māori followers of Islam is low. Although the number of Māori Muslims grew rapidly at the end of the 20th century to 1,074 at the 2006 census, the total number of New Zealanders identifying as Māori was 565,329. Thus, the total number of identified Māori Muslims was 0.19 per cent of the Māori population in 2006. This dropped to 0.1 per cent in the 2018 census.

== See also ==
- Māori culture
- Religion in New Zealand
- Raʻiātea
