= Alexiares and Anicetus =

Sons of Heracles in Greek mythology

According to the Bibliotheca of Apollodorus, Anicetus or Aniketos (Ancient Greek: Ἀνίκητος, lit. 'unconquered, unconquerable') and Alexiares (Ἀλεξιάρης) are sons of the goddess Hebe and Heracles after his apotheosis.

== Cult ==
There is evidence suggesting that Anicetus and Alexiares might have been worshipped in places such as Thebes and Rhodes. Due to the scarcity of historical records, the exact nature and extent of their cult are uncertain.
