= Alexander Zagarov =

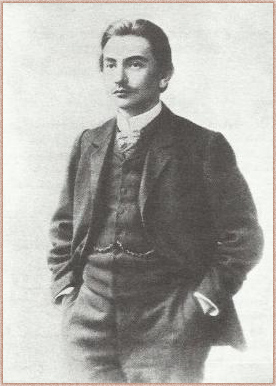
- Born: Alexander Leonidovich von Fessing; Александр Леонидович фон Фессинг; 17 January 1877; Yelisavetgrad, Russian Empire
- Died: 12 November 1941 (aged 64); Saratov, Soviet Union
- Occupations: stage actor, theatre director, reader in drama

Alexander Leonidovich von Fessing (Russian: Александр Леонидович фон Фессинг, 17 January 1877 - 12 November 1941) was a Yelisavetgrad-born Russian and Ukrainian, Soviet actor and theatre director, better known under his stage name Zagarov (Загаров).

A Moscow Philharmonic Drama School graduate (where he studied under Vladimir Nemirovich-Danchenko), Zagarov joined the Moscow Art Theatre (where his father was an administrator) (Note: Leonid Alexandrovich von Fessing (22.4.1847 — 11.2.1920), a retired army colonel, served as a MAT senior inspector from the Stanislavski's troupe's inception 1898 till his death. A somewhat eccentric figure, fond of order and trimness, and certainly a comic character in some of the MAT actor's memoirs, he was much admired for his kindness by everybody, including Stanislavski himself.) in 1898 and stayed with it (with breaks) until 1906. His best-known roles here included Kleshch (The Lower Depths), Sorin (The Seagull), Publius and Pindarus (Julius Caesar). All the while he worked in the Yaroslavl theatre (where he debuted as a director in 1901), was actively involved with Meyerhold's New Drama and (since 1901) read drama at the Philharmonic Drama School.

In 1909-1910 he headed the Korsh Theatre; then moved to Alexandrinka to act and direct (1910-1916). After 1917 Zagarov worked for ten years in Ukraine. From 1921 to 1927 while in exile, he directed at the Ukrainian Discourse Theatre and Uzhgorod Theater "Prosvita". He taught at the Lviv Drama School, and published letters to defend the Ukrainian language in Western Ukraine. In 1924 he played the role of a Ukrainian peasant in the German film "Golden Wolf". He headed the city theatres in Kiev and Kharkiv, and co-founded the Donetsk Music and Drama Theatre. Later he worked in Penza, Vladivostok, Khabarovsk, Kovrov and Saratov. In 1940 Zagarov was honoured with the title Meritorious Practitioner of Arts of RSFSR. "The master of high culture, tireless experimenter and a proponent of the Stanislavski and Nemirovich-Danchenko's ideas," was how the Theatre Encyclopedia described him.
