= Ukrainska Besida Theatre =

First Ukrainian professional theatre (1864–1924)

The Ukrainian National Home in Lviv, 1864
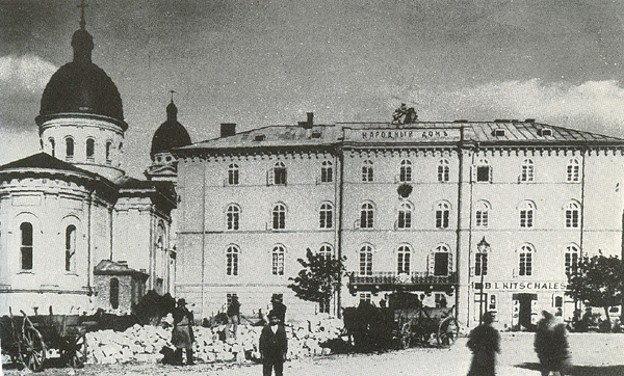
- Home of the Ukrainska Besida Theatre
- Type: Theatre group
- Purpose: Ukrainian Language Theatre
- Location: Lviv, Ukraine
- Coordinates: 49°49′48″N 24°00′51″E
- Artistic director: Omelian Bachynsky

The Ukrainska Besida Theatre (Ukrainian: Театр Української Бесіди, romanized: Teatr Ukrainskoi Besidy, lit. 'Theatre of the Ukrainian conversation'; until 1916: Ruska (Note: For more information, please see Rusyny / Ruthenian versus Russki / Russian.) Besida Theatre, Театр Руської Бесіди, Teatr Ruskoi Besidy) was the first Ukrainian professional theatre in operation from 1864 to 1924. Its first performance took place in the premises of The Ukrainian Narodnyi dim building in Lviv. The theatre was subsidized by the Ruska Besida Society in Lviv and occasionally supported by the Galician Diet.

== Beginnings ==
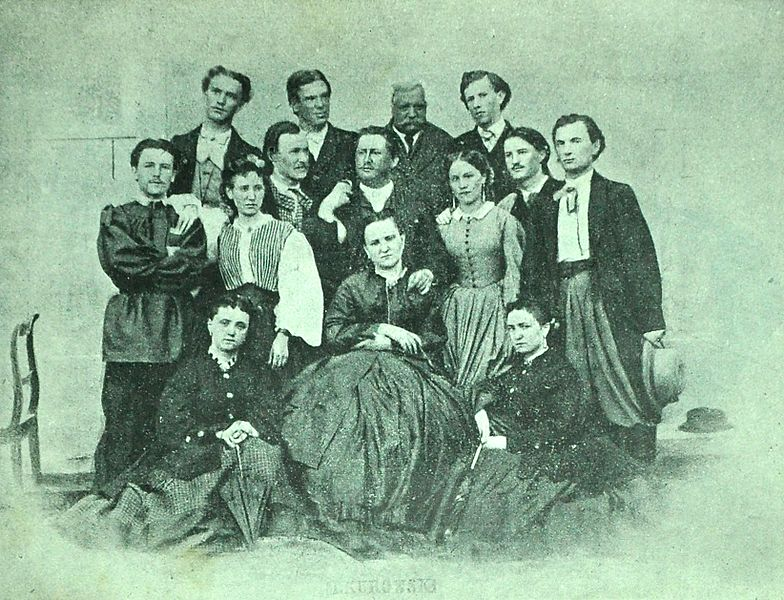
Ruska Besida Theatre company, 1864

Ruska Besida ("Ruthenian conversation") was a society, which arranged literary, musical and dance evenings, concerts, balls and lectures. One of its tasks became the organization of a theatre. In 1861, Yuliian Hryhorovych Lavrivskyi wrote in a newspaper article: "If we want our language to thrive... we must see that it will be more involved in public use and... we think that the best help here could be to establish a theatre in Lviv... the theatre will enlighten us of our history, will define the past, and will help us to love this great land, by stirring up admiration for our poetry and art".

In January 1864, the director of the newly created theatre became Omelian Vasylovych Bachynskyi, who had been a theatre director in Zhytomyr. On March 29, 1864, in The Ukrainian National Home (Narodnyi dim) in Lviv, the opening of the first Ukrainian professional theatre took place. It premiered with the play Marusia based on the novel by Hryhorii Kvitka-Osnovianenko.

== Growth ==
Kost Levytskyi wrote: "Actors of rank and students hurried to join the theatre, to devote themselves to the development of their native drama". There was great excitement, for the Ukrainians realized that their language, which was pushed aside publicly, would lead to a revival of the spirit of the people. The theatre sent troupes beyond Lviv, to tour Kolomyia, Stanyslaviv, and Chernivtsi. At the end of 1864 the company toured through Sambir and Przemyśl. Their repertoire was replenished with new pieces, and translations. Some actors of the theatre also performed on the Polish stage, and this exchange of stage experiences caused the artistic level of the domestic repertoire on the Galician scene to rise.

== Golden Age ==
For the director Teofila Fedorivna Romanovych, the theatre was driven by a good acting structure and the increase of the repertoire. She prepared the ground for Ivan Biberovych and Ivan Mykolaiovych Hrynevetskyi, whose period of directorship was called the "Golden Age of the Galician theatre". They introduced Ukrainian historical drama by Pavlo Yakovych Barvinskyi, household drama by Mykhailo Starytsky, and bourgeois drama by Hryhorii Ivanovych Tsehlynskyi; operas by Mykola Lysenko and Semen Hulak-Artemovsky; and added the Western European dramas of Friedrich Schiller, Eugène Scribe, Heinrich von Kleist, Carlo Goldoni, as well as operettas by Jacques Offenbach and Johann Strauss II.

== The theatre in 1908 ==
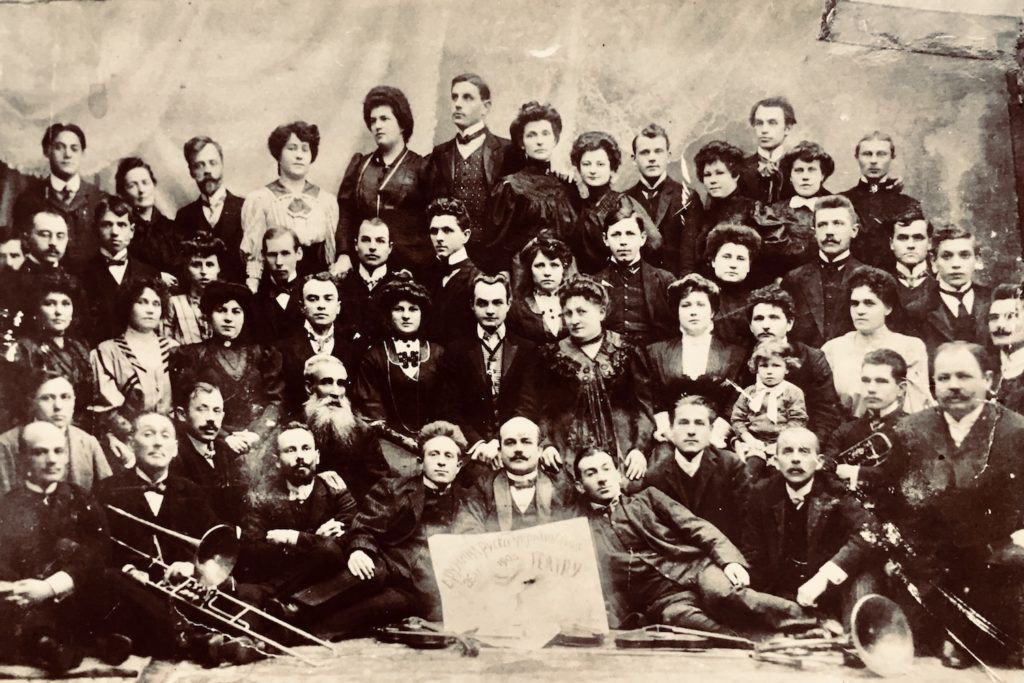
Ruska Besida Theatre, 1908

After a certain decline, the theatre again rose with the directorship of Joseph (Yosyp) Dmytrovych Stadnyk, mainly due to the spread of Western European opera repertoire and European drama. The theatre put on vaudeville, melodrama, operetta, translated pieces of Western European playwrights, and performed their own Ukrainian dramatists.

German writers Hermann Sudermann, Gotthold Ephraim Lessing, Gerhart Hauptmann; Scandinavian writers Henrik Ibsen, August Strindberg; French writers Edmond Rostand, Pierre Beaumarchais, Molière; English writers Oscar Wilde, George Bernard Shaw, and William Shakespeare (translated by Ivan Franko) could be seen on their stage. The writings of Nikolai Gogol were performed, as well as of the Russian writers Leo Tolstoy and Anton Chekhov; the work of Polish playwrights Aleksander Fredro and Stanisław Przybyszewski also graced their stage.

Besides the Ukrainian operas of Mykola Lysenko and Mykola Arkas, Ukrainians were introduced for the first time to such operas as: La Juive by Fromental Halévy, Madama Butterfly by Giacomo Puccini, Carmen by Georges Bizet, La traviata by Giuseppe Verdi, Faust by Charles Gounod, The Tales of Hoffmann by Jacques Offenbach, Cavalleria rusticana by Pietro Mascagni, The Bartered Bride by Bedřich Smetana, Halka by Stanisław Moniuszko, and others.

== Legacy ==
The theatre became part of an awakening of a national consciousness for Ukrainians and acquired not only a lasting place in the history of the Galician rebirth, but also greatly contributed to the rise of the modern Ukrainian theatre in Central and Eastern Ukraine.

== Theatre directors ==
Artistic Directors	Years
Omelian Bachynsky (Омелян Васильович Бачинський)	1864 - 1867
Antin Molentsky (Антон Матвійович Моленцький)	1869 – 1873
Marko Kropyvnytsky (Марко Лукич Кропивницький)	1875
Teofila Romanovych (Теофіла Федорівна Романович)	1874 – 1880
Ivan Hrynevetsky (Іван Миколайович Гриневецький)	1881 - 1889
Ivan Biberovych (Іван Біберович)	1881-1889 (with Hrynevetsky); 1889 - 1892 (by himself)
Mikhail Hubchak (Михайло Ігнатович Губчак)	1901 – 1904
Mykola Sadovsky (Микола Садовський)	(1905–6)
Yosyp Stadnyk (Йосип Дмитрович Стадник)	1906 – 1913
Roman Siretsky (Роман Сирецький) and Stepan Charnetsky (Степан Чарнецький)	(1913–14)

In July 1924, because of the lack of funds, the theatre ceased to exist.

== Notable alumni ==
- Amvrosy Buchma (1891 – 1957), Ukrainian actor and director
- Ivan Franko, (1856 –1916), Ukrainian poet, writer, social and literary critic, journalist, translator
- Marko Kropyvnytskyi, (1840 – 1910), Ukrainian writer, dramaturge, composer, theatre actor and director
- Les Kurbas, (1887–1937), considered by many to be the most important Ukrainian theatre director of the 20th century
- Kateryna Rubchakova, (1881–1919), Ukrainian actress of universal transformation and a singer in lyrical soprano, Prima donna of the Galician Theater
- Irena Turkevycz-Martynec, (1899 – 1983), a Prima donna in the Lviv Theatre of Opera and Ballet
- Mykola Voronyi, (1871–1938), Ukrainian writer, poet, actor, director, and political activist
- Alexander Zagarov, (1877–1941), Russian and Ukrainian, Soviet actor and theatre director, better known under his stage name Zagarov (Загаров)

== Bibliography ==
- Чарнецький С. Нарис історії українського театру в Галичині. Львів, 1934.
- Лужницький Г. З історії українського театру. — Київ, ч. 2 — 4 і 2. Філадельфія 1953. — С. 54.
- Лужницький Г. Зах.-євр. репертуар в українському театрі.
- Львівський театр товариства «Українська Бесіда». 1915—1924 / О. О. Боньковська; Наук. т-во ім. Шевченка в Америці, НАН України. Ін-т народознав., Ін-т мистецтвознав., фольклористики та етнології ім. М. Т. Рильського. — Л. : Літопис, 2003. — 340 c. — (Мистец. театру). — Бібліогр.: с. 310—325.
- Альманах «Гомону України» на 1959. — Торонто, 1958.
- Проскуряков В., Ямаш Ю. Архітектура українських театрів. Простір і дія. — Друге видання, виправлене і доповнене. — Львів: Видавництво Львівської політехніки; Видавництво «Срібне слово», 2004. — 584 с.
