= Teofila Bogumiła Glińska =

Polish poet, best known for being one of the first Polish Romantic poets (?-1799)

Teofila Bogumiła Glińska (died 1799) was a Polish poet. She published poems in the style of the Enlightenment; they are regarded as having been among the first poems in Poland written in the Romantic sentimentalist style.

== Works ==
- Szczorse, powst. w sierpniu 1784, wyd. J. Chreptowicz, „Magazyn Warszawski” 1785, t. 1, cz. 1, s. 91-93; wyd. następne oprac. T. Mikulski, „Pamiętnik Literacki”, rocznik 41 (1950), zeszyt 3/4, przedr. w: Ze studiów nad Oświeceniem, Warszawa 1956.
- Hymn Peruanów o śmierci. Z prozy Inkasów pana Marmontela wyjęty i na wiersz przełożony, wyd. J. Chreptowicz, „Magazyn Warszawski” 1785, t. 1, cz. 1, s. 99-103; wyd. następne oprac. T. Mikulski, „Pamiętnik Literacki”, rocznik 41 (1950), zeszyt 3/4, przedr. w: Ze studiów nad Oświeceniem, Warszawa 1956.
- Bukiet od córki dla matki w dzień imienin tejże, powst. przed rokiem 1790, z rękopisu: Życie Ignacego Bykowskiego, porucznika wojsk rosyjskich, przez niego samego napisane w roku 1808, wyd. i przedr. T. Mikulski, „Pamiętnik Literacki”, rocznik 41 (1950), zeszyt 3/4, przedr. w: Ze studiów nad Oświeceniem, Warszawa 1956.
- Od tejże, w wilią rocznicy ojca, powst. przed rokiem 1790, z rękopisu wyd. i przedr. T. Mikulski, „Pamiętnik Literacki”, rocznik 41 (1950), zeszyt 3/4, przedr. w: Ze studiów nad Oświeceniem, Warszawa 1956.
- Wiersze imć panny Glińskiej na obraz j. o. księżny Massalskiej, hetmanowy W. Ks. Lit., przez imci p. Szmuglewicza malowany... w Wilnie. Myśli na ustroniu, odpisy rękopiśmienne z XVIII wieku w Bibliotece Jagiellońskiej, sygn. 6214/III.

== Sources ==
- T. 4: Oświecenie. W: Bibliografia Literatury Polskiej – Nowy Korbut. Warszawa: Państwowy Instytut Wydawniczy, 1966, s. 469-470.
