= Teofila Fedorovna Romanovich =

Ukrainian stage actor and theatre director

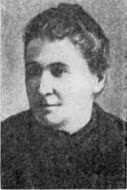
Portrait of Teofila Fedorovna Romanovich.

Teofila Fedorovna Romanovich (Ukrainian: Теофіля Романович; May 16, 1842 – January 1924 in Chernivtsi) was a Ukrainian actress and theatre director in Austria-Hungary.

She was the manager of the Ukrainian Discourse Theatre in 1874 – 1880.
