= Teofila Działyńska (Szołdrska-Potulicka) =

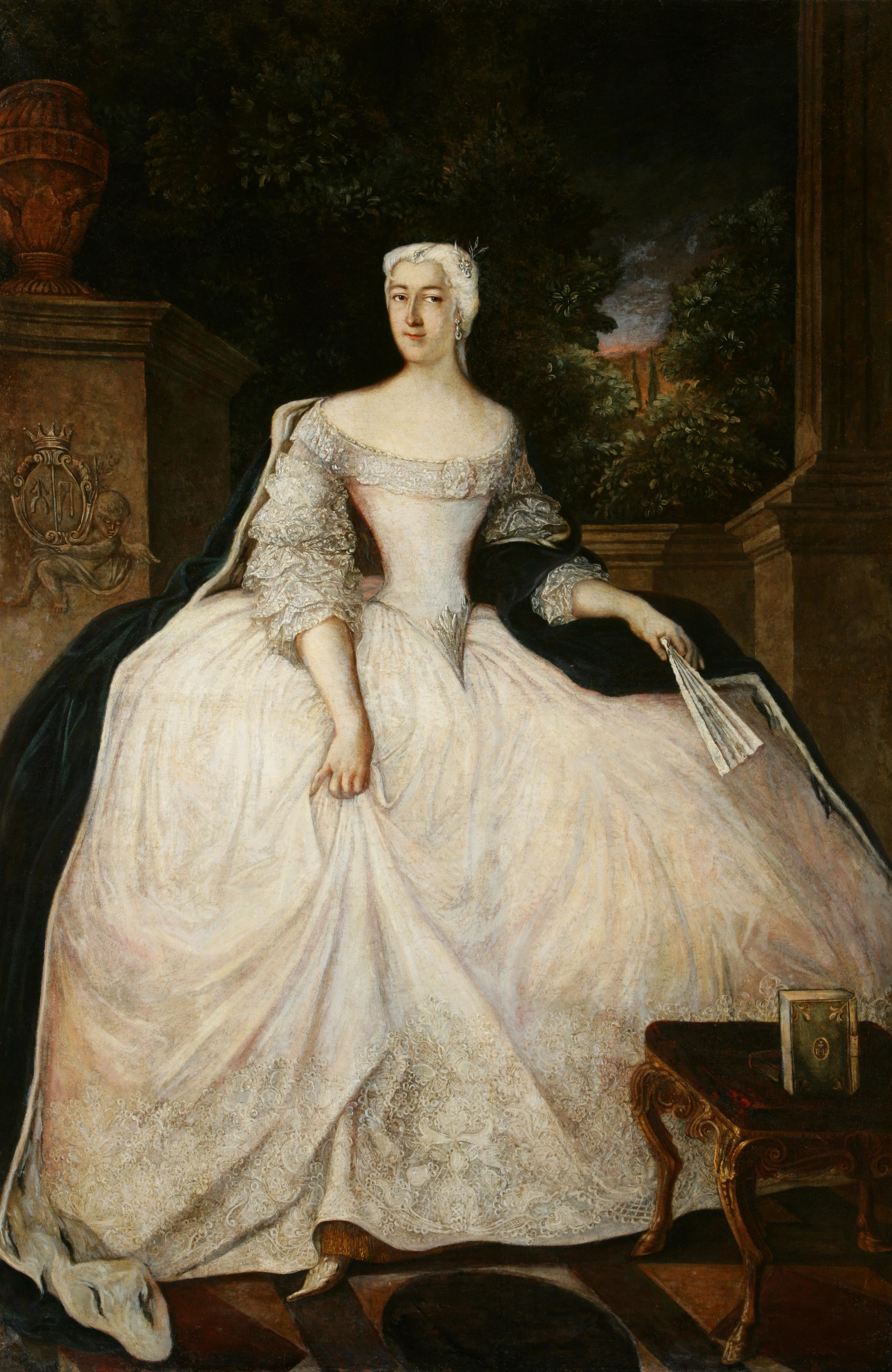
- Portrait by Antoine Pesne
- Born: December 28, 1714; Kórnik
- Died: November 26, 1790 (aged 75); Kórnik
- Noble family: Działyńscy (of the Ogończyk coat of arms)
- Spouses: Stefan Maciej Szołdrski; Aleksander Potulicki
- Issue: Feliks Antoni Ignacy Szołdrski
- Father: Zygmunt Działyński
- Mother: Teresa Tarłówna

Teofila Działyńska, née Działyńska, primo voto Szołdrska, secundo voto Potulicka (28 December 1714 – 26 November 1790), was a Polish noblewoman and landowner. She was the owner of Kórnik Castle and its surrounding estates.

In Polish popular culture, she is known as the “White Lady” (Biała Dama), a legendary ghost said to haunt Kórnik Castle, inspired by her portrait preserved there.

== Coat of arms ==
The Ogończyk coat of arms, borne by the Działyński family

Teofila Działyńska belonged to the Działyński noble family, which bore the Ogończyk coat of arms, one of the oldest Polish heraldic emblems.

== Legacy ==
Teofila Działyńska is traditionally associated with the legend of the White Lady of Kórnik, one of the most famous castle ghost stories in Poland. According to local tradition, her spirit appears at night dressed in white, wandering through the castle halls.

The legend is closely connected to her portrait, attributed to Antoine Pesne, which hangs in Kórnik Castle and has become a central element of the story.

== Burial ==
She was buried in Kórnik, where her tombstone is preserved.
