= Viera (given name) =

Viera is a female given name, similar to Vera. It means "faith" in the Slavic languages, though it is sometimes associated with the Latin word "verus", "true" (both words are derived from the PIE *weh₁ro- "true"). It was formerly a nickname for Vieroslava, and is pronounced vyeh-rah.

== Name days ==
The name is celebrated on various name days.

- Czech: 8 October
- Slovak: 5 October
- French: 18 September
- Latvian: 17 September
- Bulgarian: 17 September
- Russian: 30 September
- Swedish: 30 May

== Notable persons with this name ==
- Viera Janárceková (1941–2023), Slovak pianist and composer
- Viera Scheibner (born 1935), Slovak paleontologist and anti-vaccination activist
- Viera Schottertova (born 1982), Slovak model
- Viera Strnisková (1929–2013), Slovak actress
- Viera Tomanová (born 1948), Slovak politician and Minister of Labor
