= Sona (given name) =

- Gender: Female

Origin
- Meaning: gold; wisdom

Sona is a feminine name meaning gold. Sona is also called to a beloved one, someone very close to heart. The name is more common in countries such as Armenia, Azerbaijan, Turkey and India. It can be found in many other communities and nations too (with similar meanings). Spelling may sometimes vary to 'Suna' or 'سونا'.

== People with this given name ==
=== Business ===
- Sona Mehring, American businesswoman, founder of CaringBridge

=== Films and television ===
- Sona Heiden, Indian film actress
- Sona MacDonald (born 1961), Austrian-American actress and singer
- Sona Nair, Indian film actress mainly in Malayalam films
- Soňa Valentová (1946–2022), Slovak actress
- Sona Movsesian, American media personality and assistant to late-night talk show host Conan O'Brien

=== Music ===
- Sona Aslanova (1924–2011), Soviet Azerbaijani soprano
- Soňa Červená (1925–2023), Czech operatic mezzo-soprano
- Sona Ghazarian (born 1945), Armenian-Austrian operatic soprano
- Sona Jobarteh, vocalist, multi-instrumentalist, and composer from the Gambia and the UK
- Sona MacDonald (born 1961), Austrian-American actress and singer
- Sona Mohapatra, Indian singer, music composer, and lyricist
- Sona (singer), Armenian singer
- Sona Tata Condé, Guinean musician

=== Politics ===
- Soňa Pennigerová (born 1928), Czech politician
- Sona Ram, Indian politician, Colonel

=== Sports ===
- Sona Ahmadli (born 1988), female wrestler from Azerbaijan
- Soňa Nováková (full name Soňa Nováková-Dosoudilová, born 1975), Czech beach volleyball player
- Soňa Pertlová (1988–2011), Czech chess player
- Sona Shahinyan (born 1992), Armenian professional female football player
- Sona Taumalolo (born 1981), Tongan born New Zealand-based rugby union player

=== Literature ===
- Soňa Čechová (1930–2007), Slovak translator

== Fictional characters ==
- Sona Buvelle, Maven of the Strings, a playable champion character in the multiplayer online battle arena video game League of Legends
- Sona Sitri, a character in Highschool DxD
- Sona Carstairs, a character in the Shadowhunter Chronicles series
- Sona, called Flametail in-game, a playable character in the tactical RPG/tower defense video game Arknights.
