= Teofila Radziwiłł =

Polish noblewoman (fl. 1781)

Teofila Radziwiłł (fl. 1781) was a Polish noblewoman and Freemason. She was the Grand Mistress of the Female Adoption Lodge, Masonic Lodge of Excellent Faith, from 1781.

She was the daughter of Leon Michał Radziwiłł and Anna Mycielska and married and Hermann Gustaw Fersen.
