= Life force =

Life force or lifeforce may refer to:

== Philosophy and religion ==
- Energy (esotericism), a term used by various esoteric forms of spirituality and alternative medicine
  - Prana, the Sanskrit word for "life force" or "vital principle"
  - Qi, a vital force in traditional Chinese philosophy
  - Élan vital, a hypothetical explanation for evolution and development of organisms
- Spirit (vital essence), a vital principle or animating force within all living things
- Vijñāna, an Indic term for ideas related to discernment, mind/consciousness, life force, etc.
- Vitalism, a belief about living organisms
- Vitality, the capacity to live, grow, or develop

== Art and entertainment ==
=== Film and television ===
- Lifeforce (film), a 1985 science fiction horror film
- Life Force (TV series), a British science fiction television series
- LifeForce, a fictional organization in the television series The Last Breakthrough

=== Literature ===
- Life Force, a 1992 novel by Fay Weldon
- Life Force: How New Breakthroughs in Precision Medicine Can Transform the Quality of Your Life & Those You Love, a 2022 book by Peter Diamandis, Robert Hariri, and Tony Robbins

=== Music ===
- Life Force (album), a 1967 album by Eric Kloss
- Lifeforce Records, a German independent record label

=== Other uses in arts and entertainment ===
- A Life Force, a 1988 graphic novel by Will Eisner
- Life Force (sculpture), a 1992 sculpture by David Bakalar
- Life Force (video game), a 1986 video game
- Lifeforce, a fictional mutant character in the Marvel Comics group the Dark Riders
