= Theatre of Ukraine =

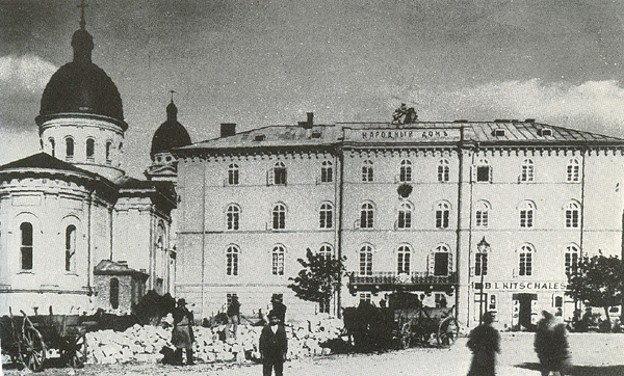
Ukrainian Discourse Theatre in Lviv, Ukraine, 1864

Ukrainian theatre (Ukrainian: Театральне мистецтво України, Teatralne mystetsvo Ukrayiny – Theatric Arts of Ukraine) is a form of fine arts and cultural expression using live actors' performance in front of spectators. Ukrainian theatre draws on the native traditions, language and culture of Ukraine. The first known records of Ukrainian theatre trace back to the early 17th century.

== History ==
=== Origins ===
The origins of Ukrainian theatre go back to ancient folk games, dances, songs and rituals. In the 11th century entertainers known as skomorokhy performed in Ukraine. Pre-Christian performance in Ukraine was enriched by a "deep reverence and respect for the Supreme Being."

=== Medieval and Early Modern eras ===
There were elements of theatre during church ceremonies, evident from the frescoes of Saint Sophia's Cathedral in Kyiv (eleventh century). The Lviv Brotherhood School and Ostroh Academy were considered important centers for the development of religious drama at that time.

The first written references to theatrical performances in Ukraine date back to the second decade of the seventeenth century. The performances were brought from the West by Jesuits who were joining the brotherhood schools and other Ukrainian schools. The performances were used on a large scale as Jesuit propaganda. The texts of some plays, such as "Christmas Day proclamation" by Pamvo Berynda, which was performed in honor of the Bishop of Lviv Jeremiah Tisarovsky (c. 1615 AD), and by Jacob Javantovich (1619 AD) have survived to this day. Records also exist of two Ukrainian plays that were performed to commemorate the death of John the Baptist on August 29, 1619, near Lviv.

=== 17th to 19th centuries ===
In the 17th and 18th centuries the performance of Nativity scenes and Christmas plays at local events spread. Vertep, portable puppet theatres, became popular in the 17th century.

The first stationary theatre in Ukraine was opened in Kharkiv in 1789. In the rest of Ukraine theatrical troupes toured and performed "on the road".

In the early 19th century theatres started to appear in Kyiv (1806), Odessa (1809), and Poltava (1808). In the second half of the 19th century amateur theatre became popular. The first Ukrainian professional theatre (1864–1924) was the Ruska Besida Theatre in Lviv.

In 1882 the Theatre of Coryphaei was founded in the city of Yelisavetgrad.

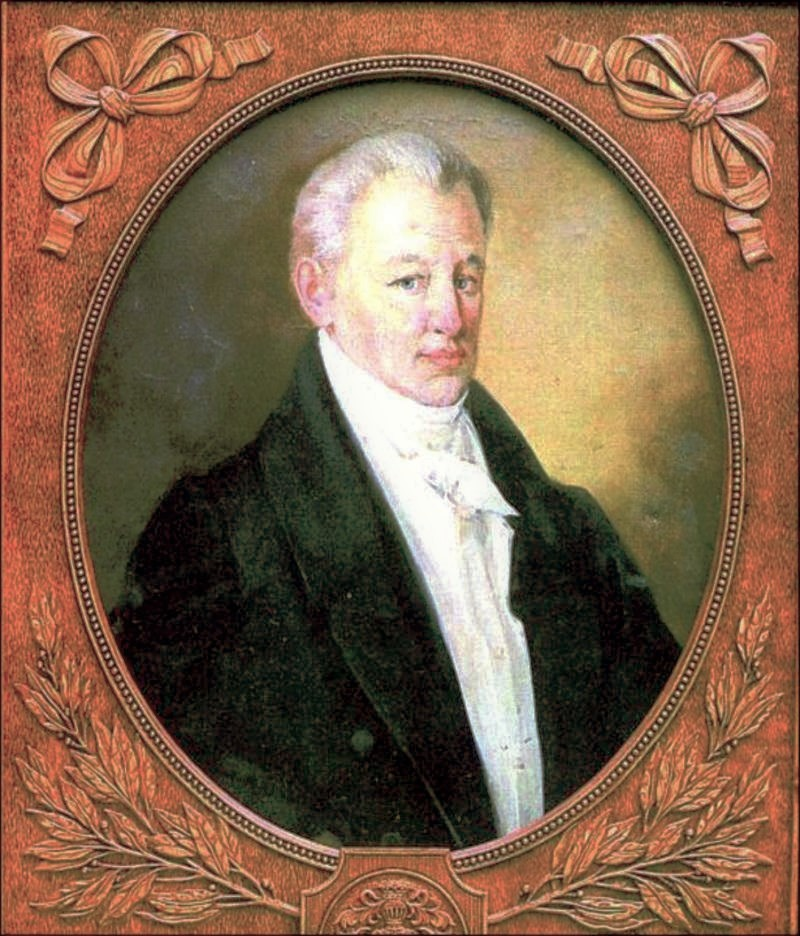
Ivan Kotlyarevsky, one of the founders of Ukrainian literature and theatre

=== 20th century ===
Mykola Sadovsky established the first Ukrainian resident theatre in Kyiv in 1907. Soon after Ukrainian statehood in 1918 the State Drama Theatre was created.

The "Young Theatre" (later the "Berezil Theatre") was created in Kyiv by Les Kurbas and Hnat Yura. Les Kurbas (who worked as a director, actor, dramaturge and interpreter of world literature) brought the works of William Shakespeare, Henrik Ibsen, Gerhart Hauptmann, Friedrich Schiller and Molière to the Ukrainian stage. With the creation of the Berezil Theatre its stage became a sort of experimental ground. Berezil introduced for the first time the plays of renowned Ukrainian writers and dramaturges Mykola Kulish and Volodymyr Vynnychenko. Les Kurbas was repressed during the Stalinist period but is now viewed as a very important source of inspiration for contemporary Ukrainian artists.

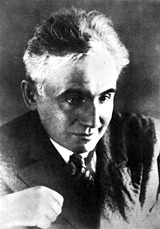
Les Kurbas, before 1933

While the Young Theatre was promoting avant-garde theatre, the State Drama Theatre continued traditions of realism. Ivan Kotlyarevsky, who headed the Poltava Theatre, was viewed as a founder of classical Ukrainian drama, while Hryhoriy Kvitka-Osnovyanenko's plays also found widespread acclaim.

=== Modern ===
In 1988, Volodymyr Kuchynskyi and his colleagues formed the Lviv Young Ukrainian Theatre, which they later renamed the Les Kurbas Theatre. The Les Kurbas Theatre has become the premier avant-garde theatre in Ukraine, receiving recognition and state support from the Ukrainian government.

Ukrainian theatre has been increasingly integrated into European culture, and a number of international theatre festivals are held in Ukraine every year.

== Notable individuals ==
Important Ukrainian playwrights from before 1917 include: Marko Kropyvnytskyi (1840–1910), Ivan Tobilevich (1845–1907), Mykhailo Kotsiubynskyi (1864–1913), Ivan Franko (1856–1916) and Lesia Ukrayinka (1871–1913). From the new era which began after the Communist revolution, important writers include: Mykola Kulish (1892–1937), Ivan Kocherha (1881–1952), Oleksandr Korniychuk (1905–1972) and Oles` Honchar (1918).

Many notable 19th century Ukrainian theatre luminaries started out in amateur theatre, such as Mykhailo Starytsky, Marko Kropyvnytsky and Ivan Karpenko-Karyi. The leading 19th-century female star of the Ukraine was Maria Zankovetska. The renowned theatrical family of Tobilevychi also rose to prominence in the 19th century: Ivan Karpenko-Karyi, Mykola Sadovsky and Panas Saksahansky (stage names) all not only acted and directed but also created their own acting troupes. Their private estate, Khutir Nadia, near Kropyvnytskyi, is a national historic site.

Talented Ukrainian actors who have appeared on the Berezil stage include Amvrosiy Buchma, Maryan Krushelnytsky, Olimpia Dobrovolska, Oleksandr Serdyuk, Natalya Uzhviy, and Yuriy Shumsky.

== Theatre companies ==
Ukrainian theatre includes music-drama theatres, theatres of opera and ballet, theatres of operetta, puppet theatres and others. Ten theatres were officially recognized as national. There are more than 120 theatres (state-funded and independent) in Ukraine, and the audience numbers around 5.6 million per year.

Notable theatres include The Dakh Contemporary Arts Center which opened in 1994.

== Books about Ukrainian drama and theatre ==
History of Ukrainian drama

The book is written by the Ukrainian critic and translator Ivan Stichenko. It consists of five chapters. It is the first illustrated history of Ukrainian theatre. It discusses historical issues about "The Development of Theatre Art", "Latin-Slavic and Latin-German folk rituals", "Drama and the Evangelization of Christianity in Ukraine". The book also gives an analysis of the works of the satirical poet and writer Theophanes Prokopovych.

Theatre and Drama: A Collection of Critical Essays on Dramatic Theatre and Literature

This is a collection of the most important articles of Mykola Kindratovych Voronyi (1871–1938), on the art of theatre and theatre literature, the work of actors and directors, the nature of the audience, and future development of theatre.

== See also ==
- Gogolfest
- List of theatres in Ukraine
- Theatre of Coryphaei

== Bibliography ==
- Larissa M. L. Onyshkevych. „Ukrainian Theater.” In Ethnic Theater in America, 525-48. Ed. Maxine Schwartz Seller. Westport, Conn.: Greenwood Press, 1982. Reprinted as “Ukrainian American Theatre”, in The Ukrainian Heritage in America. Ed. W. Dushnyk. New York, Ukr. Coord.Com. in the U.S., 1991, 221-229.
- Larissa M. L. Onyshkevych. “Toronto’s Avant-Guard Ukrainian Theatre”. The Ukrainian Weekly. April 17, 1986. 9, 15.
- Larissa M. L. Zaleska Onyshkevych. "Volodymyr Kuchynsky’s ‘Les Kurbas Theatre’ from Lviv.” Slavic & East European Performance. 15(422), 2, 1996, 68—73.
- Larissa M. L. Onyshkevych. “Inspector General from Kyiv on Stage in Philadelphia”, Slavic and East European Performance. 25, 2, spring 2005, 80-84.
- Larissa M. L. Onyshkevych. “’White Butterflies, Plaited Chains: A Live Metamorphosis by Theatre-in-a-Basket from Lviv, Ukraine.” Slavic & East European Performance. 26, 1, 2006, 84—90.
- Larissa M. L. Zaleska Onyshkevych. “Echoes of Chornobyl at the LaMama Theater”. The Ukrainian Weekly. Feb. 16, 1992, 10, 18.
- Larissa M. L. Onyshkevych. “The Kurbas Theatre’s Productions of Marusia Churai and Kaminnyi Hospodar [in Lviv]. The Ukrainian Weekly, March 22, 1988, 10,13.
- Larissa M. L. Onyshkevych. “On the Stages of Ukraine in 1990: From Sholom Aleichem to Mykola Kulish.” Slavic and East European Performance, 11, no.1 (1991): 49-57.
- Irena R. Makaryk. About the Harrowing of Hell. A 17th Century Ukrainian Play in its European Context. (Dovehouse, 1989)
