= Maria Sadovska Barilotti =

Ukrainian singer and actress (1855–1891)

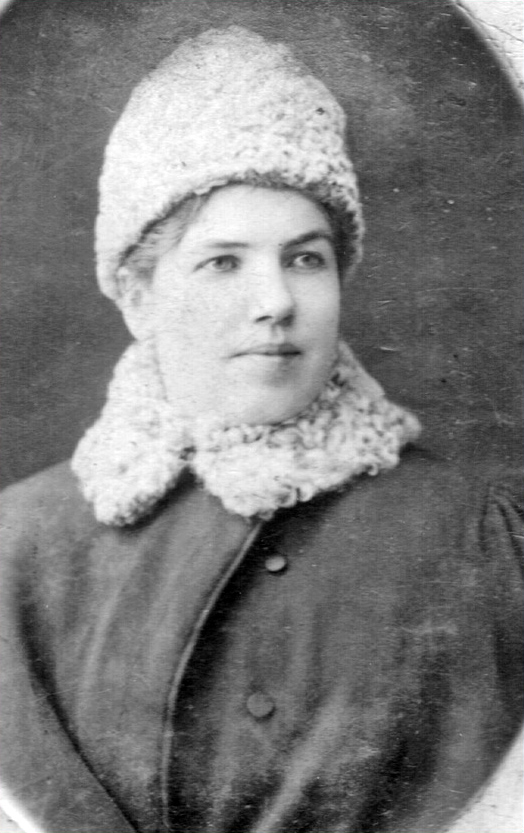
- Born: 1855; Kherson Governorate
- Died: 27 March 1891 (aged 35–36); Odesa

Maria Sadovska Barilotti was a Ukrainian soprano singer and theatre actress.

== Biography ==
Maria born in April 1855 in the village of Kamiano-Kostuvate to the Tobilevych family. She was the sister of Ivan Karpenko-Karyi, Mykola Sadovskyi, and Panas Saksahanskyi.

She began her career in the year 1876 with an operetta troupe. Later, she worked with the groups of Mykhailo Starytskyi from 1883 to 1885 and Marko Kropyvnytskyi from 1885 to 1888. She again worked with the group of Starytskyi from 1890 to 1891.

She died at 36 years of age in the city of Odesa and was buried in Yelyzavethrad .

== Roles ==
Sadovka played Natalka Poltavka in the eponymous production based on the play by Ivan Kotliarevskyi. Her other roles inculed Odarka in Hulak-Artemovskyi's Zaporozhian Beyond the Danube, Pannochka in Lysenko's The Drowned, Marusia in Kropyvnytskyi's Give Freedom to Your Heart..., Sofia and Varka in Karpenko-Karyi's The Unlucky etc.
