= Theatre of Coryphaei =

First professional theatre in Ukraine

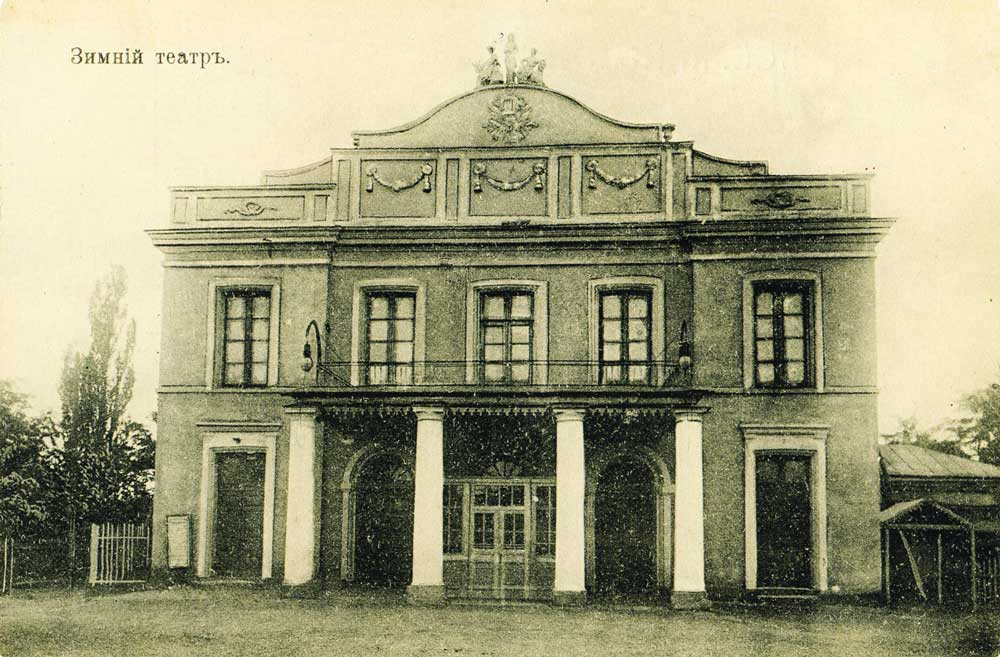
Yelisvetgrad theatre, where the first performance of the "Society of Ukrainian artists under the direction of M. L. Kropyvnytskyi" took place on October 27, 1882. Now it is the Kirovohrad Ukrainian music and drama theatre named after Marko Kropyvnytskyi.

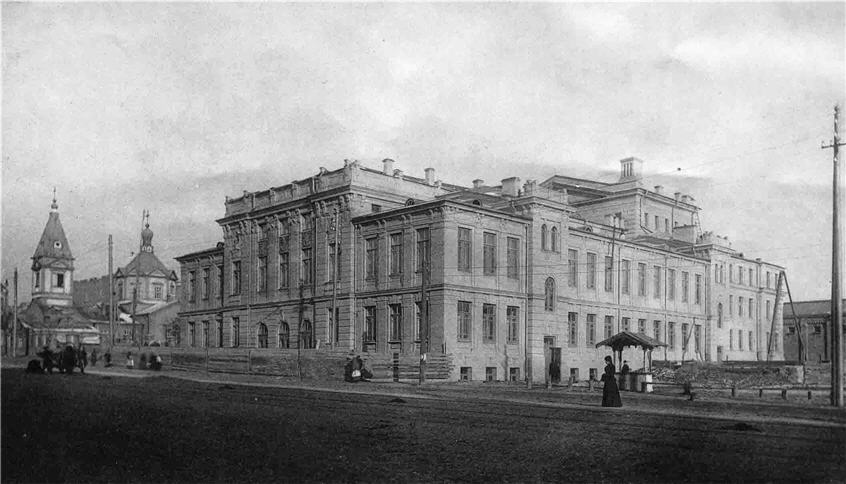
Trinity People's House, where the first Ukrainian stationary theatre operated since 1907. Now it is the Kyiv National Academic Theatre of Operetta.

The Theatre of Coryphaei is a Ukrainian theatre. It is located in the city of Kropyvnytskyi (former Yelizavetgrad ), Ukraine. The theatre was founded by Marko Lukich Kropyvnytskyi in 1882. Thereafter, its most active head was Mykola Karpovich Sadovsky, who promoted the use of Ukrainian language and Ukrainian theatre at a time when both were banned by the Russian empire.

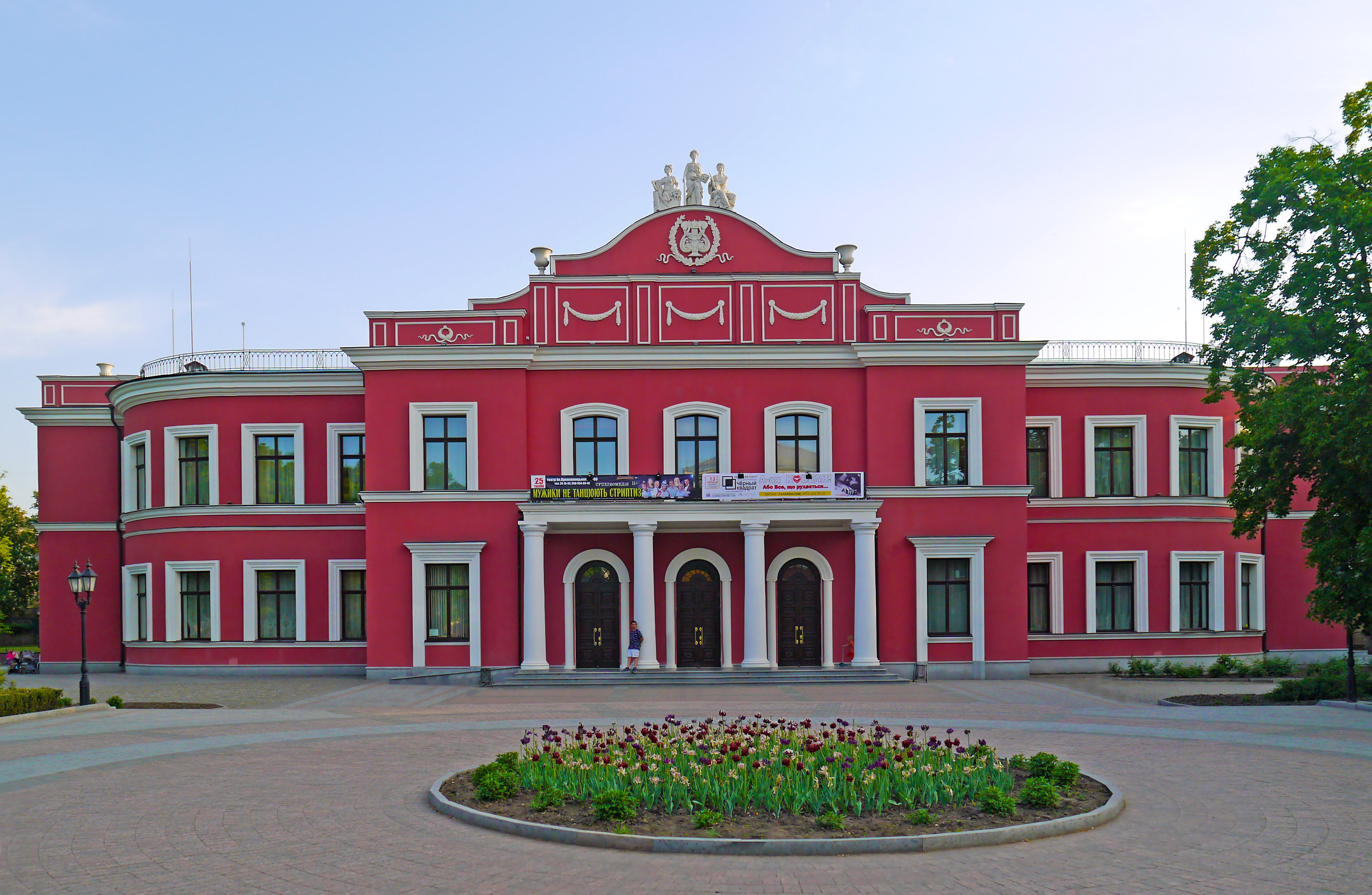
Modern theatre building

Maria Zankovetska and Panas Saksagansky are associated with the theatre. It adopted the style of syncretic theatre, which combined dramatic and comedic action with musical and vocal scenes, including choral and dance ensembles.

== Etymology ==
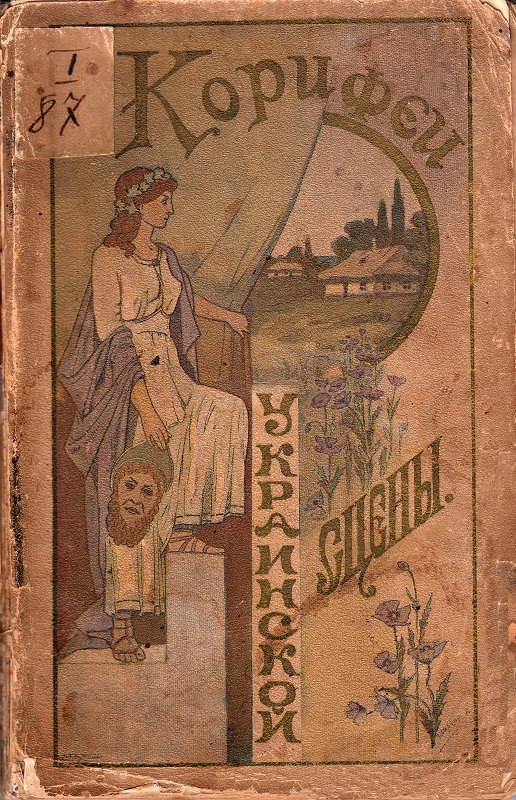
"Coryfaei of the Ukrainian Stage" (Kiev, 1901).

The book "Coryphaei of the Ukrainian Stage" was published in Kyiv in 1901. Due to censorship, it was written anonymously by leading Ukrainian intellectuals. Marko Kropyvnytskyi, Mykhailo Starytsky Ivan Tobilevich and others were first named as part of coryphaei Ukrainian theatre in this book. This somewhat poetic term has become inseparable from the theatre.

== History ==
In 1881, after many years of struggle, Ukrainians were able to stage performances in the Ukrainian language. Although many restrictions remained (for example, before each Ukrainian performance, a Russian one had to take place), this step by the Ministry of Internal Affairs nevertheless legalized Ukrainian theatre.

In 1885, the only theatre troupe at that time split up: Marko Kropyvnytskyi and his actors separated from Mikhailo Starytsky and his supporters. Both groups immediately began independent creative endeavors.

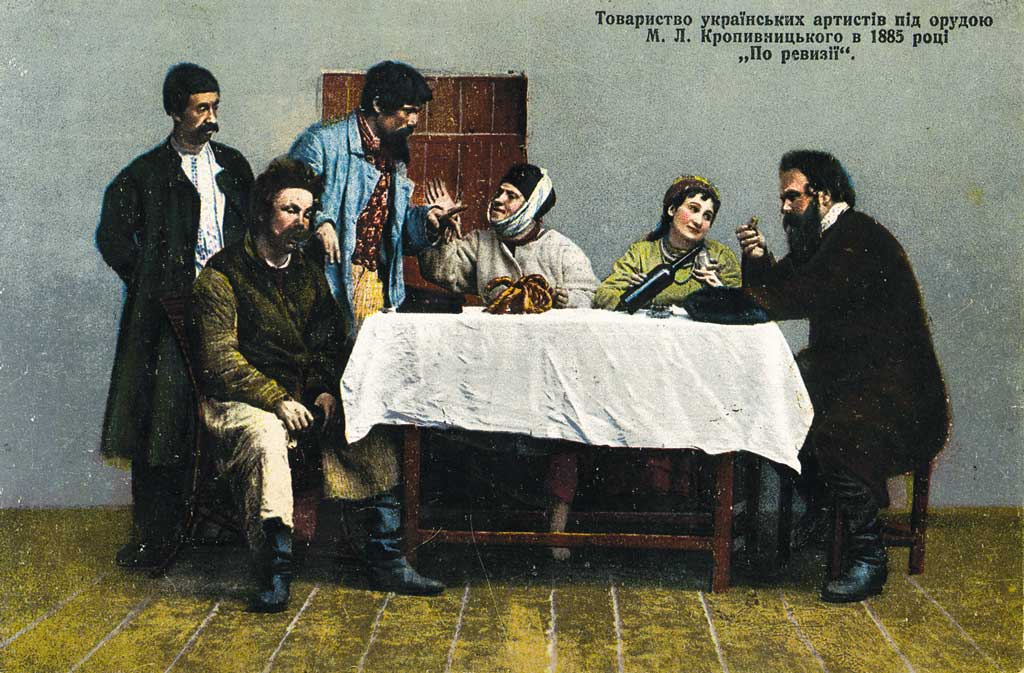
Society of Ukrainian Artists under the direction of M.L. Kropyvnytskyi.

In 1887, they performed in Kazan. The performances were attended by many Poles, who, according to the journalist of the magazine "Kurjer Lwowski," "Shevchenko's speech is more understandable than local Russians."

In 1907, Mikola Karpovich Sadovsky managed to open the first permanent Ukrainian theatre in Kyiv, Sadovsky Theatre.

The theatre's repertoire included performances such as A Zaporozhian beyond the Danube, The Bartered Bride, Gal'ka, Kateryna, and Kotliarevsky's Eneida. Of note was the production of Gogol's The Government Inspector in Ukrainian.

Mykola Sadovsky popularized his theatre, offering an accessible repertoire and ticket prices that were significantly lower than other Kyiv theatres.

Sadovsky Theatre lasted for seven years, until the outbreak of the World War I (1914), when the authorities closed the theatre, all Ukrainian newspapers, magazines, and bookstores.

== Gallery ==
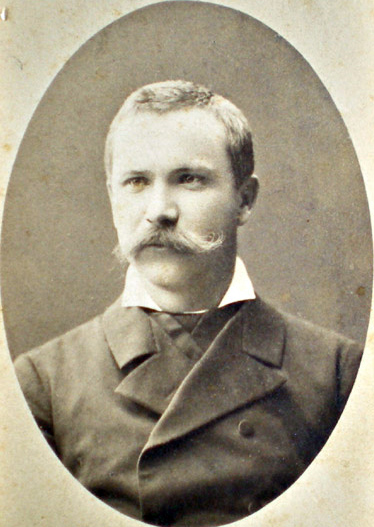
Ivan Karpenko-Karyi

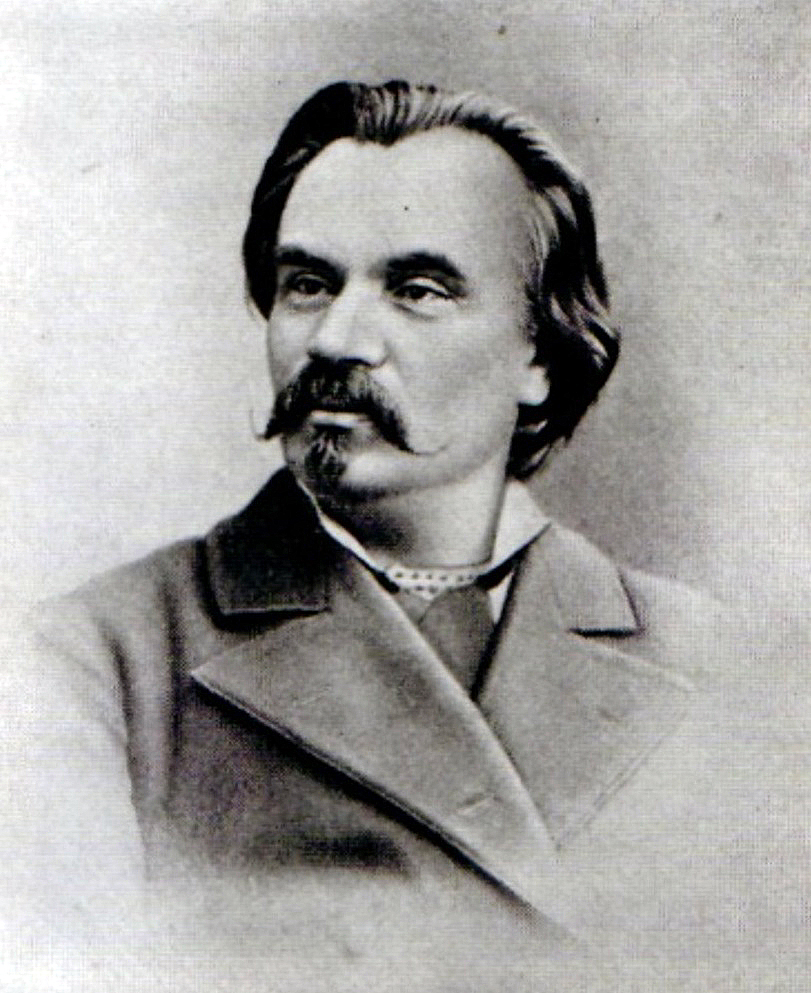
Mykhailo Starytsky

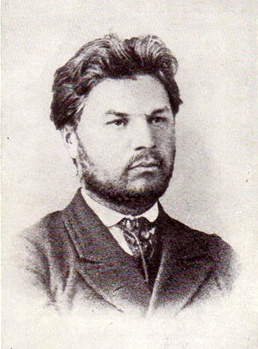
Marko Kropyvnytskyi
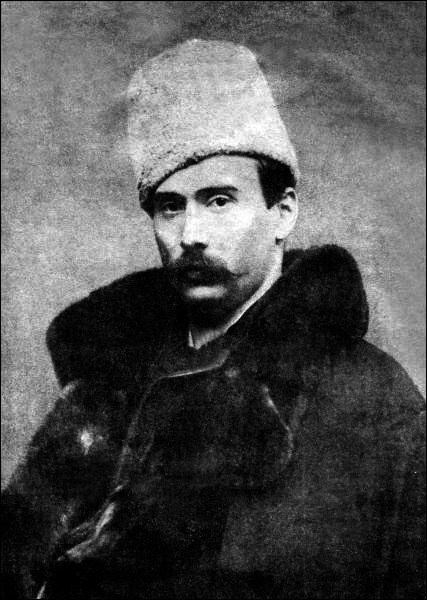
Mykola Sadovsky

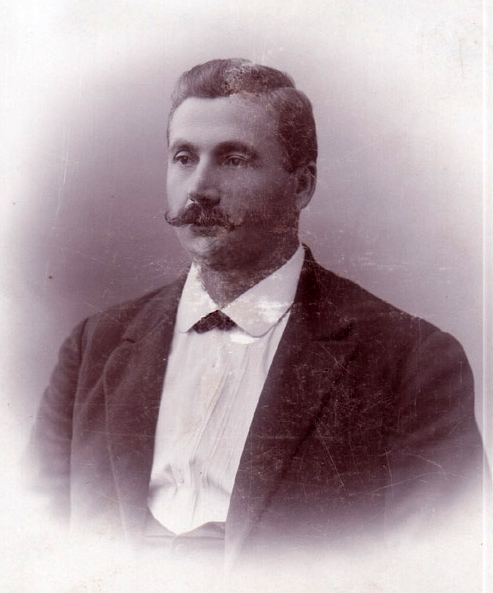
Panas Saksahansky

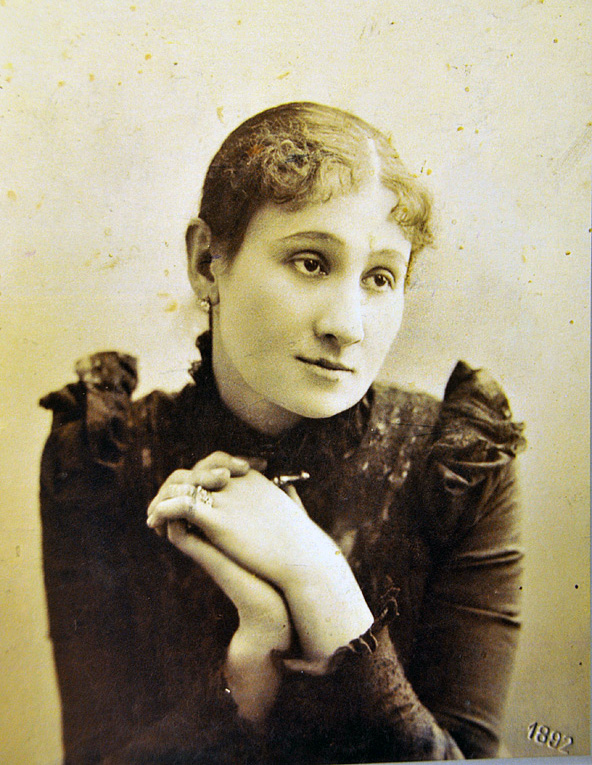
Maria Zankovetska

== See also ==
- Theater in Ukraine
- List of theatres in Ukraine

== Sources ==
- Час корифеїв. 125 років тому було створено перший професійний український театр. Газета «День». № 219, 14 грудня 2007
- Батько українського театру. Газета «День». № 88, 22 травня 2008
- Корифеї українського театру
- «Проект — Єлисаветградський абрис. Персони українського театру.» Фотографії, аудіозаписи, біографії, бібліографії Тобілевичів і Marko Kropyvnytskyi з фондів Меморіальний музей М. Л. Кропивницького|меморіального музею М. Л. Кропивницького.
- «Корифеї українського театру» // Літературознавча енциклопедія : у 2 т. / авт.-уклад. Ю. І. Ковалів. — Київ : ВЦ «Академія», 2007. — Т. 1 : А — Л. — С. 525–526.
