= Maria Hrebinetska =

Ukrainian-American actress and soprano

Maria Zinovievna Hrebinetska
- Марія Зіновіївна Гребінецька
- Born: 1883; Kiev, Russian Empire (now Kyiv, Ukraine)
- Died: August 15, 1972 (aged 88–89); New York, New York
- Occupations: Actress and operatic soprano

Maria Zinovievna Hrebinetska (Note: Ukrainian: Марія Зіновіївна Гребінецька, romanized: Mariia Zinoviivna Hrebinetska) (1883 – 15 August 1972) was a theater actress and operatic soprano. She is known for her performances at the Mykola Sadovsky Theater, Odesa Opera House, and the Ruska Besida Theater in Lviv.

== Early life and education ==
Maria Hrebinetska was born in 1883 in Kyiv. Her parents were teachers of the Ukrainian language and literature, who were financially comfortable and were able to provide their daughter with a good education. Hrebenetska attended a private music school run by M. Lesnevich-Nosova, and from 1905 to 1907, she studied at Mykola Lysenko Music and Drama School under Oleksandr Myszuga. Hrebinetska was considered one of the most outstanding singers at Lysenko School. On the recommendation of Oleksandr Myszuga, Hrebinetska went to Milan to improve her skills and studied singing there from 1907 to 1911.

The singer often took in mind the advice of her great teacher: "To become a singer of world fame, so that everyone would know and say that this is Maria Grebenetska, a Ukrainian who gave up everything to live for art - this is life. And the voice is there, and the musicality is there, and the appropriate appearance, and intelligence, and youth."

Vadym Shcherbakivsky, who had known Maria since her childhood, recalled: "Next to my room was the apartment of the Grebenetsky family, where Miss Maria, who had a good soprano, was studying with Mishuga. It was extremely interesting to hear her sing a duet from Boito's "Mefistofele" with Mikhail Mikisheya, when she came back from school. Their voices sounded as if they were really somewhere far away, but the phenomenon of distance was achieved not by the quietness of the voices, but by their special vibration. The impression was that these voices flew over the sea and distant island mentioned in the song. The voices rolled on as if they were something external, like some zephyr, capable of flying infinitely far."

== Career ==
After graduating in 1911, Hrebinetska became a soloist at the Odesa Opera House, making her debut in the part of Oksana in the opera Zaporozhets za Dunayem by Semen Gulak-Artemovsky. She worked as a soloist at the Odesa Opera House until 1912.

In 1914, Hrebinetska became a soloist of the Mykola Sadovsky Theater in Kyiv where she sang all the soprano parts.

In a letter to Oleksandr Myszuga, Maria wrote about that time, saying, "I am serving at the Sadovsky theater. His affairs are going as well as could not have been imagined. Almost every day the house is full. I sang in 'Zaporozhets za Dunayem', 'Whirlwinds', 'The Drowned Woman', 'Natalka Poltavka', and 'Galtsya'. It was not possible to stage all the operas, as the majority of the troupe, choir, and orchestra were taken to the army. I feel good about my voice, but I would have sung much better if I had worked with you, dear maestro, for a longer period of time."

At that time, while being a great vocalist, Maria did not yet have experience as a dramatic actress. The prominent composer and choir conductor Oleksandr Koshyts recalled, "The work on staging Lysenko's 'Christmas Night' was extremely difficult. The thing is that we had only one true artist-vocalist, tenor Vnukovsky. The rest were either dramatic actors of the troupe or those who received musical education but had not yet been on stage. This included the main heroine Maria Hrebenetska and bass Hr. Pavlovsky. Maria Hrebenetska had a very good, slightly dry soprano, well-trained. So, in this regard, the job was done well. Unfortunately, she had a major flaw - the inability to characterize." However, thanks to the skillful decisions of the directors, the performance was successful.

After the closing of the Sadovs'kyi Theater, she performed with the L'viv Ukrainian Discourse Theater (Театр Української Бесіди), as well as in Uzhhorod and Prague, where she joined the Ukrainian National Chorus under the direction of Oleksandr Koshyts'. She traveled with the Chorus to the United States in 1922 and toured with them until 1924.

In 1922, she joined the Ukrainian National Chorus under the direction of Oleksandr Koshyts'. There, Maria became a chorister for the Ukrainian Republican Choral Chapel under the direction of an outstanding conductor. Hrebinetska traveled with the Chorus to the United States in 1922 and toured with them until 1924. Her brother Mykhailo Hrebinetsky also performed in the Chorus.

From 1923 to 1928, Hrebinetska sang in People's House in New York (1923-1928). In 1931, Hrebinetska joined a violinist Roman Prydatkevych and pianist Alisa Korchak to form the ensemble "Ukrainian Trio" in New York City. She remained the soloist of the ensemble “Ukrainian Trio” until 1934.

In the 1930s, Hrebinetska married Nestor Novovirskyi.

In 1941, she graduated from the Washington Irving Evening High School in New York City with a Gold Medal for Scholarship, awarded annually to the highest ranking student of the graduating class. Thanks to this scholarship she could attend Hunter College, from which she graduated in 1949.

In her youth, Maria Hrebinetska was one of the most prominent Ukrainian singers in North America and over the years she began to act mainly as an accompanist or director. For nearly 20 years, Hrebinetska taught voice and piano in New York City at the Ukrainian National Home and at the studio of the Surma Book and Music Company that she co-founded in 1944.

Maria Hrebinetska died on 15 August 1972 in New York. She died after being struck by a taxi on the way to visit her sick husband in the hospital.

== Legacy ==
Hrebinetska's contributions to Ukrainian cultural life were immeasurable. She facilitated the popularization of Ukrainian music and theater both in Ukraine and the United States, and her work played a crucial role in preserving and promoting Ukrainian cultural heritage during a period of great upheaval.

Hrebinetska's legacy has continued long after her death. Her recordings of Ukrainian folk songs are still highly regarded, and her performances on stage are remembered as some of the greatest in Ukrainian theater history. Nowadays, Hrebinetska appears as a cultural icon and a symbol of Ukrainian identity both in Ukraine and in the United States.

== Roles ==
At the Odesa Opera House

- debut - Oksana's part in the opera Zaporozhets za Dunayem by Semen Gulak-Artemovsky.
- operas "Chernomorets," "Christmas Night," "Natalka Poltavka," "The Drowned Woman," "Aeneid," "Pebbles."

At the Mykola Sadovsky Theater, she sang all soprano parts. Among them:

- Oksana (Zaporozhets za Dunayem by Semen Gulak-Artemovsky )
- Natalka, Oksana ("Natalka Poltavka," "Christmas Night" by M. Lysenko)
- Pebbles ("Pebbles" by S. Monyushka)
- Mazhenka ("The Bartered Bride" by B. Smetana)

In the cinema:

- voiceover artist of the role of Maroussi in the film of the same name by Vasily Avramenko (1938)
