= Coryphaeus =

Leader for a chorus or group

In Attic drama, the coryphaeus, corypheus, or koryphaios (Ancient Greek: κορυφαῖος, romanized: koryphaîos, from κορυφή, koryphḗ́, meaning "the top of the head") was the leader of the chorus. Hence the term (sometimes anglicised as coryphe) is used for the chief or leader of any company or movement. The original Greek coryphaeus spoke for all the chorus, whenever the chorus took part in the action, in quality of a person of the drama, during the course of the acts.

The term is sometimes used for the chief or principal of any company, corporation, sect, opinion, etc. Thus, Eustathius of Antioch is called the coryphaeus of the First Council of Nicaea of AD 325, and Cicero calls Zeno of Citium (c. 334 – c. 262 BC) the coryphaeus of the Stoics.

Apostles Peter and Paul are often entitled "Coryphaeus" in Orthodox Christian iconography.

In 1856 the University of Oxford established the office of Coryphaeus or Praecentor with the duty of leading the musical performances directed by the Choragus. The office ceased to exist in 1899.

Solzhenitsyn's In the First Circle (1968), often refers to Stalin as a "Coryphaeus" ("the Coryphaeus of all the Sciences", for example), meaning that he speaks for all in the Soviet Union.

== In video games ==
Corypheus is an antagonist introduced in the Legacy DLC for Dragon Age II. The same Corypheus returns as the central antagonist and the catalyst to the events of Dragon Age: Inquisition.

== See also ==
- USS Corypheus
- Theatre of Coryphaei
