= Zanky =

Rural locality in Chernihiv Oblast, Ukraine

Zanky Заньки
- Location in Chernihiv Oblast Zanky (Ukraine)
- Coordinates: 51°11′49″N 31°59′2″E
- Country: Ukraine
- Oblast: Chernihiv Oblast
- Raion: Nizhyn Raion
- Hromada: Vertiivka rural hromada
- Time zone: UTC+2 (EET)
  - Summer (DST): UTC+3 (EEST)
- Postal code: 16623

Zanky (Ukrainian: Заньки) is a village in the Vertiivka rural hromada of the Nizhyn Raion of Chernihiv Oblast in Ukraine.

The village has a memorial museum in honor of Mariia Zankovetska.

== History ==
The village was founded in the middle of the 14th century.

On 19 July 2020, as a result of the administrative-territorial reform and liquidation of the Nizhyn Raion, the village became part of the Nizhyn Raion.

== Notable residents ==
- Maria Zankovetska (Mariia Zankovetska; 1854–1934), Ukrainian theater actress
