= Mykola Sadovskyi =

Ukrainian theatre actor

- Микола Садовський
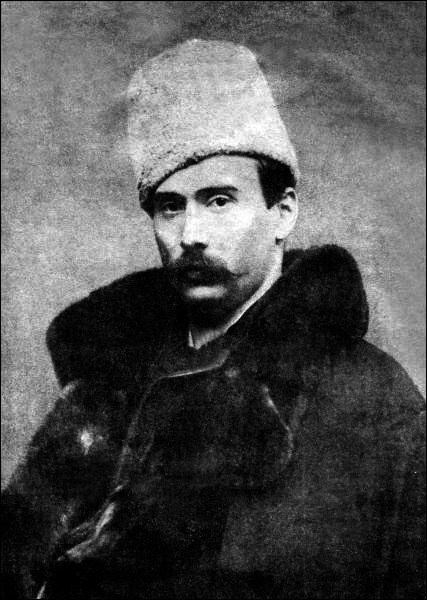
- Sadovskyi in the late 1880s
- Born: Микола Карпович Тобілевич; December 13, 1856; Kamyano-Kostuvate, Elisavetgrad uezd, Kherson Governorate, Russian Empire
- Died: 7 February 1933 (aged 76); Kyiv, Ukrainian SSR, Soviet Union

Signature
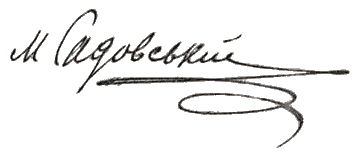

Mykola Sadovskyi (Ukrainian: Микола Садовський), real name Mykola Karpovych Tobilevych (Ukrainian: Микола Карпович Тобілевич; 13 December 1856–7 February 1933) was a Ukrainian actor who established the first stationary Ukrainian theatre.

== Biography ==
=== Early life ===
Mykola Tobilevych was born in the village of Kamyano-Kostuvate, Kherson Governorate. A member of the Tobilevych family, he was the brother of Ivan Karpenko-Karyi, Maria Sadovska Barilotti, and Panas Saksahanskyi. After graduating from a Realschule in Yelysavethrad, Mykola started playing in amateur theatrical troupes. In 1881 he debuted in professional theatre as member of the troupe led by H. Ashkarenko, Marko Kropyvnytskyi and Mykhailo Starytskyi. In 1888 Sadovskyi organized his own troupe, which ten years later merged with the company of Kyrpenko-Karyi and Saksahanskyi, and in 1900 united with the troupe of Kropyvnytskyi. In 1905 Sadovskyi was invited to managed the Ruska Besida Theatre in Lviv. During his stay in Galicia, he, along with Maria Zankovetska, greatly contributed to the development of theatrical art in Western Ukraine.

After returning to Kyiv, Sadovskyi organized the first permanent Ukrainian theatre, which started its activities in Poltava in 1906 and remained active until 1919. Under the Ukrainian People's Republic he worked as an official in charge of popular theatres. In 1920 Sadovskyi moved to Galicia, and one year later to Transcarpathia, where he headed the Prosvita theatre in Uzhhorod. In 1923 he settled in Prague, but in 1926 returned to Soviet Ukraine. Unable to continue his own theatrical business in circumstances of Communist rule, he worked in different theatres and played in several films. He died on 7 February 1933 in Kyiv. Sadovskyi's memoirs were posthumously published in 1956.

=== Work ===
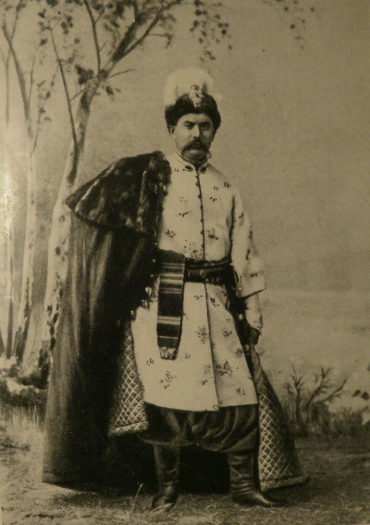
Sadovskyi in the role of Bohdan Khemlnytskyi

As an actor, Sadovskyi was known for his plasticity, authenticity of character, wide range of emotions, deepness and sincerity of feelings. Some of his roles include Bohdan Khmelnytskyi (in M. Starytskyi's play of the same name), Sava Chalyi (I. Karpenko-Karyi), Hetman Doroshenko (L. Starytska-Cherniakhivska), Dmytro (It Was Not Destined by M. Starytskyi), Opanas (The Vagabond by I. Karpenko-Karyi). He also played roles in Lesya Ukrainka's The Stone Host and Gogol's The Government Inspector. Additionally, Sadovskyi was known for his performances of Ukrainian folk songs.

Sadovskyi also translated literary works and librettos by Gogol, Moniuszko and Smetana. Many of his pupils became prominent Ukrainian actors. Together with figures such as Mykola Lysenko, Liumyla Starytska-Cherniakhivska and Vasyl Krychevsky he contributed to the emergence of a new generation of Ukrainian intelligentsia.
