= Fomka the Fool =

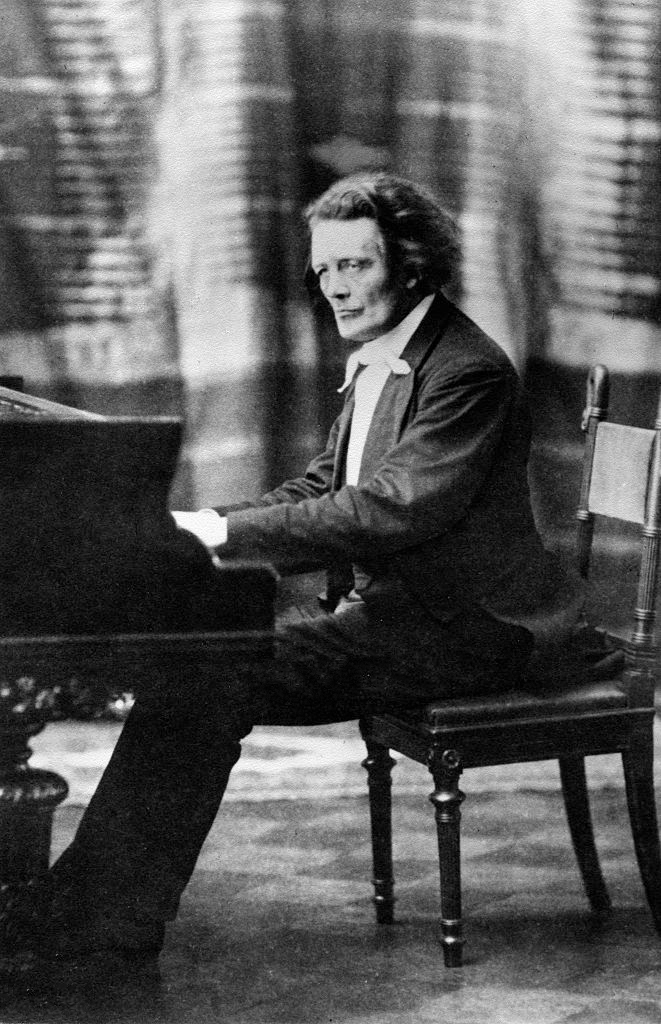
Rubinstein at the piano

Fomka the Fool (Fomka-durachok: Russian: Фомка-дурачок) is a one-act opera by Anton Rubinstein to a libretto by M. L. Mikhaylov. It was given its only performance in 1853.

== Background ==
Fomka was the second of Rubinstein's operas to be performed. It was commissioned, together with two other one-act operas, The Siberian Hunters and Vengeance, by the Grand Duchess Yelena Pavlovna. The first performance was on 12 May [O.S. 30 April] 1853 at the Alexandrinsky Theatre in St. Petersburg. The title role was sung by Lev Leonov, the son of the pianist John Field.

The performance appears to have been a disaster. The composer wrote 'It was performed in such a way that I gathered everything up and do not intend to give any more of my works on the Russian stage [...] [The performers] missed out whole bars, came in early, forgot their parts [..]' Rubinstein went to the theatre office the next day and insisted that his score be returned to him. The failure was an incentive for Rubinstein to quit Russia to seek a career in Western Europe. Although Rubinstein offered the opera to Franz Liszt to be performed in Weimar in 1854, the score now appears to be lost.

== Roles ==
Role	Voice type	Premiere Cast, 12 May [O.S. 30 April] 1853 (Conductor: )
Miron, the village starosta		Zhivov
Anyushka, his daughter	soprano	Emilia Lileyeva
Fyodor, her fiancé		Pavel Bulakhov
Fomka the Fool	tenor	Lev Leonov
Panteley	baritone	Semen Hulak-Artemovsky
Stepanova, a matchmaker	soprano	Marya Leonova
