= Semen Hulak-Artemovsky =

Imperial Russian composer, singer, and writer (1813–1873)

Semen Stepanovych Hulak-Artemovsky
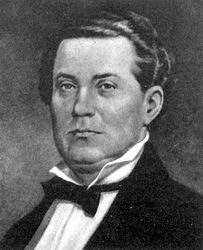
- .
- Born: 16 February [O.S. 4 February] 1813; Gorodishche, Kiev Governorate, Russian Empire
- Died: April 17, 1873 (aged 60); Moscow, Moscow Governorate, Russian Empire
- Burial place: Vagankovo Cemetery, Moscow
- Other names: Semyon Gulak-Artemovsky, Semyon Artemovs’kyj
- Occupations: Composer; actor; singer; dramatist
- Known for: Zaporozhets za Dunayem
- Relatives: Petro Hulak-Artemovsky (uncle)

Semen Stepanovych Hulak-Artemovsky (Ukrainian: Семен Степанович Гулак-Артемовський, also referred to as Semyon Gulak-Artemovsky and Artemovs’kyj) (16 February [O.S. 4 February] 1813 – 17 April [O.S. 5 April] 1873), was an opera composer, baritone, actor, dramatist and pioneer of Ukrainian theatre who worked in Imperial Russia.

He is known mainly for his comic opera Zaporozhets za Dunayem ('A Zaporozhian Beyond the Danube'), as well as for his dramatic talent and his powerful, rich baritone voice. He was the nephew of the poet Petro Hulak-Artemovsky and a close friend of the Ukrainian poet and artist Taras Shevchenko.

== Biography ==
Semen Stepanovych Hulak-Artemovsky was born in Gorodishche, Kiev Governorate (today part of Ukraine), the son of a priest. He studied at the Kyiv Theological Seminary from 1835 to 1838. In 1838, at the age of 25, having gained the attention of the Russian composer Mikhail Glinka, Hulak-Artemovsky was brought to the capital St Petersburg. There he received vocal training from Glinka, and entry into the Imperial Chapel Choir. The following year, Hulak-Artemovsky left St Petersburg to continue his studies in Italy. In 1841, towards the end of his stay, he began performing opera in Florence. Upon his return to St. Petersburg the following year, Hulak-Artemovsky became a soloist of the Imperial Opera at the Imperial Bolshoi Kamenny Theatre, a position he held for 22 years. In 1852 and 1853 he sang roles in Anton Rubinstein's first two operas, Dmitry Donskoy and Fomka the Fool.

Hulak-Artemovsky performed at the Bolshoi Theatre in Moscow from 1864 to 1865. He performed over fifty operatic roles during his career, including Ruslan in Glinka's Ruslan and Lyudmila, Masetto in Mozart's Don Giovanni, as well as Antonio and Lord Ashton in Donizetti's Linda di Chamounix and Lucia di Lammermoor.

A composer of operas, as well as vocal and instrumental music, Hulak-Artemovsky composed his seminal work Zaporozhets za Dunayem in 1864, after completing the libretto in 1862.

His friendship with Taras Shevchenko began in the fall of 1838, after a chance meeting in St. Petersburg. The lifelong friendship continued during Shevchenko's incarceration and subsequent release, and was said to have strongly influenced Hulak-Artemovsky's view of the world. He dedicated his song A Maple Tree Stands Over The River (Ukrainian: Стоїть явір над вoдoю, translit. Stoyit' yavir nad vodoyu) to Shevchenko.

Hulak-Artemovsky died at the age of 60 in Moscow. He was buried in the Vagankovo Cemetery in Moscow.

== Works ==
- the vaudeville A picture of the Gypsies' life on the steppe (Картина степового життя циган)
- the divertissement Ukrainian Wedding (Українcькe Beciлля, 1851) Hulak-Artemovsky sang the role of the father-in-law in the premiere.
- the vaudeville night on St. John's Eve (Hiч на Iвaна Kyпaлa, 1852)
- music for the theatrical play Destroyer of ships (Руйнівники кораблів, 1853)
- Zaporozhets za Dunayem (Запорожець за Дунаєм), translated as A Zaporozhian Beyond the Danube, also referred to as Cossacks in Exile. (26 April [O.S. 14 April] 1863, St. Petersburg). Hulak-Artemovsky sang the role of Karas' in the premiere.
- Songs:
- the collection of 7 songs Ukrainian Wedding (Українська свадьба), including the choir Come on, quickly, come on, swiftly, musicians, play on (Нуте швидко, нуте прудко, музики, заграйте)
- I don't want to sleep (Спать мені не хочеться)
- A Maple Tree Stands Over The River (Стоїть явір над вoдoю), dedicated to Taras Shevchenko

== Sources ==
- Kaufman, Leonid Serhiĭovych (1973). С.С. Гулак-Артемовский: Жизнь. Личность. Творчество [S.S. Gulak-Artemovsky Life. Personality. Creativity] (in Russian). Moscow, Russia: Music.
- Shevchuk, V.O. (1984). Antolohii︠a︡ ukraïnsʹkoï poeziï v shesty tomakh: Ukraïnsʹka doz︠h︡ovtneva poezii︠a︡ [Anthology of Ukrainian Poetry in 6 Volumes] (in Ukrainian). Kyiv, Ukraine: Vyd-vo khudoz︠h︡.
