= Kropyvnytske =

Rural locality in Kirovohrad Oblast, Ukraine

Kropyvnytske Кропивницьке
- Location in Ukraine Kropyvnytske (Ukraine)
- Coordinates: 48°8′53″N 31°44′56″E
- Country: Ukraine
- Oblast: Kirovohrad Oblast
- Raion: Novoukrainka Raion
- Hromada: Hannivka rural hromada

Population (2001)
  - Total: 937
- Time zone: UTC+2 (EET)
  - Summer (DST): UTC+3 (EEST)

Kropyvnytske (Ukrainian: Кропивницьке) is a village located in Novoukrainka Raion, Kirovohrad Oblast, Ukraine. It is the birthplace of Marko Kropyvnytskyi in whom the village is named for. Kropyvnytske belongs to Hannivka rural hromada, one of the hromadas of Ukraine.
