= Panas Saksahansky =

Ukrainian theatre actor, playwright and translator (1859–1940)

People's Artist Panas Saksahansky
- Панас Карпович Саксаганський
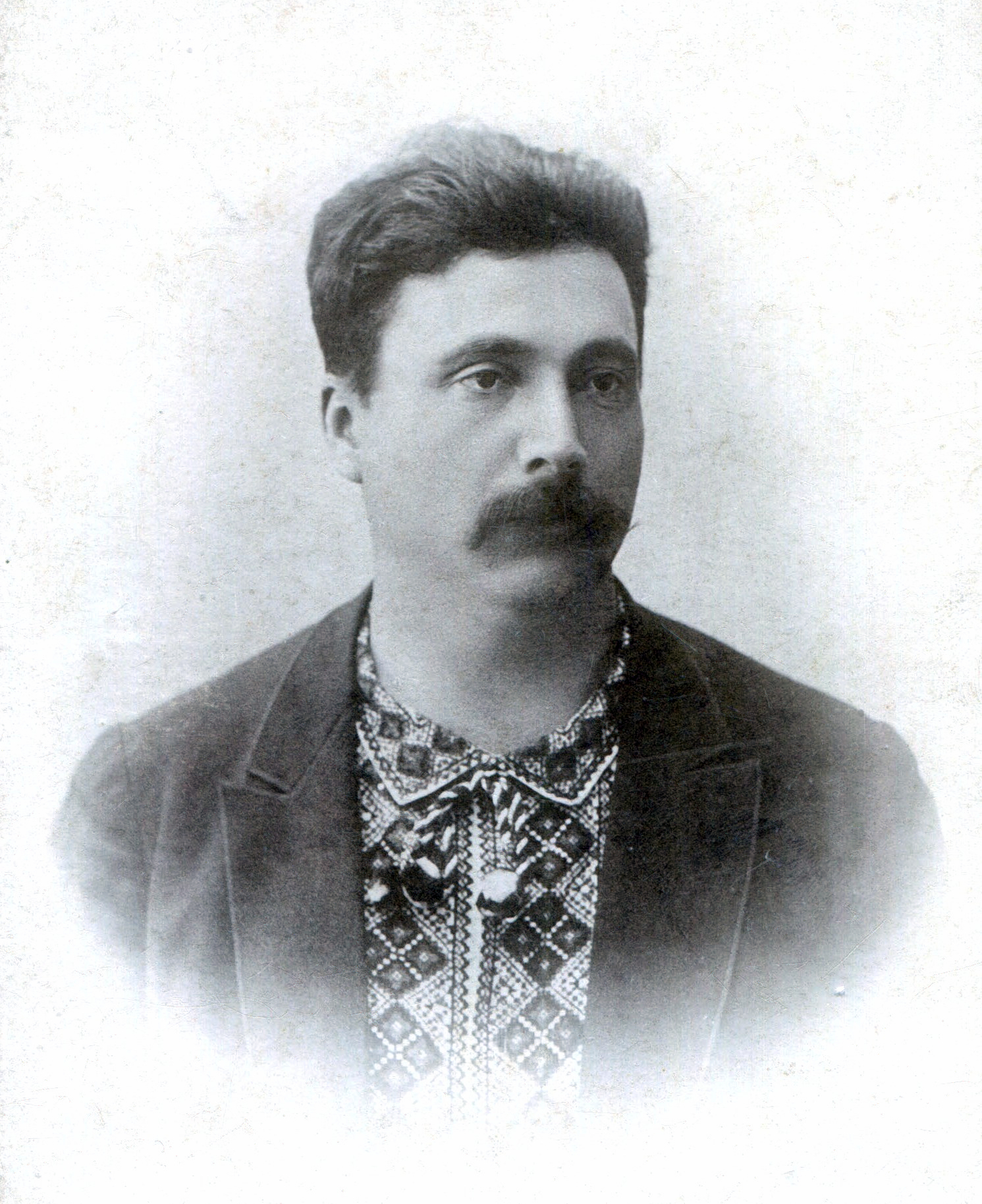
- Saksahansky in the 1890s
- Born: Panas Karpovych Tobilevych; 15 May 1859; Kamiano-Kostuvate, Russian Empire
- Died: 17 September 1940 (aged 81); Kyiv, Ukrainian SSR, Soviet Union
- Resting place: Baikove Cemetery
- Occupations: Actor; playwright; translator
- Spouse: Nina Levchenko (before 1940)
- Writing career
- Language: Ukrainian
- Genres: Comedy (as an actor); Realism (as a director)
- Notable works: The Robbers (1918), Othello (1926)
- Notable awards: People's Artist of Ukraine (1925); People's Artist of the USSR (1936)

Panas Karpovych Tobilevych (Note: Ukrainian: Панас Карпович Тобілевич, pronounced [pɐˈnas ˈkarpɔʋetʃ tɔbʲiˈlɛʋetʃ]. In this name that follows East Slavic naming customs, the patronymic is Karpovych and the family name is Tobilevych.) (15 May [O.S. 3 May] 1859 – 17 September 1940), better known by the pseudonym of Panas Saksahansky, (Note: Ukrainian: Панас Саксаганський, romanized: Panas Saksahanskyi, pronounced [pɐˈnas sɐksɐˈɦanʲsʲkei̯].) was a Ukrainian theatre actor, playwright and translator. The youngest member of the Tobilevych family of actors, Saksahansky was best known as a character actor in comedies, though he later became a playwright and theatre manager. He was a proponent of realism, and his translation of William Shakespeare's Othello (1926) served as the basis for performances of Shakespeare's works in Ukraine under the Soviet Union and the Soviet Union as a whole, though it was later lost.

Born to a family of szlachta which had become commoners following the 1830–1831 November Uprising, Tobilevych served in the Russian military during the 1877–1878 Russo-Turkish War, and witnessed performances by Ernst von Possart and Mykhailo Starytsky's troupe, shaping his views towards theatre and leading him to leave the military. He became an actor in the Theatre of Coryphaei troupe, taking on the pseudonym of Saksahansky after his mother's birth village. Following the Russian Revolution, Saksahansky became a director, working under both the Ukrainian State and the Soviet Union. As a director, Saksahansky's translations were well-received by the Soviet authorities, and he was provided the titles of People's Artist of Ukraine (1925) and People's Artist of the USSR (1936). Saksahansky was a supporter of Soviet leader Joseph Stalin, and celebrated by the Soviet government both prior to and upon his death in 1940 at the age of 81.

== Family and early life ==
Panas Karpovych Tobilevych was born on 15 May 1859 (3 May according to the Julian calendar in place at the time) in the village of Kamiano-Kostuvate, in what was then the Russian Empire and is now southern Ukraine. A member of the Tobilevych family of szlachta, Panas was the youngest of Karpo Tobilevych's six children, among whom would later be contemporary Ukrainian actors Maria Sadovska Barilotti, Ivan Karpenko-Karyi and Mykola Sadovskyi. Following the 1830–1831 November Uprising, the Russian government mandated that all szlachta families provide evidence of their noble origin. As Karpo Tobilevych had no such documents, the family was stripped of their status and became commoners.

Panas's mother was Yevdokiia Sadovska, a serf of Cossack noble descent from the village of Saksahan in Yekaterinoslav Governorate (now Dnipropetrovsk Oblast). Karpo Tobilevych purchased Sadovska from the Zolotonytskyi family of nobles, which owned her, and moved with her to Mala Vyska, where Tobilevych worked under a local landlord. As a serf, Sadovska attended theatrical performances with her master, and, possessing eidetic memory, later retold these stories to her children, leading to the children of the Tobilevych family becoming interested in theatre.

Panas studied at Yelisavetgrad real school (now in Kropyvnytskyi), a vocational school where classical literature was not studied. As students, Panas and Mykola were acquainted with classmate Oleksandr Tarkovskyi, who was involved in a local Ukrainian revolutionary organisation. Panas joined Tarkovskyi as a member of the group, and was influenced by Tarkovskyi's revolutionary nationalist activities, as well as the theatrical activities of his brother Ivan, playwright Marko Kropyvnytskyi and actress Maria Zankovetska. Following his graduation from the real school, Panas studied at the Odesa Junkers' School from 1878 to 1880, during which time the 1877–1878 Russo-Turkish War was occurring.

== Military service, exposure to Possart and Starytsky ==
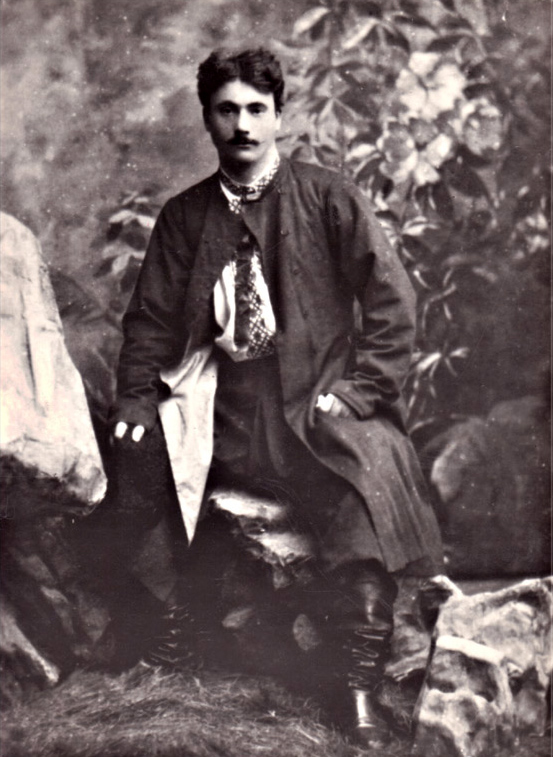
Tobilevych in 1883

During the Russo-Turkish War, Tobilevych served in the 58th Marine Regiment, based in Mykolaiv. The beginning of the war coincided with the promulgation of the Ems Ukaz, which banned the publication of works in the Ukrainian language. (Note: Referred to by the Russian government as the "Little Russian dialect".) During his military service, Tobilevych met Mikhail Ashenbrenner, leader of the Military Organisation of Narodnaya Volya, a revolutionary socialist political group. Ashenbrenner convinced Tobilevych to join Narodnaya Volya, and the latter began reading texts which were illegal under Russian law.

While the works Tobilevych read included those with revolutionary themes, he was largely attracted to theatrical works, such as those of Plutarch, Johann Wolfgang von Goethe, Raffaello Giovagnoli and Homer. While a member of Narodnaya Volya, Tobilevych also attended concerts and theatre performances, particularly a series of five productions by German actor Ernst von Possart, which had a formative role in Saksahanskyi's views towards theatre as an art. Possart, a conservative opposed to modernist theatre, opposed the construction of the Schauspielhaus in Munich and saw modernism as a stain on theatre as an art. These views influenced Tobilevych's own, and he later wrote a satire titled Hypocrites (Ukrainian: Лицеміри, romanized: Lytsemiry) in 1910, critiquing modernism. Possart's performances of King Lear and Othello were also a critical juncture for Tobilevych, and he later described these productions as the moment he felt that he should pursue a career in acting.

In the summer of 1883, Ashenbrenner and other members of Tobilevych's regiment were arrested for their membership in Narodnaya Volya, though Tobilevych himself avoided imprisonment. In August of that year, Tobilevych found further influence to become an actor upon witnessing the plays of Mykhailo Starytsky, in which Marko Kropyvnytskyi, Maria Zankovetska and Tobilevych's brother Mykola were actors. After speaking with Starytsky, Tobilevych felt that he was unfit to manage his troupe, but nonetheless was enamoured by the troupe's plays. After watching Tobilevych's troupe perform, Tobilevych had a nervous breakdown, believing that his time spent in the military was worthless. The regimental commander, believing him to be faking his breakdown, had him sent to an infirmary. Tobilevych was insulted by the perceived slight and resigned from the military in November.

Tobilevych first started acting in Starytsky's troupe, playing Voznyi in an 1883 performance of Ivan Kotliarevsky's Natalka Poltavka. He assumed the pseudonym Saksahansky at some time prior to 1890. As an actor, Saksahansky most frequently appeared in comedies and historical theatre, in the latter case most frequently in plays by his eldest brother Ivan. Saksahansky possessed a baritone voice, which he often used in singing Ukrainian folk music, and he had a talent for mimicry, which he often used in comedic roles. During his career, Saksahansky was recognised as a character actor for his performances in comedies, which were his most famous. Saksahansky's comedic impact came from his impressions and usage of comic timing, which he particularly excelled at. Saksahansky's performances were known to captivate audiences; in one instance, writer Maksym Rylsky said of Saksahansky, "Where is the acting? This is life," while leftist drama critic Yakiv Mamontiv remarked that even critics who viewed ethnically-based and non-modernist theatre negatively were fond of Saksahansky.

== Theatre of Coryphaei and troupe leadership ==
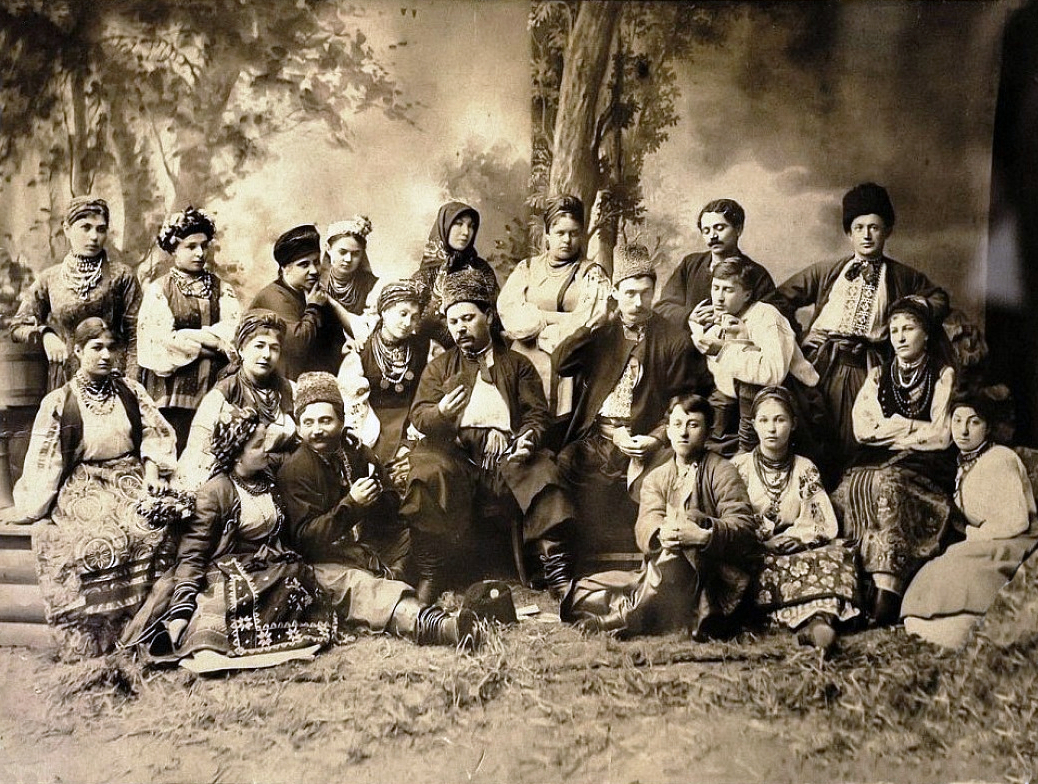
Saksahansky (second from left in the front row) at the Theatre of Coryphaei, c. 1885–1888

Saksahansky joined the Theatre of Coryphaei, run by Kropyvnytskyi as a successor to Starytsky's troupe, upon its formation in 1885. Kropyvnytskyi's leadership caused a schism, with those who viewed Kropyvnytskyi's leadership as autocratic leaving the troupe. Saksahansky was among Kropyvnytskyi's closest supporters at the theatre, affectionately calling him "old cachalot", but privately admitted that Kropyvnytskyi's uncompromising nature and tendency to threaten resigning from the troupe were unfitting of a director. Saksahansky was the youngest member of the Theatre of Coryphaei, and would be its last living member; the troupe's formation, which resulted in the rapid expansion of Ukrainian theatre over the next decade, is compared to the Irish Literary Revival by Irene Rima Makaryk in terms of its impact on Ukrainian theatre.

In the explosion of Ukrainian theatre that followed the Theatre of Coryphaei's founding, other actors chose to establish their own troupes, and Saksahansky was no exception. He first joined his brother Mykola's troupe in 1888 before founding his own in 1890. Known as the Society of Russian and Little Russian Artists, Saksahansky's troupe operated throughout the western Russian Empire, including in Moscow, Saint Petersburg, Warsaw, Minsk, Smolensk, in Bessarabia, the Don, the Kuban and along the Volga, as well as in various parts of Russian Ukraine. In this endeavour, he was joined by Ivan. The troupe originally sought to be organised in a democratic fashion, rejecting Kropyvnytskyi's leadership style. However, power in the troupe quickly became centralised in the hands of Saksahanky and Karpenko-Karyi, who controlled all organisational and financial affairs relating to the Society. The Society, which had sought to unite Kropyvnytskyi and Sadovskyi's troupes, as well as the troupe of Maria Zankovetska, under a shared organisation, saw its membership dwindle, as Kropyvnytskyi and Zankovetska left in 1903, followed by Sadovskyi in 1905. After Karpenko-Karyi's death in 1907, Saksahansky continued to work in the troupe for two years before leaving in 1909.

== Translations of Schiller and Shakespeare ==
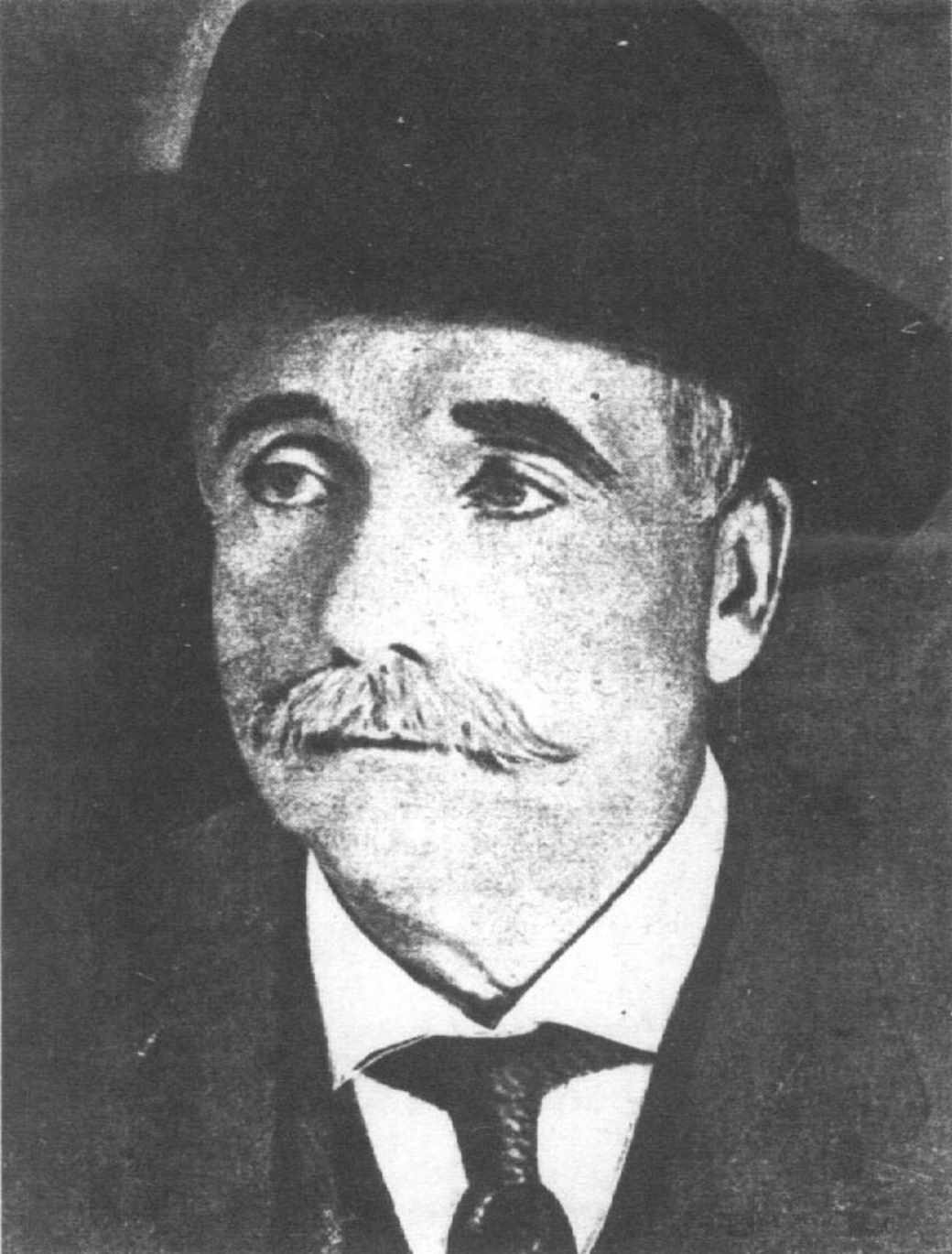
Saksahansky in 1926

The Russian Revolution led to Ukraine's independence from Russia and the abolition of the Ems Ukaz. This enabled Ukrainian playwrights working outside of Austrian-ruled Galicia to perform their works (or Ukrainian translations of foreign works) legally for the first time since the Ems Ukaz had been enacted. In Saksahansky's case, this was marked by a performance of Friedrich Schiller's The Robbers in Kyiv, in 1918. Saksahansky sought to avoid modernist themes in his work that were common during the revolution, and The Robbers, as a melodrama with a good ending, was a welcome form of escapism from the horrors of the revolution, the Ukrainian War of Independence and World War I. Nonetheless, in choosing to translate The Robbers Saksahansky was influenced by the contemporary events of Ukraine's independence and the revolution, as well as part of a desire to increase productions of Western European plays in Ukraine. In his translation of The Robbers Saksahansky cut substantial portions of the text, largely relating to protagonist Karl von Moor acting in immoral ways. In doing so, Saksahansky simplified the story. Later Soviet critics interpreted it as an emphasising of the play's revolutionary ideas of equality, freedom and anti-authoritarianism, but Makaryk instead assesses it as a pessimistic condemnation of Ukrainian society during the revolution.

Following the 1918 Ukrainian coup d'état, the Ukrainian State established the People's State Theatre, a state-owned theatre company, with Saksahansky as director. The law establishing the People's State Theatre mandated the performance of boulevard, historical and classical theatre, in line with what the government believed to be Saksahansky's best works. As director of the theatre, Saksahansky found himself having little time for acting, and he refocused on his works as a director. The People's State Theatre was abolished in 1922 following the Soviet Union's conquest of Ukraine, and Maria Zankovetska Theatre (based in Yekaterinoslav, later known as Dnipropetrovsk and now Dnipro) was established in its place. Saksahansky would continue working at the theatre intermittently thereafter.

Beginning in 1920, Saksahansky gave lectures to directors regarding his views on theatre. In these lectures, Saksahansky argued for boulevard theatre, stating his view that all art should serve as depictions of life and arguing against complex plots. A monograph containing the contents of Saksahansky's lectures was published by Dniprosoyuz in 1920, titled "My Work on a Role" (Ukrainian: Моя работа на ролю, romanized: Moia rabota na roliu), (Note: Title also sometimes given as "How I Work on a Role" (Ukrainian: Як я працюю над роллю, romanized: Yak ya pratsiuiu nad rolliu).) in which he again called for naturalism and boulevard theatre as the basis of drama.

=== Othello (1926) ===
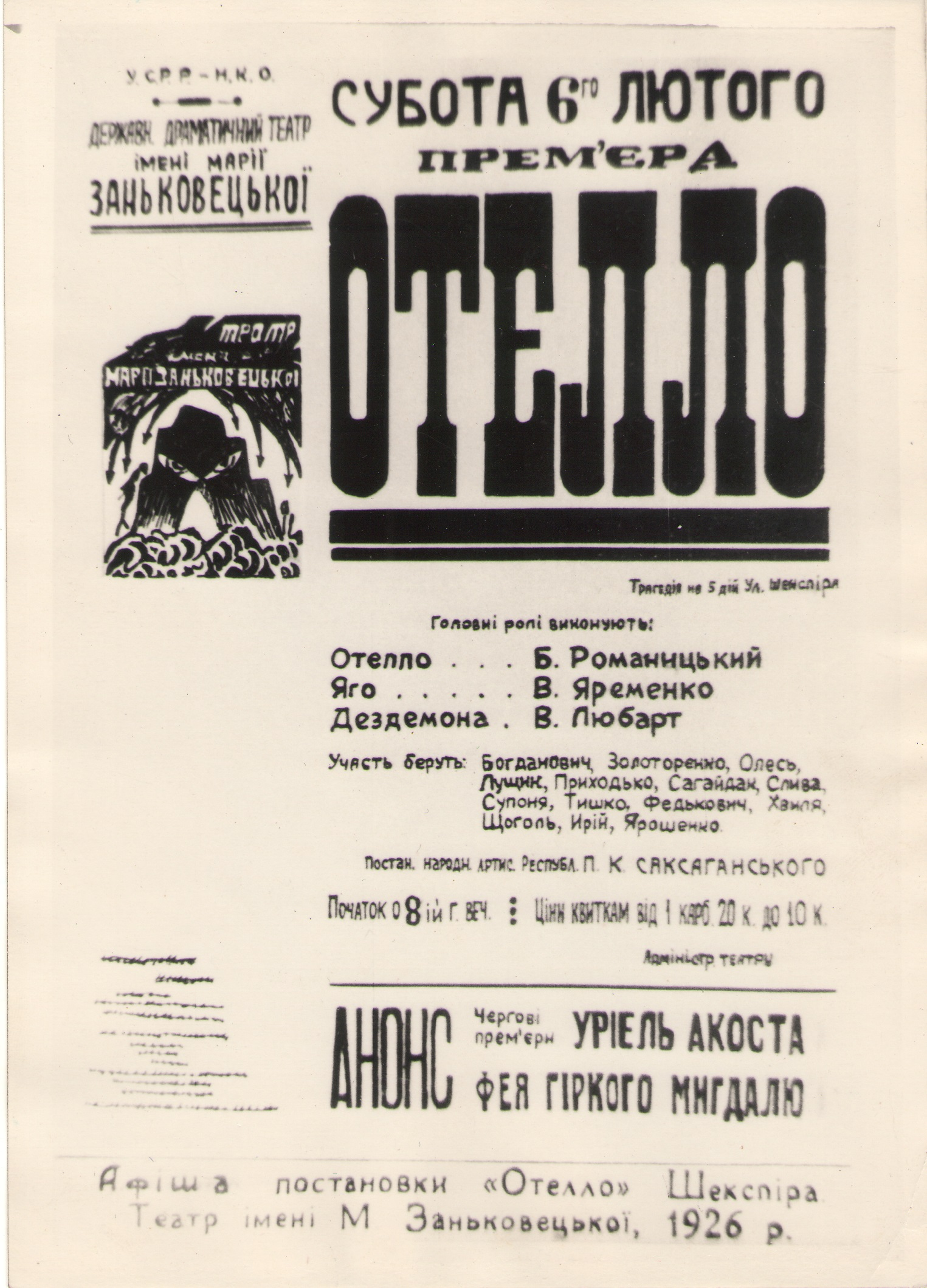
A poster for the premiere of Saksahansky's Othello

The works of Saksahansky and other playwrights, who primarily worked in boulevard theatre focusing on rural Ukrainian life, were strongly condemned by a group of emergent modernist playwrights (led by Les Kurbas) beginning in the 1920s. The modernists regarded Ukrainian boulevard theatre as emphasising a colonial view of Ukraine, in contrast to their own self-perception as encouraging critical thinking and development of a progressive and modern Ukrainian community. In response to the modernists, namely Kurbas's 1924 avant-garde production of William Shakespeare's Macbeth (the first adaptation of Shakespeare to be performed in Ukraine), Saksahansky oversaw a production of Othello in 1926. Saksahansky's Othello was a historical constume drama and a romance, seeking to depict a realist take on the play.

Saksahansky, in contrast to the modernist view of theatre as revolving around the story and action, saw actors' individual performances as the most important part of a play. Borys Romanytskyi, a student of Saksahansky and Othello's actor, deliberately sought to create an image of Othello as a sympathetic character. Dramatist Yevhen Krotevych notes that Saksahansky was well-positioned to translate Shakespeare due to his intricate knowledge of the author's works; Saksahansky had written the entire translation of Othello himself, based on the Russian translation, and had memorised several monologues from Shakespeare's works.

Othello premiered on 6 February 1926 in Yekaterinoslav. Saksahansky did not attend the premiere, possibly due to illness, and he was uninformed of its positive reception. As a result, he believed that the performance had been a disaster. In fact, however, it proved to be his largest success, with a full theatre hall and an excited audience. Later performances, in small cities such as Kherson and Vinnytsia, continued to draw large crowds and very positive reviews. Particular attention centred on the performances of Romanytsky as Othello and Varvara Liubart as Desdemona, with academic Valerian Revutsky (who watched the production) describing Desdemona as lyrical and "exceptionally gentle", with Othello as a "gullible hero" subjected to emotional devastation over the course of the play.

Othello was an unexpected success for Saksahansky (aged 67 at the time), who had been previously viewed by leftist drama critics as elderly and outdated. According to Makaryk, Saksahansky's Othello drew international attention at the time, with Western media covering it as a box-office success and a popular reaction against modernism. Over time, its fame would continue to grow in the Soviet Union, helped by Joseph Stalin's rise to power and modernism's fall from favour in place of socialist realism. Makaryk notes that Saksahansky's Othello "inadvertently confirmed [Ukraine's] colonial cultural position by embracing the authority of author, character, and the literary text," and ties it to the rise of Dnipropetrovsk over the course of Soviet history into one of the main industrial centres of Ukraine and the entire Soviet Union. The script of the play is believed by Makaryk to be lost; only a brief recollection by actor Les Oles and some extant photographs remain.

== Final years and death ==
Saksahansky remained in a positive public light in the years leading up to his death, being awarded the title of People's Artist of Ukraine in 1925 and People's Artist of the USSR in 1936. In his final years, Saksahansky was praised for his commitment to realism and his Othello became recognised as the basis for future performances of Shakespeare, not only in the Ukrainian Soviet Socialist Republic, but throughout the entire Soviet Union. In the press, he was praised as a consistent adherent of realism and opponent of the West and its theories, as well as of capitalism and liberalism; it was also emphasized that he had never opposed the cultural ties between Ukraine and Russia. In the last years of his life, Saksahansky was fond of Soviet leader Joseph Stalin for his rejection of modernism; at his final public appearance before his death (a celebration of his theatrical career), Saksahansky joined observers in exclaiming "long live Stalin!"

In 1934, Saksahansky became very ill. His wife, Nina, became his full-time caretaker. He died on 17 September 1940 in Kyiv at the age of 81, and was buried in Baikove Cemetery. Following his death, Nina handed over his flat to the Ukrainian SSR's Ministry of Culture, along with a collection of his personal belongings, which were then used to create a museum to Saksahansky.
