= Maria Zankovetska =

Ukrainian actress

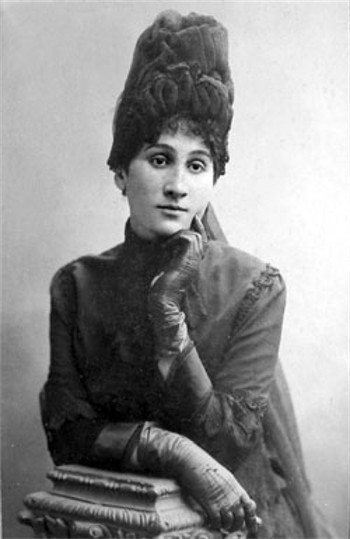
- Born: Maria Adasovska; 4 August 1854; Zanky, Nizhyn County, Chernihiv Governorate (now Ukraine)
- Died: 4 October 1934 (aged 80); Kyiv, Ukrainian SSR (now Ukraine)
- Occupation: Theater actress
- Years active: 1876-1934

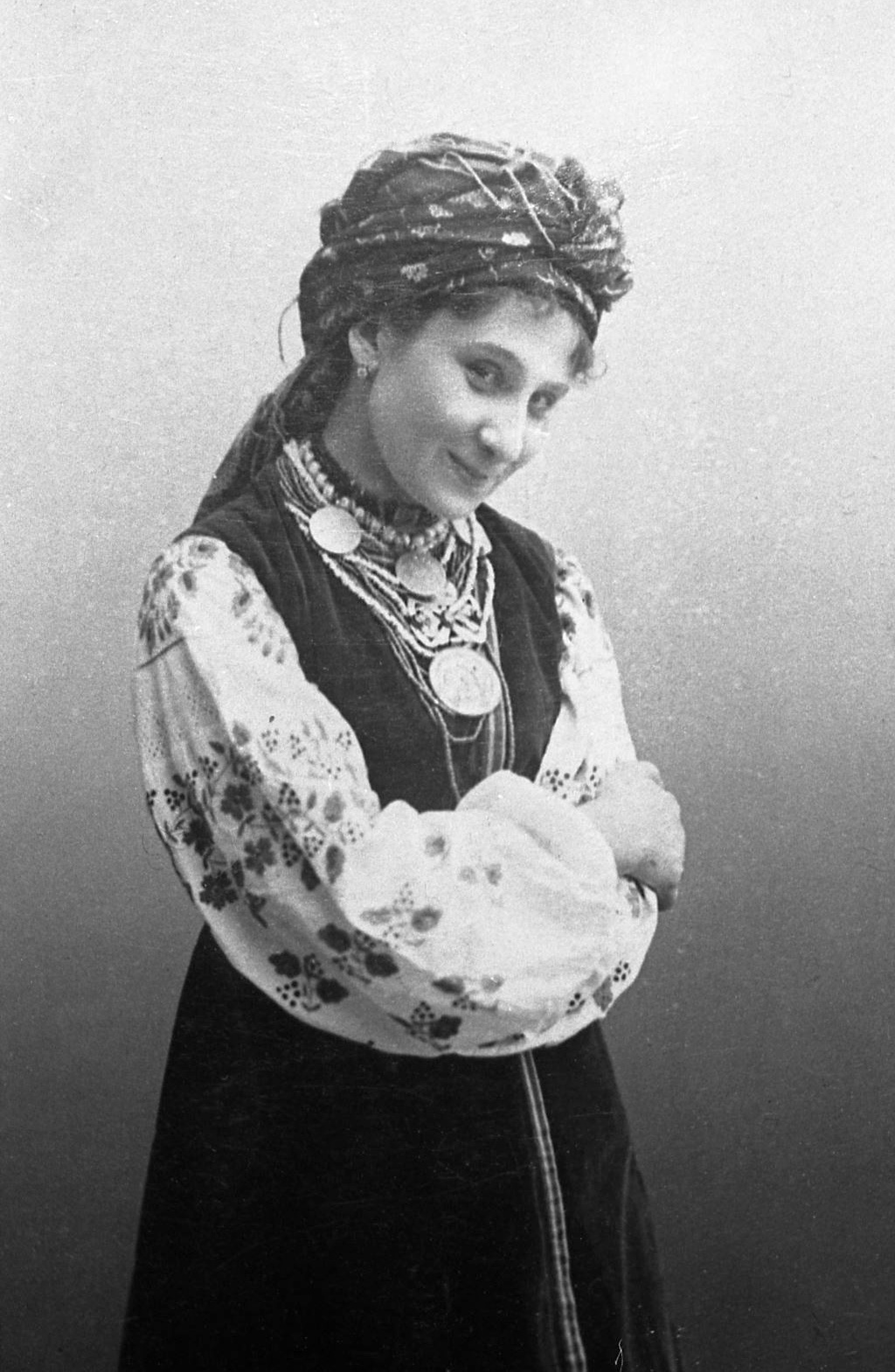
Maria Zankovetska in the role of "Tsvirkunka", 1892

Maria Kostiantynivna Adasovska (Note: Also transliterated as Mariia) (Ukrainian: Марія Костянтинівна Адасовська; 4 August 1854 – 4 October 1934), better known under her pseudonym Maria Zankovetska (Ukrainian: Марія Заньковецька) was a Ukrainian theater actress. Some sources date her birth to 3 August 1860.

In 1922, Zankovetska became the first recipient of the People's Artist of Ukraine (People's Artist of Ukrainian SSR).

== Biography ==
Maria was born to an impoverished landowner and nobleman, Kostyantyn Adasovsky, and a Chernihiv city resident (burgess) Maria Nefedova, in Zanky, Nizhyn County, Chernihiv Governorate (present-day Nizhyn Raion, Chernihiv Oblast, Ukraine). She had many siblings. Maria was a graduate of the Chernihiv City Female Gymnasium.

On May 11, 1875, Maria married Alexey Antonovich Khlystov, commander of the 5th Artillery Brigade of the 3rd Artillery Company, and moved to Bessarabia, where she met Mykola Sadovskyi. Alexei was later transferred to Sveaborg (now Suomenlinna), and Maria began to study vocal music in nearby Helsinki, under the tutelage of the Hrimaly brothers.

In 1876, she first appeared onstage in Nizhyn Theater. Her professional career began on 27 October 1882 at the Yelizavetgrad City Theater (Kropyvnytsky) under the management of Marko Kropyvnytsky. Her first role was Natalka from the Kotlyarevsky play "Natalka Poltavka". Later Maria participated among the most popular and professional Ukrainian troupes of Marko Kropyvnytsky, Mykhailo Starytsky, Mykola Sadovsky, and Panas Saksahansky. Her stage name Zankovetska was derived from the name of the village of her birth. Her repertoire included more than 30 roles. A mezzo-soprano, she sang in Ukrainian folk songs.

Zankovetska was an activist for the opening in Nizhyn of a permanent state theater. In 1918, she organized a people's theater "Ukrainian troupe under the direction of M. Zankovetska", where she played with such actors as Borys Romanytsky, Andriy Rotmyrov, and others. Several plays were set among which were "Natalka Poltavka", "Hetman Doroshenko", and "Aza the Gypsy". Recognizing her stage merits, in June 1918 the Hetman of Ukraine Pavlo Skoropadsky approved the adoption by the Council of Ministers of a resolution on the appointment of a lifetime state pension for Zankovetska.

In 1922, Ukraine triumphantly celebrated the 40th anniversary of Zankovetska's career. She was the first person in Ukraine to whom the government awarded the high title of the People's Artist of the Republic.

Zankovetska died on 4 October 1934. She is buried at Baikove Cemetery in Kyiv.

== List of selected theatrical roles ==
- 1882 – Natalka ("Natalka Poltavka", Ivan Kotlyarevsky)
- 1882 – Halya ("Nazar Stodolya", Taras Shevchenko)
- 1882 – Tsvirkunka ("Black Sea Sailors", Mykhailo Starytsky)
- 1883 – Olena ("Hlytai or the Spider", Marko Kropyvnytsky)
- 1887 – Kharytyna ("Serf Maiden", Ivan Karpenko-Karyi)
- 1889 – Katrya ("Not Destined", Mykhailo Starytsky)
- 1891 – Aksyusha ("Forest", Alexander Ostrovsky)
- 1892 – Aza ("Aza the Gypsy", Mykhailo Starytsky)
- Ulyana Kvitchyna ("Wedding in Honcharivka")
- Yo ("Loss of Nadiya", Herman Heijermans)

== Filmography ==
- 1909 – Natalka (Natalka Poltavka)
- 1923 – Mother (Ostap Bandura)

== See also ==
- Maria Zankovetska Museum
- Kateryna Rubchakova
