= Khutir Nadiia =

- Державний заповідник-музей Івана Карпенка-Карого (Тобілевича) «Хутір Надія»
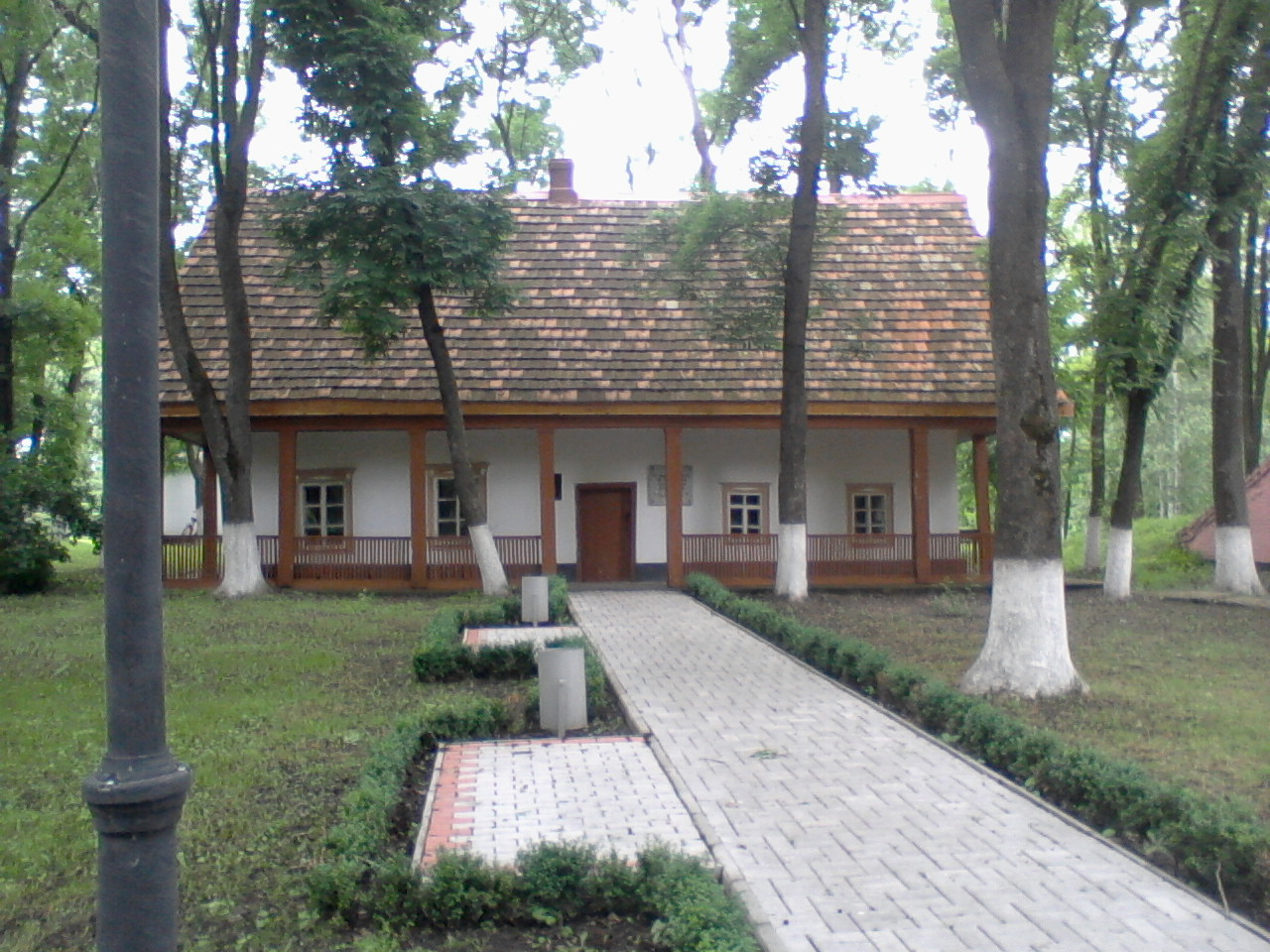
- Interactive map of the Khutir Nadiia area

General information
- Type: State Museum-Reserve
- Location: Kropyvnytskyi Raion, Kirovohrad Oblast, Ukraine
- Coordinates: 48°28′59″N 31°56′56″E

Immovable Monument of National Significance of Ukraine
- Official name: Садиба “Хутір Надія” (Khutir Nadiia Estate)
- Type: History, Garden and Park Art
- Reference no.: 110006-Н

The Karpenko-Karyi State Museum-Reserve "Khutir Nadiia" is a national historic reserve in Ukraine that was established on a territory of estate that belonged to Ivan Karpenko-Karyi, the playwright and theatrical figure of the late 19th – early 20th century.

The small complex is located 29 km (18 mi) west of Kropyvnytskyi (former Kirovohrad, Yelizavetgrad, Lyzavethrad) in the village of Mykolaivka and not far from the major european route E50.

== History ==
=== Early days ===
The estate itself was founded in 1871 by the playwright's father Karpo Tobilevych and named in honor of his wife, Nadiya Tarkovska. Later, Karpenko-Karyi chose this estate as his permanent residence.

In the beginning Tobilevych family kept the estate as modest private farm. It was from that time that the "Father's Hut" and the old Chumak well have been preserved. After returning from three years of political exile in the spring of 1887, Ivan Karpenko-Karyi settled on the farm and decided to turn it into a picturesque corner of nature – in his own words "an oasis in the desert."

=== Soviet times ===
The Khutir Nadiia was declared to be a state reserve museum in 1956. Since then the institution has been held by Kirovohrad Regional Museum. Many prominent figures of Ukrainian culture have celebrated its uniqueness, including Yuri Yanovsky, Petro Panch, Oles Honchar and Alexander Korneichuk.

In 1982, before the 100th anniversary of the Ukrainian theater luminaries, they restored the theatre that had been destroyed in 1944. On the eve of celebrating the 150th anniversary of the playwright they opened a new theater and literary and memorial exhibition.

== Theatrical notability ==
Tobilevich wrote 11 of his 18 plays at Khutir Nadiia. This included "Sto tysiach" ("One hundred thousand"), "Khaziain" ("Master"), the historical drama "Sava Chaly," "Handzia" and others.

At various times Mykola Sadovsky, Panas Saksahansky and M. Sadovska-Barilotti also lived in the manor. Visitors included the artists Zanjkovetska, M.Kropyvnytskyi, Starytskyi and many other prominent theatrical figures, writers and artists.

== Things to see ==
The complex consists of Tobilevich father's house, a memorial building, the literary-memorial museum, a park, a landscape architecture area of 11 ha, a pond and a bust of Karpenko-Kary. The traditional theater festival "The September gems" is regularly held here.

The museum holds about 2 thousand exhibits, many which belong to Tobilevych - Tarkovsky Arseny Aleksandrovich.

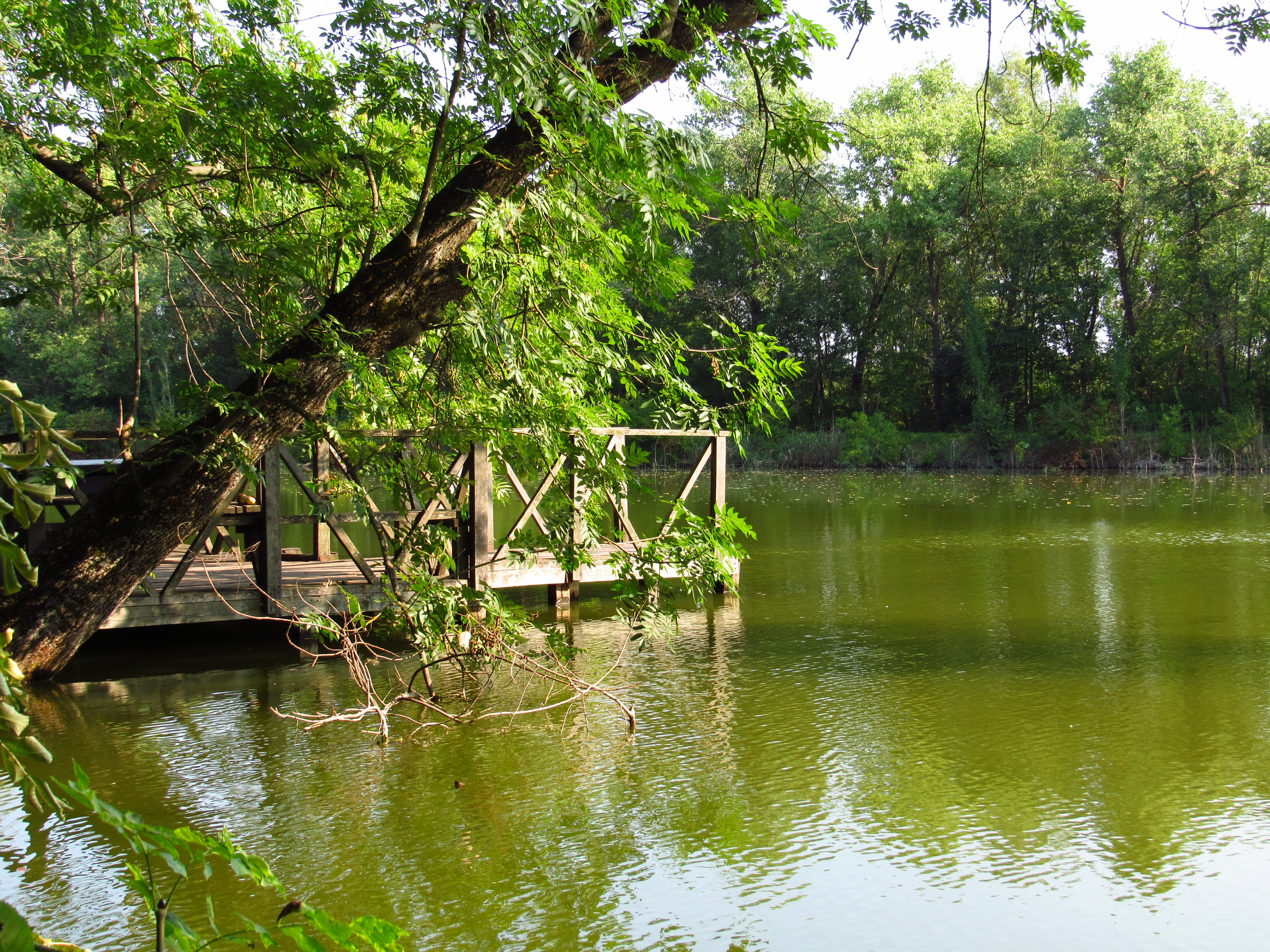
The lake in the park

The cemetery of Karlyuzhynskii is nearby, where Ivan Karpovich and his family are buried.

== The September Gems festival ==
In 1970, during the celebration of Tobilevich's 125th anniversary, "The September Gems" annual theatre festival was inaugurated. This has involved the greatest of modern Ukrainian writers and theater workers, and it became pan-Ukrainian in 1990.

== Tourism ==
Every year "Khutir Nadiia" has more than 4,000 visitors from different regions of Ukraine and abroad. It was nominated to be one of the Seven Wonders of Ukraine, although it did not make the final list.

== Sources ==
- Державний музей-заповідник І.Карпенка-Карого (Тобілевича) "Хутір Надія"
- Простіть, Андрію Юрійовичу, не вберегли...(An article about the destruction of "Khutir Nadiia" by a radical reconstruction)
- Приїжджайте на Хутір «Надія»!
