= Ivan Karpenko-Karyi =

Ukrainian playwright and writer (1845–1907)

Ivan Karpenko-Karyi Іван Карпенко-Карий
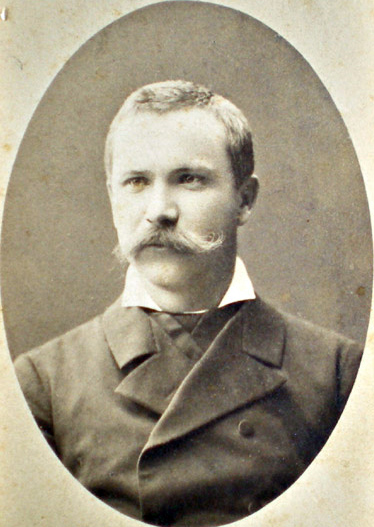
- Born: Ivan Karpovych Tobilevych (Іван Карпович Тобілевич); 29 September 1845; Arsenevka, Kherson Governorate, Russian Empire (now Arsenivka, Kirovohrad Oblast, Ukraine)
- Died: 15 September 1907 (aged 61); Berlin, German Empire
- Occupations: Playwright, actor, theater worker
- Spouses: Nadiia Tarkovska (m. 1870; died 1881) Sofiia Tarkovska (m. 1883)
- Children: Mariia Tobilevych Kresan
- Relatives: Karpo Tobilevych (father); Mykola Sadovskyi (brother); Panas Saksahanskyi (brother); Maria Sadovska Barilotti (sister); Arseny Tarkovsky (nephew)
- Writing career
- Pen name: Hnat Karyi, K. Adamenko
- Language: Ukrainian
- Period: 1884–1907
- Genres: Comedy, tragedy, drama
- Literary movement: Realism

Ivan Karpovych Tobilevych (Ukrainian: Іван Карпович Тобілевич, pronounced [iˈwɑn ˈkɑrpowɪtʃ tobiˈlɛwɪtʃ]; 29 September [O.S. 17 September] 1845 – 15 September [O.S. 2 September] 1907), more popularly known by his pseudonym Karpenko-Karyi (Note: His pseudonym, Karpenko-Karyi, is derived from the name of his father, Karp, and his favourite literary character, Hnat Karyi, who is the hero in Taras Shevchenko's play, Nazar Stodolia.) (Карпенко-Карий, pronounced [kɐrˈpɛnko ˈkɑrɪi̯]) was a Ukrainian writer, playwright, actor, and erudite. He was designated as one of the luminaries of Ukrainian domestic theatre.

Born and raised in the village of Arsenivka, he was the brother of Mykola Sadovskyi, Panas Saksahansky, and Maria Sadovska-Barilotti. In 1870, he married Nadia Tarkovskyi. His works began in 1883 when he wrote Novobranets. The following year he was exiled to Novocherkassk, where he wrote his first drama. Back to Ukraine, and in the last stage of his life, he went to Berlin, where he died in 1907.

His works are eighteen plays, including satiric comedies such as The Wise Man and the Fool, Martyn Borulia, Hundred Thousand, and The Master. While The Vagabond, The Status Seekers, The Servant Girl, The Fortuneless Maiden, The Father's Tale, and Along the Dnieper are his dramas. Also the historical ethnographic plays, including A Madcap of the 18th Century and Sava Chalyi.

== Biography ==
Tobilevych was on 29 September 1845, at Arsenevka, a village in central Ukraine near Yelisavetgrad (now Kropyvnytskyi). He was in the family of the estate manager, Karp Tobilevich. He studied at the Bobrynetsky District School, and from 1859 he worked as a bailiff's clerk in the town of Mala Vyska and later as a clerk of the city administration. He worked in the county court in 1864.

Moved to Yelisavetgrad in 1865, he worked as the head of the district police department, participated in amateur performances by Oleksandr Tarkovsky, published literary and critical articles, and later became a member of the illegal Narodovo circle of Opanas Mykhalevych. In 1870, he married Nadia Tarkovsky, the aunt of city poet and journalist Arsenyi Tarkovskyi. As a dowry, he received the Tarkovskys' family farm, and they had seven children. Nadia died in 1881, and his daughter, Halyna, died in the following year. In 1883, he was dismissed from the post of police secretary and exiled for supplying revolutionaries with passports.

His first role in performance began in the 1880s when he played in the troupe of Marko Kropyvnytsky. He published his first story in Ukrainian, "Novobranets", in the almanac "Rada", signed under the pseudonym Hnat Kariy, in 1883.

Arrested in 1884, he was exiled to Novocherkassk, where he worked as a blacksmith and later opened a bookbinding workshop. During his exile, he wrote his first drama, Shepherd (Burglaka), as well as the plays Bondarivna, Wise Man and the Fool, Naimichka, and Talentless. In 1886, a collection of his dramas was published in Kherson, including Bondarivna, Who is guilty? and Reasonable and Fool. After he was released in 1887, he returned to Ukraine with his wife, Sofia, and settled on a farm that was named after his first wife, Nadia. Today, the farm is a historical and cultural reserve and museum.

His drama, Naymichka, was published in 1887, and Martin Borulya in Zora in 1892. In 1888, public supervision over him was removed, and he joined the troupe of his brother, Mykola Sadovskyi, and later the troupe of another brother, Panas Saksaganskyi. The virtues of his dramas are liveliness, the integrity of characters, and well-chosen language. In 1890, he joined the Society of Ukrainian Artists and wrote the comedy Hundred Thousand.

He wrote a note to the Congress of Stage Actors in Moscow that was dedicated to the persecution of the Ukrainian theatre, which Panas Saksaganskyi read from the podium of the congress. In 1899, he wrote the historical tragedy Sava Chaly, dedicated to the events of the 18th-century Haydamak revolts.

He fell ill in 1906, left the stage, and went to Berlin for treatment. After a serious illness, Tobilevych died on 15 September 1907 in Berlin. His remains were brought back to Ukraine and buried at the Nadiya Farm.
