= Marko Kropyvnytskyi =

Ukrainian playwright (1840–1910)

Marko Kropyvnytskyi Марко Кропивницький
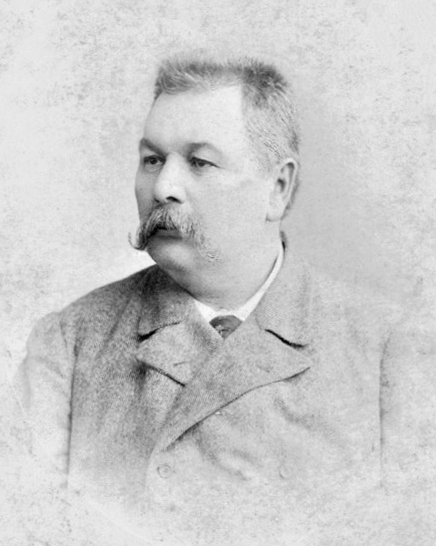
- Kropyvnytskyi in the 1890s
- Born: 22 May [O.S. 7 May] 1840; Bezhbairaky, Russian Empire
- Died: 21 April [O.S. 8 April] 1910 (aged 69); Kherson Governorate, Russian Empire
- Resting place: Kharkiv, Ukraine
- Occupations: Writer, dramaturge, composer, theatre actor and director
- Writing career
- Language: Ukrainian
- Marko Kropyvnytskyi's voice Recorded in 1910

Signature
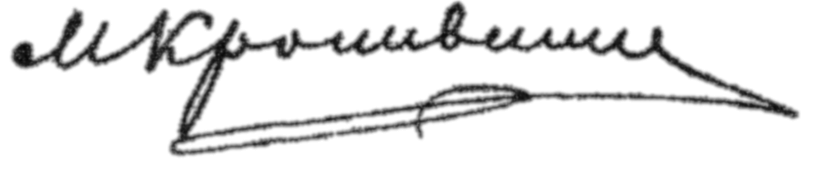

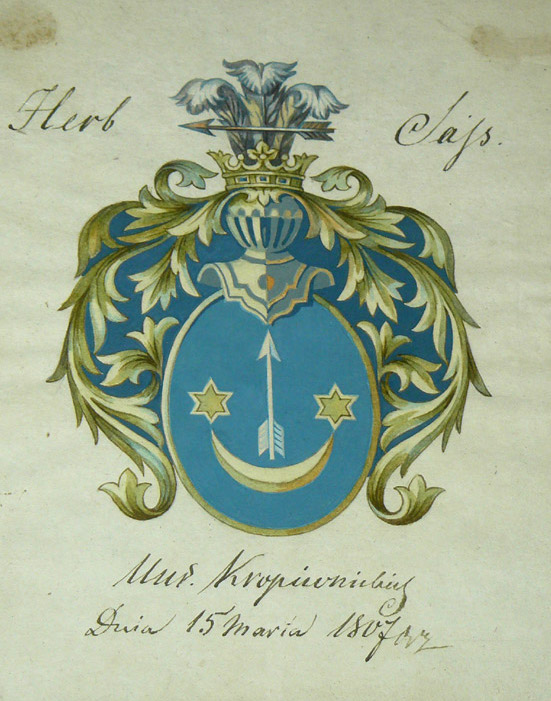
Marko Kropyvnytskyi's family coat of arms, a variant of the Sas coat of arms (see Polish heraldry)

Marko Lukych Kropyvnytskyi (Ukrainian: Марко Лукич Кропивницький; 22 May [O.S. 7 May] 1840 – 21 April [O.S. 8 April] 1910) was a Ukrainian writer, playwright, composer, theatre actor and director. Over his career Kropyvnytskyi wrote 40 plays, played in over 500 roles of various repertoire, as well as writing several songs.

In 1875, he was invited by Theophilia Romanovich to the theatrical society Ruska Besida (in English: Ruthenian conversation), and is attributed to be one of the founders of the first professional Ukrainian theatre, The Ruska Besida Theater.

== Early years ==
Marko Lukych Kropyvnytskyi was born on 7 May 1840 in Bezhbairaky village (now Kropyvnytske), in what was then Kherson Governorate of the Russian Empire, into the family of nobleman Luka Ivanovych and Kapitolina Ivanivna (née Dubrovynska) Kropyvnytskyi.

== Early career ==
In 1862 as an audit student, Kropyvnytskyi attended classes at the Law Faculty of Kiev University. Deeply impressed by a melodrama he saw in Kiev Theatre, he wrote the play "Mykyta Starostenko, or You won't know when disaster will strike" (Ukrainian: Микита Старостенко, або Незчуєшся, як лихо спобіжить). He later criticized this work as it was an attempt by inexperienced author. Now the play is known in the version, that has undergone numerous fundamental revisions. Kropyvnytskyi had not completed his education for various reasons; yet he constantly complemented to his knowledge independently, especially after he moved to Elisavetgrad, where there was a library. There, he had a chance to get acquainted with Robert Owen, John Stuart Mill, William Shakespeare, Lord Byron, Johann Wolfgang von Goethe, Heinrich Heine, Alexandre Dumas, George Sand, and William Makepeace Thackeray, among other writers. In his government service, Kropyvnytskyi was rarely promoted, and often completely lost his earnings, due to his devotion for art and amateur performances.

In 1871, Kropyvnytskyi joined the troupe of professional actors, and agreed to work in the company of Count Morkov, in Odessa. He gained a great theatrical experience after spending over ten years in the Russian theatre troupe; he thoroughly studied the specific rules of theatre genre and learned the place of theatre in society.

In 1872 the Odessa newspaper "Novorossiysk Telegraph" published two musical comedies by Kropyvnytskyi: Reconciled and God will protect an orphan, or Unexpected Proposal.

In 1875, Kropyvnytskyi went on tour in Galicia, where he worked as an actor and director of the theatre company "Ruthenian talk"; he has made some effort to change the repertoire and artistic style of the theatre in bringing it to the realism and national character.

== Creating the Coryphee Theatre ==
In 1881, the ban on Ukrainian theatre was abolished. Though there still were many limitations and restrictions, Ukrainian troupes emerged in Kiev, Kharkiv, and Odessa. Yet, these troupes did not satisfy Kropyvnytskyi, who sought for dramatic changes in scenic art. In 1882, he organised his own company which, after around a year, merged with the Mykhailo Starytsky troupe, and Marko Kropyvnytskyi became a leading director there. A new era in the history of Ukrainian professional theatre began. Many famous actors played in Kropyvnytskyi's troupe, such as Maria Zankovetska, Mykola Sadovsky, later M.Sadovska-Barilotti, Panas Saksahansky, and Ivan Karpenko-Kary.

In his early days, Kropyvnytskyi wrote mainly comedy pieces: Reconciled (1869), God will protect an orphan, or Unexpected Proposal (1871), Actor Sinitsa (1871), A revision (1882), Mustache (1885) and others.

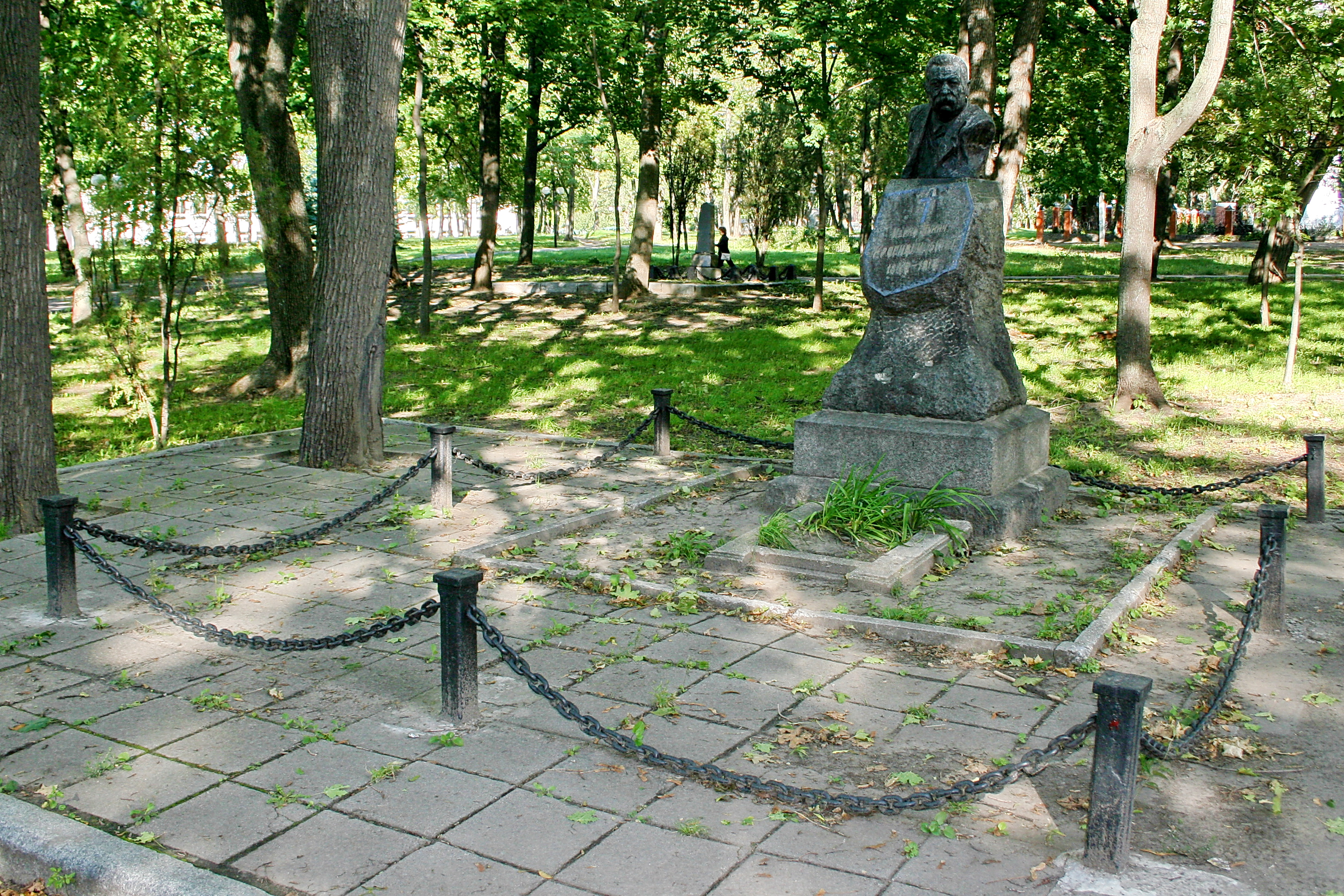
Marko Kropyvnytskyi's grave in Kharkiv

== Later period ==
In 1890s, Kropyvnytskyi called his pieces "pictures" on multiple occasions, such as his "pictures of rural movement" ("Konon Blyskavychenko", 1902, "Tough Day", 1906), "pictures of rural life" ("Old bitch and young shoots», 1908) etc.

Even in his later years, forced by worsening health to settle in a farm House, Kropyvnytskyi often travelled to participate in theatre performances, he continued writing plays. Kropyvnytskyi bothered for organization of a school for farmers and their children, created two plays for children, using folk motifs (Ivasik-Telesyk, On the wave of the wand), and worked on its staging at the farm.

Kropyvnytskyi died on 21 April 1910 on his way from Odessa, where he was on tour. He was buried in Kharkiv.

== Legacy ==
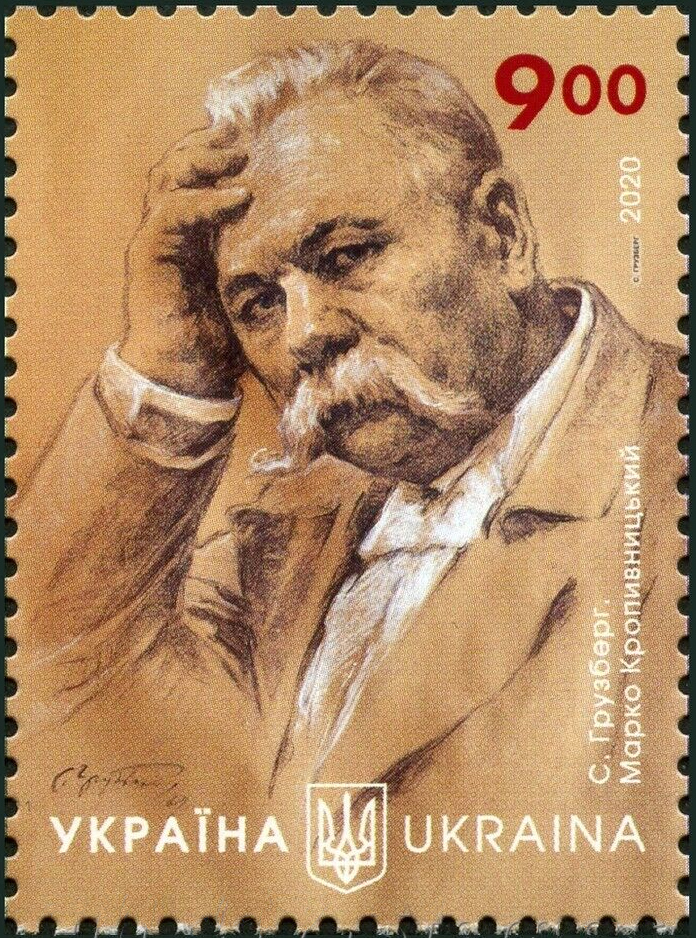
Kropyvnytskyi on a 2020 stamp of Ukraine

In July 2016 the city of Kirovohrad was renamed Kropyvnytskyi in his honour.

In 2008 Marko's grandson, Ihor Kropyvnytskyi said the following, "Created by Marko Kropyvnytskyi under conditions of brutal national oppression, the professional theatre was one of main sources of cultural revival of the yoked nation during many years, particularly considering that many of our compatriots were illiterate at that time and were not able to read wonderful poetry and stories of Taras Shevchenko, Marko Vovchok, Ivan Franko and other Ukrainian writers. The Marko Kropyvnytskyi Theatre gave not only an extraordinary push for further development of Ukrainian culture, but also played a prominent socio-political role in the life of Ukrainians, became one of important spiritual foundations on which many decades later the independent Ukrainian state was built".

Maksym Rylsky wrote the following about Kropyvnytskyi, "Let's lower our foreheads: a genius was here, for people he worked and was tormented, so that the people would be treated justly, so that the land would be green in garden's bloom" (Ukrainian: Схилим чоло: тут віяв геній, Народу син творив тут і страждав, Щоб для народу домогтися прав, Щоб на землі сади цвіли зелені...).

== See also ==
- Mykola Voronyi
