= Zaporozhets za Dunayem =

- comic opera by Semen Hulak-Artemovsky
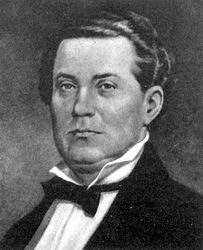
- The composer and librettist
- Native title: Ukrainian: Запорожець за Дунаєм
- Translation: Cossack Beyond the Danube
- Librettist: Hulak-Artemovsky
- Language: Ukrainian / Russian
- Premiere: 26 April 1863; St Petersburg

Zaporozhets za Dunayem (Ukrainian: «Запорожець за Дунаєм», lit. 'A Zaporozhian (Cossack) Beyond the Danube', also referred to as Cossacks in Exile) is a Ukrainian comic opera with spoken dialogue in three acts with music and libretto by the composer Semen Hulak-Artemovsky (1813–1873) about Cossacks of the Danubian Sich. The orchestration has subsequently been rewritten by composers such as Reinhold Glière and Heorhiy Maiboroda. This is one of the best-known Ukrainian comic operas depicting national themes.

It was premiered with a Russian libretto on 26 April [O.S. 14 April] 1863, in St Petersburg (at the time the capital of the Russian Empire). However, it is now normally performed in a Ukrainian translation.

== Composition history ==
According to contemporary accounts, Hulak-Artemovsky based the libretto on a story by the historian Mykola Kostomarov. The composer wrote nearly all of libretto, although some poetic phrasings are attributed to his good friend, the journalist V. Sykevych.

The story depicts the events following the destruction of the island fortress of Zaporizhian Sich, the historic stronghold of the Ukrainian Cossacks on the Dnieper River. Although historically this destruction was ordered by the Russian Empress Catherine II in 1775, for unknown reasons the composer chose to set the action in 1772. To tell the story of the freedom-loving Zaporozhian Cossacks of Ukraine, who had fought against the Russian Empire, Hulak-Artemovsky deliberately set the story in Turkish lands with the Cossacks fighting for the Sultan. This change of locale helped the work get past the Tsar's censors, who normally banned stories about Ukrainian Cossacks.

The orchestral score was completed in the autumn of 1862 by Konstantin Lyadov, (father of Anatoly Lyadov), who developed it under the guidance of Hulak-Artemovsky. Hulak-Artemovsky had composed the original piano score and written the libretto (in Russian), no later than 12 July of that year (as the earliest known manuscript bears that date). The libretto and score were first published in 1866 in St Petersburg, by the firm of F. Stelovsky.

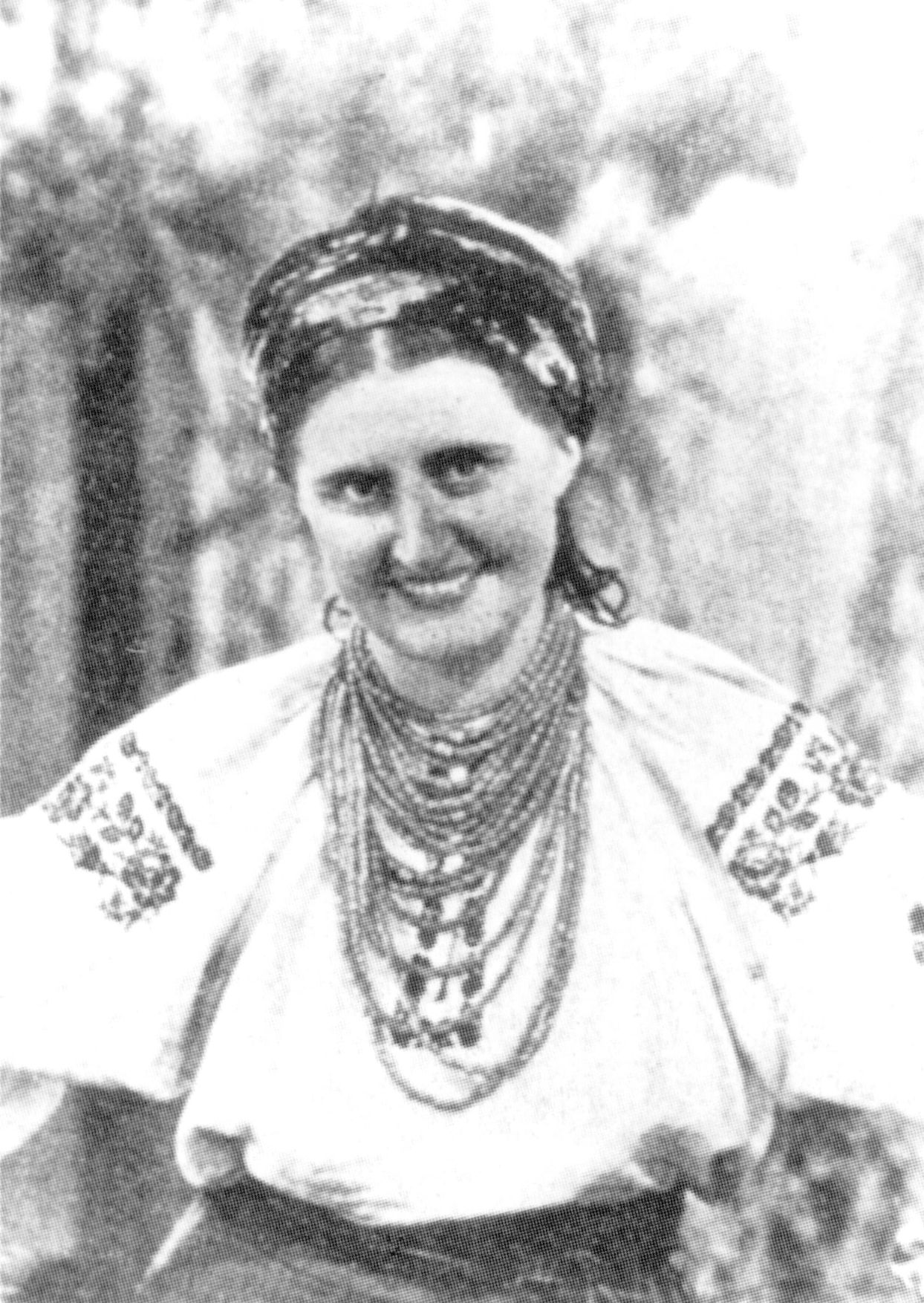
Soprano Maria Sokil in character as Odarka

In 1902, the Ukrainian composer Oleksandr Horily wrote the aria Prylyn', prylyn (Ukrainian: Пpилинь, пpилинь – "Come, come"), when arranging the comic opera for Mykola Sadovsky's theatrical troupe. The aria essentially extended the vocal range of the character Oksana, who had previously been played by mezzo-sopranos; this aria is intended for a soprano.

After 1898, the original role of Prokop Teren (Ukrainian: Пpoкoп Tepeн), a rival of Andriy for the affections of Oksana, was eliminated (although in Moscow, the role was performed up until 1915).

== Roles ==
Role	Voice type	Premiere cast 26 April 1863
Ivan Karas, a Zaporozhian Cossack, aged 45–50	bass	Semen Hulak-Artemovsky
Odarka, aged 35, wife of Karas	soprano	
Andriy, a young Zaporozhian Cossack	tenor	
Oksana, an orphan maiden, raised by Karas and Odarka	soprano (originally mezzo-soprano)	Darya Leonova
The Sultan, aged 30	baritone	
Selikh-Aha, a Turkish lord	tenor	
Ibrahim-Ali, an Imam	bass	
Hasan, a servant		

== Synopsis ==
The story is based on a historical event: when the Zaporizhian Sich was overwhelmed by the Russian army, the Zaporizhian Cossacks and their families headed across the Danube River to the apparently safe haven of the Ottoman Empire (this area is now part of Romania) and established the Danube Sich (see Zaporozhian Host: Russian rule).

The comedy arises from the efforts made by a Cossack clan to adjust to their new home, and from the eccentric behaviour of an amorous Turkish Sultan. The plot revolves around a chance encounter between Ivan Karas, an old Dnieper Cossack and the Turkish Sultan travelling incognito, resulting in permission for all the "Cossacks beyond the Danube" to resettle on Imperial Russian land, back in Ukraine.

== Noted arias ==
- Transliterated title: Prylyn', prylyn, Ukrainian: Пpилинь, пpилинь – "Come, come" – Act 1 (Oksana)
- Transliterated title: Vidkilya tse ty usiavsa, Ukrainian: Вiдкiля цe ти узявca – "Where did you come from?" – Act 1 (Odarka and Karas').
- Transliterated title: Chorna khmara za dibrovy, Ukrainian: Чорна xмapa з-за дiбpoви --"Black Clouds Behind the Grove" – Act 2 (Oksana and Andriy)
- – "O Lord of Heaven and Earth" – (Chorus)

== Recordings ==
Zaporozhets za Dunayem (A Cossack Beyond the Danube)

- Ivan Karas: Sergei Yaroshenko, bass; Odarka: Natalia Moiseyeva; Andrei: Stepan Fitysch; Oksana: Lidiya Zabiliasta; The Sultan: Mykola Koval; Imam: Ivan Tcherney; Selih-Aga: Yuri Khomych
- Chorus and Orch of the National Opera of Ukraine/Ivan Hamkalo.
- Recorded in May 2009 at the National Opera and Ballet Theatre of Ukraine, Kiev. 1hr 48'

== Film ==
Zaporozhets Za Dunayem also known as Cossacks Beyond the Danube 1938-Ukraine/USSR-Costume Adventure/Film-Opera

Produced in Ukraine by a home-grown production staff, this comic opera was released in English-speaking countries as Cossacks Beyond the Danube. Distributor: Amkino; Running Time: 73 minutes; Starring: Stepan Shkurat; Directed by: Ivan Kavaleridze
