= List of theatres in Ukraine =

This list includes the theaters of Ukraine as of spring 2010 in accordance with the current administrative division of the state. This list, though incomplete, includes both state theaters (possibly all) and folk, as well as private.

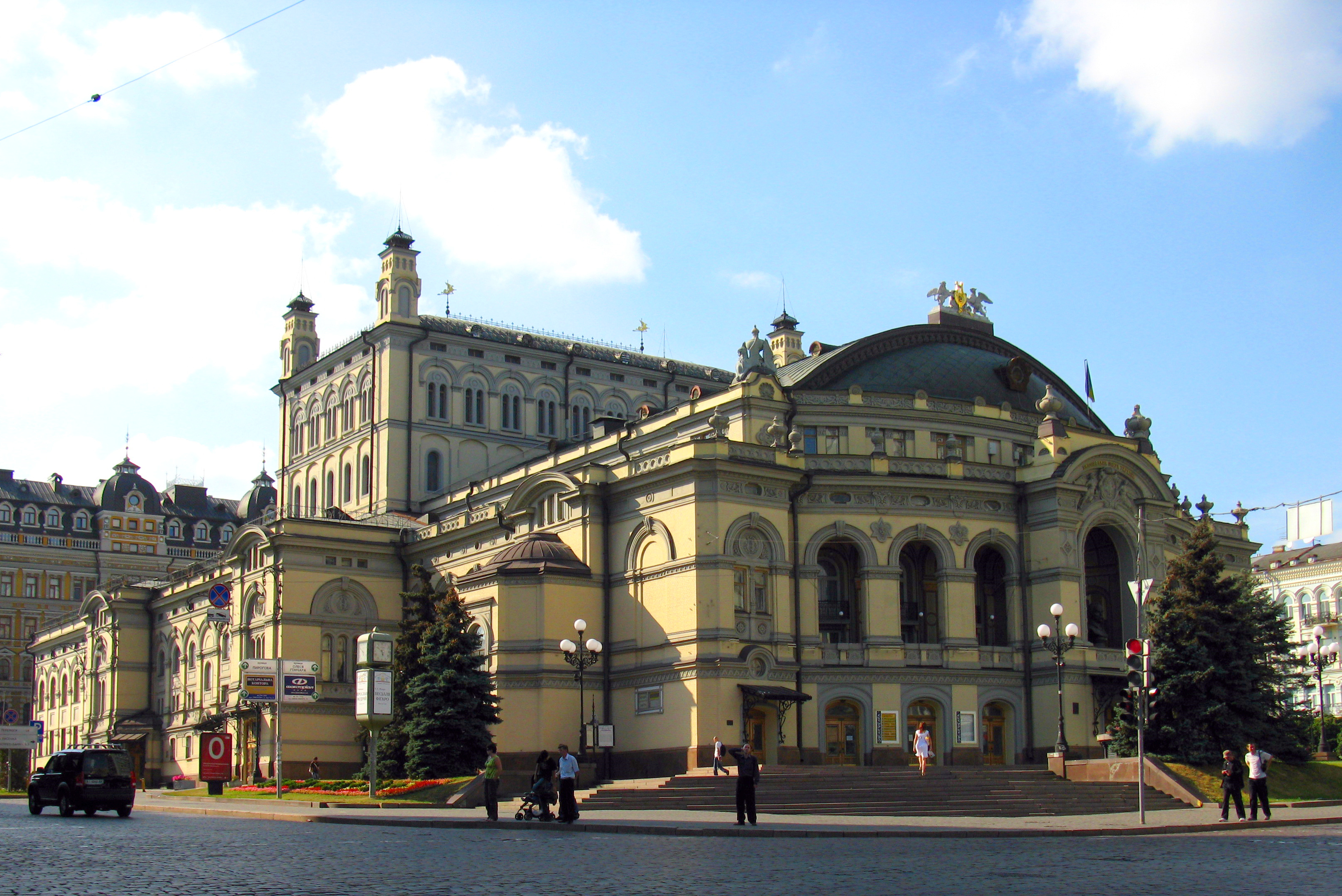
National Opera of Ukraine

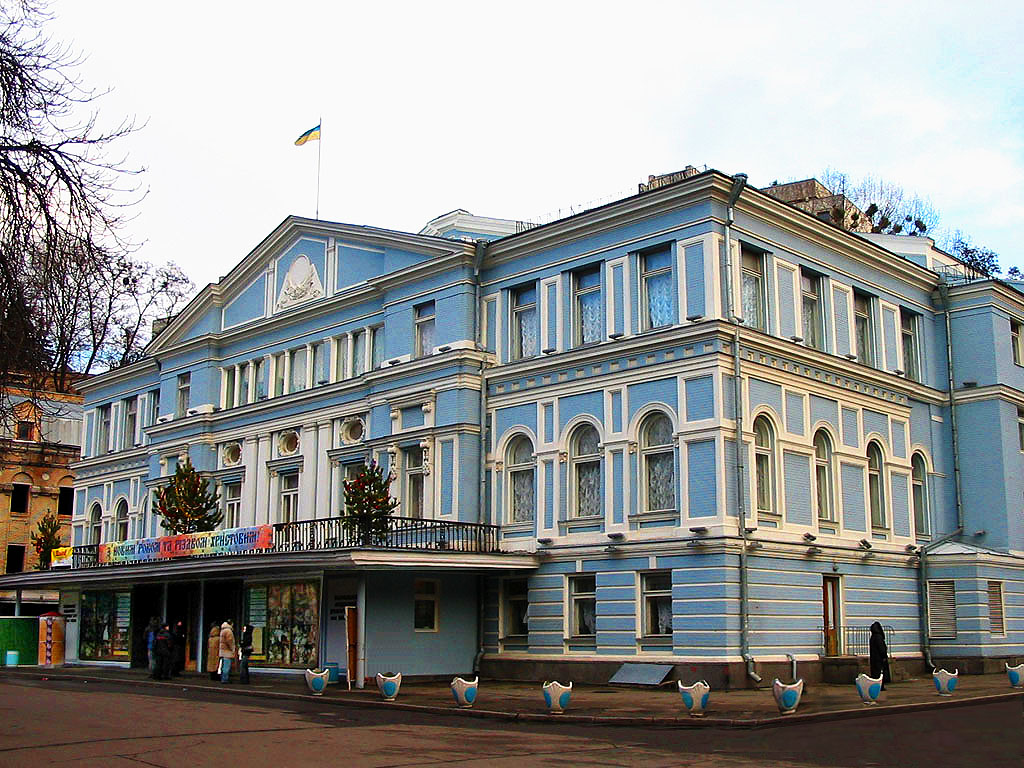
Ivan Franko National Academic Drama Theater

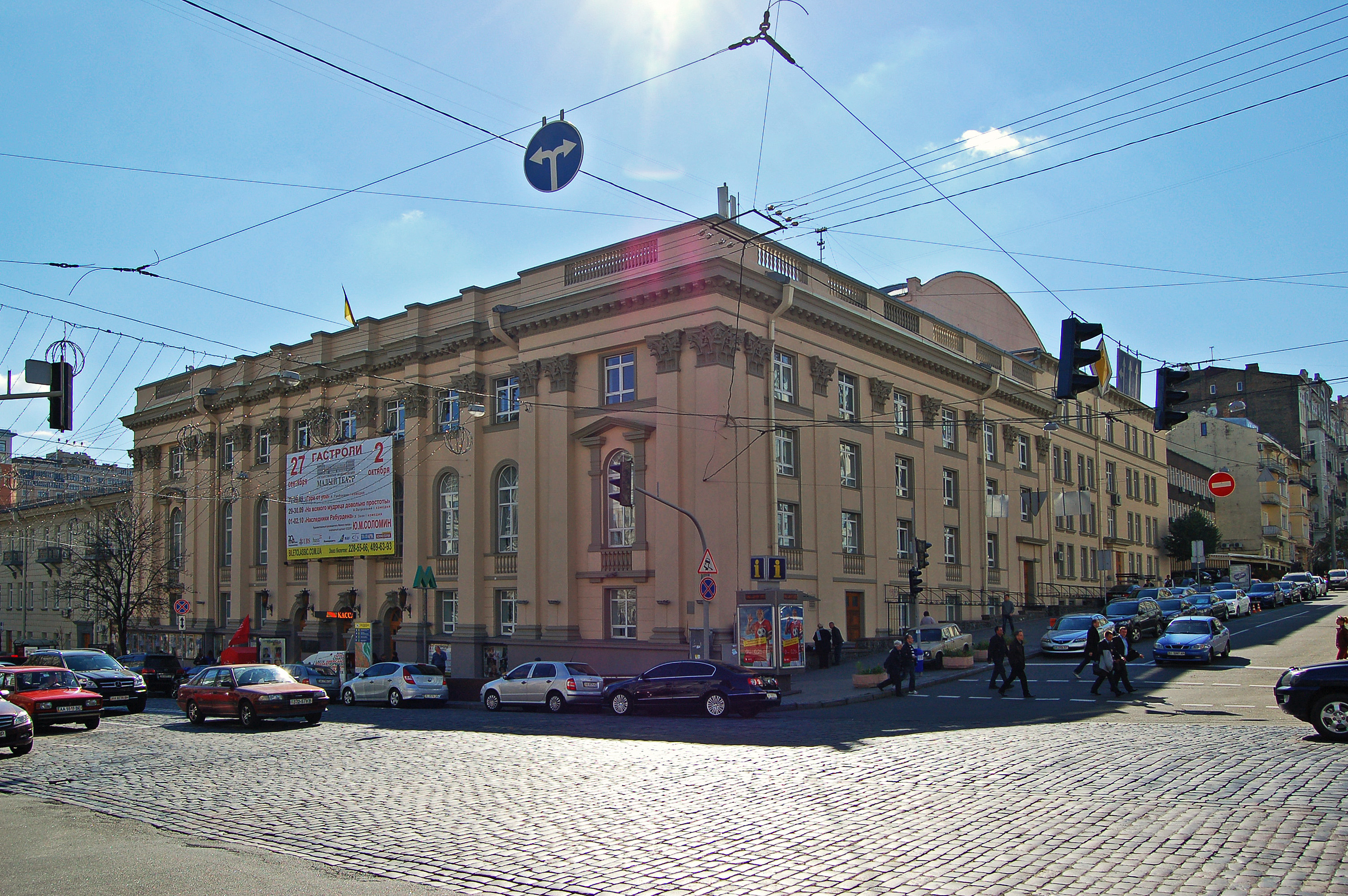
Lesia Ukrainka National Academic Theater

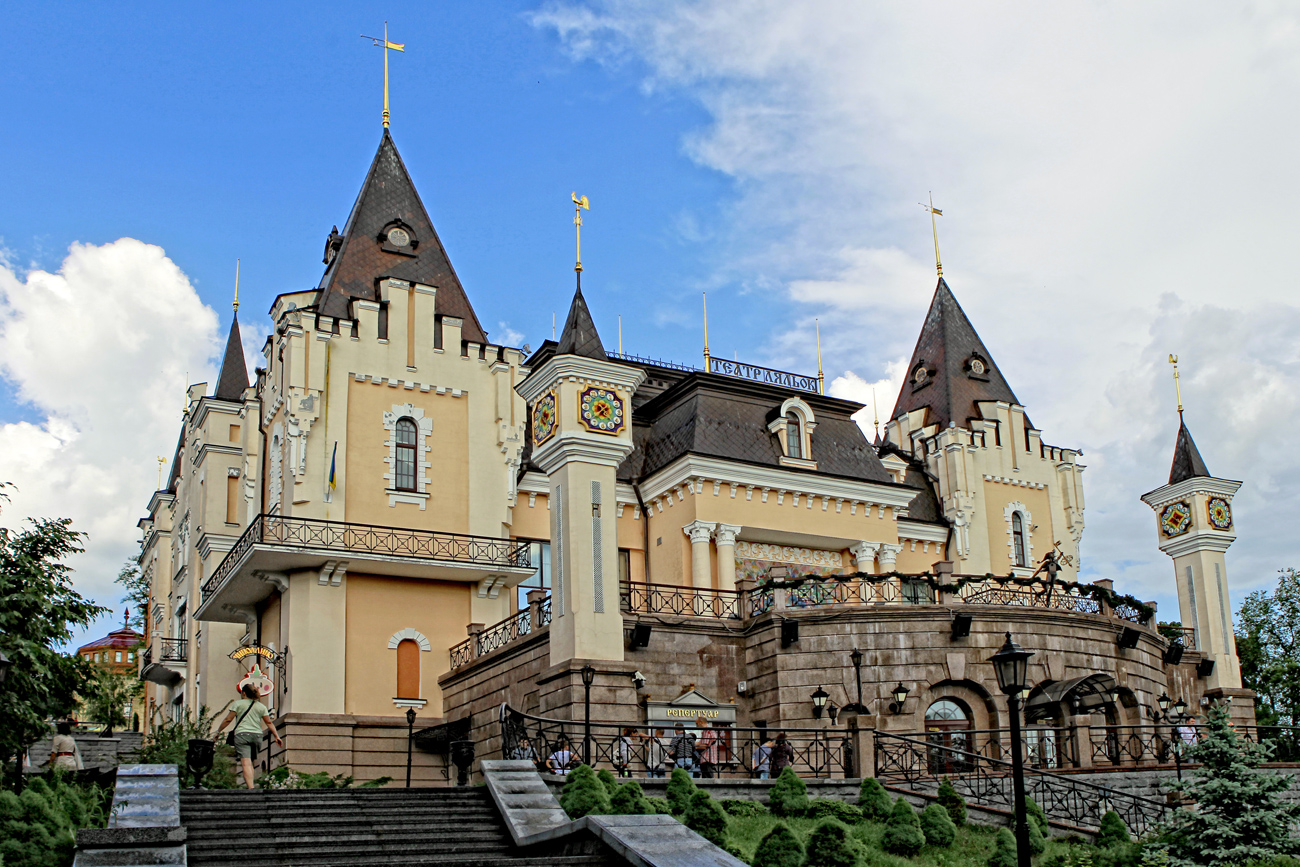
Kyiv Academic Puppet Theatre

== Kyiv ==
State-owned

- National Opera of Ukraine
- Ivan Franko National Academic Drama Theater
- Lesia Ukrainka National Academic Theater
- Kyiv National Academic Theatre of Operetta

Municipally-owned

- Kyiv Municipal Academic Opera and Ballet Theatre for Children and Youth

Community-owned

- Kyiv National Academic Molodyy Theatre
- Kyiv Academic Puppet Theatre
- Kyiv Municipal Academic Puppet Theater
- Kyiv Academic Theater for Young Spectators on Lipskaia Street
- Kyiv Academic Drama Theater in Podil
- Kyiv Academic Theatre of Drama and Comedy on the left bank of Dnieper
- Actor Theater
- Kyiv Puppet Theater
- Kyiv Academic Theater Workshop "Constellation"
- Kyiv Academic Theater "Koleso"
- Kyiv Gypsy Theater "Romance"
- Kyiv Academic Theatre of Ukrainian Folklore
- Ukrainian Small Drama Theater
- New Theatre on Pechersk
- Kyiv Academic Theater "Golden Gate"

Beyond the sphere of management of the Ministry of Culture of Ukraine

- PostPlay
- Kyiv Drama Theater "Bravo"
- Dakh Theatre - Centre of Contemporary Arts
- Theater of Ukrainian Tradition "Dzerkalo"
- Theatre «Dyvnyy Zamok»
- Wild Theater
- Mykola Rushkovsky's Theater Workshop
- Youth Interactive Modern Theatre "Mist"
- Volodymyr Zavalnyuk's "Transformation" Theater
- Arts Center "New Ukrainian Theatre" on Mikhailovskaia Street
- Kyiv Millennium Theater
- Black Square Improvisation Theater-Studio

== Sevastopol ==
- Sevastopol Academic Russian Drama Theater named after A.V. Lunacharsky
- Theater for children and youth "On the Great Sea"
- Russian Drama Theater of the Black Sea Fleet named after V.A. Lavrenov
- Sevastopol Dance Theater under the direction of VA Elizarov

== Autonomous Republic of Crimea ==
=== Simferopol ===
- Crimean Academic Russian Drama Theater named after Maxim Gorky
- Crimean Tatar Academic Music and Drama Theater
- Crimean Academic Ukrainian Musical Theater
- Crimean Academic Puppet Theater
- Simferopol Variety Ballet Theater "Phoenix"

=== Yevpatoria ===
- Evpatoria Pushkin Theater
- "Golden key" Children's Theater Complex
- Puppet Theater-Studio "Marionetky"
- Theater of choreographic miniatures
- Gender interactive theater
- Fire Theater "Wolfram"
- Living Sculpture Theater
- Stilts Theater
- Dance theater of the peoples of the world

=== Kerch ===
- Kerch Drama Theater named after Pushkin

=== Feodosia ===
- Feodosia Drama Theatre

=== Yalta ===
- Yalta Theater named after A.P. Chekhov

== Vinnytsia Oblast ==
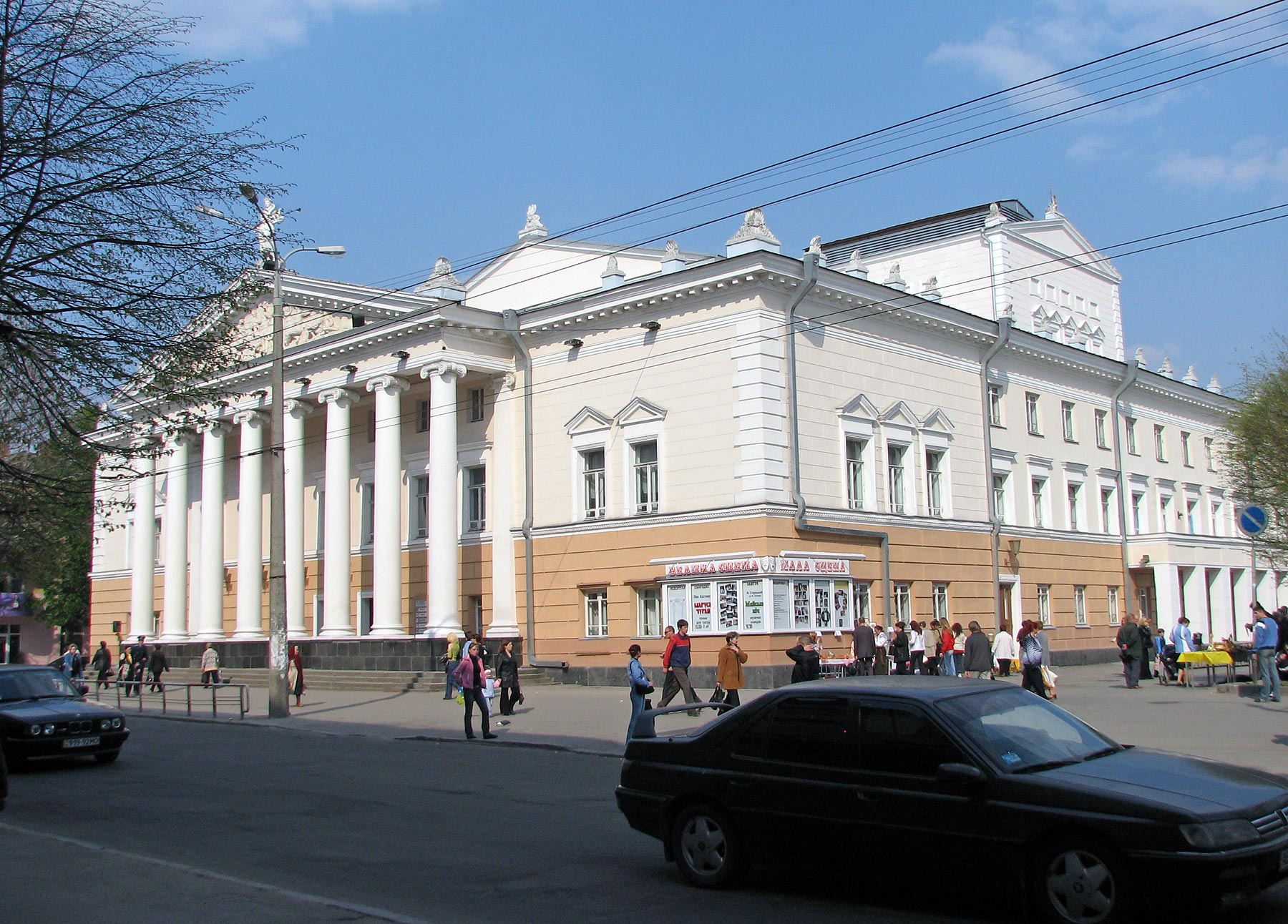
Vinnytsia Regional Academic Ukrainian Music and Drama Theater named after Mykola Sadovsky

=== Vinnytsia ===
- Vinnytsia Regional Academic Ukrainian Music and Drama Theater named after Mykola Sadovsky
- Vinnytsia Academic Regional Puppet Theater "Golden Key"

== Volyn Oblast ==
=== Lutsk ===
- Volyn Regional Academic Music and Drama Theater named after Taras Shevchenko
- Volyn Academic Regional Puppet Theater

== Dnipropetrovsk Oblast ==
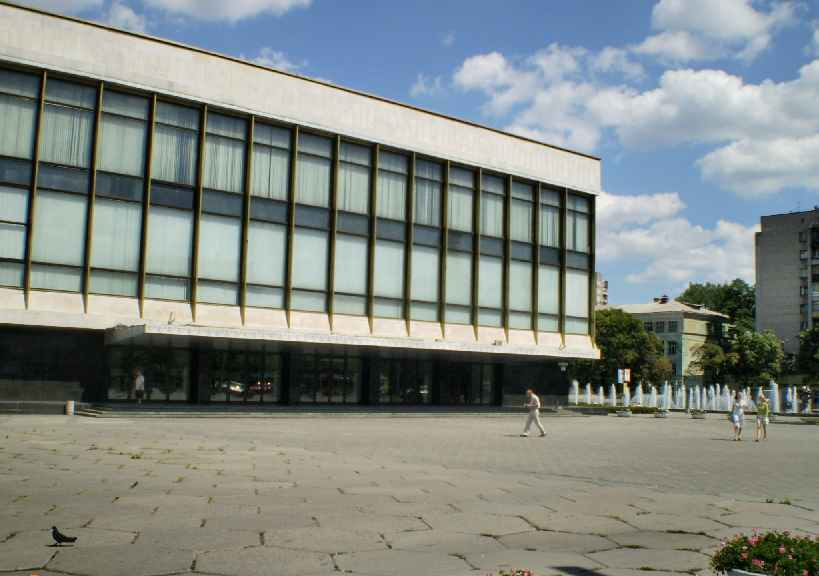
Dnipropetrovsk Academic Opera and Ballet Theater

=== Dnipro ===
- Dnipro Academic Opera and Ballet Theatre
- Taras Shevchenko Dnipro Academic Ukrainian Music and Drama Theatre
- Dnipro Academic Drama and Comedy Theatre
- Dnipro State Circus
- Kryk Theatre
- Dnipropetrovsk City Puppet Theater
- Dnipropetrovsk Regional Youth Theater
- Dnipropetrovsk City Youth Theater-Studio "Virymo!"
- Dnipropetrovsk City Teleteatr
- Dnipropetrovsk City Theater "KVN DGU"

=== Kamianske ===
- Lesia Ukrainka Academic Music and Drama Theater in Kamianske

=== Kryvyi Rih ===
- Kryvyi Rih Drama and Musical Comedy Theater named after Taras Shevchenko
- Kryvyi Rih City Puppet Theater
- Kryvyi Rih Theater of Music and Plastic Arts "Academy of Movement"
- "AVE" Theater

=== Pavlohrad ===
- Pavlograd Drama Theater named after B.E. Zakhava

=== Nikopol ===
- Nikopol Ukrainian Folk Music and Drama Theater

== Donetsk Oblast ==
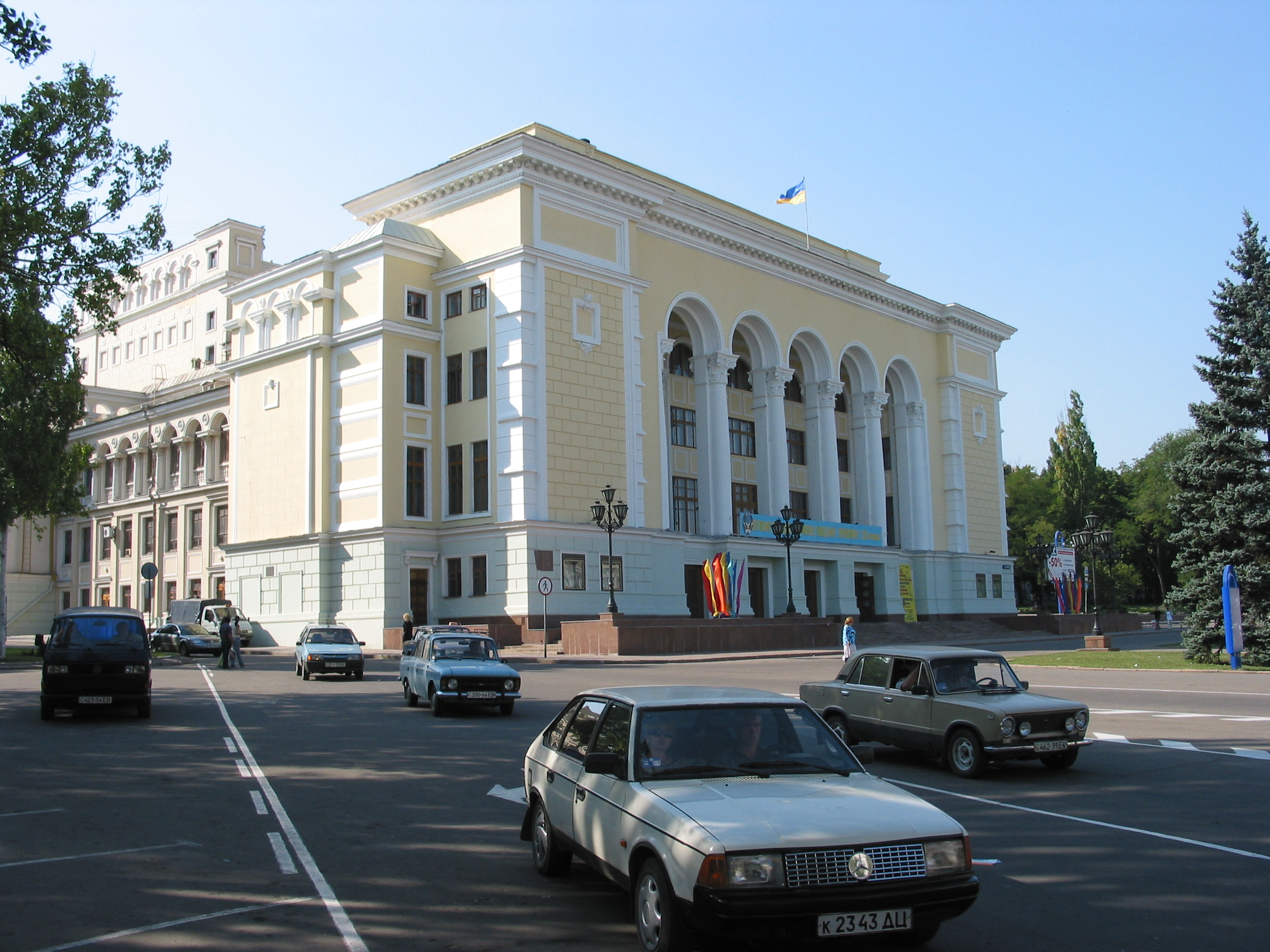
Donetsk State Academic Opera and Ballet Theatre named after A. Solovianenko

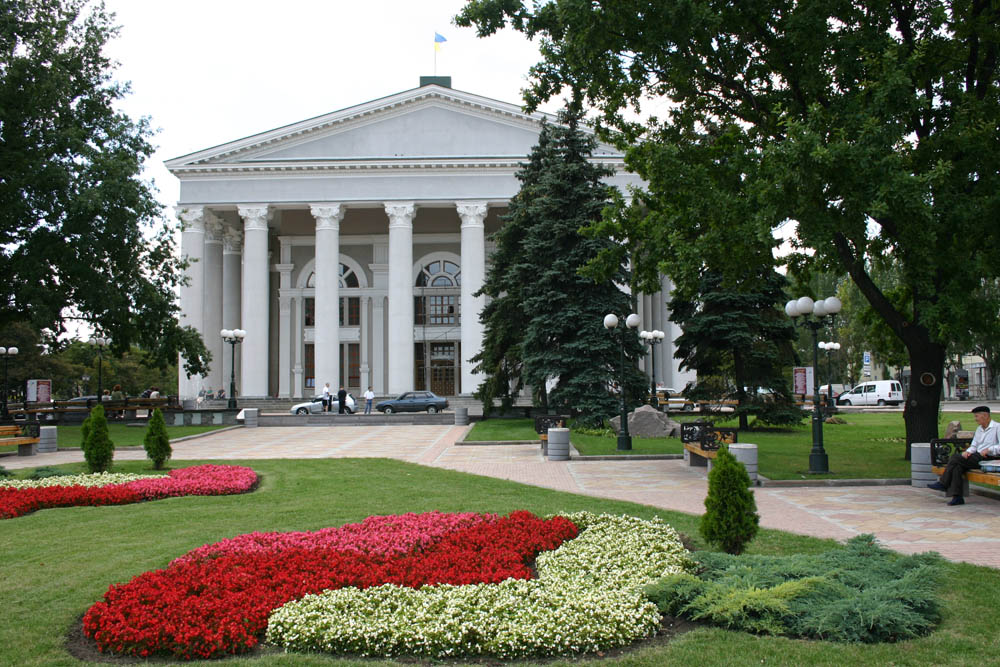
Donetsk National Academic Ukrainian Musical and Drama Theatre

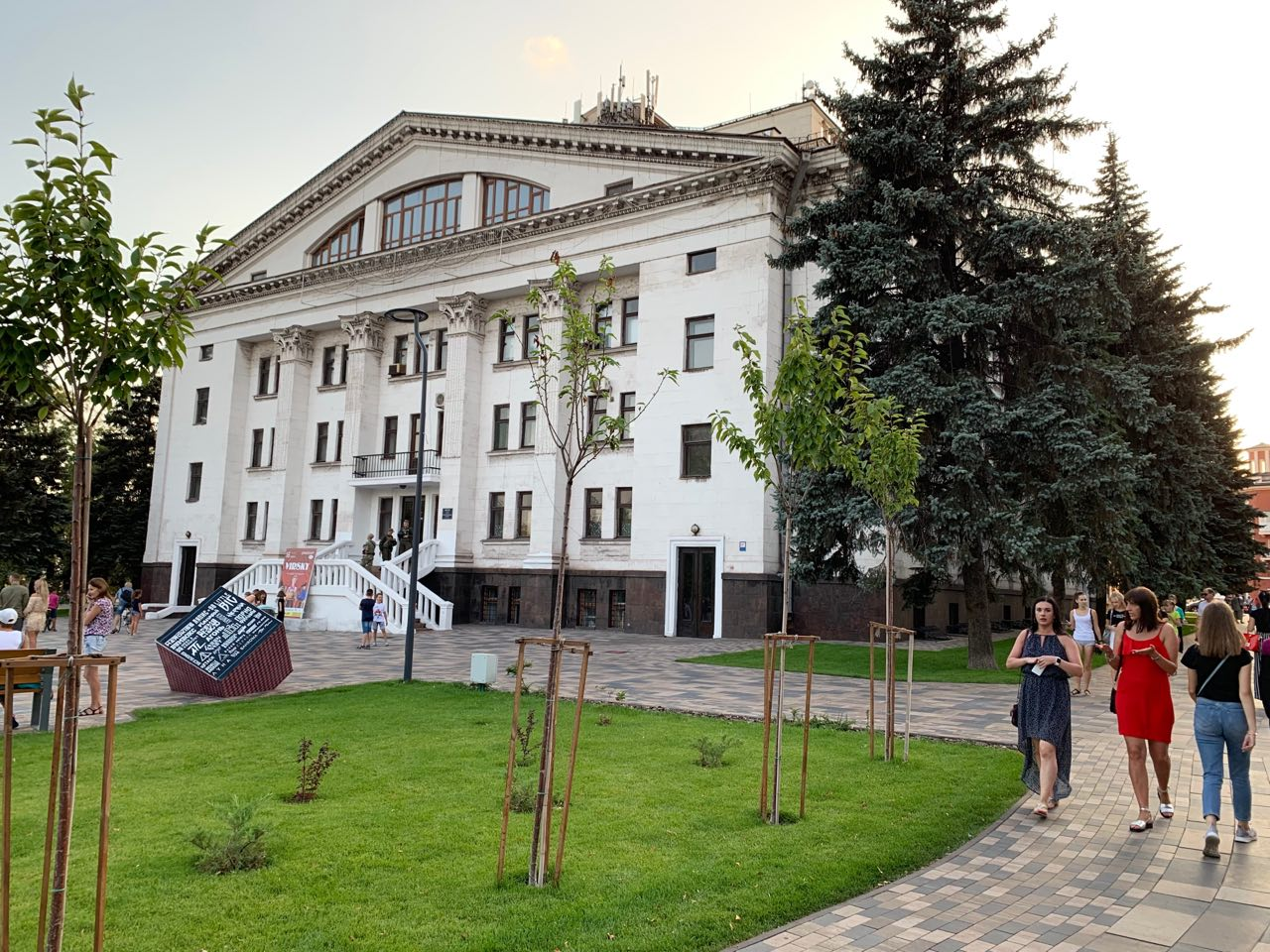
Donetsk Regional Theatre of Drama in Mariupol

=== Donetsk ===
- Donetsk State Academic Opera and Ballet Theatre named after A. Solovianenko
- Donetsk National Academic Ukrainian Musical and Drama Theatre
- Donetsk Academic Regional Puppet Theater

=== Mariupol ===
- Donetsk Regional Drama Theatre

=== Horlivka ===
- Horlivka Ukrainian State Drama Theater
- Horlivka City Puppet Theater

=== Makiivka ===
- Donetsk Regional Russian Theater for Young Spectators

== Zhytomyr Oblast ==
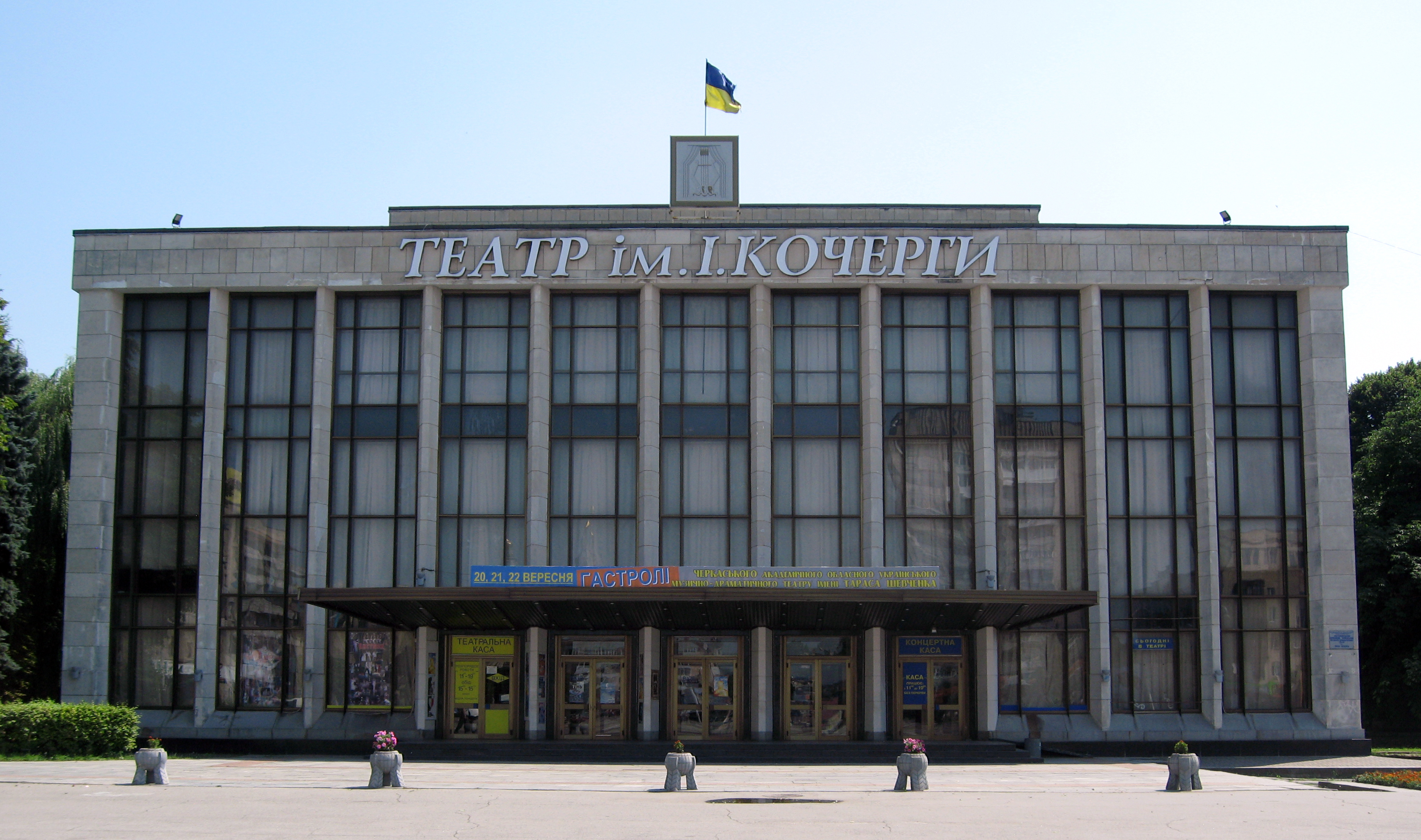
Zhytomyr Theater named after Ivan Kocherga

=== Zhytomyr ===
- Zhytomyr Theater named after Ivan Kocherga
- Zhytomyr Academic Regional Puppet Theater

=== Zviahel ===
- Zviahel People's Amateur Theater
- Zviahel People's Youth Theater

== Zakarpattia Oblast ==
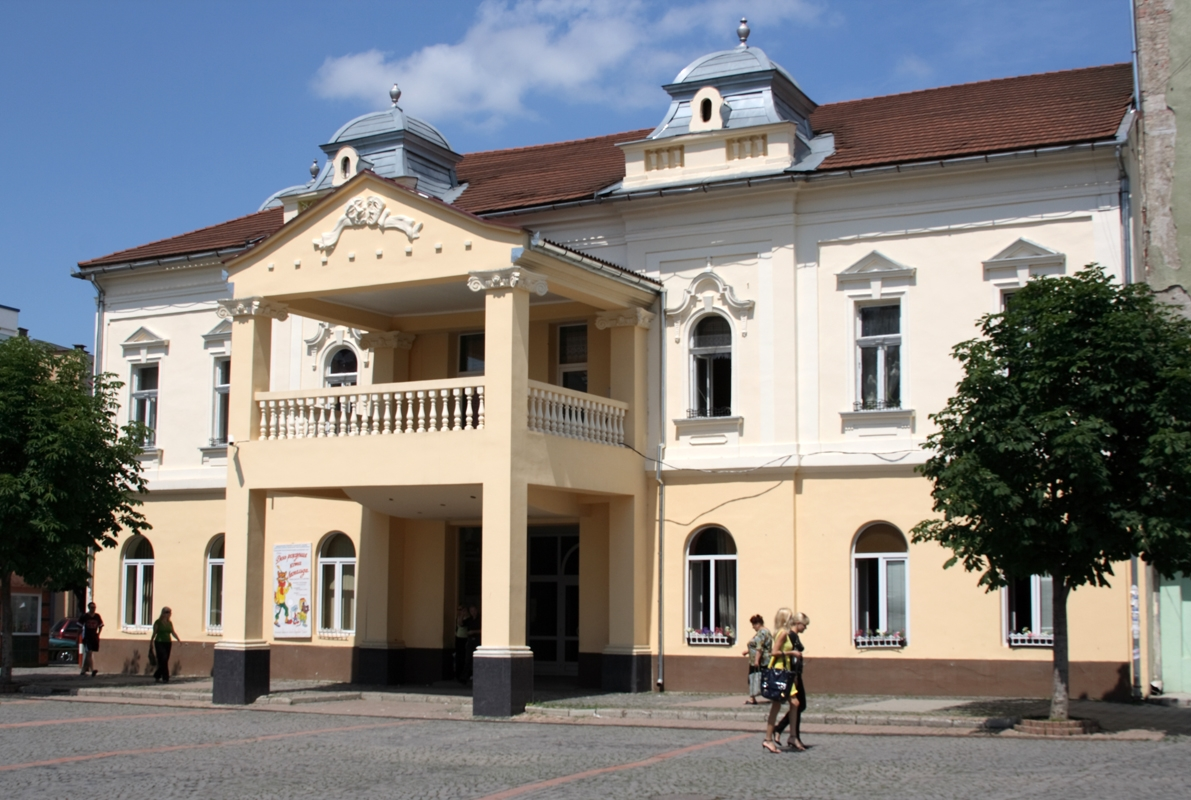
Mukachevo Drama Theater

=== Uzhhorod ===
- Zakarpatsky Academic Regional Ukrainian Music and Drama Theater
- Transcarpathian Regional Puppet Theater "Bavka"

=== Mukachevo ===
- Mukachevo Drama Theater

== Zaporizhzhia Oblast ==
=== Zaporizhzhia ===
- Zaporizhzhia Academic Regional Ukrainian Music and Drama Theater named after Volodymyr Magar
- Zaporizhzhia Academic Youth Theater
- Zaporizhzhia Regional Puppet Theater
- Zaporizhzhia Municipal Theater-Laboratory "VIE"
- Zaporizhzhia Municipal Dance Theater
- Zaporizhzhia Children's Theater "SVIYA"

== Ivano-Frankivsk Oblast ==
=== Horodenka ===
- Horodenka Theater SUCHASNYK

=== Ivano-Frankivsk ===
- Ivan Franko National Academic Music and Drama Theatre
- Ivano-Frankivsk Academic Regional Puppet Theater named after Mariika Pidhirianka

=== Kolomyia ===
- Kolomyia Academic Regional Ukrainian Drama Theater named after Ivan Ozarkevych

== Kyiv Oblast ==
=== Bila Tserkva ===
- Kyiv Academic Regional Music and Drama Theater named after P.K. Saksagansky

== Kirovohrad Oblast ==
=== Kropyvnytskyi ===
- Kirovohrad Academic Ukrainian Music and Drama Theater named after ML Kropyvnytskyi
- Kirovohrad Regional Academic Puppet Theater

== Luhansk Oblast ==
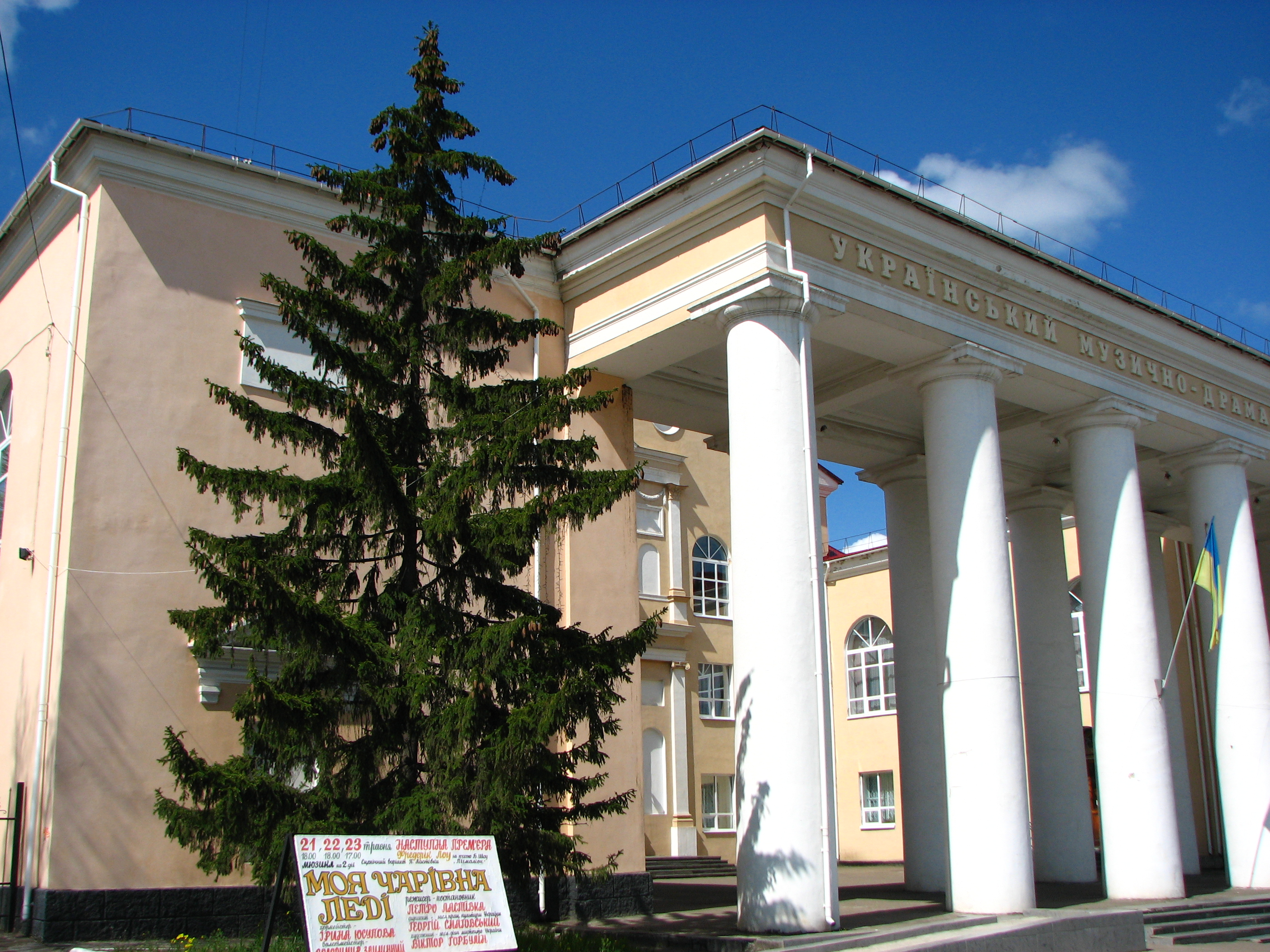
Luhansk Regional Academic Ukrainian Music and Drama Theater

=== Luhansk ===
- Luhansk Academic Regional Russian Drama Theater
- Luhansk Academic Regional Puppet Theater

=== Sievierodonetsk ===
- Luhansk Regional Academic Ukrainian Music and Drama Theater
- Severodonetsk City Drama Theater

=== Milove ===
- Luhansk Regional Cossack Equestrian Theater

== Lviv Oblast ==
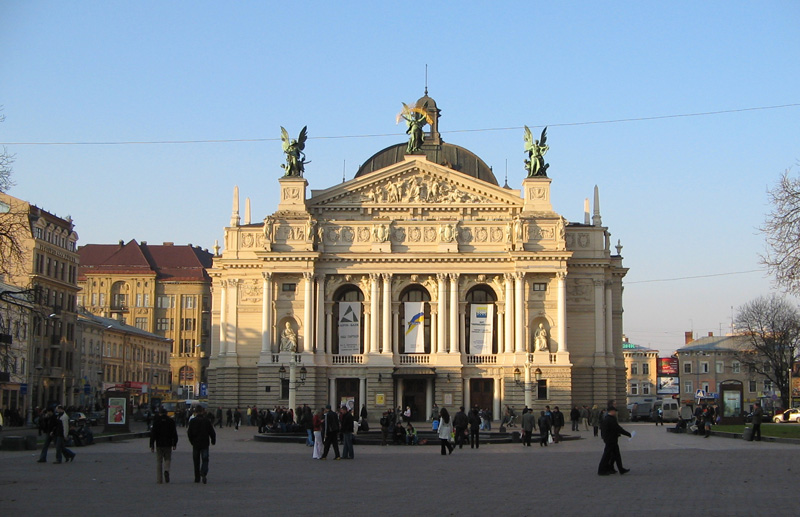
Lviv Theatre of Opera and Ballet

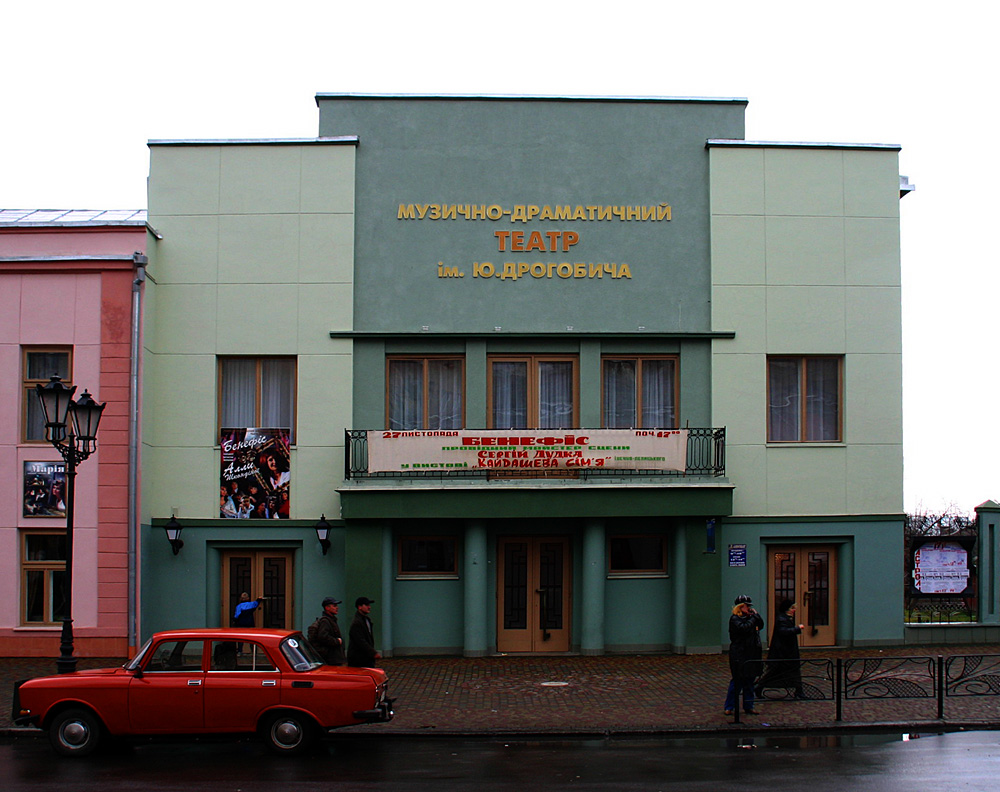
Lviv Regional Academic Music and Drama Theater named after Yuri Drohobych

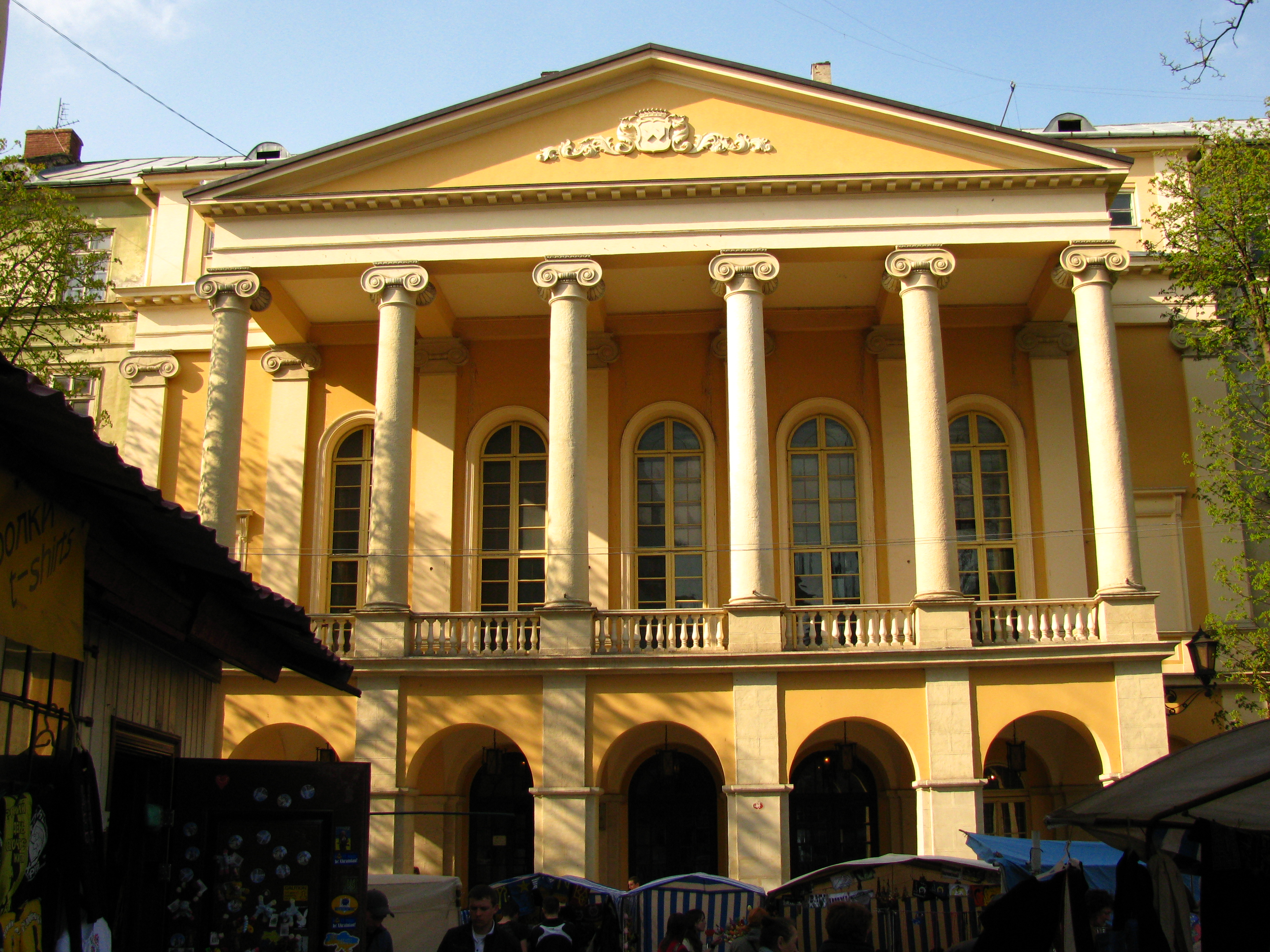
Maria Zankovetska Theatre

=== Lviv ===
- Lviv Theatre of Opera and Ballet
- Maria Zankovetska Theatre
- Les Kurbas Theatre
- Lviv Regional Puppet Theater
- Lviv Academic Drama Theater named after Lesia Ukrainka
- Lviv Academic Theater "Voskresinnia"
- First Ukrainian theater for children and youth
- Theater-studio "Pid mostom"
- "Ne zhurysʹ!" Theater
- Theater-studio "I Liudy, I Lialʹky"

=== Drohobych ===
- Lviv Regional Academic Music and Drama Theater named after Yuri Drohobych

=== Chervonohrad ===
- Chervonohrad Drama Theater named after Lesia Ukrainka
- Chervonohrad Theater-Studio "Fantasy"
- Chervonohrad Children's Theater "Fairy Tale"

== Mykolaiv Oblast ==
=== Mykolaiv ===
- Mykolaiv Academic Ukrainian Drama and Musical Comedy Theater
- Mykolaiv Academic Art Theatre of Drama
- Mykolaiv State Puppet Theatre

== Odesa Oblast ==
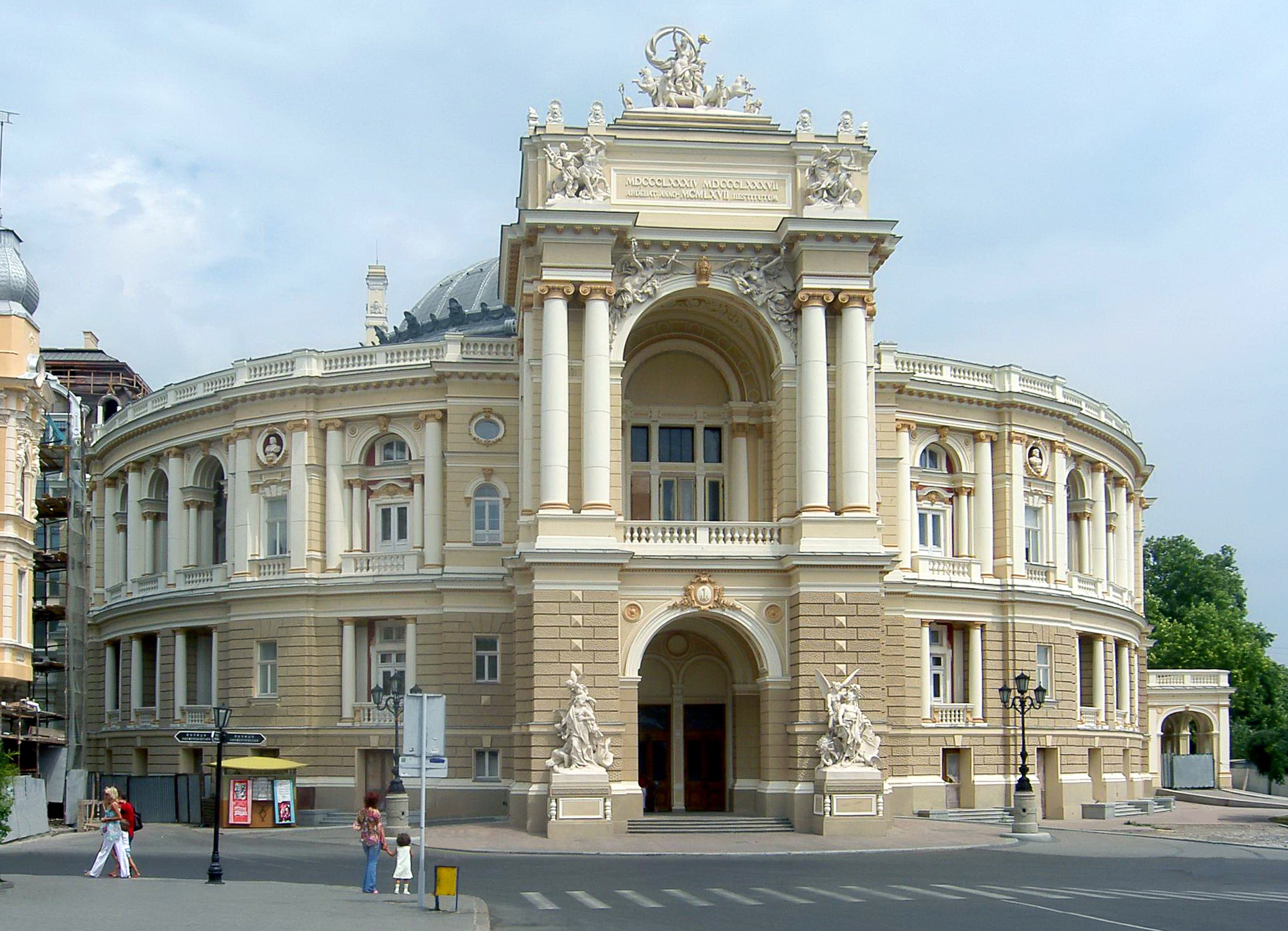
Odesa Opera and Ballet Theatre

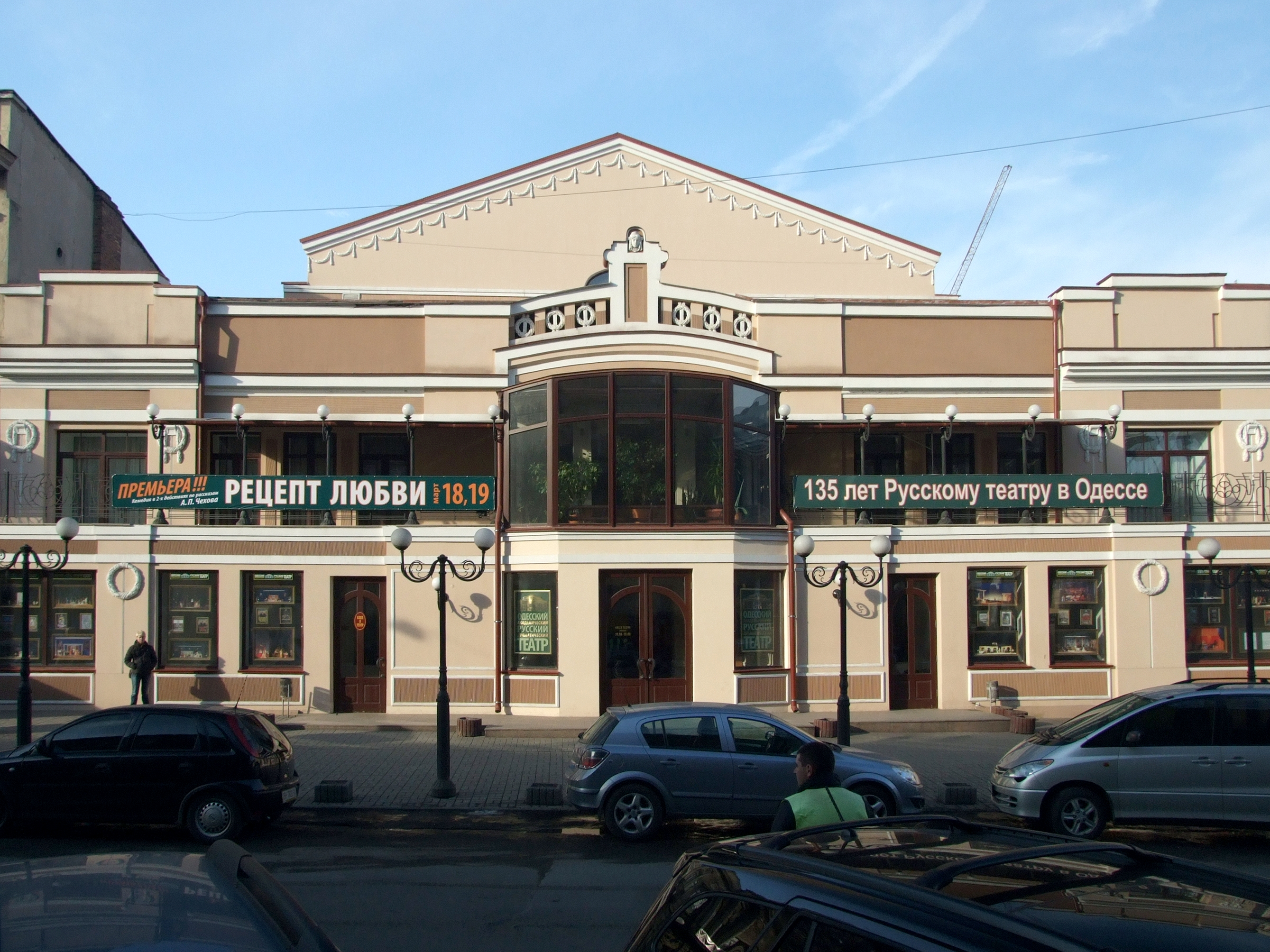
The Theatre building on Hretska Street

=== Odesa ===
- Odesa Opera and Ballet Theatre
- Odesa Academic Ukrainian Music and Drama Theater named after V. Vasylko
- Odesa Academic Theater of Musical Comedy named after M. Vodiany
- Odesa Regional Puppet Theater
- Odesa Oblast Academic Drama Theater
- Odesa Theater for Young Spectators named after M. Ostrovsky
- Theater on Tea House Street

== Poltava Oblast ==
=== Полтава ===
- Poltava Academic Regional Ukrainian Music and Drama Theater named after Mykola Gogol
- Poltava Academic Regional Puppet Theater

== Rivne Oblast ==
=== Rivne ===
- Rivne Regional Academic Ukrainian Music and Drama Theater
- Rivne Academic Regional Puppet Theater

== Sumy Oblast ==
=== Sumy ===
- Sumy National Academic Drama and Musical Comedy Theater named after M.S. Shchepkin
- Sumy Regional Theater for Children and Youth

== Ternopil Oblast ==
=== Ternopil ===
- Ternopil Academic Regional Drama Theater named after T.G. Shevchenko
- Ternopil Regional Academic Actor and Puppet Theatre

=== Pidhaitsi ===
- Pidhaietskyi Amateur Theater

=== Chortkiv ===
- People's Amateur Theater

=== Kopychyntsi ===
- Kopychyntsi National Theater named after Bohdan Lepky

=== Kremenets ===
- People's Amateur Theater at the House of Culture

=== Buchach ===
- People's Amateur Theater at the House of Culture

=== Nove Selo ===
- People's Amateur Theater at the House of Culture

=== Terebovlia ===
- People's Amateur Theater of Miniatures of Terebovlia Higher School of Culture

=== Shumsk ===
- People's Amateur Theater of the Shumsky Regional House of Culture

=== Golgocha ===
- Golgochansky People's Amateur Theater Collective

== Kharkiv Oblast ==
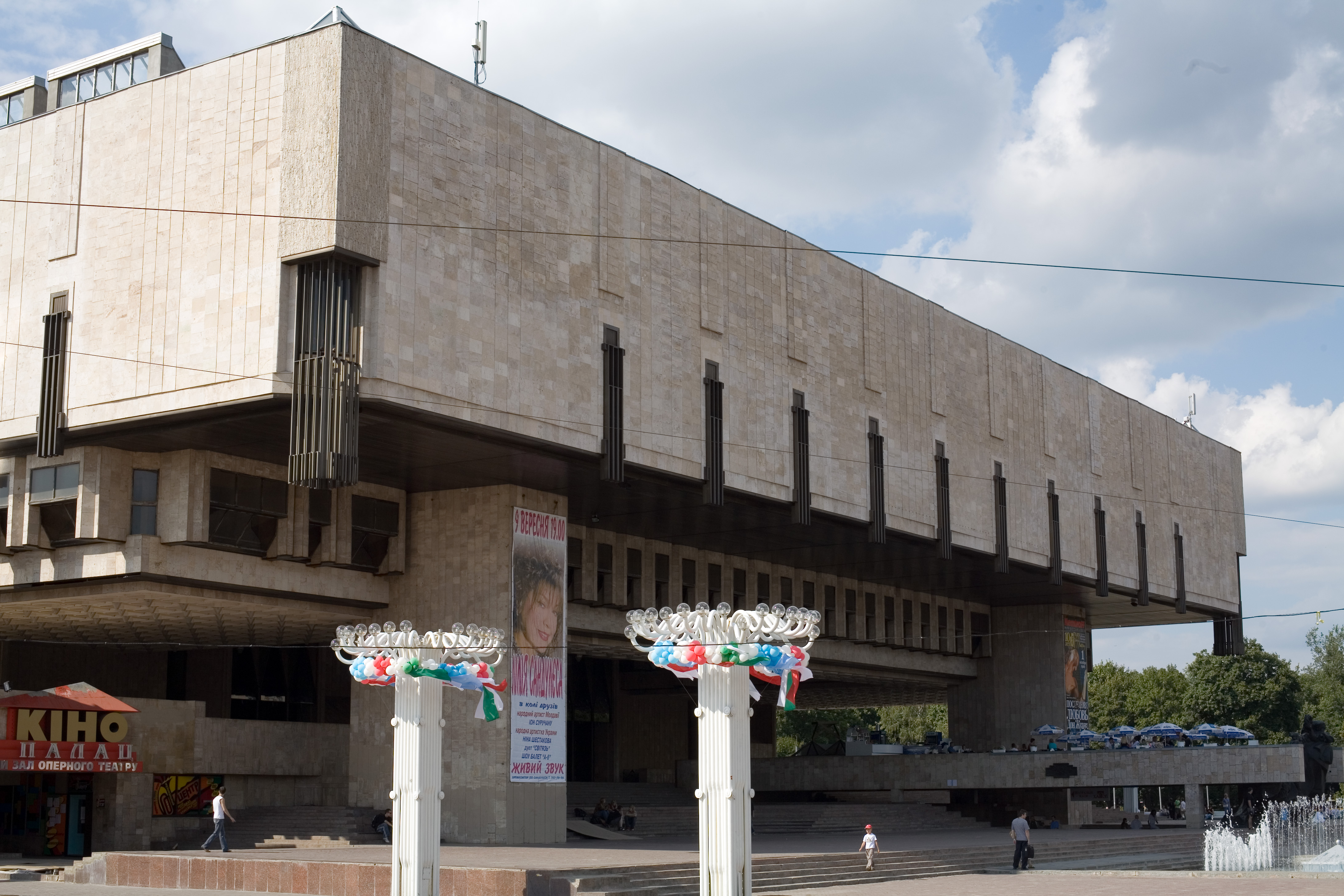
Kharkiv National Academic Opera and Ballet Theater named after Mykola Lysenko

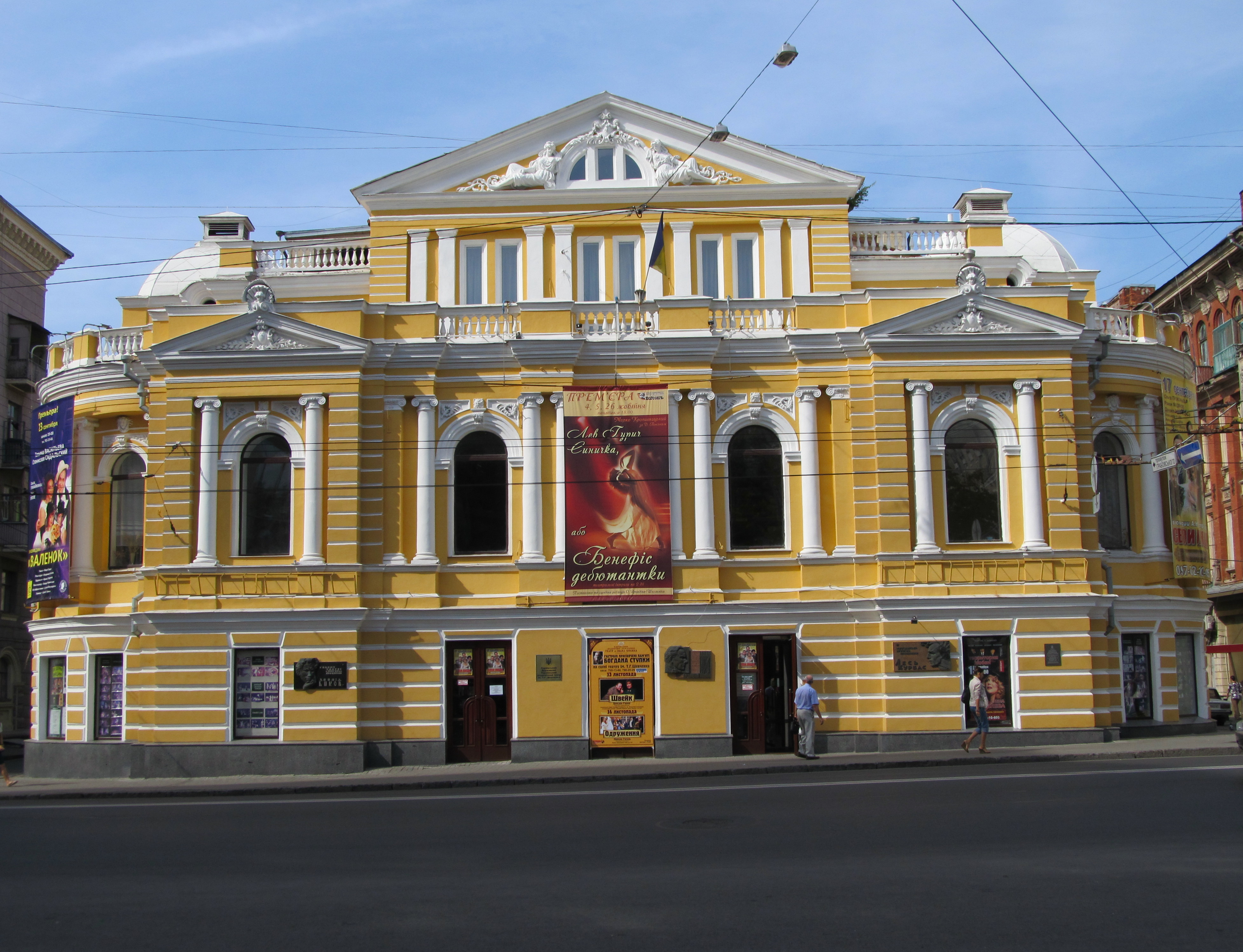
Kharkiv Ukrainian Drama Theatre

=== Kharkiv ===
- Kharkiv National Academic Opera and Ballet Theater named after Mykola Lysenko
- Kharkiv Ukrainian Drama Theatre
- Kharkiv State Academic Drama Theater
- Kharkiv State Academic Puppet Theater named after V.A. Afanasiev
- Kharkiv Academic Theater of Musical Comedy
- Kharkiv Theater for Children and Youth
- Theatre 19
- Kharkiv Theater "P.S."
- Maria Kovalenko Theater
- Theater Na Zhukah
- "Pari-Komik"
- New Theater
- Publicist Theater
- Amadeus Theater
- "Aparte" Theater
- Theater for people
- Kotelok Theater
- "Maybe" Theatre
- Poetry and music theater
- "Del Piero" French Comedy Theater
- "Stupeni" Theater-Studio
- Neft Theater

== Kherson Oblast ==
=== Kherson ===
- Kherson Regional Academic Music and Drama Theater named after Mykola Kulish
- Kherson Regional Puppet Theater

== Khmelnytskyi Oblast ==
=== Khmelnytskyi ===
- Khmelnytski Regional Ukrainian Music and Drama Theater named after Mykhailo Starytsky
- Khmelnytski Academic Regional Puppet Theater
- Khmelnytsky Monotheater "Kut"

== Cherkasy Oblast ==
=== Cherkasy ===
- Cherkasy Academic Regional Ukrainian Music and Drama Theater named after Taras Shevchenko
- Cherkasy Academic Puppet Theater

== Chernivtsi Oblast ==
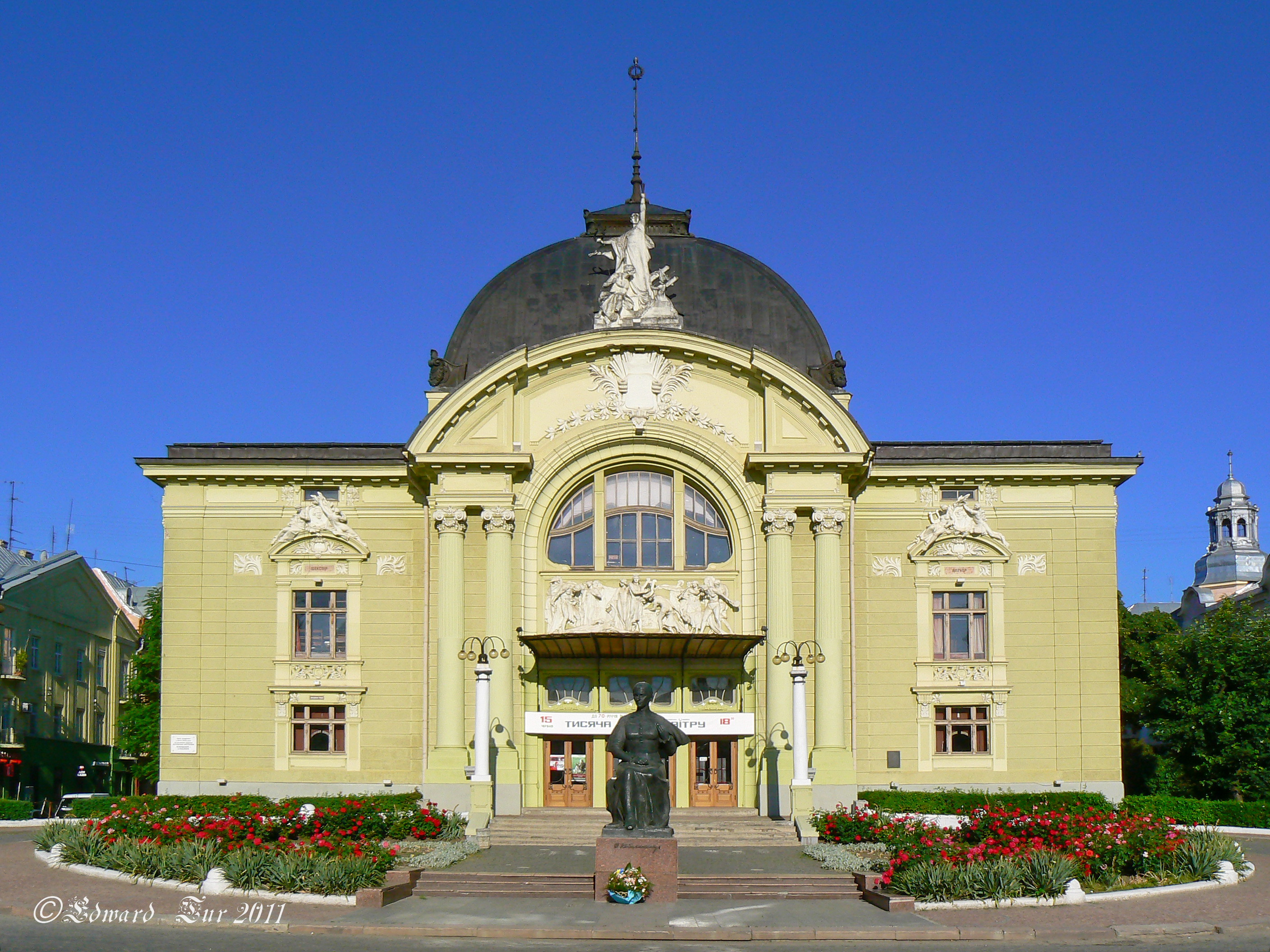
Olha Kobylianska Chernivtsi Music and Drama Theater

=== Chernivtsi ===
- Olha Kobylianska Chernivtsi Music and Drama Theater
- Chernivtsi Academic Regional Puppet Theater

== Chernihiv Oblast ==
=== Chernihiv ===
- Chernihiv Regional Academic Ukrainian Music and Drama Theater named after Taras Shevchenko
- Chernihiv Regional Puppet Theater named after Dovzhenko
- Chernihiv Regional Youth Theater

=== Nizhyn ===
- Nizhyn Academic Ukrainian Drama Theater named after M. Kotsyubynsky

== See also ==
- Theater in Ukraine
- Theatre of Coryphaei
