= Harri Logvyn =

Ukrainian violinist (1946–2001)

Harri Logvyn Гаррі Логвін
- Born: Harri Borysovych Lohvin; 15 May 1946 (age 80); Kharkiv, Kharkiv Oblast, Ukrainian SSR, Soviet Union
- Died: 1 July 2001 (aged 55) Dnipropetrovsk, Dnipropetrovsk Oblast, Ukraine
- Education: Kharkiv National Kotlyarevsky University of Arts
- Occupation: Violinist
- Instrument: Violin
- Years active: 1969–2001
- Awards: Order of Merit; People's Artist of Ukraine

Harri Borysovych Lohvin (Ukrainian: Гаррі Борисович Логвін), known professionally as Harri Logvyn (14 May 1946 – 1 July 2001), was a Soviet and Ukrainian violinist and teacher.

Born in Kharkiv, he trained at the Kharkiv Music College and the Kharkiv National Kotlyarevsky University of Arts, before beginning his career by working at the Kharkiv State Academic Opera and Ballet Theatre named after Mykola Lysenko from 1964 to 1974. At the theatre, he served as the concertmaster of the opera studio orchestra. In 1974, he moved to Dnipropetrovsk to become the concertmaster of the Dnipro Opera and Ballet Theatre, which he served as until 1999. In addition, he taught at the Dnipro Academy of Music and Children's Musical School No. 3. He also performed with the ensemble Kozatski Shliakhy and co-founded and directed the chamber orchestra Pory Roku.

== Biography ==
Logvyn was born on 14 May 1946 in the city of Kharkiv, which was then part of the Ukrainian SSR in the Soviet Union (now Ukraine). His mother was a ballerina who graduated from the Kyiv State Choreographic College before moving to Kharkiv. In 1964 he graduated from the Music College in Kharkiv, where he was part of the violin class of S. Farberov. He then attended the Kharkiv National Kotlyarevsky University of Arts, graduating in 1970 as part of the class of R. Klymentska.

In 1964, he started working as an orchestra artist at the Kharkiv State Academic Opera and Ballet Theatre named after Mykola Lysenko, where he performed until 1974. In addition, starting in 1969, he was the concertmaster of the opera studio orchestra simultaneously with his studies. In 1974, he moved to Dnipropetrovsk after receiving an invitation to work as a concertmaster of the orchestra for the Dnipro Opera and Ballet Theatre. He worked there up until 1999. In addition, upon his move, he began working as a teacher for the violin classes at the Dnipro Academy of Music and at the Children's Music School No. 3.

In 1991, after the collapse of the Soviet Union he became a member of the ensemble "Kozatski Shliakhy" (Cossack Ways) at the Dnipropetrovsk Opera and Ballet Theater, which helped popularize Ukrainian national music. He also, in 1994, became the co-founder, artistic director, and soloist of the chamber orchestra "Pory Roku" (The Seasons). The Seasons toured across Ukraine and CIS, and released three musical CDs. As a solo artist, he recorded the disc "Spring" in 1997, and toured France, Italy, Spain, Israel, and Lebanon.

== Personal life ==
Harri was married to another musician, who was the daughter of a Kyiv composer, Isaac Sirota. Harri had one son, Dmytro, who later followed in his father's footsteps and became a musician, heading The Seasons.

On 1 July 2001, Harri died in Dnipropetrovsk.

== Awards and honours ==
In 1998, he was awarded the Order of Merit, third class. The following year, in 1999, he was awarded the title of People's Artist of Ukraine.

== Legacy ==
In 2001, the "Pory Roku" orchestra was named after Lohvyn. In Dnipro (the former Dnipropetrovsk), a memorial plaque was installed on the building where he lived.

Since his death, the Dnipro City Council has awarded a mayor's scholarship for students in violin at primary specialized art educational institutions for achievements in the field of musical art in addition to high levels of academic achievement, named after him. Awardees were paid in the amount of 500 hryvnias per month, until this amount was tripled starting in 2025 to 1,500 hryvnias. In 2022, there was a total of 5 recipients for the year.
