= Neft Theater =

Neft Theater is an alternative independent theater based in Kharkiv since 2018. "Neft" is an open theatrical platform, where there is no fixed troupe and classical canons. Actors, directors, musicians, choreographers, and artists can share their ideas at "Neft," gather a team and implement a new theater project. A performance of Anton and Natasha in Search of the Meaning of Life as part of Parade-fest. A theatrical and urban festival based on the idea of rethinking and shaping the image of Kharkiv through art. Ukraine, Kharkiv, 2018.
