= Dnipro Academy of Music =

Institute of higher education in Ukraine

Coordinates: 48.46544°N 35.06074°E

- Dnіprovs’ka akademіja muziki
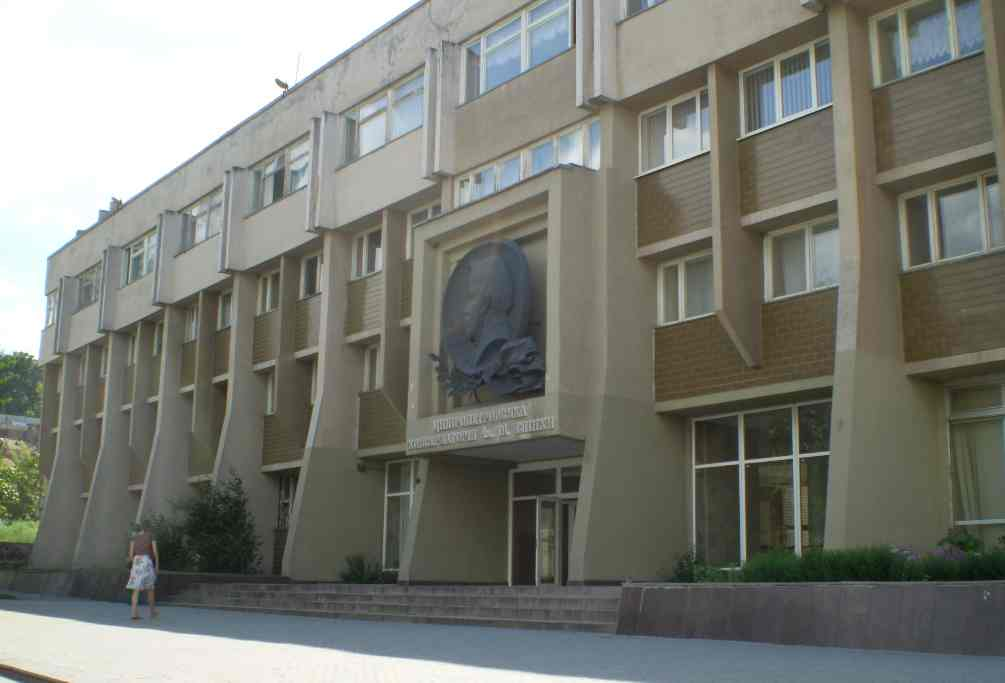
- Other names: Dnipro Conservatory
- Type: Public
- Established: 1926
- Location: Dnipro, Ukraine
- Website: Official website

The Dnipro Academy of Music, also called the Dnipro Conservatory since 2006, is a musical university in Dnipro, Ukraine, which was founded in 1926. In 2006, the academy offered bachelor's degrees and equivalents in several musical fields. According to Ukrainian national rankings, the academy is listed as in the top five higher educational institutions in the country.

== History ==
The Academy is one of the oldest music schools in Ukraine, tracing its roots to music classes taught in Dnipro as far back as 1898. The school began to operate in 1901, and the Academy was officially founded in 1926. In 2006, the Academy officially received Higher Education Institution status from the government of Ukraine.
