= Kyiv Academic Theatre of Ukrainian Folklore =

Theatre in Kyiv

Coordinates: 50°25′50.55″N 30°35′46.31″E

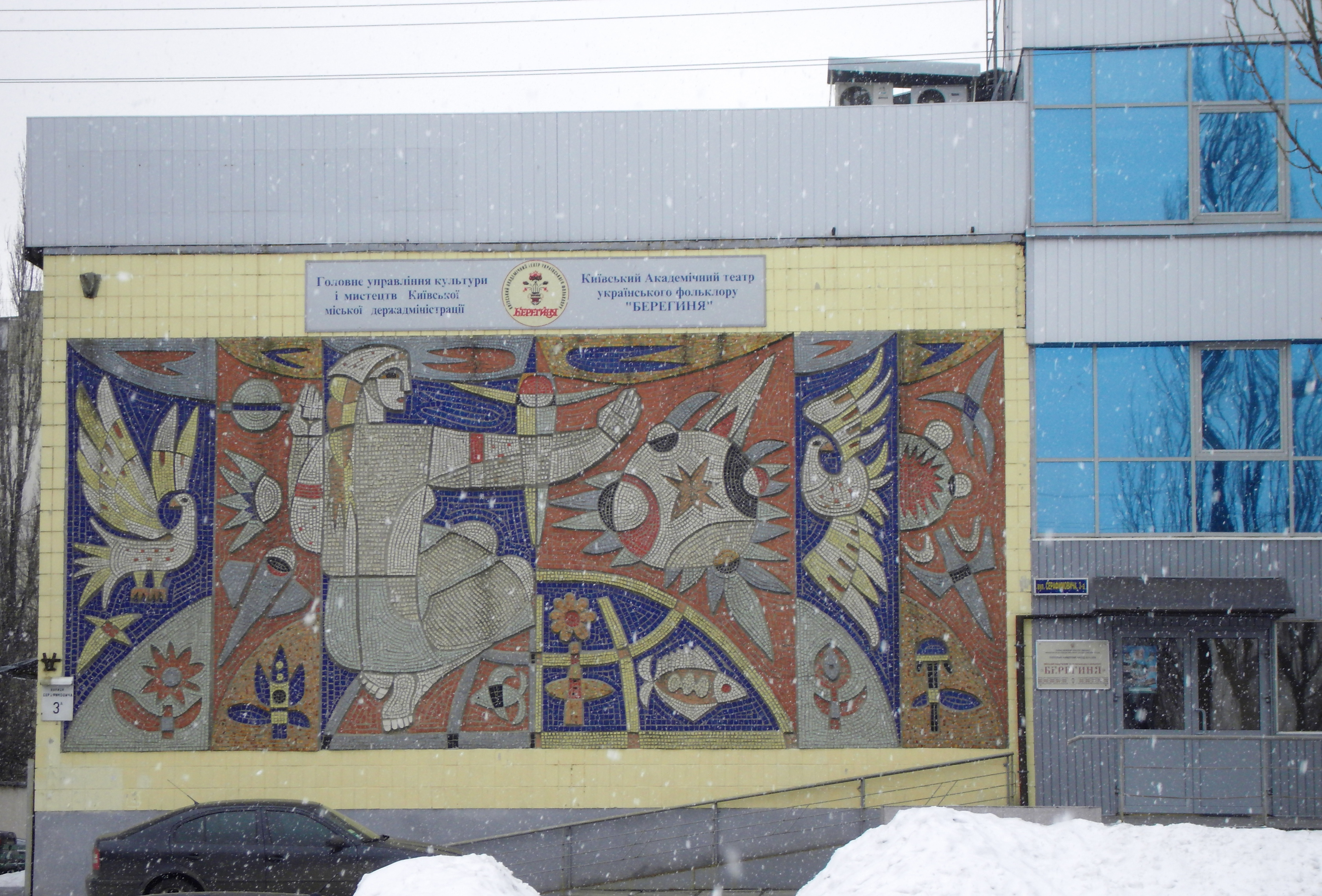
Kyiv Academic Theatre of Ukrainian Folklore

The Kyiv Academic Theatre of Ukrainian Folklore (Berehynia) (Ukrainian: Київський академічний театр українського фольклору «Берегиня») is a theatre in Kyiv in Ukraine. It was founded in 1983.
