= Dnipro Opera and Ballet Theatre =

Theatre in Dnipro, Ukraine

Dnipro Academic Opera and Ballet Theatre
- Дніпровський академічний театр опери та балету
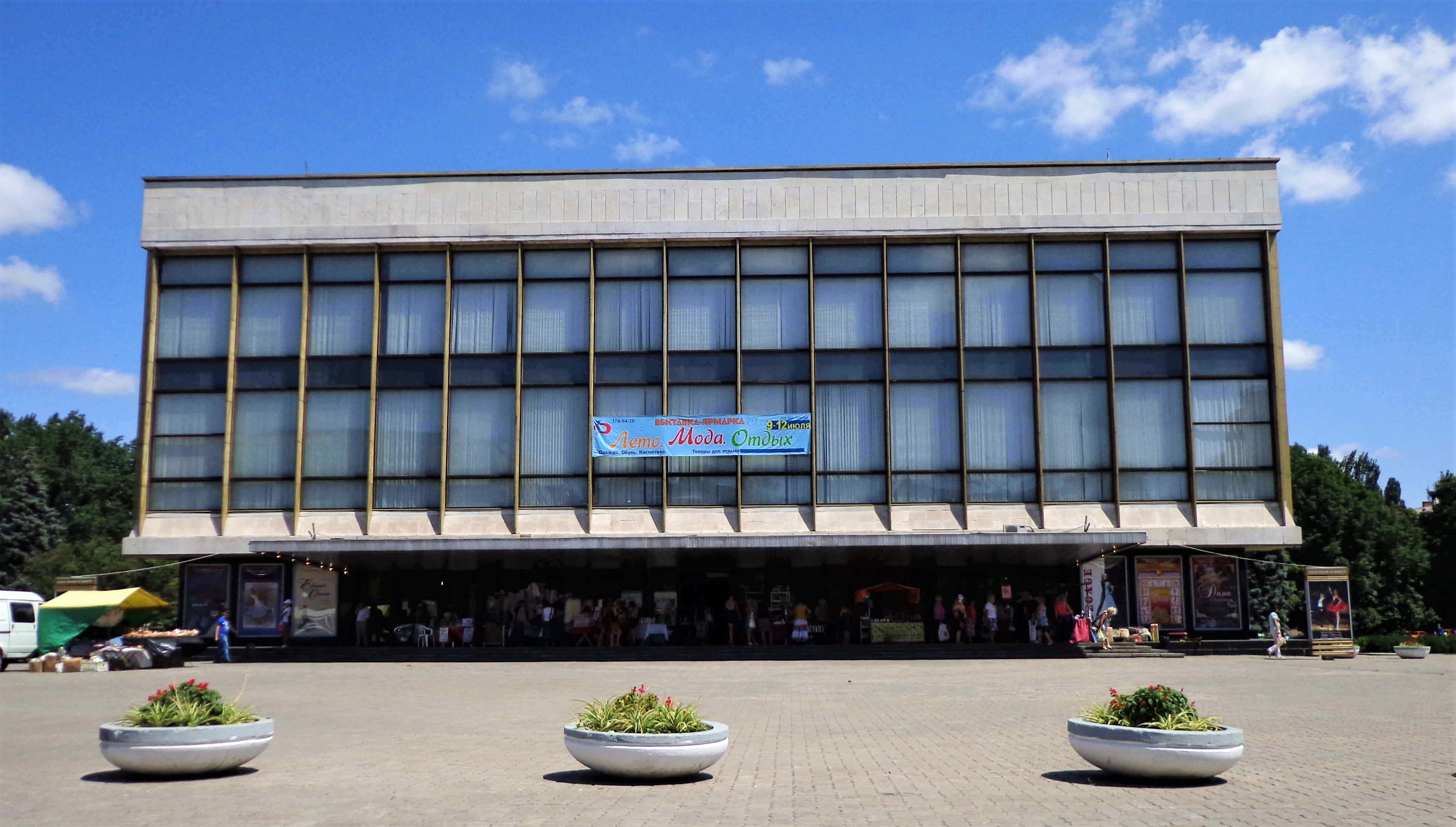
- The theatre in 2013
- Interactive map of Dnipro Academic Opera and Ballet Theatre
- Address: Dmytro Yavornytsky Ave; Dnipro; Ukraine
- Location: Dnipro, Dnipropetrovsk Oblast, Ukraine
- Coordinates: 48.4701°N 35.0381°E
- Capacity: 1148
- Type: opera house

Construction
- Opened: 1931
- Reopened: 1974

Website
- www.opera-ballet.com.ua

Dnipro Academic Opera and Ballet Theatre (Ukrainian: Дніпровський академічний театр опери та балету, romanized: Dniprovskyi akademichnyi teatr opery ta baletu) is an opera house in Dnipro.

== History ==
The first opera house in Dnipropetrovsk was opened in 1931 as the Dnipropetrovsk Workers' Opera House. In 1934–1937, Arsenko Arsen Dionysovych performed there. With the beginning of the Second World War, the company was evacuated to Krasnoyarsk, where the Dnieper Opera was merged with the Odesa troupe. The opera house was revived three decades later, on August 31, 1973, when the Council of Ministers of the Ukrainian SSR approved the idea of creating the Dnipropetrovsk Opera and Ballet Theatre.

The modern building was built on the site of a park. The architects based their design on the Zhytomyr Music and Drama Theatre, built in 1966, but both the exterior and interior design has Dnieper Opera has unique features. A feature of the theatre's square, designed by architect Pavel Nirinberg, was the light and music fountain 'Muse' by the sculptor Yuri Pavlov.

In 2017, ballet dancer and choreographer Dmytro Omelchenko won the AF Shekera Prize for staging the modern ballet Carmen & Jose. As of the beginning of 2020, the theater's repertoire included 18 operas, 18 ballets, 8 operettas and other musicals.

== Gallery ==
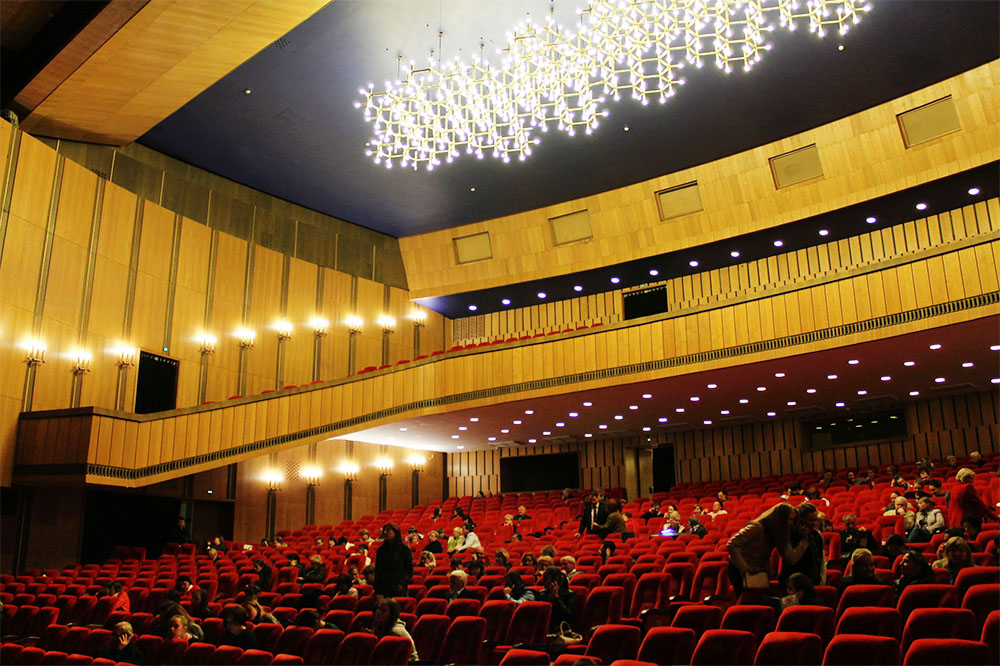
Dnipro Opera Hall

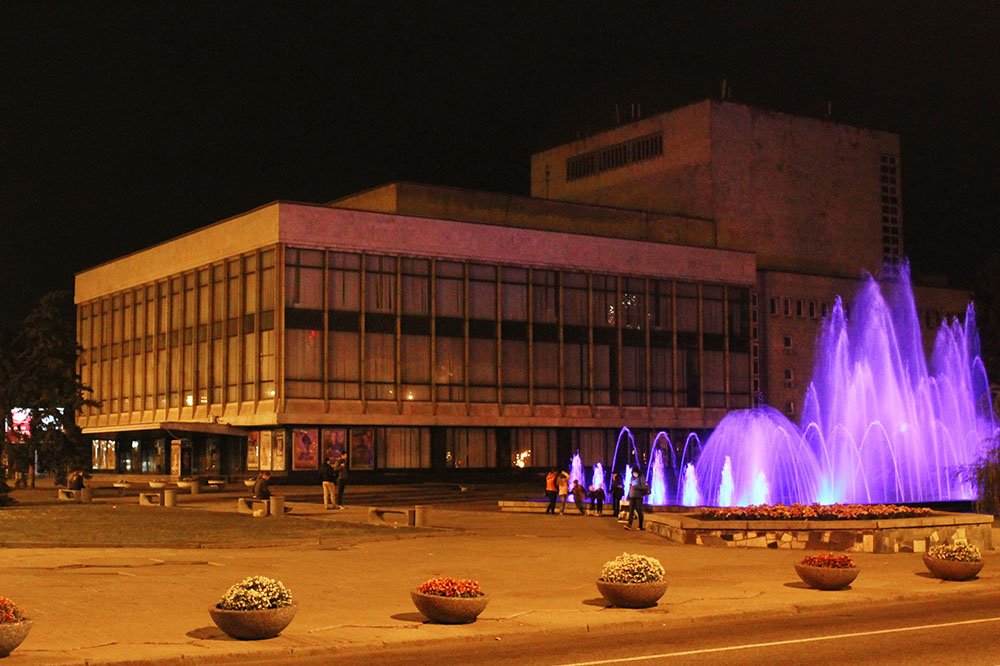
The theatre and fountain at night

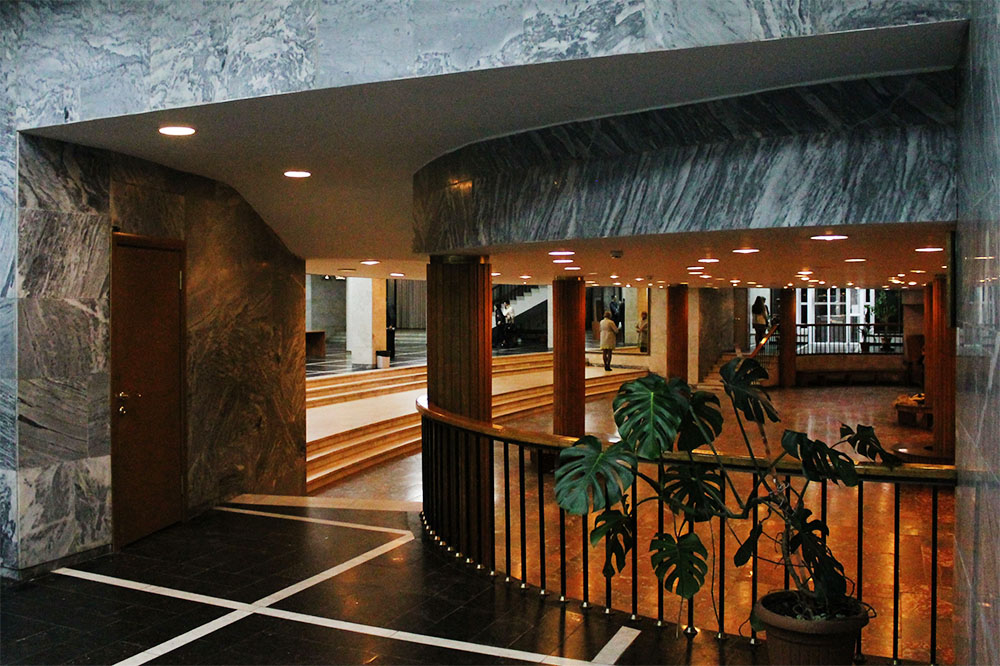
Theater Lobby

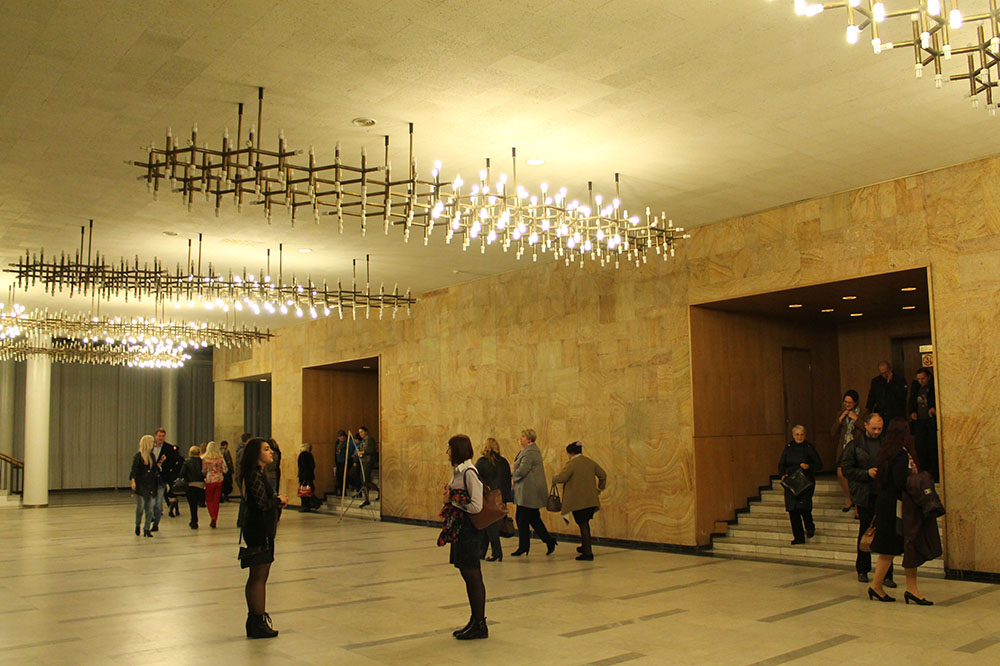
Second floor foyer

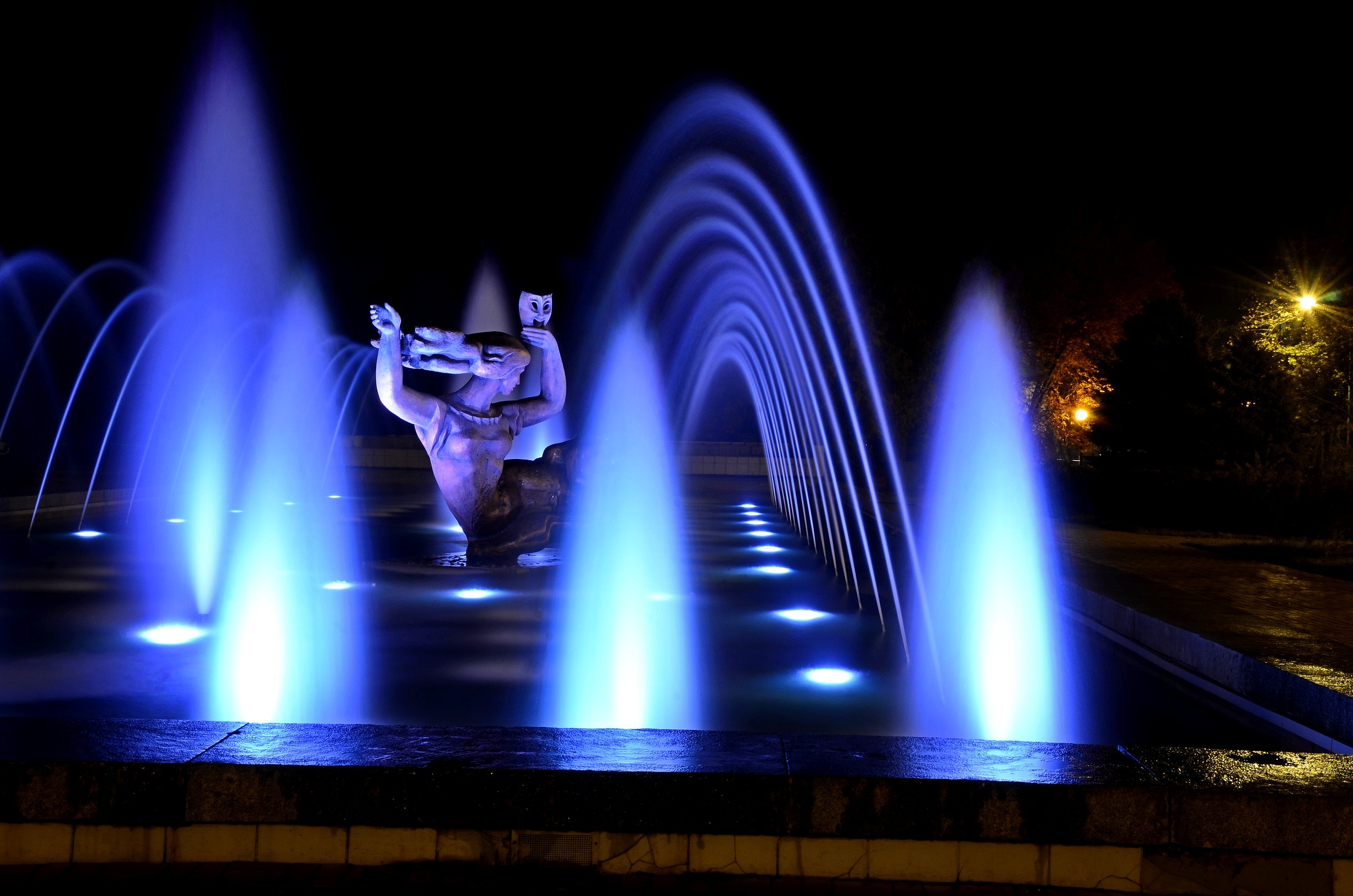
Opera Theatre Fountain
