= Kharkiv State Academic Opera and Ballet Theatre named after Mykola Lysenko =

Coordinates: 49.9991°N 36.2323°E

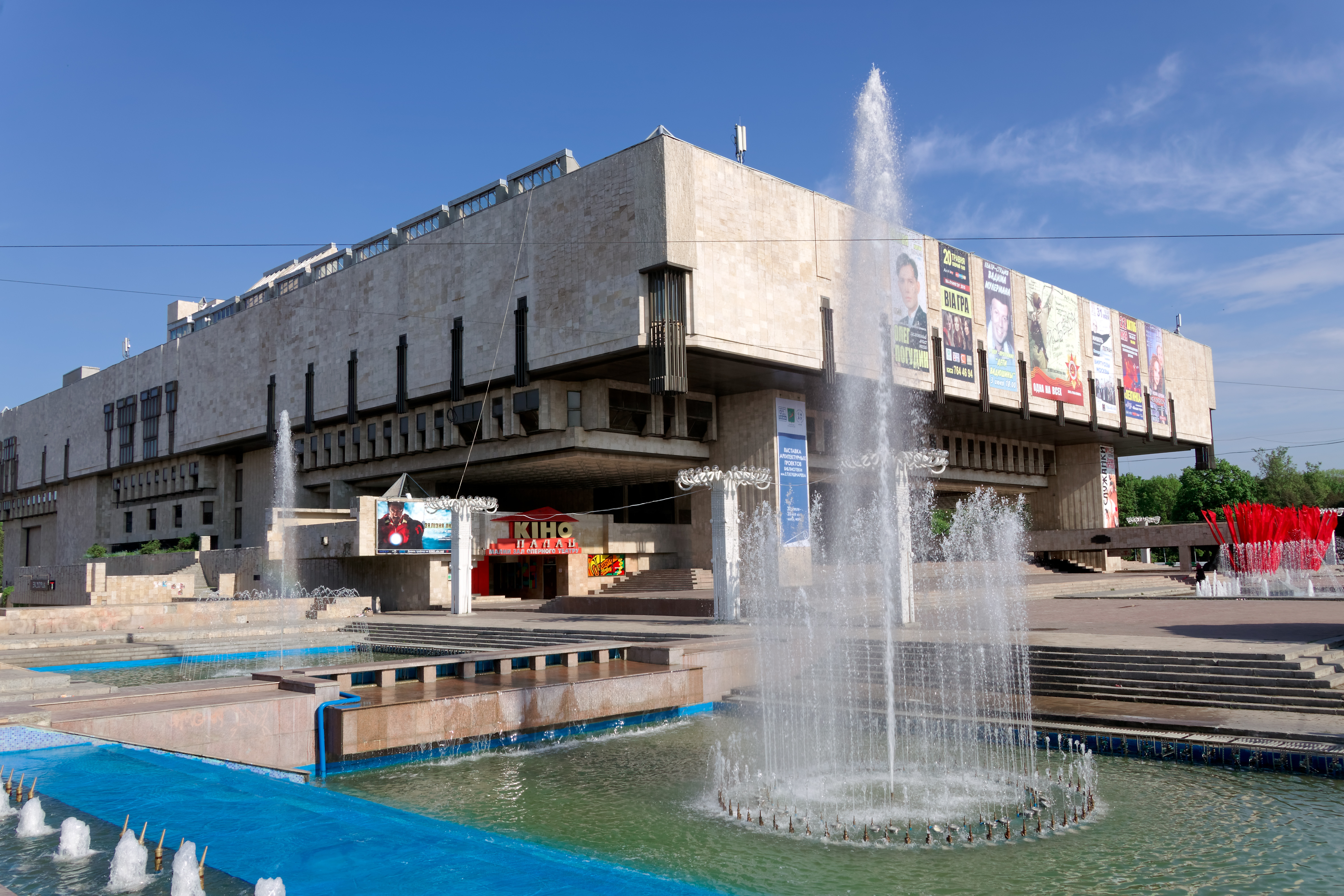
Kharkiv National Academic Opera and Ballet Theatre in 2010

The Kharkiv National Academic Opera and Ballet Theatre named after Mykola Lysenko is a theater in Kharkiv, Ukraine. The postmodern theater building was built in 1991 and features tufa tiles.

Notable performances at the venue include a 2019 production of the ballet Swan Lake, choreographed by Johan Nus, which used 42 tons of water. On December 23, 2020, the opera house was the site of the funeral for Kharkiv mayor Hennadii Kernes.

A student-led study at the Kharkiv School of Architecture found that the theater is considered a "community hub" and that the exterior is popular with skateboarders.

== Russo-Ukrainian War ==
The theatre was reportedly heavily damaged and possibly destroyed in March 2022 during the Battle of Kharkiv (2022) in the ongoing 2022 Russian invasion of Ukraine when Russian forces attacked Freedom Square. According to Ukrainian sources, no significant damage was suffered by the building, only a number of glass doors and windows were damaged.

== Gallery ==
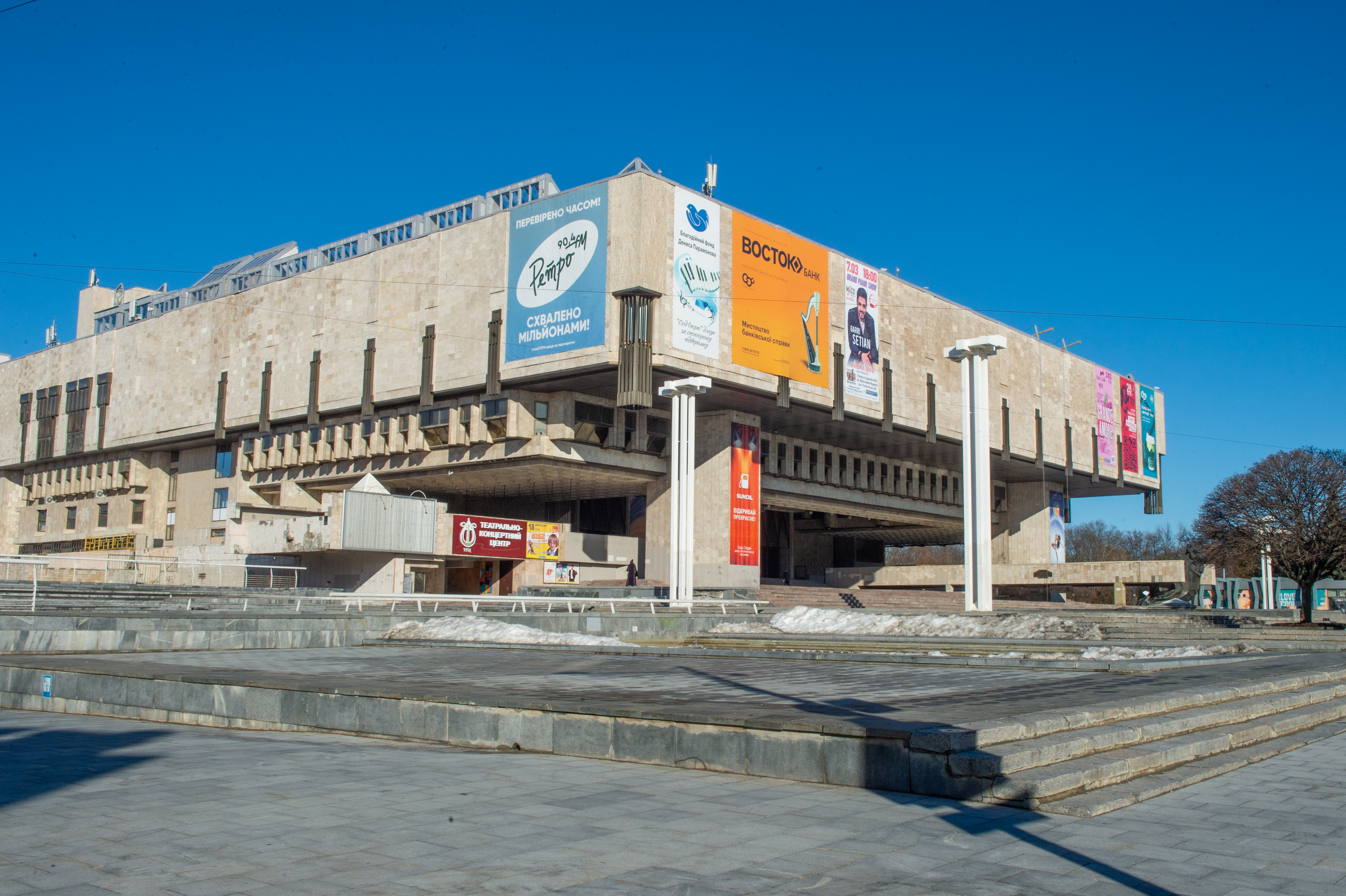
Exterior of the Kharkiv National Academic Opera and Ballet Theatre on February 20, 2022

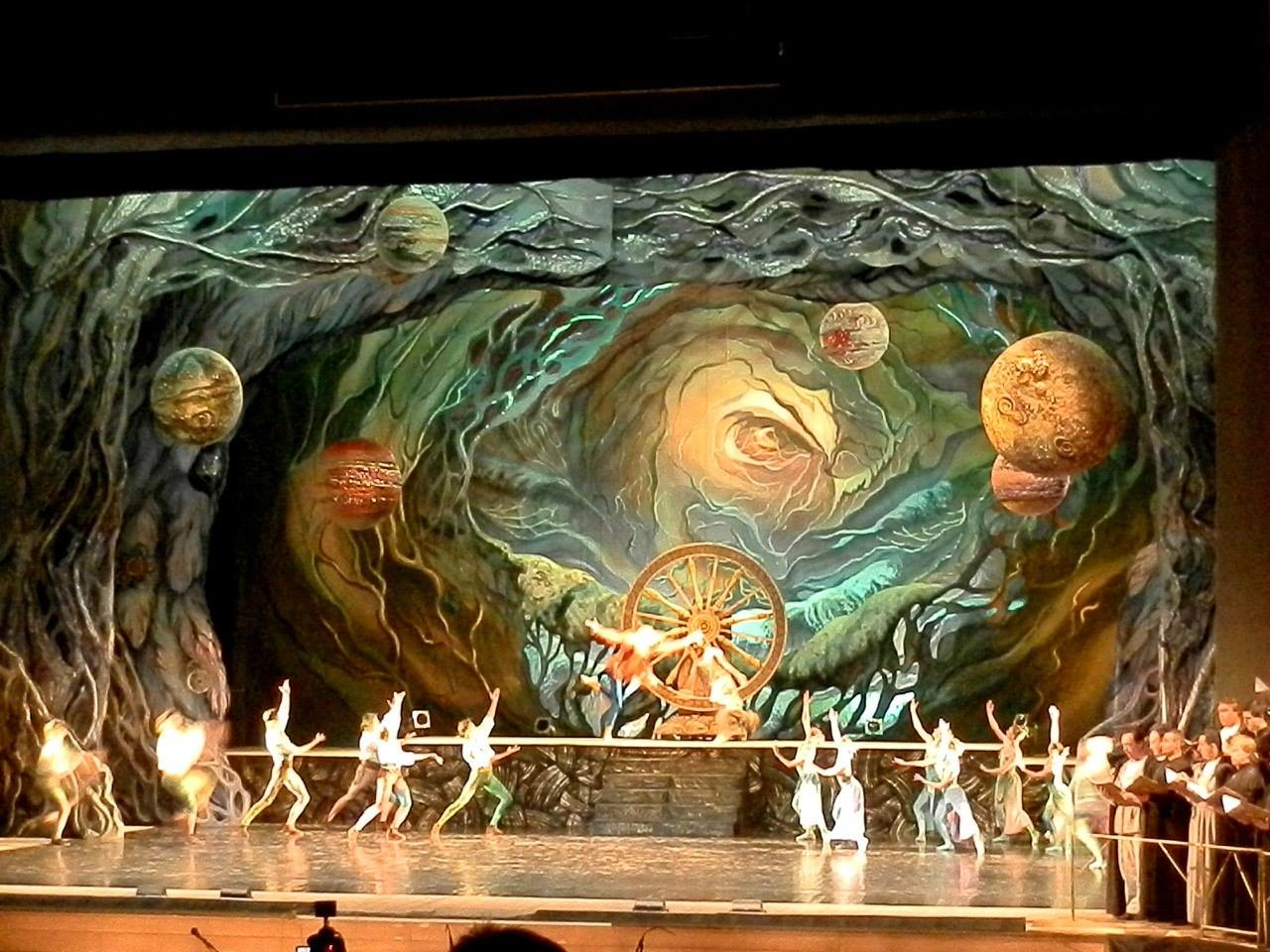
A performance of Carmina Burana at the venue

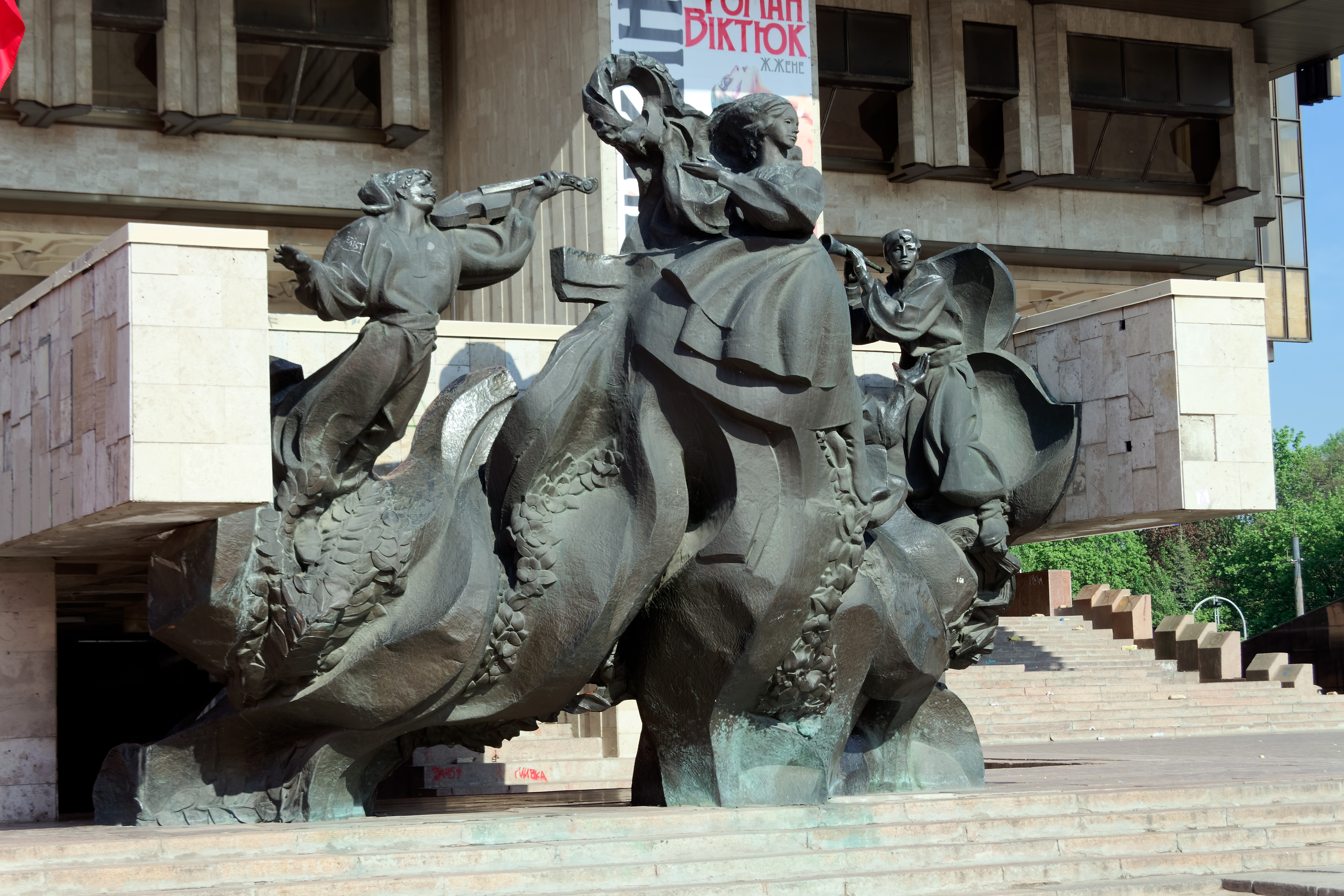
Sculpture in front of the opera house

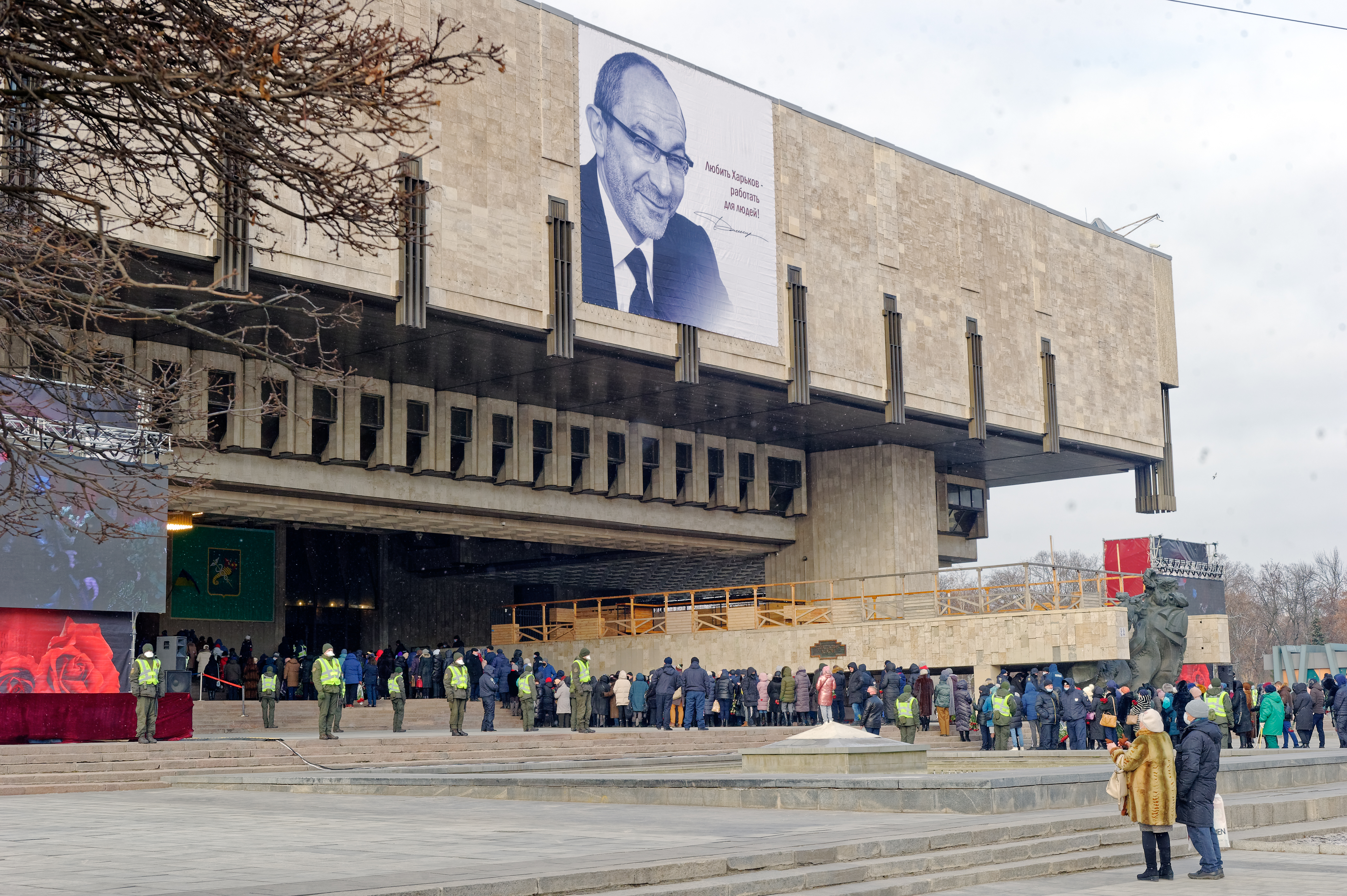
Funeral of Hennadii Kernes

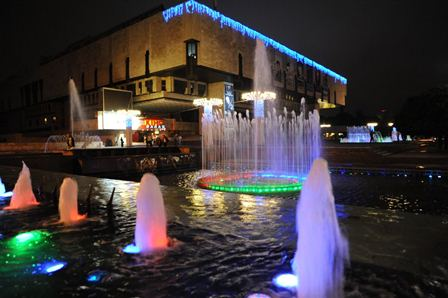
Fountains at the opera house

== See also ==
- Union for the Freedom of Ukraine trial
