= Lists of singers =

These are lists of singers.

== By nationality ==
- List of Afghan singers
- List of Albanian singers
- List of American singers
- List of Australian singers
- List of Austrian singers
- List of Azerbaijani singers
- List of Bahamian singers
- List of Barbadian singers
- List of Belarusian singers
- List of Bosniak singers
- List of Bulgarian singers
- List of Burundian singers
- List of Cambodian singers
- List of Cameroonian singers
- List of Canadian singers
- List of Croatian singers
- List of Cuban singers
- List of Danish singers
- List of Democratic Republic of the Congo singers
- List of Dominican singers
- List of Dutch singers
- List of Ecuadorian singers
- List of Eritrean singers
- List of Filipino singers
- List of Finnish singers
- List of French singers
- List of Icelandic singers
- List of Indonesian singers
- List of Iranian singers
- List of Jamaican singers
- List of Japanese singers
- List of Latvian singers
- List of Lithuanian singers
- List of Luxembourgish singers
- List of Macedonian singers
- List of Malaysian singers
- List of Mexican singers
- List of Moldovan singers
- List of Nepalese singers
- List of New Zealand singers
- List of Pakistani singers
- List of Polish singers
- List of Portuguese singers
- List of Romanian singers
- List of Russian singers
- List of Serbian singers
- List of Singaporean singers
- List of Slovenian singers
- List of Sudanese singers
- List of Swiss singers
- List of Taiwanese singers
- List of Turkish singers
- List of Ukrainian singers
- List of Venezuelan singers
- List of Yemeni singers

== By genre ==
- Chronological list of operatic sopranos
- List of baritones in non-classical music
- List of Carnatic singers
- List of Christian vocal artists
- List of contraltos in non-classical music
- List of crooners
- List of female heavy metal singers
- List of jazz singers
- List of mezzo-sopranos in non-classical music
- List of operatic contraltos
- List of operatic pop artists
- List of female rock singers
- List of scat singers
- List of sopranos in non-classical music
- List of Sufi singers
- List of tango singers
- List of tenors in non-classical music

== By nationality and genre ==
- List of American female country singers
- List of Azerbaijani opera singers
- List of Brazilian singers and bands of Christian music
- List of Danish operatic sopranos
- List of Finnish operatic sopranos
- List of Norwegian operatic sopranos
- List of Swedish operatic sopranos
- List of traditional Irish singers
- List of Pakistani pop singers
- List of Russian opera singers
- List of Ukrainian opera singers

== By language or region ==
- List of Afrikaans singers
- List of Geordie singers
- List of Pashto-language singers
- List of Punjabi singers
- List of Sindhi singers
- List of Bhojpuri singers

== Other ==
- List of African-American singers
- List of Broadway musicals stars
- List of lead vocalists
- List of singer-songwriters

== See also ==
- Lists of composers
- Lists of musicians
- Lists of women in music
