= Dioguardi =

Dioguardi or DioGuardi is an Italian surname literally translating to 'May God protect'. Notable people with the surname include:

- Giovanni Dioguardi (1914–1979), best known as Johnny Dio, American labor racketeer
- Joe DioGuardi (born 1940), American politician
- Kara DioGuardi (born 1970), American singer-songwriter
- Nick Dioguardi (1932–2015), Italian-born American racing driver
- Pasta Dioguardi (born 1961), Argentine actor
- Patrizia Dioguardi, known as just Patrizia, Italian-Canadian singer
- Philippe DioGuardi (born 1961), Canadian tax lawyer
