= Oksana Petrusenko =

Ukrainian opera singer

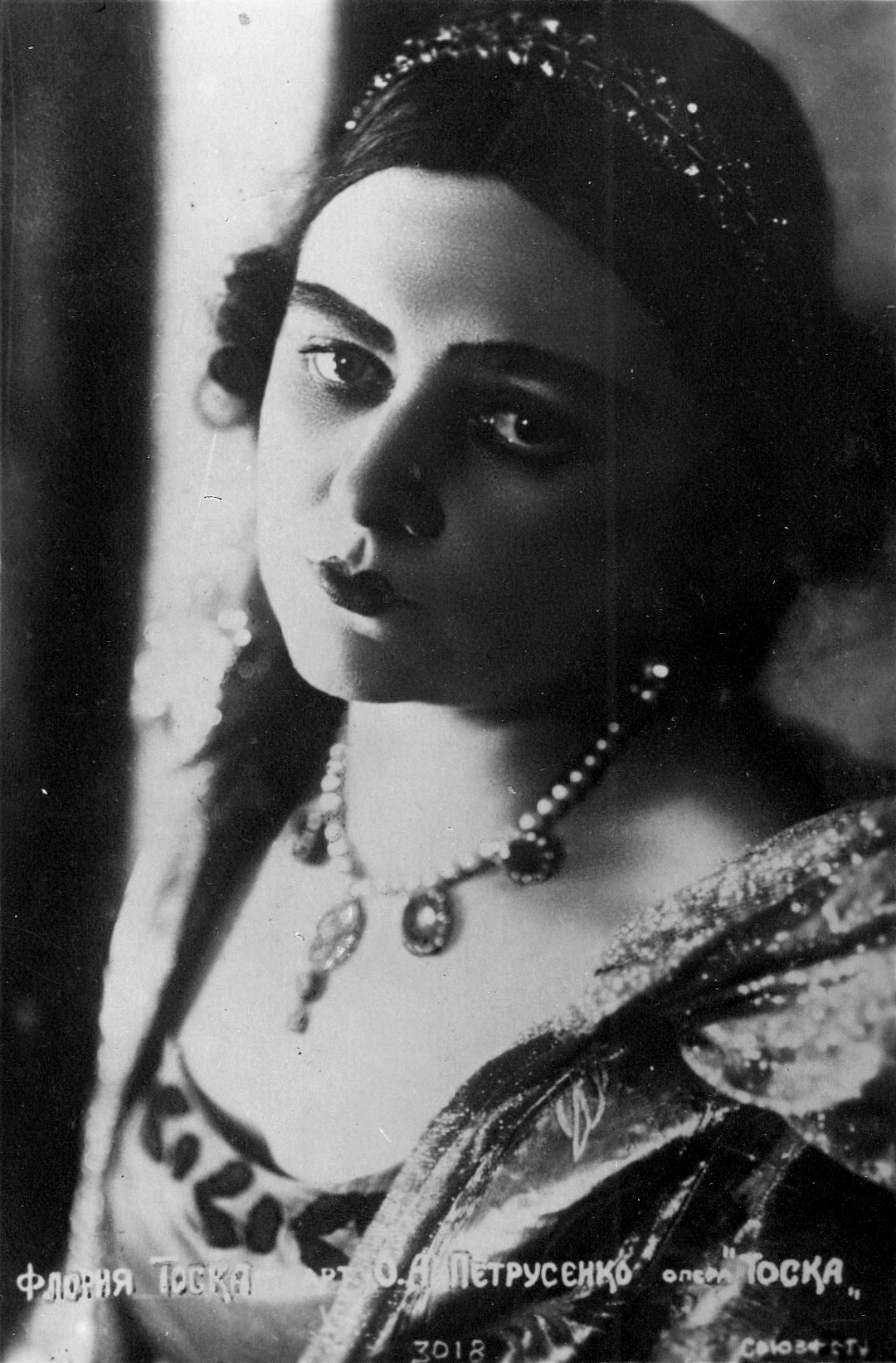
Oksana Petrusenko as Tosca, 1936

Oksana Petrusenko (Ukrainian: Оксана Петрусенко), sometime given as Oxana Andriïvna Petrusenko, born Kseniya Andriivna Borodavkina (Ukrainian: Ксенія Андріївна Бородавкіна; 18 (O.S. 5) February 1900–15 July 1940) was a Ukrainian singer and actress. A lyrical-dramatic soprano, she was known for drama and opera roles, as well as performances of Ukrainian folk songs. In 1939 Petrusenko received the title of People's Artist of Ukrainian SSR.

== Biography ==
Kseniya Borodavkina was born on 5 (18) February 1900 in Sevastopol, Crimea. Her father, a Black Sea Fleet serviceman, was a native of Balakliia near Kharkiv, had a good voice and was known as an amateur performer of Ukrainian folk songs. After his death of tuberculosis in 1901, Oksana lived with her mother, a native of Orel Governorate, and at the age of 14 started to work part-time at the local port. Her vocal abilities were observed from a young age, and thanks to the support of the local chapelmaster, she was accepted to the Sevastopol gymnasium. The girl sang in a number of choirs and performed in an opera duo together with the future Bolshoy Theatre soloist Dmitry Golovin. In 1918 she ran away from home and joined the wandering troupe of Stepan Hlazunenko, which travelled around Crimea. During that time Oksana debuted performing solo in a production of Petro Nishchynsky's Vechornytsi. Between 1918 and 1921 Petrusenko performed at the Kherson Musical Drama Theatre, where she met her first husband and adopted her pseudonym. In February 1919 she debuted on stage in the role of Odarka in Semen Hulak-Artemovsky's opera Zaporozhets za Dunayem. In Kherson she met Panas Saksahansky, who nicknamed the singer "Ukrainian nightingale".

In 1921 Petrusenko moved to Uman, where she performed in several local troupes. During that time, she took acting lessons from Maria Zankovetska. In 1923 she performed at a theatre in Zaporizhzhia. Between 1923 and 1924 she studied at the Mykola Lysenko Musical Drama Institute in Kyiv, where one of her teachers was Olena Muravyova. In 1927 Petrusenko made her opera debut playing Oksana in a performance of Tchaikovsky's Cherevichki in Kazan. In 1929 she moved to Sverdlovsk, and a few months became the main soloist of the local opera. In 1931-1934 Petrusenko performed at the Middle Volga State Opera in Samara, debuting as Aida in the eponymous opera by Giuseppe Verdi. There she became acquainted with fellow opera singer Antonina Nezhdanova.

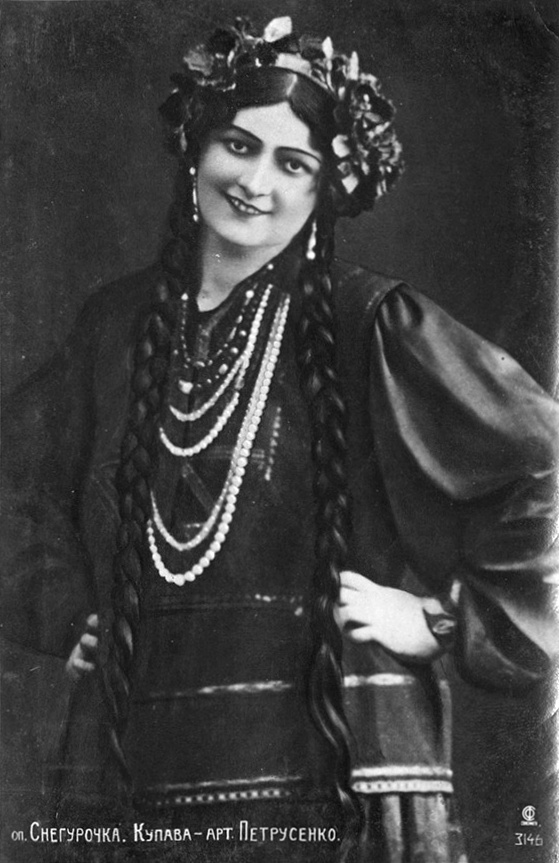
Petrusenko as Kupava, 1931

In 1934 Petrusenko moved to Kyiv Opera. Despite receiving proposals from Bolshoy and Mariinsky Theatre, she would stay employed in the Ukrainian capital for the rest of her life. In March 1936 she performed in Moscow's Bolshoy Theatre, singing the part of Kupava in Rimsky-Korsakov's The Snow Maiden. Soviet dictator Joseph Stalin was claimed to have attended all of Petrusenko's performances in Moscow, and even allegedly invited her to visit him at his dacha. During the Great Purge of the late 1930s, Petrusenko was expelled from her position at the Kyiv Opera, possibly due to her personal connections to Panas Liubchenko; it was said that she was planning suicide in the belief that her career was over. However, after an intervention of her Moscow colleagues, who personally presented her appeal to Kliment Voroshilov, Petrusenko was soon restored on her job. Following the Soviet annexation of Eastern Galicia and Volhynia, Petrusenko made a tour visit to Lviv along with her theatre. There she met fellow Ukrainian opera singer Solomiya Krushelnytska, who expressed interest for her work.

In early 1940 Ukrainian folk painter Kateryna Bilokur, who had been greatly impressed by Petrusenko's singing after hearing it on the radio, sent the singer a letter containing one of her drawings. Petrusenko was also impressed by Bilokur's talent, and promoted her creativity in artistic circles, as a result of which the painter could organize her first personal exhibition.

Oksana Petrusenko died in Kyiv on 15 July 1940, one week after giving birth to her second son. According to the official version, her death was caused by a blood clot, which resulted from overexertion: on the previous day she had performed an improvised concert in the maternity ward. However, some claim that the singer was poisoned. Petrusenko was buried on 17 July in Kyiv's Baikove Cemetery; her funeral procession was said to have been several kilometers long and reportedly numbered 100,000 people. An epitaph to the singer was composed by Ukrainian poet Pavlo Tychyna. A salute was given during Petrusenko's funeral, an honour usually reserved to highest state officials.

== Scenical image and repertoire ==
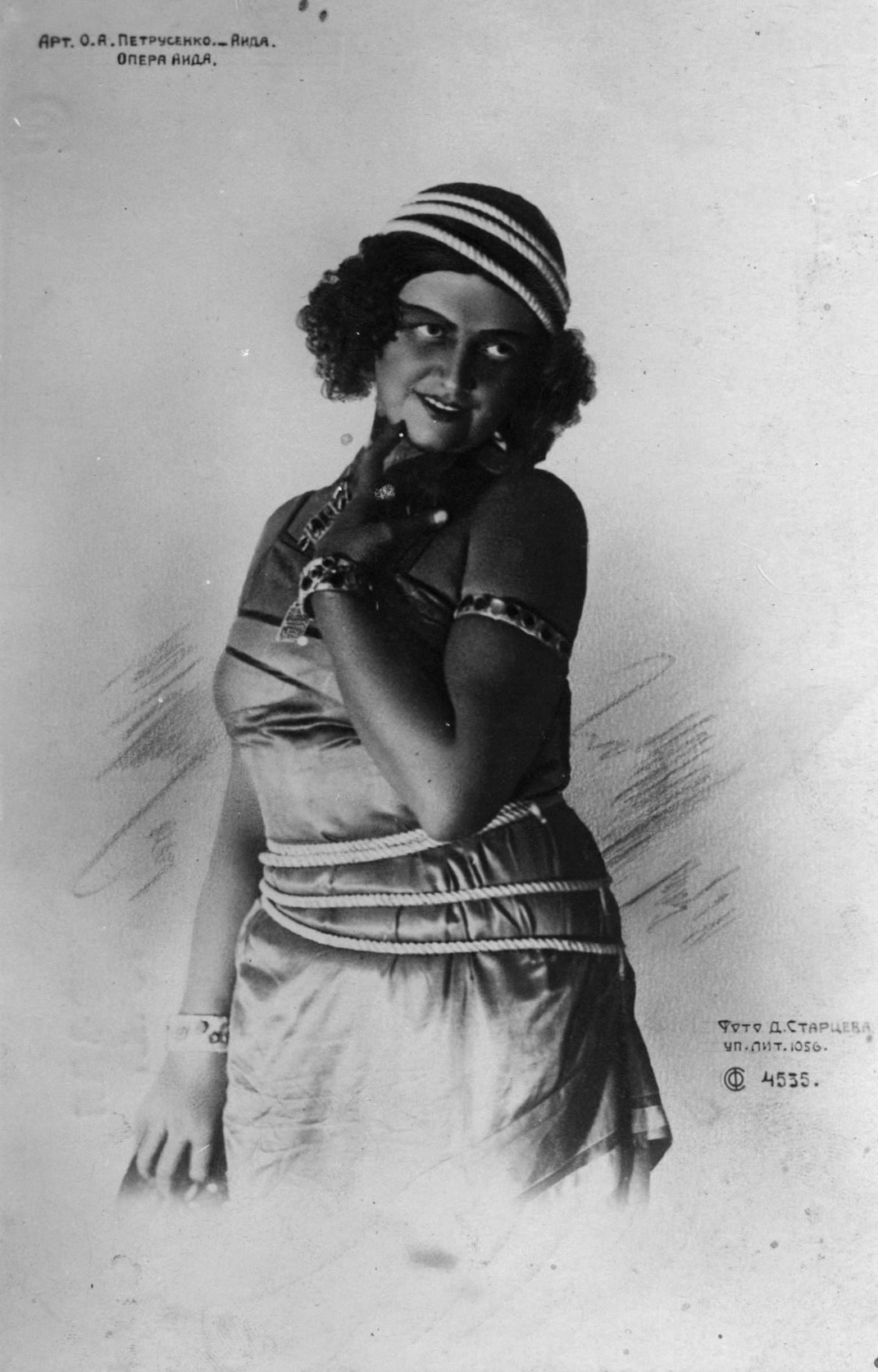
Petrusenko playing Aida, 1936

Known for her powerful voice and great acting talent, Petrusenko achieved great popularity among the general population. Along with her theatrical appearances, she organized numerous concerts, performing in cinemas, factories and workers' clubs. Among her partners on the stage were Zoya Hayday, Mykola Donets and other notable artists. She engaged in harsh competition with Maria Lytvynenko-Volhemut, and was reputed to be the most popular Ukrainian singer of the pre-war period.

Petrusenko performed songs and romances to the words of Taras Shevchenko, as well as works by Mykola Lysenko, Kyrylo Stetsenko, Yakiv Stepovy, Pyotr Tchaikovsky, Richard Wagner, Gioachino Rossini, Miguel Delibes, Giuseppe Verdi and other composers. She also sang under direction of Lev Steinberg. In order to refine her Ukrainian pronunciation, Petrusenko took lessons from Ukrainian poet Maksym Rylsky.

=== Notable roles ===
- Natalka (Natalka Poltavka by Mykola Lysenko);
- Odarka (Zaporozhets za Dunayem by Semen Hulak-Artemovsky);
- Kupava (The Snow Maiden by Nikolai Rimsky-Korsakov);
- Yaroslavna (Prince Igor by Alexander Borodin);
- Natasha (Rusalka by Alexander Dargomyzhsky).

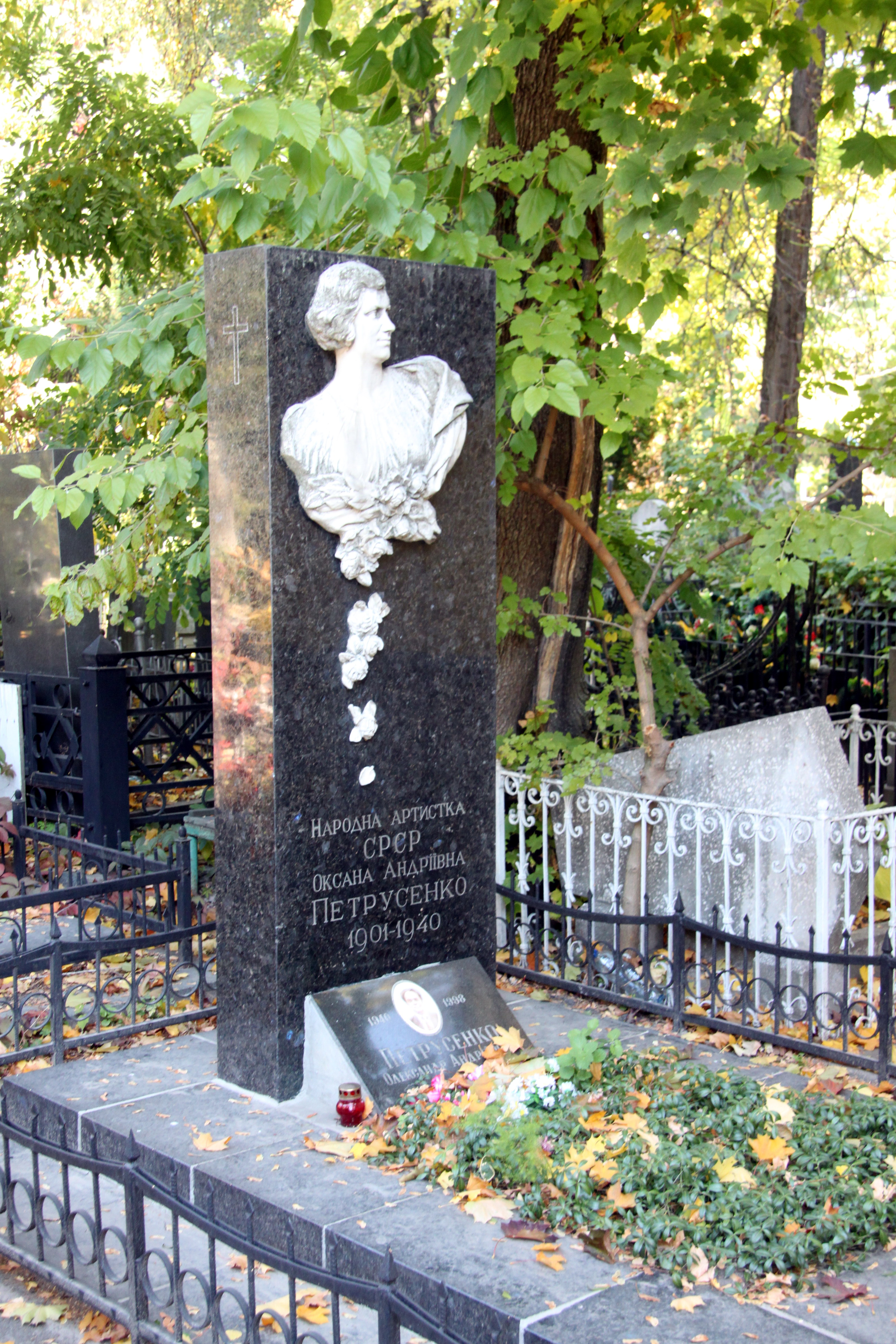
Grave of Oksana Petrusenko on Baikove Cemetery in Kyiv

== Personal life ==
Petrusenko met her first romantic partner, Petro Boychenko, who was twice older than her, in Kherson. Her pseudonym stemmed from Boyhchenko's first name in a diminutive form. The couple had no children and separated after Oksana enrolled to study in Kyiv, contrary to Petro's wishes.

In Kyiv, Petrusenko had an affair with Mefodiy Semeniuta, an actor of the local opera. They never married, and after Oksana became pregnant, Mefodiy insisted on an abortion. Soon after their separation, on 15 January 1925 Petrusenko gave birth to her first son Volodymyr.

While performing in Kazan, Petrusenko met the singer Vasyl Moskalenko, who was a fellow actor in an opera. The couple married, and Moskalenko even adopted her son, but soon thereafter the couple divorced due to Vasyl being envious of Oksana's fame. Petrusenko also had an affair with Ukrainian poet Pavlo Tychyna, who later wrote her epitaph and financed the installation of a monument over her grave.

Petrusenko's last romantic partner was Andriy Chekaniuk, a journalist of the Komunist newspaper, whom she met during her visit to Lviv. After Oksana became pregnant for the second time, Chekaniuk, who was six years younger, married and had two children, abandoned her with the son, who would receive the name Oleksandr.

== Legacy ==
In 1966 a memorial plaque to Petrusenko was installed on the wall of her last residence in Kyiv. In 2010 another memorial plaque was unveiled on the facade of Sevastopol Drama Theatre. Streets in several Ukrainian cities have been named after the singer, and starting from 1962 several exhibitions dedicated to her memory have been organized. In 2000 Petrusenko was commemorated on a Ukrainian post stamp, and in 2010 a memorial 5 hryvnia coin dedicated to her was issued. Singing contests in her honour have been organized in Ukraine and the diaspora. Petrusenko also became a subject of several films.
