= List of Ukrainian singers =

This is a list of Ukrainian singers who were either born on the territory of modern-day Ukraine or are considered to be ethnically Ukrainian.

== List by century of birth ==
=== 18th century ===
Singer	Portrait	Date	Birthplace	Notes
Marko Poltoratsky		1729-1795	Sosnitsa, Kiev Governorate, Russian Empire	baritone
Maksym Berezovsky		c. 1745-1777	Hlukhiv, Cossack Hetmanate, Russian Empire	soprano or tenor
Dmytro Bortniansky		1751-1825	Hlukhiv, Cossack Hetmanate, Russian Empire	

=== 19th century ===
Singer	Portrait	Date	Birthplace	Notes
Semen Hulak-Artemovsky		1813-1873	Horodyshche, Kiev Governorate, Russian Empire	
Natalia Mykhailovska		c. 1843 - ?	Kyiv, Kiev Governorate, Russian Empire	
Solomia Krushelnytska		1872-1952	Biliavyntsi, Kingdom of Galicia and Lodomeria, Austria-Hungary	soprano
Mykhailo Romensky		1887-1971	Kursk, Kursk Governorate, Russian Empire	bass
Yurii Kyporenko-Domansky		1888-1955	Kharkiv, Kharkov Governorate, Russian Empire	tenor
Maria Lytvynenko-Volgemut		1892-1966	Kyiv, Kiev Governorate, Russian Empire	soprano
Mark Reizen		1895-1992	Zaitsevo, Yekaterinoslav Governorate, Russian Empire	bass
Irena Turkevycz		1899-1983	Brody, Kingdom of Galicia and Lodomeria, Austria-Hungary	
Ivan Kozlovsky		1900-1993	Marianivka, Kiev Governorate, Russian Empire	tenor
Andrii Ivanov		1900-1970	Zamość, Lublin Governorate, Russian Empire	baritone

=== 20th century ===
Singer	Portrait	Date	Birthplace	Notes
Mykhailo Hryshko		1901-1973	Mariupol, Ekaterinoslav Governorate, Russian Empire	baritone
Zoia Haidai		1902-1965	Tambov, Tambov Governorate, Russian Empire	soprano
Borys Hmyria		1903-1969	Lebedyn, Kharkov Governorate, Russian Empire	bass
Mykhailo Minsky		1918-1988	Bagaevo, Kazan Governorate, Russian SFSR	baritone
Veronika Borysenko		1918-1995	Bolshyie Niemky, Russian Empire	mezzo-soprano
Mykola Fokin		1912-1990	Kyiv, Kiev Governorate, Russian Empire	tenor
Bela Rudenko		1922-2021	Antratsyt, Luhansk Oblast, Ukrainian SSR	soprano
Oleksandr Taranets		1924-1998	Zelene, Katerynoslav Governorate, Ukrainian SSR	baritone
Yelizaveta Chavdar		1925-1989	Odesa, Odessa Oblast, Ukrainian SSR	soprano
Dmytro Hnatiuk		1925-2016	Mămăești, Romania	baritone
Halyna Oliinychenko		1928-2013	Budionivka, Odessa Oblast, Ukrainian SSR	soprano
Anatolii Solovianenko		1932-1999	Donetsk, Donetsk Oblast, Ukrainian SSR	tenor
Renata Babak		1934-2003	Kharkiv, Kharkiv Oblast, Ukrainian SSR	mezzo-soprano
Vladyslav Horai		1965-2025	Malyn, Zhytomyr Oblast, Ukrainian SSR	tenor
Olha Kulchynska		1990-	Rivne, Rivne Oblast, Ukrainian SSR	soprano
Maruv
