= List of operatic pop artists =

This is a list of vocalists whose music combines elements of classical and pop.

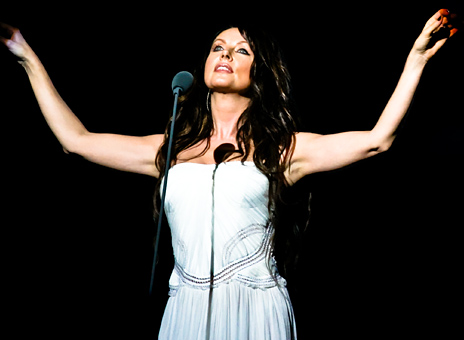
Sarah Brightman in concert (2007).

Operatic pop or popera is a subgenre of pop music that is performed in an operatic singing style or a song, theme or motif from classical music stylized as pop.

== Operatic pop solo singers ==
Notable operatic pop solo singers include:

- Aled Jones
- Alessandro Safina
- Alfie Boe
- Amaury Vassili
- Amira Willighagen
- Amy Nuttall
- Andrea Bocelli
- Bárbara Padilla
- Camilla Kerslake
- Carly Paoli
- Charlotte Church
- Chris Mann
- Christina Johnston
- Emma Shapplin
- Faryl Smith
- Fernando Lima
- Fernando Varela
- Filippa Giordano
- Garðar Thór Cortes
- Giorgia Fumanti
- Grace Bawden
- Hayley Westenra
- Hollie Steel
- Holly Holyoake
- Isabel Suckling
- Izzy
- Jackie Evancho
- Jai McDowall
- Joanna Forest
- Joe McElderry
- John Riesen
- Jon Christos
- Jonathan Ansell
- Jonathan Antoine
- Josh Groban
- Kanon
- Katherine Jenkins
- Keedie
- Laura Bretan
- Laura Wright
- Lauren Jelencovich
- Lim Hyung-joo
- Lizzie Marvelly
- Margaret Keys
- Mario Frangoulis
- Mark Masri
- Mark Vincent
- Mary-Jess Leaverland
- Mirusia Louwerse
- Natalie Di Luccio
- Natalie Rushdie
- Natasha Marsh
- Nathan Pacheco
- Neal E. Boyd
- Noah Stewart
- Patrizia
- Paul Potts
- Paul Ettore Tabone
- Rebecca Newman
- Rhydian Roberts
- Russell Watson
- Sarah Brightman
- Sasha Lazard
- Siobhan Owen
- Sissel
- Tayla Alexander
- Vittorio Grigolo
- Will Martin
- Wynne Evans
- Yulia
- Zoe Mace

== Operatic pop groups ==
Notable operatic pop groups include:

- All Angels
- Amici Forever
- Angelis
- Blake
- Branden & James
- Cantamus Girls Choir
- Celtic Woman
- Forte Tenors
- G4
- Gregorian (band)
- Il Divo
- Il Volo
- Jonathan and Charlotte
- Libera (choir)
- Only Men Aloud!
- Opera Babes
- Richard & Adam
- RyanDan
- Scala & Kolacny Brothers
- Sephira
- Sol3 Mio
- The Tenors
- The Texas Tenors

== See also ==
- Rock opera (and Category)
- Crossover music
- List of classical and art music traditions
- Lists of singers
- Lists of musicians
