= Ivan Kozlovsky =

Soviet lyric tenor (1900–1993)

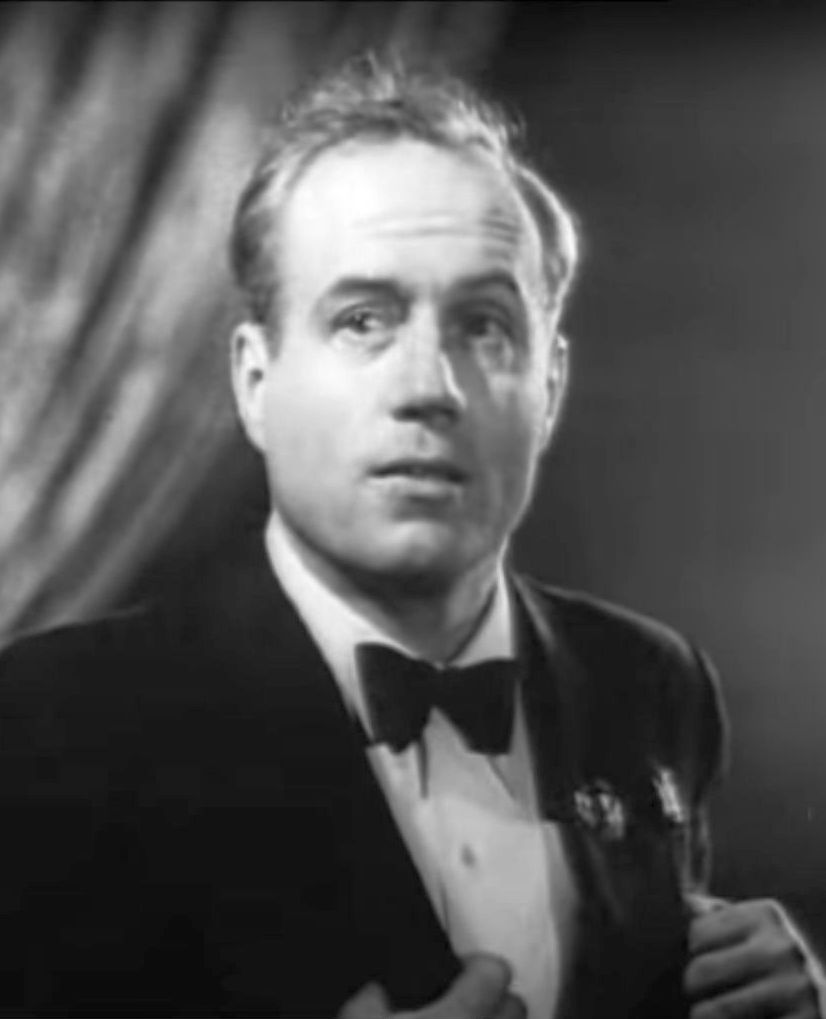
Ivan Semyonovich Kozlovsky in 1942

Ivan Semyonovich Kozlovsky (Note: Russian: Иван Семёнович Козловский; Ukrainian: Іван Семенович Козловський, romanized: Ivan Semenovych Kozlovskyi; Sometimes given as Kozlovskiy or Kozlovskij) (24 March [O.S. 11 March] 1900 – 21 December 1993) was a Soviet lyric tenor and one of the most well known stars of Russian opera, as well a producer and director of his own opera company, and longtime teacher at the Moscow Conservatory. He received the titles of People's Artist of the USSR (1940), Hero of Socialist Labour (1980), People's Artist of Ukraine (1993), and was a laureate of Shevchenko State Prize (1990). According to Stephen Kotkin, he was Joseph Stalin's favorite singer.

== Biography ==
Ivan Kozlovsky was born into a peasant family in the village of Marianivka near Bila Tserkva, the Kyiv Governorate (now Vasylkiv Raion, Kyiv Oblast, Ukraine). He began to sing at the age of seven in the choir of the St. Michael's Golden-Domed Monastery. He went on to study drama, piano and singing (with the famous soprano Olena Muravyova) at the Kyiv National I. K. Karpenko-Kary Theatre, Cinema and Television University. He also sang with his brother in Alexander Koshetz's choir in Kyiv and played on the stage of Mykola Sadovskyi's theatre (now Kyiv National Academic Theatre of Operetta), where his partner was Maria Zankovetska. His instruction was cut short after two years, due to the outbreak of the civil war in the aftermath of the Russian Revolution. Kozlovsky sang in a vocal quartet under the direction of O. Sveshnikov. His voice enabled him to join the army engineers, as a lead singer in a military band.

He made his operatic début in 1922 as Faust at the Poltava theatre, where he sang until 1923, organizing a choir of Red Army soldiers. All of Kozlovsky's performances during that period were in the Ukrainian language. He continued his career with engagements at the Kharkiv opera in 1923-1925, where he partnered with Maria Lytvynenko-Volgemut and Panas Saksahansky, and the Sverdlovsk (now Yekaterinburg) opera theatre in 1925-1926, before becoming one of the leading tenors at the Bolshoi Theatre in Moscow from 1926 to 1954. Kozlovsky had a memorable audition at the Bolshoi in 1924, reportedly reaching the highest notes of the register with ease (throughout his career, he developed a reputation for singing the highest note possible and hanging onto it for the added adulation). At the Bolshoi, he came under the mentorship of Leonid Sobinov, the leading Russian tenor at the time. Kozlovsky debuted with a part in Giuseppe Verdi's La Traviata, and went on to sing in over 50 operas as the leading tenor of the Bolshoi.

In 1938, Kozlovsky organized and directed a concert ensemble of opera singers, VTO Soviet Opera Ensemble, directing himself in Werther by Massenet and Orfeo ed Euridice by Gluck, among other productions. He was awarded the prestigious designation of People's Artist of the USSR in 1940. Kozlovsky was well known to be a favorite singer of Joseph Stalin. (Note: These facts were recorded from Kozlovsky's own words on March 21, 1981; see the link (in Russian).) Kozlovsky gained great renown throughout the Soviet Union, and in 1945 also toured Romania and Czechoslovakia. During his career, Kozlovsky visited his native Ukraine almost every year, meeting numerous Ukrainian cultural figures, among them poet Andriy Malyshko and writer Oles Honchar. Among his close friends was Ukrainian author Maksym Rylsky, who dedicated one of his verses to the singer.

Kozlovsky gave many concerts throughout the Soviet Union, singing Russian and Ukrainian songs and romances, as well as German lieder by Schubert, Schumann, and Liszt. He taught singing at the Moscow Conservatory from 1956 to 1980. After 1954, Kozlovsky continued to appear occasionally at the Bolshoi, giving his final appearance in 1970 in the role of Yurodivy (the Simpleton) in Boris Godunov. He continued to appear frequently in public and even sang on 4 July 1985 at Mark Reizen's 90th birthday at the Bolshoi. The last concert given by Kozlovsky took place in 1990 at the Bolshoi Theatre in Moscow. He even had an interview after his final performance. Three years later, he died in Moscow at the age of 93.

== Singing career ==
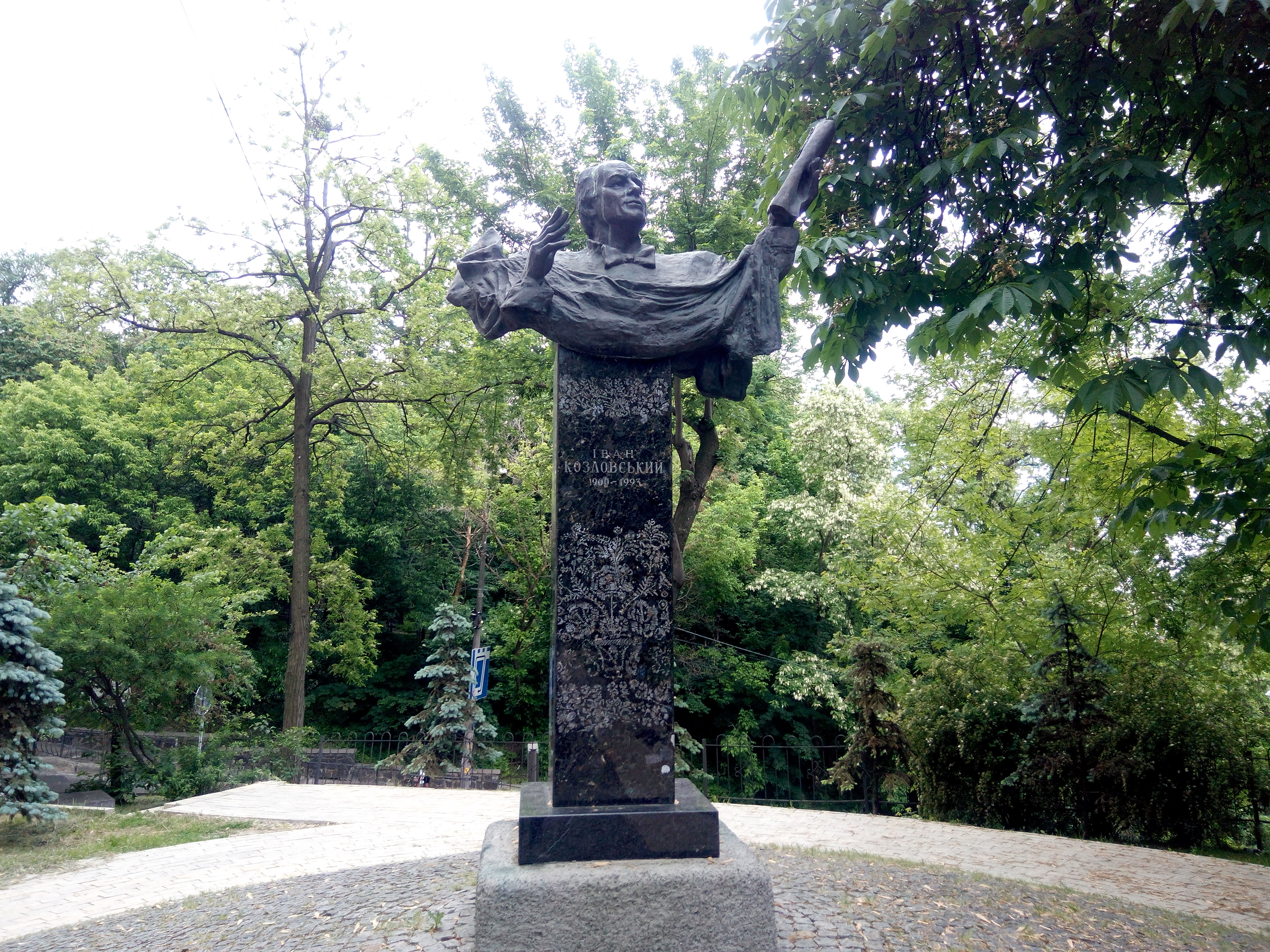
A bust of Kozlovskyi in Kyiv

A lyrical tenor, Kozlovsky was a masterful performer of romances. His repertoire included works by renowned composers, both Ukrainian (Semen Hulak-Artemovsky, Mykola Lysenko, Petro Sokalsky, Yakiv Stepovy, Kyrylo Stetsenko, Levko Revutsky, Borys Lyatoshynsky, Stanislav Lyudkevych, Valeri Kikta), Russian (Mikhail Glinka, Alexander Dargomyzhsky, Pyotr Tchaikovsky, Sergei Rachmaninoff) and others (Ludwig van Beethoven, Robert Schumann, Franz Schubert, Ferenc Liszt).

- Lensky's air from Tchaikovsky's opera Eugene Onegin (1940) on YouTube

Kozlovsky sang more than 50 operatic roles, and was especially famous as Lensky in Eugene Onegin, Berendey in The Snow Maiden, Levko in May Night, the Indian Guest in Sadko, Vladimir in Prince Igor, Nero in the opera by Anton Rubinstein, Dubrovsky in the opera by Eduard Nápravník, and so on. He also was outstanding in the western repertoire: Faust (Gounod), Werther, Rigoletto, The Barber of Seville, Lohengrin, Orfeo ed Euridice, La traviata, La bohème, and so on.

Kozlovsky throughout his life was an active proponent of Ukrainian music, and performed works by Ukrainian composers. In 1924, he sang the role of Yontek in Moniuszko's Halka in Ukrainian. In 1970, he funded the construction of a music school in his home village of Marianivka. He produced 22 records of Ukrainian folk songs, romances and arias in Ukrainian. Kozlovsky was also the author of numerous memoirs about Ukrainian singers Oksana Petrusenko, Mykhailo Donets, M. Mykysh, Borys Hmyria and others. (Note: The webpage Ukrainian arias performed by Ukrainian tenor Ivan Kozlovsky includes several recordings.)

Kozlovsky had a friendly rivalry with Sergei Lemeshev, another opera singer immensely popular in Soviet Union. They often sang the same roles, and Soviet opera lovers were divided into supporters of one or the other. The theatre lobby was a venue for scuffles between fans jokingly called the "lemeshistki" and the "kozlovityanki".

== Acting career ==
In 1939 Kozlovsky established his own opera ensemble, working as its artistic manager and producing several operas. In 1940 he performed one of the parts in the opera Kateryna by Mykola Arkas, and in 1954 played the role of Petro in Lysenko's adaptation of Natalka Poltavka.

Kozlovsky was also a film actor, appearing in Boris Godunov (1954), Poem of the Sea (1958) and Zaporozhets za Dunayem (1937).

== Personal life ==
Kozlovsky married the popular actress Alexandra Herzig (1886–1964), who was 14 years older and much better known, causing the public to refer to him as "Herzig's husband". Later, when he attained greater fame, Herzig became known as "Kozlovsky's wife". After his first marriage ended in divorce, Kozlovsky remarried, this time to an actress 14 years younger, Galina Sergeyeva. Sergeyeva played the female lead in the films Pyshka (Пышкa) ("Boule de Suif," 1934), Lyubov Alyony (Любoвь Aлёны) ("Alyona's Love", 1934), and Vesennie dni (Весенние дни) ("Spring Days", 1934). They had two daughters; their marriage did not last long.

== Legacy ==
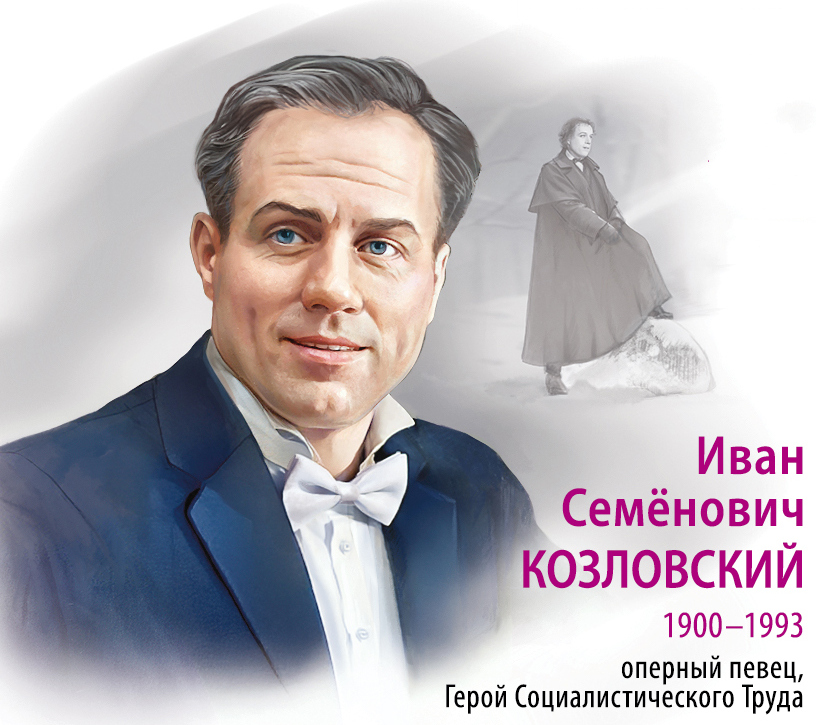
Kozlovskyi on a 2025 postcard of Russia

In September 1993, the belt asteroid 4944 Kozlovskij was named in honor of Ivan Kozlovsky's career (M.P.C. 22504); his famous rival Sergey Lemeshev received the same honor with asteroid 4561 Lemeshev upon his death in 1978.

A charitable foundation with the aim of supporting Ukrainian opera, which was established in 1995 in Kyiv, bears the name of Ivan Kozlovsky.

== Quotations ==
"They say that Ivan Kozlovsky considered his voice as his one and only possession and prayed every morning thanking the Lord for the priceless gift He gave him..." (Olga Fyodorova, Music portraits, see the link below)

"Lemeshev is a far more lyric and tender Gherman than those to whom we’ve become accustomed. He and Kozlovsky were long-time rivals; each sings Lensky’s aria, with quite different emphases." (Stefan Zucker)

"31 October 2005, 17:31. Monument to known Ukrainian singer Ivan Kozlovsky to be erected in Kyiv. This decision was made by Kyiv City Hall. It was decided that Pechersk district state administration is to erect the monument at its expense." (From the official news)

== Discography ==
- The Great Russian Tenor - Ivan Kozlovsky: Pearl GEM0221, Released 7 February 2005 ADD
- Russian Opera at the Bolshoi: The Vintage Years: DVD Region 1 (playable worldwide) #FD2019, Russian, English subtitles. 112m. B& W/Color, Dolby Digital audio.
- Tchaikovsky, Eugene Onegin Aleksandr Ivanovich Orlov: Melodiya D 0253/60 (1952), D 09377/82(1962), Chant du Monde LDX 8088/90, Bruno 23001/3, Colosseum CRLP 10270, 80 and 90
- Mussorgsky, Boris Godunov, Melodiya D 0305/12 (1952), D 05836/43 (1959); Ultraphone 159/62; Bruno 23025/7; Colosseum 124/6; Period SPLP 554 (1952), 1033

Also this link

== See also ==
- Russian opera
