= Lanigiros =

Swiss band

Lanigiros, also Lanigiro Syncopating Melody Kings and Lanigiro Hot Players, was a Swiss jazz band. The name "Lanigiro" is "original" spelled in reverse. According to The New Grove, the group was "the first band entirely made up of Swiss musicians to record jazz".

Hans Philippi, a tubaist, founded the group in 1924 at his high school under the name Lanigiro Syncopating Melody Kings. Initially, it was a dance band playing light music, and soon began performing beyond the school at local venues and on radio. In 1929, it began recording in styles recognizably influenced by American jazz. René Schmassmann took control of the group in 1932 and renamed it the Lanigiro Hot Players; the group toured widely throughout western Europe in the 1930s and recorded in Berlin. Leadership passed to Bruno Bandini in 1939, and under Badini the group recorded several times, with performers on these recordings including René Bertschy, Fernand Clare, Rio De Gregori, and Eric Landsrath. While the membership of the group changed over time, the group remained active until 1961.
