= 4944 Kozlovskij =

Asteroid

Discovery
- Discovered by: L. Chernykh
- Discovery site: Crimean Astrophysical Obs.
- Discovery date: 2 September 1987

Designations
- Named after: Ivan Kozlovsky (Ukrainian opera singer)
- Alternative designations: 1987 RP_{3} · 1978 VK_{13} 1985 DP_{2} · 1991 NX_{7}
- Minor planet category: main-belt · (middle); Witt

Orbital characteristics
- Epoch 23 March 2018 (JD 2458200.5)
- Uncertainty parameter 0
- Observation arc: 65.41 yr (23,890 d)
- Aphelion: 2.9170 AU
- Perihelion: 2.5733 AU
- Semi-major axis: 2.7451 AU
- Eccentricity: 0.0626
- Orbital period (sidereal): 4.55 yr (1,661 d)
- Mean anomaly: 252.23°
- Mean motion: 0° 13^{m} 0.12^{s} / day
- Inclination: 4.4903°
- Longitude of ascending node: 279.41°
- Argument of perihelion: 84.781°

Physical characteristics
- Dimensions: 9.25±1.11 km 9.89±2.71 km 9.91 km (calculated); 10.85±2.35 km 11.125±0.083 km
- Synodic rotation period: 3.573±0.0006 h
- Geometric albedo: 0.057 (assumed); 0.061±0.006; 0.086±0.032; 0.09±0.09; 0.157±0.038
- Spectral type: SMASS = Cb · C
- Absolute magnitude (H): 12.80 · 13.1 · 13.20 · 13.297±0.003 (R) · 13.3 · 13.42±0.25 · 13.75

4944 Kozlovskij, provisional designation 1987 RP_{3}, is a carbonaceous Witt asteroid from the central regions of the asteroid belt, approximately 10 kilometers (6 miles) in diameter. It was discovered on 2 September 1987, by Soviet astronomer Lyudmila Chernykh at the Crimean Astrophysical Observatory in Nauchnij, on the Crimean Peninsula. The asteroid was named for Ukrainian opera singer Ivan Kozlovsky.

== Classification ==
Kozlovskij is a member of the Witt family (535), a large family of (predominantly) stony asteroids with more than 1,600 known members. It orbits the Sun in the central main-belt at a distance of 2.6–2.9 AU once every 4 years and 7 months (1,661 days; semi-major axis of 2.75 AU). Its orbit has an eccentricity of 0.06 and an inclination of 4° with respect to the ecliptic. The asteroid's observation arc begins 36 years prior to its official discovery observation, with a precovery taken at Palomar Observatory in December 1951.

== Physical characteristics ==
In the SMASS classification, Kozlovskij is a Cb-type asteroid, an intermediary between the carbonaceous C-type and the somewhat brighter B-type asteroids.

=== Lightcurves ===
In October 2010, a rotational lightcurve of Kozlovskij was obtained from photometric observations in the R-band by astronomers at the Palomar Transient Factory in California. Lightcurve analysis gave a rotation period of 3.573 hours with a brightness amplitude of 0.46 magnitude (U=2).

=== Diameter and albedo ===
According to the surveys carried out by the Japanese Akari satellite and the NEOWISE mission of NASA's Wide-field Infrared Survey Explorer (WISE), Kozlovskij measures 9.25 and 9.89 kilometers in diameter and its surface has an albedo of 0.157 and 0.09, respectively. Preliminary WISE results gave a larger diameter of 10.85 and 11.125 kilometers with lower albedo of 0.086 and 0.061, respectively.

The Collaborative Asteroid Lightcurve Link assumes a standard albedo for carbonaceous asteroids of 0.057 and calculates a diameter of 9.91 kilometers based on an absolute magnitude of 13.75.

== Naming ==
This minor planet was named after Russian opera singer Ivan Kozlovsky (1900–1993), who was a rare lyric tenor and a popular singer in the former Soviet Union. The approved naming citation was published by the Minor Planet Center on 1 September 1993 (M.P.C. 22504).
