= List of Swiss singers =

This is a list of notable Swiss singers that have entered the industry, currently working or have left the industry.

== A ==
- Susanne Abbuehl
- Irene Aebi
- Bruno Amstad

== B ==
- Black Tiger
- René Bertschy
- Bligg
- DJ BoBo
- Sarah Buechi

== C ==
- Lucia Cadotsch
- Hugues Cuénod
- Corin Curschellas

== D ==
- Ruben Drole

== E ==
- Kings Elliot

== F ==
- Florat

== G ==
- Griot

== H ==
- Michael von der Heide
- Daniel Hellmann
- Sophie Hunger

== J ==
- Patrick Juvet

== K ==
- Beat Kaestli
- Miriam Klein

== L ==
- Ladyva
- Naomi Lareine
- Carlos Leal

== M ==
- Nella Martinetti
- Mimiks

== N ==
- Nemo (singer)

== O ==
- Osez

== P ==
- Mauro Peter

== R ==
- Rykka

== S ==
- Andreas Schaerer
- Nadja Sieger

== T ==
- Tatiana Eva-Marie

== W ==
- Oliver Widmer
