= List of Luxembourgish singers =

This is a list of notable Luxembourgish singers that have entered the industry, currently working or have left the industry.

== C ==
- Sophie Carle
- Mary Christy

== D ==
- Francis of Delirium

== F ==
- Camillo Felgen

== G ==
- Tali Golergant
- Maria Guleghina

== H ==
- Olivier Heim
- Yannchen Hoffmann

== K ==
- Mariette Kemmer
- Camille Kerger

== M ==
- Eva Marija
- Monique Melsen
- Claudine Muno

== T ==
- Laura Thorn

== U ==
- Alex Uhlmann
