= Julien Hoffmann =

Luxembourgish composer (1924–2007)

Julien Hoffmann (31 May 1924 – 2007) was a Luxembourgish composer and Professor of Music. Notable arrangements by Hoffman include "Arrangement fir 3 gleich Stömmen" "Arrangement fir Gemöschte Cho'er" and "La Provence", the last composed with Ralph Siegel. Other compositions include "Léif Consolatrix", arranged by Patrick Colombo and published by the Musica International Musica Sacra Luxembourg and " Halleluja " with Kobi Oshrat, which like "La Provence" was published by Bosworth Musikverlag.

Hoffmann composed the march "La marche du Grand-Duc Henri", first performed at a special concert before the Grand Ducal family at the Grand Ducal Palace at 8 p.m. on October 7, 2000. In the darkness, the musicians of la musique militaire were surrounded by reserve soldiers bearing torches. Hoffmann was commissioned to compose the piece as part of the ceremonies for Grand Duke Jean's abdication and Grand Duke Henry's accession to the throne of Luxembourg.

A professor of music, Hoffman was influential in Luxembourg by founding the "Chorale Jong Lëtzebuerg", based on the model of Young Vienna and established in 1966. The choir has performed in front of royalty and on a visit to Vaduz was welcomed by the Prince of Liechtenstein. Hoffmann also served as honorary director of the St Cecilia Choir of Walferdange.

His daughter is mezzo-soprano Yannchen Hoffmann.

Hoffman died in 2007.
