= Hull, Quebec =

Sector in Gatineau, Quebec, Canada

Hull
- Sector within City of Gatineau
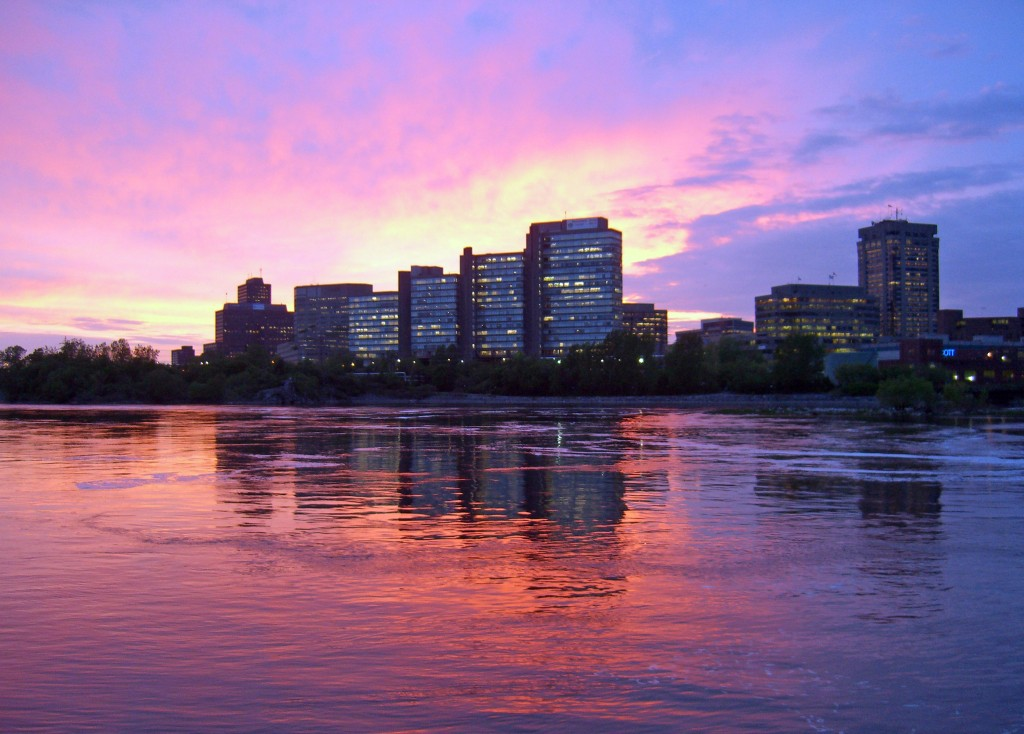
- Sunset on the Hull District
- Interactive map of Hull
- Coordinates: 45°25′43″N 75°42′48″W
- Country: Canada
- Province: Quebec
- Region: Outaouais
- RCM: Gatineau
- Founded: 1800
- Merged: January 1, 2002 with Gatineau

Population (2011)
  - Total: 69,004
  - Change ~2001: +4.2%
- Time zone: UTC-5 (EST)
  - Summer (DST): UTC-4 (EST)
- Area codes: 819, 873
- Access Routes: A-5 A-50

Hull is the central business district and oldest neighbourhood of the city of Gatineau, Quebec, Canada. It is located on the west bank of the Gatineau River and the north shore of the Ottawa River, directly opposite Ottawa. As part of Canada's National Capital Region, it contains offices for more than 20,000 civil servants. It was named after Kingston upon Hull in England.

== History ==
=== Early history ===
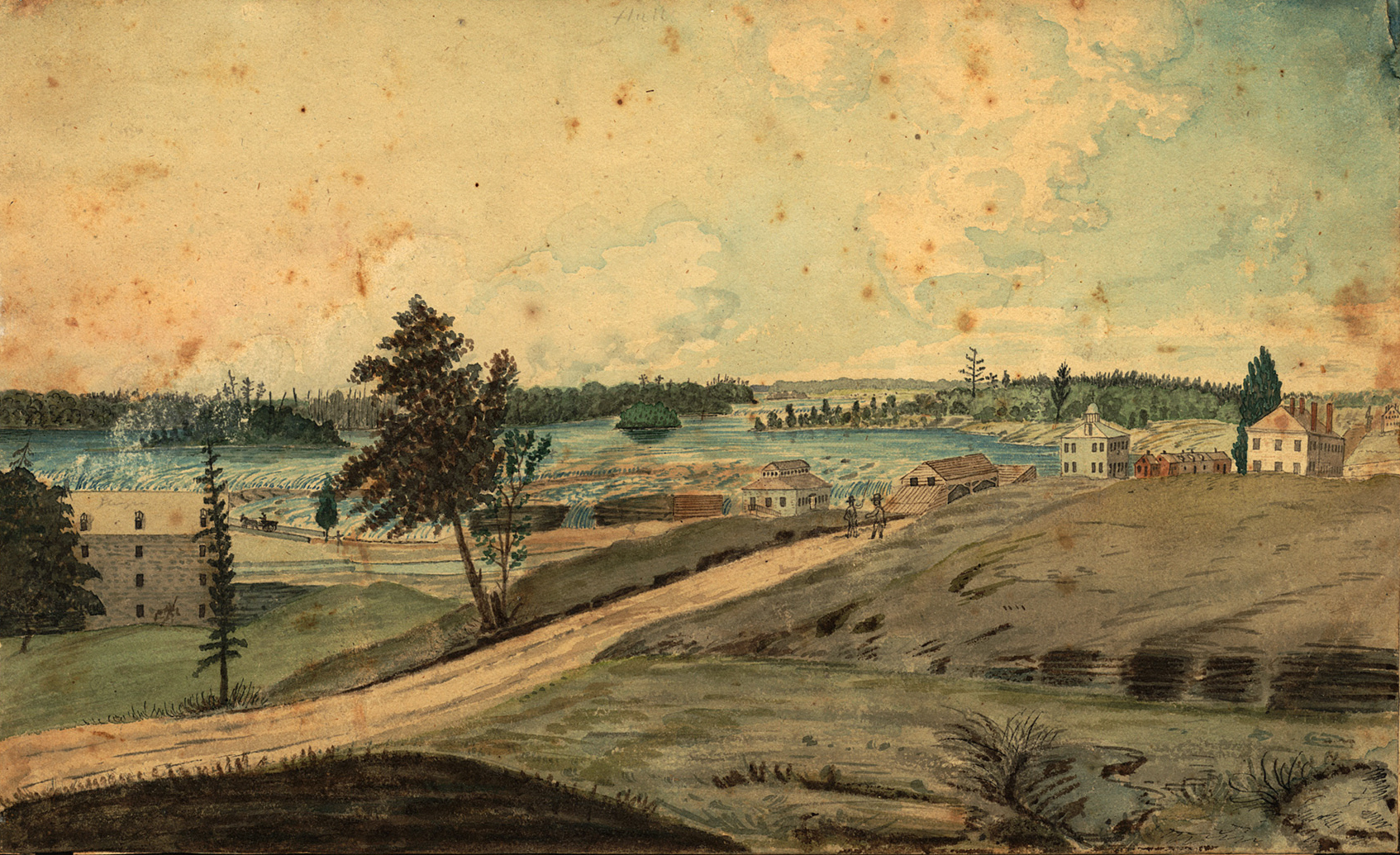
Painting of Hull by Thomas Burrowes, with the Chaudière Falls and Bytown in background, 1830

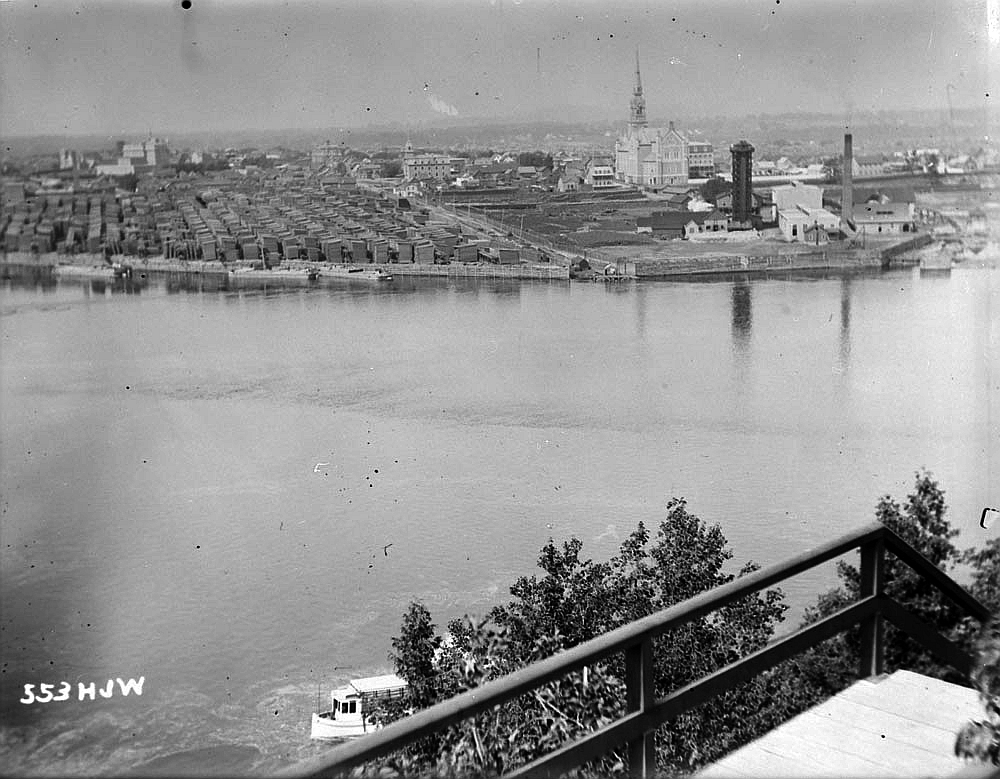
Hull from Ottawa, 1896

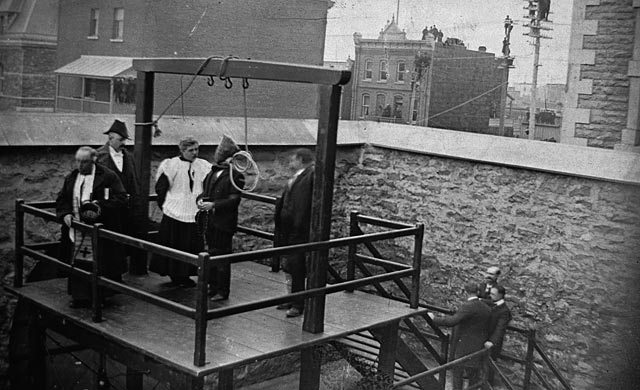
Public execution in Hull, 1902

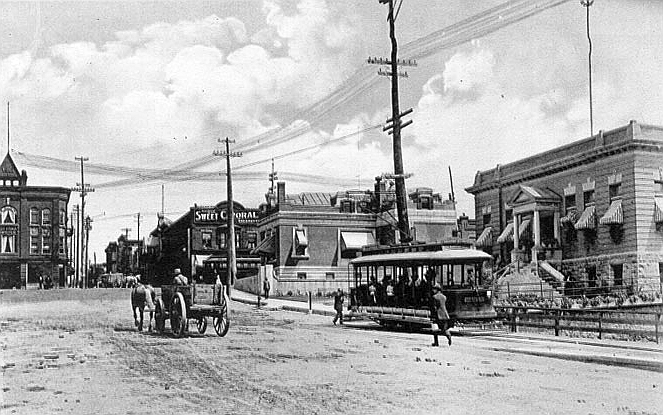
Corner of Main and Bridge streets in Hull, 1905

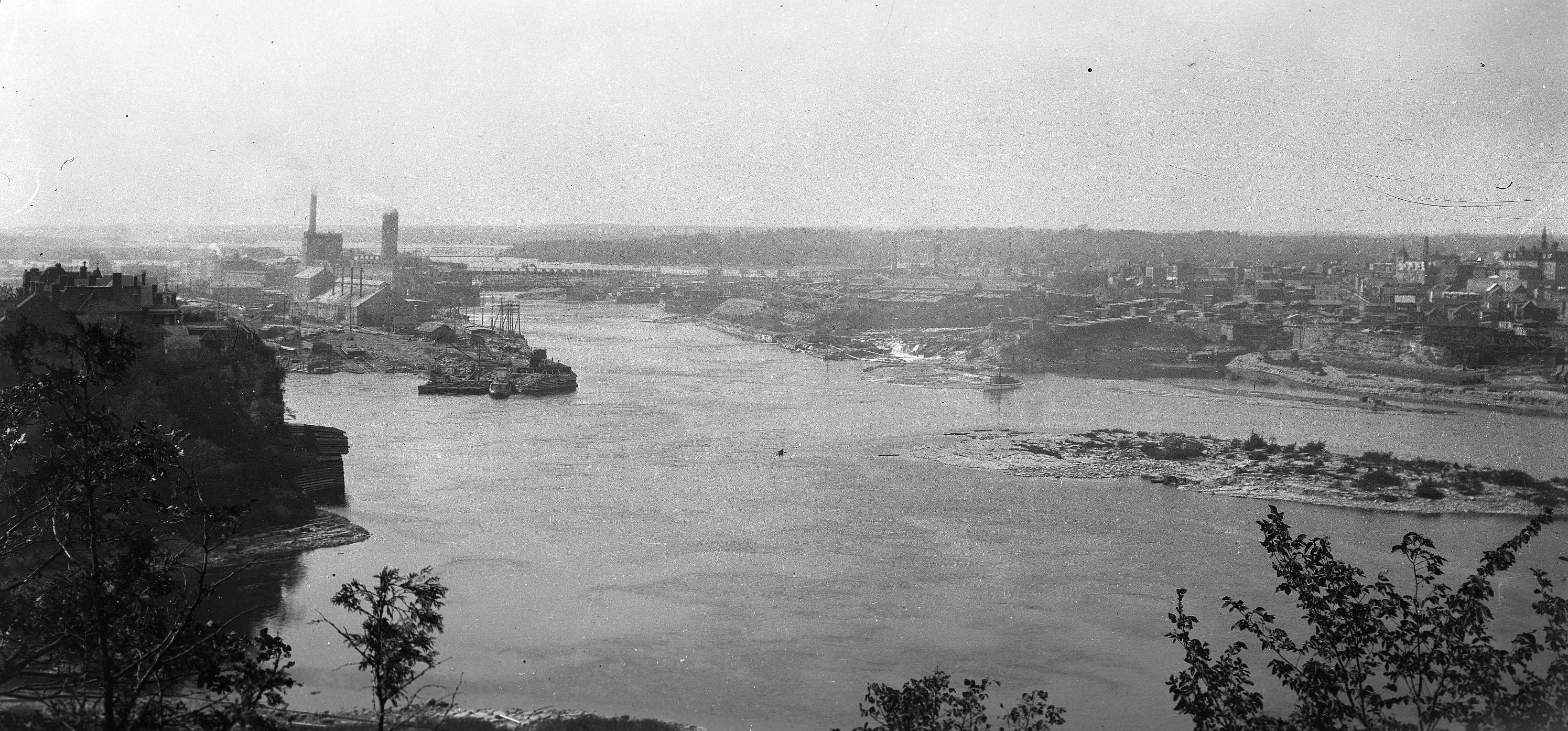
Hull, 1913

Hull is a former municipality in the Province of Quebec and the location of the oldest non-Indigenous settlement in the National Capital Region. Prior to European settlement, various Anishinaabe peoples including the Algonquins inhabited the area. It was founded on the north shore of the Ottawa River in 1800 by Philemon Wright at the portage around the Chaudière Falls just upstream (or west) from where the Gatineau and Rideau rivers flow into the Ottawa. Wright brought his family, five other families and twenty-five labourers and a plan to establish an agriculturally based community in what was a mosquito-infested wilderness. Soon after, Wright and his family took advantage of the large lumber stands and became involved in the timber trade. Originally the place was named Wright's Town, Lower Canada, and the name Wrightville survives as the name of a neighbourhood in Gatineau's Hull district.

The Gatineau River, like the Ottawa River, was very much the preserve of the draveurs, people who would use the river to transport logs from lumber camps to mills downriver. (The Gatineau River flows south into the Ottawa River which flows east to the St Lawrence River near Montreal.) The log-filled Ottawa River, as viewed from Hull, appeared on the back of the Canadian one-dollar bill until it was replaced by a dollar coin (the "loonie") in 1987, and the last of the dwindling activity of the draveurs on these rivers ended a few years later.

Ottawa was founded later, as the terminus of the Rideau Canal, built under the command of Lieutenant Colonel John By as part of fortifications and defences constructed after the War of 1812. Originally named Bytown, Ottawa did not become Canada's capital until the mid-19th century after the original Parliament Building in Montreal was torched by a rioting mob of English-speaking citizens on April 25, 1849. Its greater distance from the Canada–US border also left the new Parliament Buildings in Ottawa less vulnerable to foreign attack.

Nothing remains of the original 1800 settlement; the downtown Vieux-Hull sector was razed by a destructive fire in 1900 which also destroyed the original pont des Chaudières (Chaudière Bridge), a road bridge which has since been rebuilt to join Ottawa to Hull at Victoria Island.

=== 1917 to 2000 ===
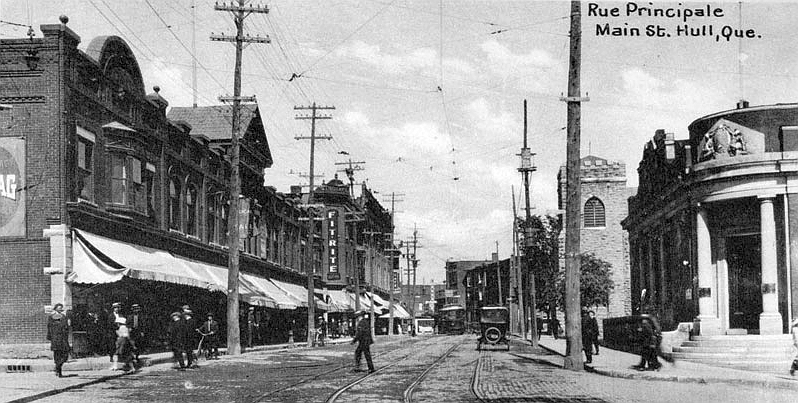
Rue Principale in Hull, 1920

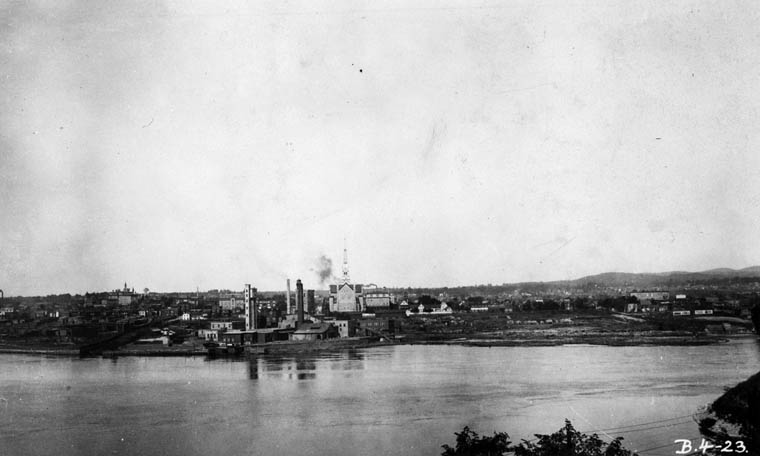
Hull from Parliament Hill, c. 1923-1924

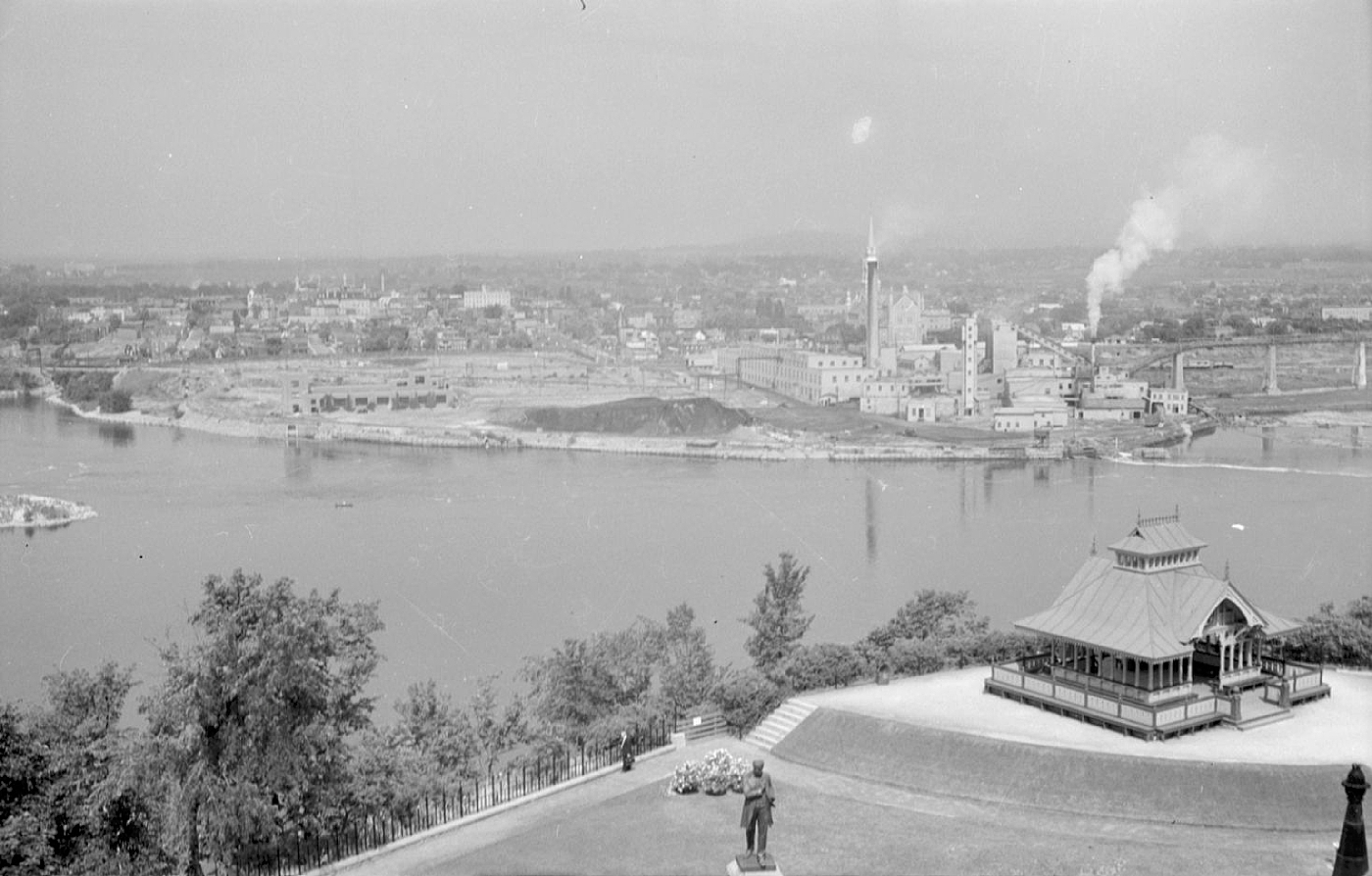
Hull as seen from Ottawa in 1938

Hull was noted for its nightlife during the years 1917 to 2000.

Prohibition on the sale of alcohol in Ontario began in 1916, and continued until the repeal of the Ontario Temperance Act in 1927. Hull's proximity to Ontario made it a convenient place for people from Ottawa to consume alcohol, and a sharp increase in arrests for drunk and disorderly conduct was noted in Hull in 1917. As a result, in May 1918, Hull enacted local laws prohibiting the sale of alcohol. This led to a dramatic increase in bootlegging in Hull, and the town gained the nickname le Petit Chicago, because its per capita crime rates were similar to those in Chicago. In 1919, a local plebiscite repealed Hull's prohibition laws, causing Hull's drinking establishments to once again thrive as a result of the continued prohibition in neighbouring Ontario. Most of Hull's bars were conveniently located near the Alexandra Bridge to Ottawa, which a local newspaper called, "the bridge of the thousand thirsts".

Hull's Chief of Police stated in 1924 that the cause of Hull's lawlessness was its proximity to Ottawa, and a report published in 1925 found that visitors to Hull accounted for up to 90 percent of its bar patrons, as well as the vast majority of those arrested for drunk and disorderly conduct. A newspaper in the 1920s stated, "these taverns, which are Hull's sole attraction, are not bar rooms, but barn-like, dim rooms in old buildings".

During the early 1940s—when bars in Ontario closed at 1 am and bars in Quebec closed at 3 am—residents of Ontario continued to take advantage of Quebec's more liberal policies on alcohol control. An official inquiry in the 1940s found that gambling houses and illegal bars in Hull were receiving protection from corrupt local politicians, who also encouraged police not to arrest prostitutes.

During World War II, Hull, along with various other regions within Canada, such as the Saguenay, Lac Saint-Jean, and Île Sainte-Hélène, had Prisoner-of-war camps. Hull's prison was simply labelled with a number and remained unnamed just like Canada's other war prisons. The prisoners of war (POWs) were sorted and classified into categories by nationality and civilian or military status. In this camp, POWs were mostly Italian and German nationals. During the Conscription Crisis of 1944 the prison eventually included Canadians who had refused conscription. Also, prisoners were forced into hard labour which included farming the land and lumbering.

The Macdonald-Cartier Bridge was constructed in 1965, pushing many of Hull's bars to streets north. A large office complex known as Place du Portage began construction in the 1970s, uprooting many businesses along what was once the town's main commercial area, and displacing some 4,000 residents.

The disco era of the 1970s ushered in new prosperity for Hull's nightlife, and "Viva Disco" was named in Playboy magazine's top ten in North America.

In the early 1980s, Hull City Council began encouraging the expansion of bars in the downtown area. Bars in Hull continued to remain open two additional hours compared to bars in Ontario, and some bars offered a shuttle service from Ottawa.

By 1985, Hull had the highest crime rate in Quebec, with offences in the bar district including murder, drug dealing, rowdiness, violence, noise, vandalism and drunkenness.

The Canadian Museum of History relocated nearby in 1989, and politicians in Hull expressed concern about the city's image. Official committees in Hull weighed the job creation and profitability of Hull's nightlife, against the costs of policing and cleanup. A "zero tolerance" campaign began in 1990, which involved undercover policing, the revocation of liquor licences, and a public awareness campaign to inform young drinkers in Ontario that disorderly behaviour would not be tolerated in Hull. Soon, police in Hull were aggressively towing illegally parked cars, and individuals caught urinating in public were fined as much as $400.

By 2000, Hull had spent considerable resources making the downtown more attractive, and the decaying old core of Hull was transformed by demolition and replacement with a series of large office complexes. Most of the bars on the Hull strip were gone, and were replaced by restaurants, cafés and stores. The city also provided funds to businesses that wanted to renovate. This resulted in a 75 percent drop in crime in the former bar district from 1994 to 2000, and the main street "was no longer attracting large crowds looking for a fight". Prostitution was not affected. Mayor Yves Ducharme expressed a desire to attract residents back to downtown Hull, and encouraged the construction of studio and bachelor apartments on Promenade du Portage, across from the federal government buildings.

Former Canadian Prime Minister Brian Mulroney wrote of Hull:

The town [Ottawa] visibly sagged by ten at night, just in time for residents seeking relief from the stifling boredom to cross the bridge to Hull, Quebec, where nightclubs, dancehalls, bars, and a few great restaurants provided sanctuary and stimulation.

=== Amalgamation ===
In 2002, the Parti Québécois, leading the provincial government, merged the cities of Hull, Gatineau, Aylmer, Buckingham and Masson-Angers into one city. Although Hull was the oldest and most central of the merged cities, the name Gatineau was the only original city name among the five final names offered as choices for the amalgamated city. Additionally, the pre-merger city of Gatineau had almost twice the population of the pre-merger city of Hull. A majority of the residents of all five cities chose Gatineau.

In 2004, there was a referendum to decide whether Hull would remain in Gatineau. The majority of those who voted in Hull voted against the de-amalgamation, and the status quo prevailed.

== Geography ==
Hull is located at the confluence of the Gatineau and Ottawa rivers.

Navigation beyond Ottawa-Hull on the Ottawa River is still difficult as watercraft must be removed from the Ottawa River due to obstacles posed by rapids such as the Rapides des Chaudières or "Kettle Rapids".

== Demographics ==
Prior to amalgamation in 2002, Hull's population was 66,246 (2001 Census of Canada). According to the Canada 2011 Census, Hull had a population of 69,004.

Approximately 80% of residents speak French as their first language and about 9% English as their first language (2001 Census of Canada).

== Education ==
Commission Scolaire des Portages-de-l'Outaouais (CSPO) operates Francophone public schools.

Western Québec School Board operates Anglophone public schools.

== Economy ==
Hull now depends primarily on the civil service as an economic mainstay. A number of federal and provincial government departments are located here. The policy of the federal government to distribute federal jobs on both sides of the Ottawa River led to the construction of several massive office towers to house federal civil servants in the 1970s and 80s; the largest of these are Place du Portage and Terrasses de la Chaudière, occupying part of what had been the downtown core of Hull.

Two paper mills (Scott Paper and the E. B. Eddy division of Domtar) still retain some industrial facilities on the Ottawa River in the centre of Hull, Quebec.

Hull is also the home to the Casino du Lac-Leamy and to the Canadian Museum of History directly opposite Parliament Hill. Hull is also Outaouais's cultural centre.

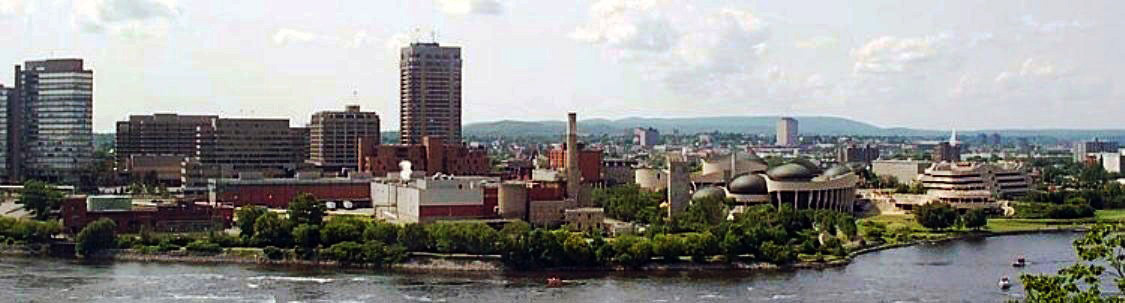
Place du Portage, Place du Centre, Scott Paper, and Museum of History along the Ottawa River in Hull

== Notable people ==
- Derick Brassard (born 1987), professional ice hockey player
- Philippe DioGuardi (born 1961), tax lawyer
- Catherine Martin (born 1958), screenwriter and director
- Bernie Guindon, founder Satan's Choice MC
- George Kourounis, adventurer
- Daniel Lanois (born 1951), Canadian record producer and musician
- Michel Larocque (born 1952), professional ice hockey player

== See also ==
- List of crossings of the Ottawa River
- List of former cities in Quebec
- Municipal reorganization in Quebec
