= Zoë Mace =

English classical-crossover singer

Zoë Mace is an English classical-crossover singer from Oxfordshire.

== Biography ==
Zoë started her singing career at the age of nine when she recorded her first CD Little Ray of Light in October 2004, to raise funds for the New Oxford Children's Hospital, as a token of gratitude to the doctors and nurses who had looked after her sister, Jodie. Jodie was born with Down syndrome and a heart defect, and was due to have open heart surgery on 2 March 2005.

The album was released on 8 November throughout Zoë's hometown of Oxfordshire. All 5,000 copies sold in just 5 weeks raising £27,000 for the hospital campaign. Zoë's second album, released age 10, Songs for My Sister, reached number two in the classical album chart in its first week. The album raised £100,000 for the Down's Syndrome Association and other charities relating to Jodie's condition. Jodie died following her heart surgery, though continues to be Zoë's inspiration to raise awareness for Down's Syndrome and other disabilities.

On 19 November 2007, Zoë's third album, Once Upon a Time (produced by Andy Whitmore) was released, featuring a duet with the New Zealand tenor Geoff Sewell.

Zoë went on to study BMus Music degree at King's College London and a master's degree at RADA and Birkbeck University.

In October 2017, Zoë won a competition to be a guest soloist at Celtic Woman's World Tour, 'Voices of Angels', performing a solo at the London Palladium.
