= Olena Muravyova =

Russian opera singer (1867–1939)

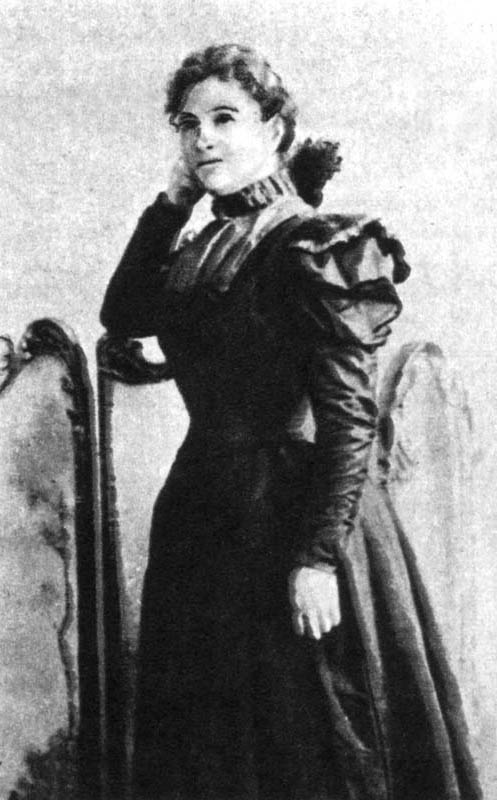

Olena Oleksandrivna Muravyova (Ukrainian: Олена Олександрівна Муравйова; 3 June 1867 – 11 March 1939) was a Soviet and Ukrainian opera singer and vocal teacher. For more than 30 years of musical and educational activities in Kyiv, she emerged as a prominent expert in vocal training, being awarded Merited Art Worker of the Ukrainian SSR and Order of the Red Banner of Labour (both 1938).

== Biography ==
Olena Muravyova was born in Kharkiv and studied at the Moscow Conservatory (1886–1888). From 1890 to 1901, she was a soloist of the Bolshoi Theatre in Moscow. From 1900 she was one of the most renown teachers of voice in Ukraine and schooled over 400 singers, among them Miliza Korjus, Zoia Gaidai, Ivan Kozlovsky, Larissa Rudenko, and Elena Petlyash. Over the years she kept close contact with Mykola Lysenko, Borys Lyatoshynsky, Viktor Kosenko, Levko Revutsky, and other composers of her time. She died in Kyiv in 1939 and is buried at the Baikove Cemetery.
