= René Bertschy =

Swiss bassist and vocalist

René Bertschy (January 11, 1912, in Bern – November 28, 1999, in Zürich) was a Swiss jazz double-bassist and vocalist.

Bertschy played with the Harlem Kiddies from 1935 to 1939, during which time the group toured throughout Europe, and recorded with Coleman Hawkins in 1937. He enlisted in the Swiss military during World War II, and concomitantly worked with Teddy Stauffer and Lanigiros. Following the war he formed an ensemble called the Continentals, which played throughout Europe and was active into the 1960s.

Bertschy was married to Kitty Ramon, a vocalist who performed with Bertschy in an ensemble called the Swing Kiddies.
