= Yannchen Hoffmann =

Luxembourgish mezzo-soprano (born 1961)

Yannchen Hoffmann (born 21 July 1961) is a Luxembourgish mezzo-soprano. Her father is composer Julien Hoffmann.
