= Philippe DioGuardi =

Canadian tax lawyer

Philippe DioGuardi is a Canadian tax lawyer. His practice is focused exclusively on remediation of problems with tax compliance and collection issues, and was among the first in Canada to offer the opportunity of a lawyer-protected tax amnesty for serious penalties and risk of prosecution associated with unreported income and years of unfiled back taxes. He is also an author and co-wrote with his father The Taxman Is Watching, which was on the Canadian business bestseller book list for 10 weeks.

== Background ==
DioGuardi was born in Hull, Quebec (now Gatineau, Quebec) in 1961. His mother is French Canadian with roots in Quebec dating back to the 1700s. His father, Paul DioGuardi, an English Canadian from Ottawa, was a law student at the university in Kingston, Ontario. He grew up fluent in English and French. His father took his call to the bar and worked in investigations with the Canada Revenue Agency, and thereafter for the Department of Justice, representing the tax agency in complex and high level criminal and international cases. As a boy DioGuardi often shared family dinners with CRA auditors and investigators, and even tax court judges. Eventually his father left the public sector to establish a private tax law practice in Ottawa.

== Career ==
DioGuardi attended University of Ottawa Law School, earning degrees in both common law (LLB) the Civil Code of Quebec (LL.L). Called to the bar in Ontario and the Barreau du Québec, DioGuardi entered into private practice as a tax litigator, representing clients in civil and criminal matters in both languages in both Ontario and Quebec.

In 2004 he joined with his father to create a law firm focused exclusively on the resolution of taxpayer delinquencies and conflicts with the tax authorities. The DioGuardi Tax Law firm was among the first in Canada to assist taxpayers in the filing of a tax amnesty (voluntary disclosure) to resolve unreported income and unfiled back taxes. Originally located in downtown Ottawa, the firm set up offices in downtown Toronto in 2003, suburban Mississauga in 2007, and Vancouver, British Columbia in 2008.

In 2015, DioGuardi was found guilty of professional misconduct and fined $5,000 along with $75,000 costs and a six-week suspension.

== Books ==
In 2008, DioGuardi and his father co-authored The Taxman Is Watching, published by HarperCollins Canada. The book was on the Canadian business bestseller list for 10 weeks.

DioGuardi and his father have been frequent guests on television and radio interview shows including: CBC Radio One: Ontario Today, the Ted Woloshyn show on Talk Radio 1010 in Toronto, the Stephen LeDrew television show on CityTV, and national and local newspapers including the Toronto Star, the National Post, and the Globe and Mail. The two have been quoted in newspaper and magazine articles.
