= Zoia Gaidai =

Soviet and Ukrainian opera soprano (1902–1965)

Zoia Gaidai Зоя Гайдай
- Born: 1 June 1902; Tambov, Russian Empire (present-day Russia)
- Died: 21 April 1965 (aged 62) Kiev, Ukrainian SSR, Soviet Union
- Genres: Classical
- Occupation: Singer
- Instrument: Singing

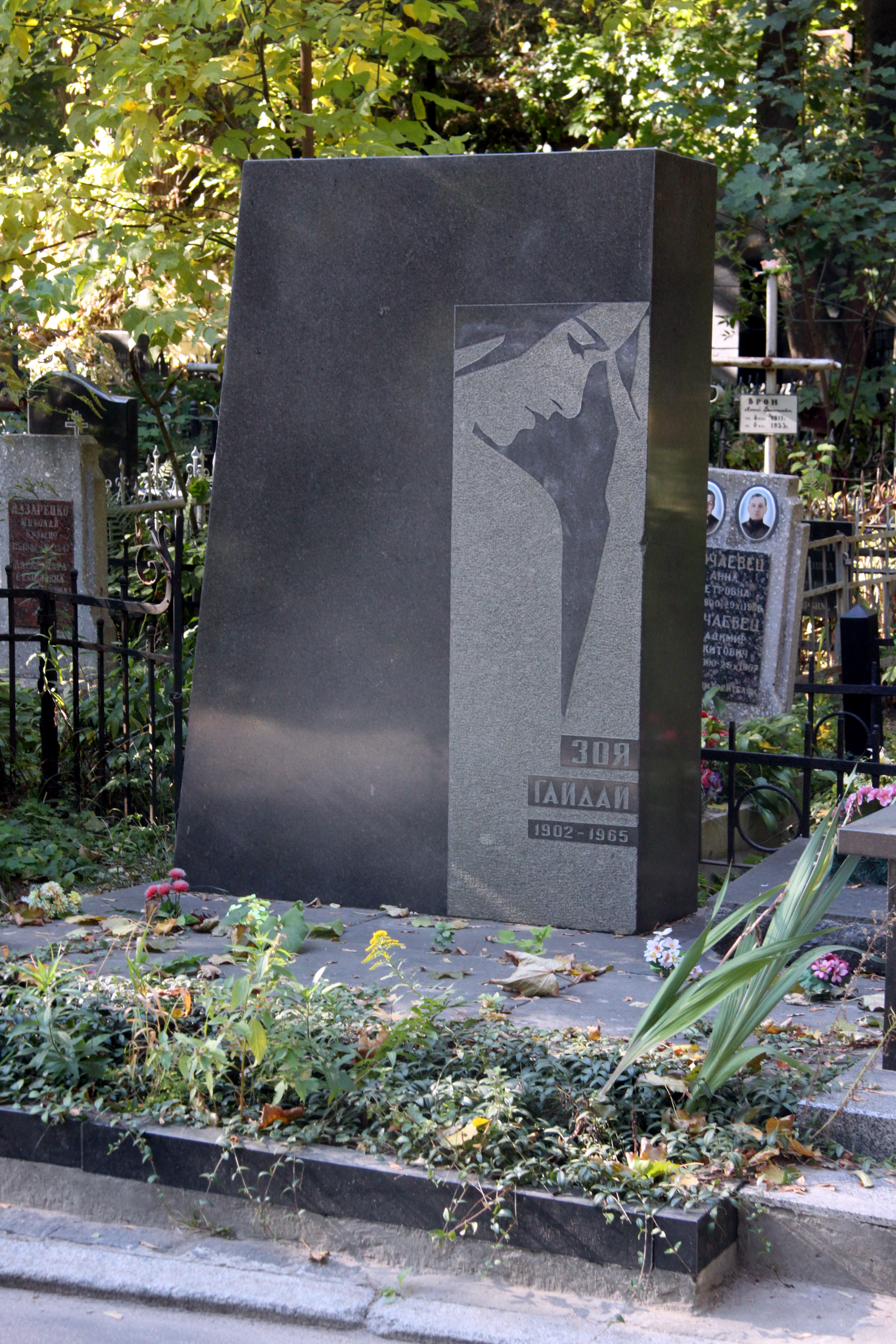
Her grave at Baikove Cemetery, Kyiv

Zoia Mykhailivna Gaidai (Note: Ukrainian: Зоя Михайлівна Гайдай, romanized: Zoia Mykhailivna Haidai, russified: Gaidai) (June 1 1902 [O.S. May 19] – April 21, 1965) was a Soviet and Ukrainian opera soprano. She was an artist of wide creativity, with a bright vocal range and talent who staged more than 50 musicals of the works of Ukrainian and Russian composers, as well as works of the classical repertoire of Western European composers. She kept close contact with other composers of her time, such as Mykola Lysenko, Boris Lyatoshynsky, Viktor Kosenko, and Levko Revutsky.

== Biography ==
Gaidai was born in Tambov. In 1927, Gaidai graduated from the Tambov Music College (N. V. Lysenko Institute of Music and Drama), where she studied under the guidance of Olena Muravyova. From 1928 to 1955, she was soloist at the Kiev Opera and Ballet Theater, and from 1930 to 1934 at the Kharkov theater. During World War II she was evacuated to Ufa along with her husband, singer-tenor Nikolai Platonov (Nicholas Platonovich Slutsky), and other artists of the Kiev Opera.

From 1947 to 1965, she taught at the Kiev Conservatory, having become a professor of this institution in 1963, a position that she held until her death. She toured extensively throughout the borders of the USSR, in Iraq, Iran, China, Canada, United States, and Pakistan, and was awarded two orders, and also received the State Prize of the USSR in 1941. Among her main roles as performer is Natalka, from Natalka Poltavka by Mykola Lysenko, Oksana, from The Zaporozhets Beyond the Danube by Gulak-Artemovskii), and Liuba Shevtsova, from The Young Guards by Yuliy Meitus. As part of the classical repertoire, she also appeared in Tchaikovsky's Eugene Onegin as Tat’iana, as the lead character of Rimsky-Korsakov's The Snow Maiden, Cio-Cio-San in Puccini's Madame Butterfly, and Violetta from Verdi's La Traviata. In 1955, Gaidai left the scene. She died on April 21, 1965 in Kyiv.
