= Patrizia (singer) =

- Also known as: Casta Dioguardi
- Born: Patrizia Dioguardi; San Giovanni Teatino, Italy
- Genre: operatic rock
- Occupation: Rock soprano
- Label: Panda Digital
- Website: www.patriziamusic.com

Patrizia (born Patrizia Dioguardi) is an Italian-Canadian independent musical artist with a 4 octave voice who created and performs operatic rock with the nickname of the female Freddie Mercury for her powerful and dynamic stage performances.. She is the recipient of a 2004 SOCAN award and was a finalist in the Toronto Emergenza competition. Patrizia is a musical visionary that some consider a musical genius.

== Early life ==
Patrizia was born in San Giovanni Teatino, Italy, to Mario and Giuseppina Dioguardi. Her family later moved to Thunder Bay, Ontario, Canada, where her father worked as a cleaner at the Thunder Bay International Airport. At age 18, Patrizia decided to move to Toronto to pursue a career in music.

== Career ==
She performed in various rock bands before beginning classical voice lessons with Stephanie Bogle. Patrizia appeared in several operatic productions such as La Traviata, The Magic Flute, La bohème, The Abduction from the Serraglio, Lucia di Lammermoor, and The Impresario. She also worked with director Alisa Palmer, COC's Paula Suozzi, John Hess, Stuart Hamilton, Brahm Goldhamer, Tom Diamond, and Dwight Bennet.

In 2001, her first single "Rage", produced by the singer-songwriter Kenny MacLean (Platinum Blonde), was released at the Toronto Italian Film Festival and her Bravo!FACT-funded video charted at #3 on the Bravo! national charts. In 2004, she received a SOCAN award for her Bravo!FACT-funded video "Temptation", a re-working of Carmen's Habanera for charting at #1 on Bravo! from the album The Edge of Emotion (2005), produced by Paul Milner. The album includes her versions of Der Hölle Rache from The Magic Flute, the Miserere from Il trovatore, Habanera from Carmen, and Ebben? Ne andrò lontana from La Wally.

In 2006, her third Bravo!FACT-funded video "Desperation" a remake of Puccini's "Vissi d'arte" from Toscaagain from the Milner produced album reached at #2 on Bravo!videos national charts and she was featured in a special tribute to Canadian vocalists on Bravo!FACT Presents.

In 2008, Patrizia released her second album, My Beloved which was produced by Steve Thompson. The album features a cover version of Radiohead's "Creep", The Cranberries' "Zombie" and several original tracks co-written with Thompson. The album is dedicated to Patrizia's father Mario who died after a long battle with cancer during the making of the recording. In 2006, GWN Entertainment Magazine named Patrizia one of their 10 "New Women Of Canadiana". In 2010 Patrizia was *Artist of the year 2010 - Toronto Exclusive Magazine Awards

- Best Toronto Pop Song "I Won't Stop Believin" - Toronto Exclusive Magazine Awards
- 10 Best Female Rock Artists 2010 - MadeMan.com

In 2012, Patrizia released a collection in I Am Patrizia CD, that includes the Queen song "Show Must Go On", a dance pop mix "I Won't Stop Believin'", the Carmen aria "Seduction" and one of the most difficult arias ever written Mozart's "Rage, Queen of the Night". The newest tracks were recorded with producer and multi-instrumentalist Tristan Avakian, who has worked with Lauryn Hill, Mariah Carey, Trans Siberian Orchestra and Queen. On "Show Must Go On", Avakian brought in piano player Mike Garson, who gave "Aladdin Sane" its avant garde jazz feel and later worked with Smashing Pumpkins and Nine Inch Nails.

Other tracks on the album were produced by Steve Thompson (Guns N' Roses, Madonna, Whitney Houston), Murray Daigle and Vic Park Productions (Keshia Chanté, Aleesia, Massari), Kenny Maclean (Platinum Blonde) and Paul Milner (Keith Richards, Eddy Grant). Milner brought in the guitarist Kevin Breit whose credits include Norah Jones, Celine Dion, Rosanne Cash, k.d. lang and Lou Reed.

== Discography ==
- Defiance EP (2003)
- The Edge of Emotion (2005)
- My Beloved (2009)
- I Won't Stop Believin' (2010)
- I am Patrizia (2012)
- Rock the Throne (2014)
