= Maria Lytvynenko-Volhemut =

Soviet opera singer, music educator and actor (1892–1966)

Maria Litvinenko-Volgemut
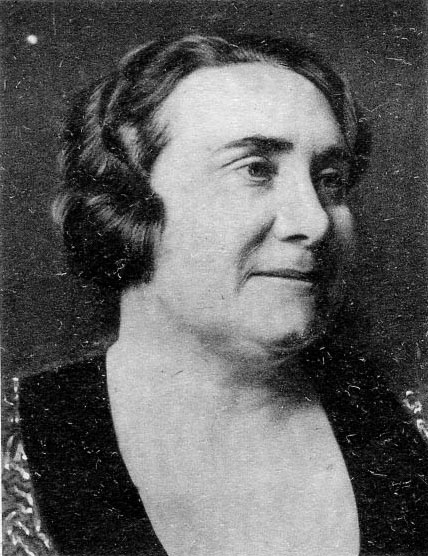
- Born: Maria Ivanivna Litvinenko; February 13, 1892; Kiev, Kiev Governorate, Russian Empire
- Died: April 3, 1966 (aged 74); Kyiv, Ukrainian SSR, Soviet Union
- Resting place: Baikove Cemetery
- Political party: Communist Party of the Soviet Union (since 1944)
- Spouse: H. Volgemut
- Awards: People's Artist of the USSR (1936); State Stalin Prize (1946); and others

Maria Ivanivna Litvinenko-Volgemut (Ukrainian: Марія Іванівна Литвиненко-Вольгемут; 13 February 1892 – 3 April 1966) was a Ukrainian opera singer and music teacher. She was named People's Artist of the USSR in 1936 and awarded the Stalin Prize in 1946.

== Biography ==
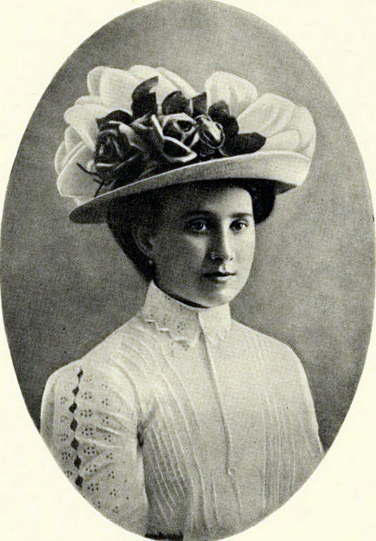
Maria Litvinenko-Volgemut in 1912.

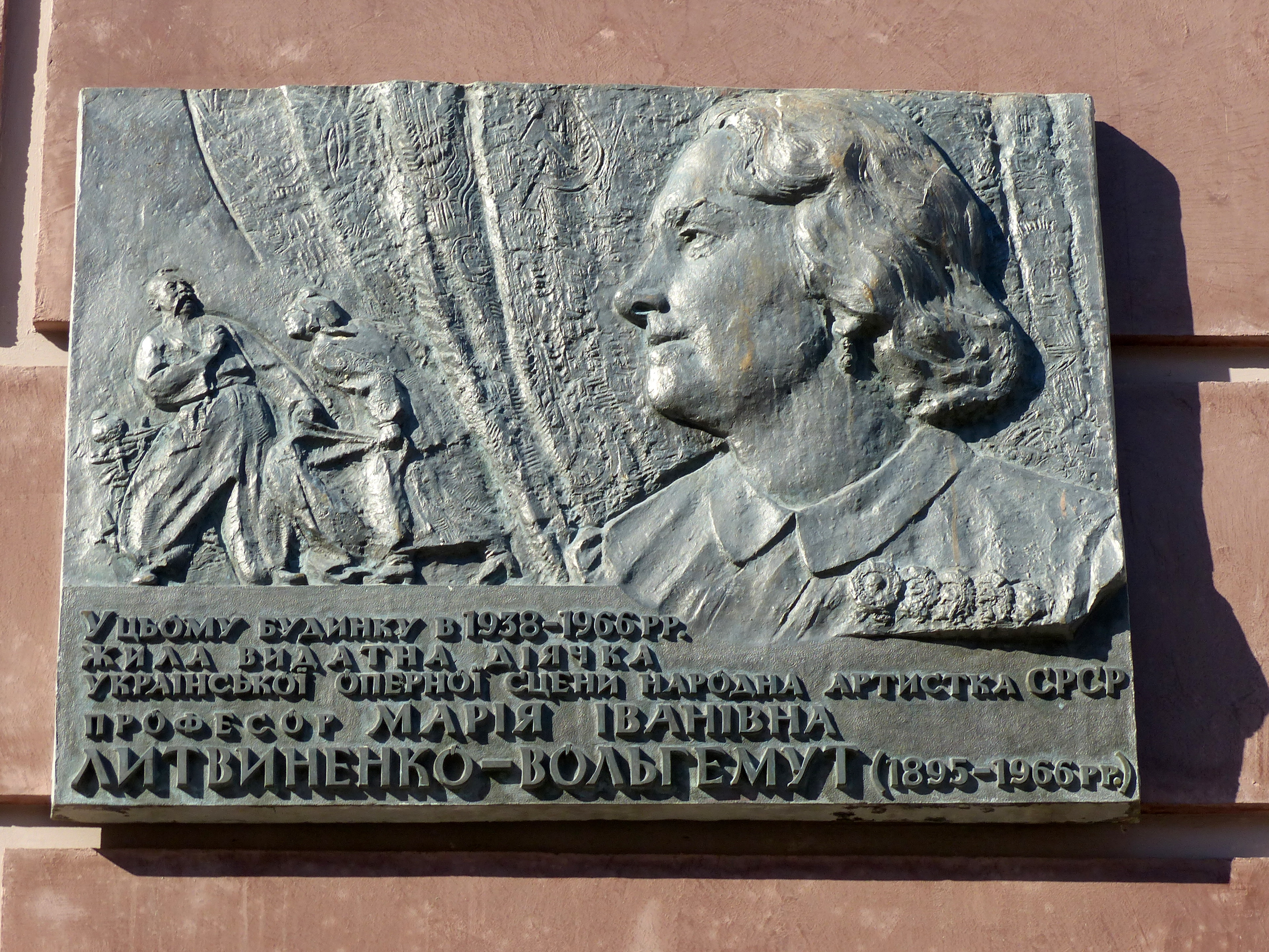
Commemorative plaque of Maria Litvinenko-Volgemut.

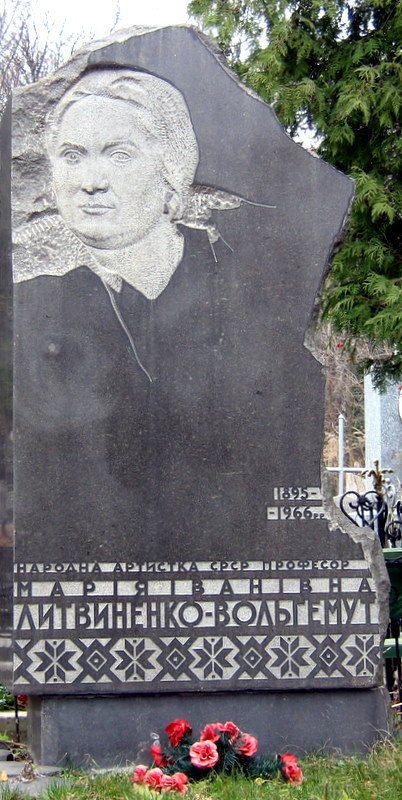
Grave of Maria Litvinenko-Volgemut.

Maria Litvinenko was born in Kiev, then part of the Russian Empire, on 13 February 1892, in the family of a worker of the Arsenal Factory.

From the age of seven she sang in the church choir, where she learnt solfeggio.

In 1912, she graduated from the Kiev School of Music of the Russian Musical Society (vocal class of M. Alekseeva-Yunevich).

In 1912–1914, she performed at the M. Sadovsky Theater in Kiev.

In 1914–1916, she performed at the Theater of Musical Drama in Petrograd (present-day Saint Petersburg).

In 1919, she was part of the first opera theater in Kiev, the Musical Drama (Kiev), with Les Kurbas and Anatol Petrytsky.

In 1920-1922 she was a soloist of a troupe organized by her, the "First Labor Cooperative of Ukrainian Artists" in Vinnytsia.

In 1923–1935, she was a soloist of the Ukrainian State Capital Opera (now the Kharkiv State Academic Opera and Ballet Theatre named after Mykola Lysenko).

In 1935-1953 she was a soloist of the National Opera of Ukraine. During the World War II they were evacuated to Ufa (1941-1942) and then to Irkutsk (1942-1944). During this period, she performed for the Red Army.

In 1944-1964 she taught at the Kiev Conservatory.

Maria Ivanovna Litvinenko-Volgemut died on 3 April 1966 in Kiev and buried in the Baikove Cemetery.

== Awards ==
- People's Artist of the USSR (1936)
- Stalin Prize (1946) for outstanding achievements in (soprano) opera performance.
- Order of Lenin (1946)
- Order of the Red Banner of Labour (1936, 1948, 1951)
