= 2004 Kyiv court explosion =

2004 bombing at a court building in Kyiv, Ukraine

- Location: 50.42567653522058°N 30.657736400985634°E; Darnytsya District Court, 14 Sevastopolska Street, Kyiv, Ukraine
- Date: 9 February 2004 c. 11:45 local time
- Attack type: Improvised explosive device (timer-activated)
- Deaths: 0
- Injuries: 11–16
- Perpetrators: Three convicted (organiser and two accomplices)
- Motive: Obstruction of justice; prevention of a criminal sentencing hearing
- Verdict: Organiser: 10.5 years; accomplices: 9 years each
- Convictions: Terrorist act (Art. 258 Criminal Code of Ukraine)

The 2004 Kyiv court explosion was a deliberate bombing at the Darnytsya District Court in Kyiv, Ukraine, on 9 February 2004. An improvised explosive device concealed inside the building detonated at approximately 11:45 local time, injuring between eleven and sixteen people and causing extensive structural damage to the premises. The attack was subsequently established to have been organised with the sole purpose of disrupting a scheduled court hearing at which a verdict in a pending armed-robbery case was expected to be delivered. Three perpetrators were convicted of terrorism in July 2005.

== Background ==
The Darnytsya District Court is situated at 14 Sevastopolska Street in the eastern residential district of Darnytsya, Kyiv. At the time of the bombing, a criminal trial involving a charge of armed robbery (razboynoye napadeniye) was ongoing at the court, with a sentencing hearing scheduled for the morning of 9 February 2004. The defendant in the robbery case faced a potential custodial sentence of up to ten years.

== The bombing ==
=== Explosion ===
At 11:43 local time on 9 February 2004, a report of an explosion at the Darnytsya District Court was transmitted via the emergency telephone line to the Kyiv Police Main Department. The blast occurred at approximately 11:45–11:46 local time in the basement or ground-floor area of the three-storey court building. Some accounts described two successive detonations within the building.

The explosion destroyed a large section of the building's front facade; at first-floor level, an opening approximately two to three metres in diameter was blown through the external wall. The blast wave shattered windows in adjacent residential buildings. The courtroom used for hearings sustained damage. Prior to the detonation, a duty police officer stationed inside the building had detected the characteristic smell of carbide — a compound used in metal-cutting and welding — which is indicative of the presence of certain explosive materials. Initial reports also considered the possibility that a gas cylinder had exploded during renovation works, but the court's deputy chairman denied that any such works were in progress.

=== Explosive device ===
According to the investigation completed prior to trial, the perpetrators planted a plastic bottle filled with explosive material and equipped with a clockwork timer inside the first-floor toilet of the court building on the morning of 9 February 2004. The device detonated approximately thirty minutes after it was concealed. Law enforcement sources estimated the explosive yield at approximately 1.5 to 3 kilograms in TNT equivalent. One source reported that the explosive force created an opening measuring approximately two by three metres in the exterior wall.

=== Casualties ===
Eleven people sustained bodily injuries of varying severity and were all hospitalised at the Kyiv City Emergency Medical Care Hospital. The injured included six court employees — among them secretaries, assistant judges, and student interns — as well as visitors and parties to proceedings taking place that day. Two of the wounded were initially assessed as being in serious condition. Some sources reported the total number of injured as fifteen or sixteen rather than eleven. There were no fatalities; the absence of deaths was attributed by contemporaneous commentators to fortunate circumstance given the scale of the explosion.

The court had not been conducting hearings at the time of the blast; only staff and no unsupervised members of the public were present inside the building.

== Immediate response ==
Emergency services deployed approximately nine to ten ambulances, fire and rescue teams, police units, and bomb-disposal sappers to the scene. All occupants were evacuated from the three-storey structure, and the surrounding area was cordoned off by police. Debris clearance was temporarily suspended pending a determination of whether additional unexploded devices remained inside the building.

The court's deputy chairman, Lyubov Leontovych, publicly denied that any renovation or repair work was underway — an early hypothesis to explain the explosion — and additionally disclosed that a court employee had been threatened in the days before the attack. Witnesses reported observing a black Mercedes motor vehicle departing from the front of the court building immediately after the explosion, leaving hastily as fragments of the collapsed wall fell. In response to the incident, Kyiv police established checkpoints at the main road exits from the city.

Kyiv Mayor Oleksandr Omelchenko arrived personally at the scene. At the national level, President Leonid Kuchma directed Prime Minister Viktor Yanukovych, Prosecutor General Hennadiy Vasyliev, Interior Minister Mykola Bilokon, and Security Service of Ukraine head Ihor Smeshko to institute comprehensive protective measures for judges and to secure all court premises across Ukraine, requiring each official to report back on measures taken.

== Investigation ==
=== Initial charges ===
On 9 February 2004, Kyiv City Prosecutor's Office opened a criminal case against unknown perpetrators under Articles 15 and 115(2)(5) of the Criminal Code of Ukraine, corresponding to the charge of attempted intentional murder committed by a method dangerous to the lives of many persons. A joint investigative task force was formed, incorporating seasoned investigators from the prosecutorial investigative division, criminal investigation detectives from the Kyiv Police Main Department, and officers of the Security Service of Ukraine.

On approximately 12 February 2004, Mayor Omelchenko stated publicly that eleven individuals had been detained in connection with the bombing and that investigators were checking persons with long-standing criminal proceedings before the Darnytsya court. This claim was contradicted by the head of the Kyiv Police Public Relations Centre, Dmytro Andreyev, who stated he had received no information confirming any arrests; the Kyiv Prosecutor's Office press service similarly could not verify the mayor's account. Confirmed police records indicate that three suspects were arrested in two stages: two on 28 February 2004, and a third on 9 March 2004.

On 23 February 2005, more than a year after the bombing, the criminal case was formally reclassified from attempted murder to terrorism under Article 258 of the Criminal Code of Ukraine.

=== Reconstruction of events ===
The investigation established the following sequence of events. On the evening of 8 February 2004 — the day preceding the scheduled verdict hearing — the organiser of the plot met with two acquaintances and proposed that they carry out an explosion at the court building, offering each a total payment of US$1,000 between them. The following morning, all three proceeded to the court building. After surveying the premises, they agreed that the first-floor toilet offered the best concealment for the device, which they placed inside, set the timer, and departed. The explosion occurred approximately thirty minutes later.

Investigators from the Kyiv Prosecutor's Office confirmed that the purpose of the attack was solely to obstruct the delivery of a judicial verdict, and that the organiser was motivated by a desire to prevent his brother — the defendant in the robbery trial — from being sentenced.

== Trial and sentencing ==
The criminal case was tried before the Holosiyivsky District Court of Kyiv. On 19 July 2005, the court delivered its verdict. The 36-year-old organiser of the bombing — the brother of the armed-robbery defendant whose sentencing hearing the attack was intended to prevent — was found guilty and sentenced to ten and a half years' imprisonment. Each of the two accomplices received a sentence of nine years' imprisonment. The brother of the organiser — the person whose robbery trial directly triggered the conspiracy — had previously been convicted separately of the armed-robbery offence and sentenced to more than eight years in prison.

According to the investigating prosecutor, Dmytro Oliynychenko, sufficient evidence had been collected to prove the guilt of all three defendants, and the criminal motive was unambiguously established as the prevention of a judicial ruling rather than any political or ideological objective.

== See also ==
- 2004 Kyiv market bombing
- 2023 Kyiv court explosion
