= 2004 Kyiv market bombing =

- Location: 50.495058°N 30.609797°E; Troieschyna market (Rynok-1), Kyiv, Ukraine
- Date: 20 August 2004 c. 18:15–18:25 local time (EET (UTC+3))
- Attack type: Improvised explosive devices in trash bins
- Deaths: 1 (died in hospital, 24 August 2004)
- Injuries: 14
- Perpetrators: Oleksandr Pastukh, Serhiy Znachko, Dmytro Savchenko, Taras Shvydenko
- Motive: Public destabilisation; anti-immigrant, fascist ideology
- Verdict: 14 years' imprisonment each
- Convictions: Terrorist act (Art. 258 § 3 of the Criminal Code of Ukraine)

The 2004 Troieschyna Market bombings were a series of improvised explosive device attacks that took place on 20 August 2004 at the Troieschyna wholesale clothing and goods market (officially registered as Rynok-1) in the Troieschyna residential district of Kyiv, Ukraine. Two pipe bombs hidden in trash bins detonated within minutes of each other during the evening, wounding fourteen people — including several foreign nationals — and killing one woman who succumbed to her injuries four days later. The attack occurred during the climax of Ukraine's 2004 presidential election campaign, which gave the incident immediate political overtones. Four young Kyiv residents were subsequently convicted of terrorism and sentenced to fourteen years in prison each.

== Background ==
The Troieschyna market was at the time one of the largest wholesale retail markets in Kyiv, operating in a densely populated residential neighbourhood on the left bank of the Dnieper River. In the months preceding the bombings, the market had been at the centre of a fierce ownership dispute. In early December 2003, Valeriy Prychyk — a prominent businessman with close ties to the market's container-trade operations — was murdered. Ukrainian investigators later pointed to his reluctance to surrender lucrative container trade rights as a motive, while press reports noted that competitors with plans for large-scale redevelopment of the site had also been engaged in legal harassment of Prychyk.

Following Prychyk's death, Kyiv city authorities intensified calls for the "reorganisation and reconstruction" of the market, sparking speculation — reported in the newspaper Fakty as early as 3 December 2003 — that powerful business groups intended to replace it with residential, office, and retail complexes on the site and surrounding land.

== The bombings ==
=== First and second explosions ===
On the evening of 20 August 2004, two improvised explosive devices placed inside rubbish bins on the territory of the market detonated with an interval of several minutes. The first explosion, at approximately 18:15 local time, was of relatively small force and concussed two traders. The second explosion, minutes later, was considerably more powerful.

At the time of the blasts the market had largely emptied for the day; those present were mainly stall holders finishing their work and cleaners sweeping the premises. The State Emergency Service press office reported that market cleaning staff bore the brunt of the casualties. Eyewitnesses described the explosions as originating from bins and noted that the injuries were "not burn wounds" but of a shrapnel character. Several eyewitnesses and later official reports confirmed that the devices had been packed with nails and screws, making them fragmentation weapons.

=== Casualties ===
Fourteen people were wounded, of whom eleven were hospitalised. Six were taken to the operating theatre of the city's Shvydka Dopomoha (Emergency Medical Care) hospital; four underwent immediate surgery. Among the injured were two Pakistani nationals; subsequent legal proceedings would confirm that citizens of Pakistan, Bangladesh and Vietnam were among the victims. On 24 August 2004 — four days after the explosion — one of the hospitalised cleanser, Tetyana Lavrynenko, died in hospital from her wounds, bringing the death toll to one.

No fire was reported as a result of the detonations; the market rows were left empty, and the site of the second explosion was cordoned off by police.

== Investigation and arrests ==
=== Immediate response ===
A forensic investigative team from the Kyiv Main Police Department and bomb-disposal specialists were dispatched to the scene immediately. Work was centred around the rubbish bins where the devices had reportedly detonated. Criminal proceedings were opened on the day of the attack, though the initial charge was not publicly disclosed.

=== Detention of suspects ===
On 26 August 2004, Kyiv police announced the arrest of four suspects described as an "organised criminal group": Oleksandr Pastukh, Serhiy Znachko, Dmytro Savchenko, and Taras Shvydenko. The four were all residents of Kyiv aged between 20 and 23. A fifth suspect from the Chernihiv Oblast was detained shortly afterwards.

A female employee of the UNP secretariat, who was also detained, was released without charge and classified as a witness.

=== Confessions and press conference ===
On 28 August 2004, Ukraine's Deputy Minister of Internal Affairs Oleksandr Milenin held a press conference at which he announced that all four detainees had confessed in full. A video showing one suspect's confession was screened. In the recording the suspect stated that he had been motivated by the conviction that "he could do nothing for this country" and dissatisfaction with the socio-political situation, expressing a desire to "make society think".

The official police press release stated that "the motive of the criminal actions was the introduction of destabilisation into society, discrediting the state structures, and attempting to prove to citizens that the authorities were incapable of protecting them."

Police also displayed confiscated physical evidence at the press conference: mobile phones allegedly used to trigger the devices, wallets, nails described as "identical to those used in the explosive devices", plastic tubes, a jar of a chemical mixture, potassium permanganate, and internet printouts with schematics for building explosives. Political leaflets with fascist symbols, materials from the Svoboda nationalist movement, and campaign materials for presidential candidate Viktor Yushchenko were also exhibited.

When journalists asked whether lawyers had been present during the interrogations, police officials stated the suspects had "refused" legal representation.

=== Political dimension and party membership claims ===
At the press conference authorities disclosed that two of the detainees held membership cards of the Ukrainian People's Party (UNP), a party that was part of the pro-Yushchenko Our Ukraine electoral bloc, and that another detainee carried accreditation as an employee of 5 Kanal, a television channel associated with the opposition. The disclosure was made with an implicit suggestion of a link between the suspected terrorists and the political opposition to then-incumbent President Leonid Kuchma.

Deputy Minister Milenin stated: "As two of the detainees admitted, the motive of these crimes was the destabilisation of the situation and the overthrow of the existing state order in Ukraine."

The UNP leadership categorically rejected the allegations. The party's secretary-general Bohdan Sokolovskyi displayed his own party card and stated that the membership card attributed to suspect Oleksandr Pastukh bore a registration number inconsistent with the party's numbering system — concluding it was a forgery. UNP leader Yuriy Kostenko described the events as "an organised provocation" against Yushchenko ahead of the election.

Viktor Yushchenko's campaign chief Roman Bezsmertnyi disputed the claimed party affiliations of the suspects, presenting an alternative account:

Pastukh Oleksandr Anatoliyovych works in the campaign office of presidential candidate Bohdan Boyko, leader of the Rukh za Natsiyu party. Savchenko Dmytro Petrovych, who allegedly works at Channel 5, was previously a bodyguard for Dmytro Korchynskyi when the latter led UNA-UNSO; he is now an activist of the UNA of Eduard Kovalenko. Shvydenko Taras was, until 2003, an activist of the radical group Tryzub. Kovalchuk Natalya currently lives together with Shvydenko Taras.

The Yushchenko campaign characterised the bombings as a government provocation, designed to discredit the main opposition candidate in the final weeks before the election.

== Reclassification of charges and transfer to the SBU ==
On 2 September 2004, the investigation into the market bombings was transferred from the investigative division of the Kyiv Police Main Department to the Security Service of Ukraine (SBU). On 3 September 2004, formal charges were laid against four of the detainees.

On 6 September 2004, the spokesperson of the Prosecutor General of Ukraine Serhiy Rudenko announced at a press conference that the charges had been reclassified. The original charges — Part 4 of Article 296 ("Hooliganism", punishable by 3–7 years' imprisonment) and Article 121 ("Intentional grievous bodily harm", punishable by 5–10 years) — were upgraded to Part 3 of Article 258 of the Criminal Code of Ukraine: "Terrorist act resulting in the death of persons", which carries a sentence of ten years to life imprisonment.

Rudenko confirmed that the investigation had gathered "sufficient evidence" and indicated that the location of one additional suspect was still being established. He also stated that the authenticity of the UNP party membership cards found on two detainees had not yet been examined, and that this was "not a priority" for the investigation at that stage.

== Market closure and traders' protests ==
By resolution of Kyiv city authorities, the market was closed from 21 August 2004 — the day after the bombings. On 25 August, traders from Troieschyna staged a mass demonstration, blocking traffic on surrounding streets and demanding the market be reopened. Police opened criminal proceedings against the picketers for blocking transport arteries. Reports — which were never officially confirmed — stated that two protesters were killed in road incidents caused by the traffic disruption, with several others hospitalised.

The market's director, Serhiy Matyukha, told reporters that all requirements set by the city inspectorate would be met before 6 September, adding: "I hope nobody will be stupid enough to close it again."

Independently, in the days following the bombings, announcements began to be broadcast on the Kyiv metro stating that from 6 September the market would be closed. Neither the market director nor city officials could determine who had ordered the announcement; the director stated there was no official document ordering closure.

== Bombing of the deputy director's residence ==
=== Events of 3 September 2004 ===
In the early hours of 3 September 2004, an improvised explosive device detonated in the entrance hall of an apartment building at 20-V, Radyanska Ukrayiny Avenue (Vynohradar district, Kyiv), where 27-year-old Serhiy Alisymenko — first deputy director of the Troieschyna market — lived with his parents.

According to investigators, at approximately 05:00 the suspect received a phone call from unknown persons falsely claiming to be firefighters, who informed him that his dacha was burning and asked him to bring the keys. Alisymenko drove to the dacha but found it undisturbed. On returning home and entering the building lobby, he pressed the lift call button — at which moment the device detonated, blasting him out into the courtyard.

Explosive specialists assessed that the device — equivalent to approximately 100 grams of TNT — had been placed in or near the post-boxes adjacent to the lift shaft. The explosion destroyed the doors of both passenger lifts on the ground floor and damaged the lift shafts up to the twelfth floor, shattered windows throughout the building and in a school approximately 200 metres away, demolished the door of one apartment and broke the wardrobe behind it.

Alisymenko, despite serious injuries — a closed traumatic brain injury, contusion, burns, and multiple shrapnel wounds — called emergency services, police, and his mother by mobile phone from the scene. A surgical team at the Emergency Medical Care Hospital extracted the only large metal fragment (3×3 cm) from his thigh. His condition was assessed as satisfactory and his life was not in danger.

=== Competing theories ===
The bombing prompted press commentary about the broader context of violence around the market. The newspaper Segodnya reported that in unofficial circles two theories circulated: the redistribution of Valeriy Prychyk's former business interests, and an attempt by the powerful Russian Solntsevskaya criminal organisation to seize control of Troieschyna.

The director of the Troieschyna market, Matyukha, told Fakty: "All these recent events connected with Troieschyna are aimed at 'taking the market'", though he declined to name those he suspected of commissioning the attack.

== Trial and verdict ==
=== Judicial proceedings ===
In March 2005, the SBU head Oleksandr Turchynov announced that the investigation had been completed and the case transferred to court. As a court of first instance, given the gravity of the charges, the case was heard directly by the Kyiv Appellate Court.

During open court hearings a number of procedural irregularities were placed on record. According to a detailed account published by Zerkalo Nedeli:

- SIM cards found at the market scene by Desnyansky district prosecutors during the initial site inspection subsequently disappeared from the evidence files.
- Two market workers who had given testimony as witnesses were summoned to court as attesting witnesses (ponятые), their signatures reportedly appearing under an inspection protocol they had not personally witnessed.
- The suspects had been detained without prior forensic examination, without obtaining mobile network records, and without checking their alibis. Interrogation began five to six hours after physical detention, with the earlier period unrecorded in official protocols.
- Lawyers were told that legal representation "was not mandatory at this stage" and were urged not to insist, in order not to "prolong the proceedings". Defence lawyers were admitted to the case only after it was transferred to the SBU, and only after several interrogations had already taken place.
- Nationalist and fascist computer files were found on a suspect's computer not during the original search or the first official inspection, but during a subsequent review in the investigator's office — a month after seizure, and without seals or tamper-evident markings on the hardware.
- One senior police investigator stated in open court that "the behaviour of the detainees demonstrated that a powerful organisation stood behind them — possibly the SBU itself."

The Zerkalo Nedeli report concluded that after six months of investigation and thirteen volumes of case files, the only conclusive evidence amounted to the defendants' own statements.

=== Verdict of the Kyiv Appellate Court (16 August 2005) ===
On 16 August 2005, judge Valentyna Lyaskovska of the Kyiv Appellate Court delivered her verdict. All four defendants — Oleksandr Pastukh, Serhiy Znachko, Dmytro Savchenko, and Taras Shvydenko — were found guilty of:

- Part 3 of Article 258 of the Criminal Code of Ukraine: Terrorist act resulting in the death of persons;
- Part 1 of Article 261 (in some sources cited as Art. 263): Illegal handling of weapons, ammunition or explosives.

Each defendant was sentenced to 14 years' imprisonment. The sentences were equal for all four, regardless of the different roles alleged in the pre-trial investigation materials: two had physically brought the explosives to the market and detonated them; Shvydenko had constructed the device but had not gone to the market; Savchenko had not participated in preparation or execution but had been present at gatherings where the attack was discussed.

The accused had been held in Lukyanivske SIZO No. 13 throughout the trial period; the year already served was counted toward the fourteen-year sentence.

=== Reaction to the verdict ===
Defence lawyer Oleksandr Bildiukevych (representing Savchenko) accused the judge of partiality, stating she had "acted as a second prosecutor" and had accepted the prosecution's submissions as absolute truth without subjecting them to scrutiny. He prepared a cassation appeal to the Supreme Court of Ukraine and predicted its success.

Defence lawyer Volodymyr Abashin (representing Shvydenko) contended the charges should have been reclassified as "causing grievous bodily harm resulting in death" rather than terrorism. Both defence lawyers cited a statement by SBU head Turchynov that "there is no terrorism" in the defendants' actions. The SBU press secretary Maryna Ostapenko clarified that Turchynov "meant that the explosion was not a terrorist act in the political sense".

Abashin further argued that the defendants' stated motive — "wanting to see people's reaction" and to "assert themselves before peers and society" (described as "youthful maximalism") — was incompatible with the statutory requirement for a terrorism charge, which requires intent to change the constitutional order. He also characterised the materials used as "not explosives but a pyrotechnic substance comparable to a large firecracker".

The question of political motivation remained unresolved at sentencing. While accusations linking the suspects to pro-Yushchenko parties had been dropped during the investigation, materials described as "nationalist in character" remained in the case file and were considered by the judge.

=== UNP court victory ===
On 23 December 2004 — before the verdict — the Kyiv Commercial Court issued a ruling compelling the Ukrainian Interior Ministry to publicly retract its false statements concerning the Ukrainian People's Party's alleged involvement in the bombings. The UNP had brought civil proceedings against the Ministry of Internal Affairs after police exhibited what the party showed to be a forged party membership card at their August 2004 press conference.

=== Supreme Court confirmation (28 March 2006) ===
On 28 March 2006, the Supreme Court of Ukraine reviewed the cassation appeal against the Kyiv Appellate Court's verdict of 16 August 2005 and upheld the sentence. The SBU stated that pre-trial investigation had established the four defendants, motivated by a desire to disturb public order, to intimidate the population, and to draw attention to their intolerant views toward foreign nationals allegedly residing illegally in Ukraine, had conspired to carry out terrorist bombings at Troieschyna market. The devices consisted of tin cans, metal shards serving as fragmentation elements, electric detonators, batteries, and modified mobile phones, and were detonated remotely by mobile telephone.

The Supreme Court's decision confirmed the fourteen-year sentences for each of the four convicted men, making them final.

== In the political context of the 2004 presidential election ==
The bombings and their aftermath unfolded during one of the most politically turbulent periods in modern Ukrainian history. The attack occurred nine weeks before the first round of the 2004 Ukrainian presidential election (31 October), in which opposition candidate Viktor Yushchenko faced off against government-backed Viktor Yanukovych.

The timing, the rapid arrests, the exhibition of opposition literature alongside evidence, and the explicit statements by senior police officers linking the suspects to pro-Yushchenko organisations were seen by the opposition as a deliberate attempt to destabilise the electoral campaign and taint Yushchenko's image. UNP leader Kostenko suggested it was "a prelude" to a forcible scenario of power retention, pointing to statements by the Prosecutor General's office claiming the opposition was preparing a "Georgian scenario" of forcible seizure of power.

The subsequent Orange Revolution — which erupted following fraud in the second round (21 November 2004) and ultimately led to Yushchenko's election victory — rendered the political charges against the suspects moot. The incoming SBU, under Turchynov, found no grounds to reclassify the charges on political grounds, but confirmed there had been no political motive behind the bombings in the partisan sense alleged in 2004.

== See also ==
- 2004 Ukrainian presidential election
- Orange Revolution
- Troieschyna
- Terrorism in Ukraine
- Security Service of Ukraine
- 2012 Dnipropetrovsk explosions
