= Dnipro Academic Drama and Comedy Theatre =

Theatre in Dnipro, Ukraine

- Дніпровський академічний театр драми і комедії
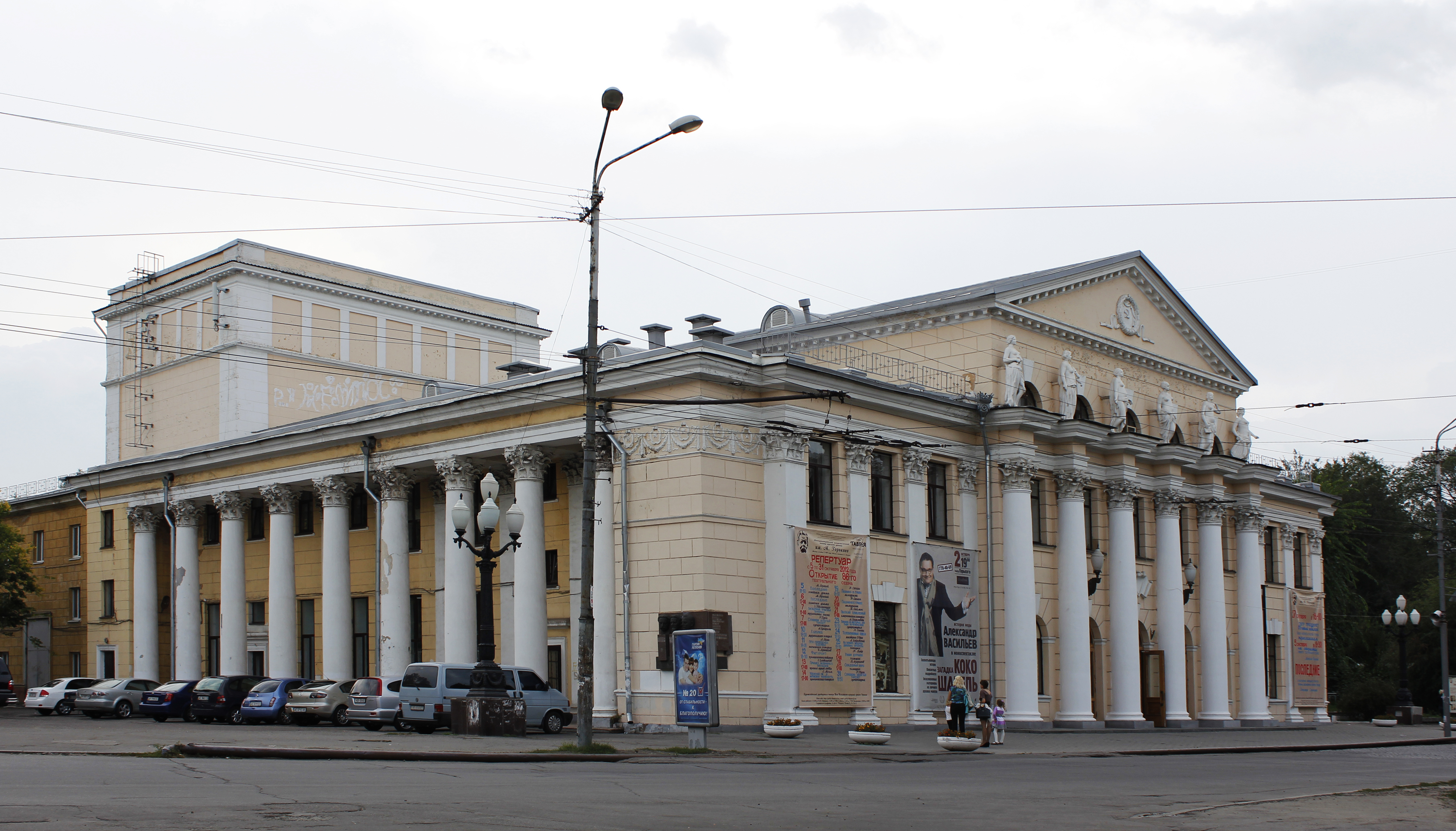
- The theatre in 2012
- Interactive map of Dnipro Academic Drama and Comedy Theatre
- Former names: Gorky Russian Drama and Comedy Theatre
- Address: Dmytro Yavornytsky Ave; Dnipro; Ukraine
- Location: Dnipro, Dnipropetrovsk Oblast, Ukraine
- Coordinates: 48.4706947°N 35.0331986°E

Construction
- Built: 1847
- Opened: 1927
- Rebuilt: 1956

Website
- dramicom.dp.ua

Immovable Monument of National Significance of Ukraine
- Official name: Будинок театру (Theatre Building)
- Type: Architecture
- Reference no.: 040035

The Dnipro Academic Drama and Comedy Theatre (Ukrainian: Дніпровський академічний театр драми і комедії, romanized: Dniprovs'kyi akademichnyi teatr dramy i komedii) is a 19th-century city theatre and an architectural monument in the city of Dnipro, Ukraine. It is one of the city's oldest theatres.

== History ==
A merchant Lutsky supported the construction of the Winter Theatre in 1847. The two-story structure was lavishly furnished. The Moscow Maly Theatre group, consisting of its director Vladimir Ermolov-Borozdin, which was then touring the area, served as the head for the new theatre, which was established on the site of the Lazar Hloba Park in 1927, by a resolution made by the municipal council's executive committee. Konstantin Trenyov's Lyubov Yarova was the first to be performed. In front of 1,200 spectators, Feodor Chaliapin, Leonid Sobinov, and Ivan Patorzhinsky gave performances.

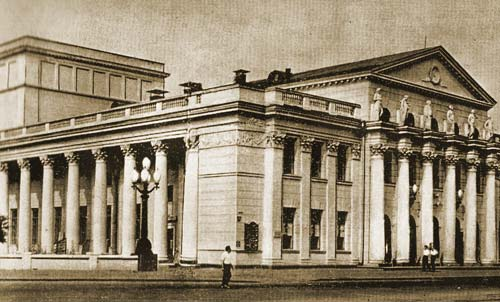
The theatre seen in 1900

Nearly all of Maxim Gorky's works were performed on stage during the late 1920s and early 1930s of the previous century, and in 1927 the theatre was renamed to the Gorky Russian Drama and Comedy Theatre in his honor. Aleksandr Krasnoselsky's concept, which intended to rebuild the theater in a neoclassical style prior to World War II, was never fully implemented.

The theatre was moved to Barnaul during World War II, and after the Wehrmacht departed the city, the building was bombed and mined. The theatre made a comeback to the city in the summer of 1944, with the building and repertory actively restored. The theater was entirely damaged during the war, but it was reconstructed in 1956 to resemble it did before. Within the canon of contemporary drama and comedic theater productions include works by both contemporary and classic authors at the theatre.

In December 2006, it was renamed to its present-day name of Dnipro Theatre of Comedy and Drama. The theatre received the honorific designation of "Academic" in 2007. Serhii Mazani has served as the theatre's creative director since 2018. The theatre's principal director, Anton Serhiiovych Mezhenin, has been carrying on the drama and comedy theatrical traditions since 2021. The theater's boiler room was renovated that same year.

On 10 May 2022, with the involvement of artists from the Dnipro, Kharkiv, and Luhansk regions, the Dnipro Academic Drama and Comedy Theater arranged a unique event on a performance for Ukrainian military and displaced people caused by the Russian invasion of Ukraine. The PrizrenFest festival in Kosovo debuted in July 2023 with the performance Maidan Inferno by the Dnipro Academic Theater of Drama and Comedy.

== Gallery ==
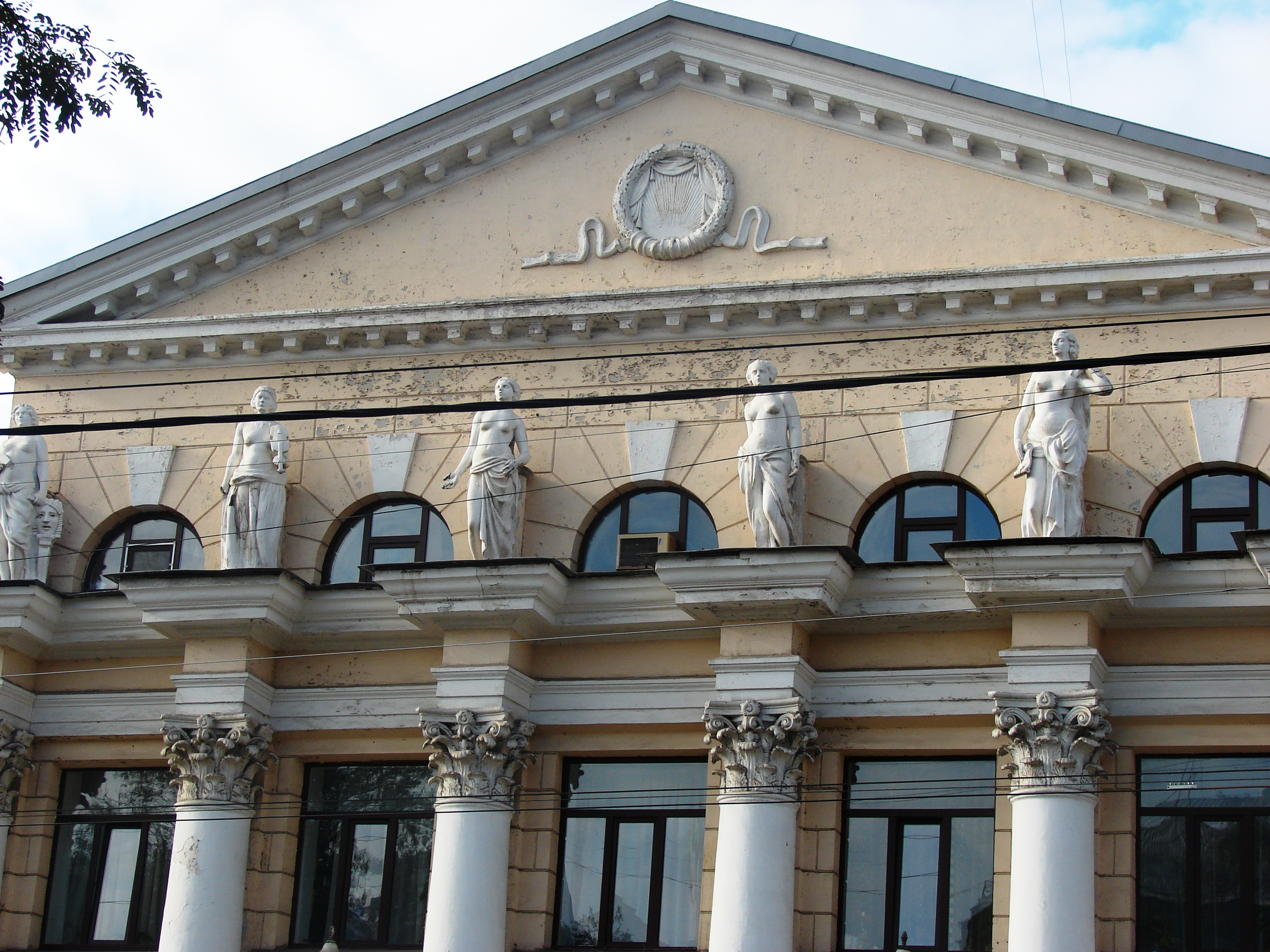
Sculptures on the theatre's exterior in 2006

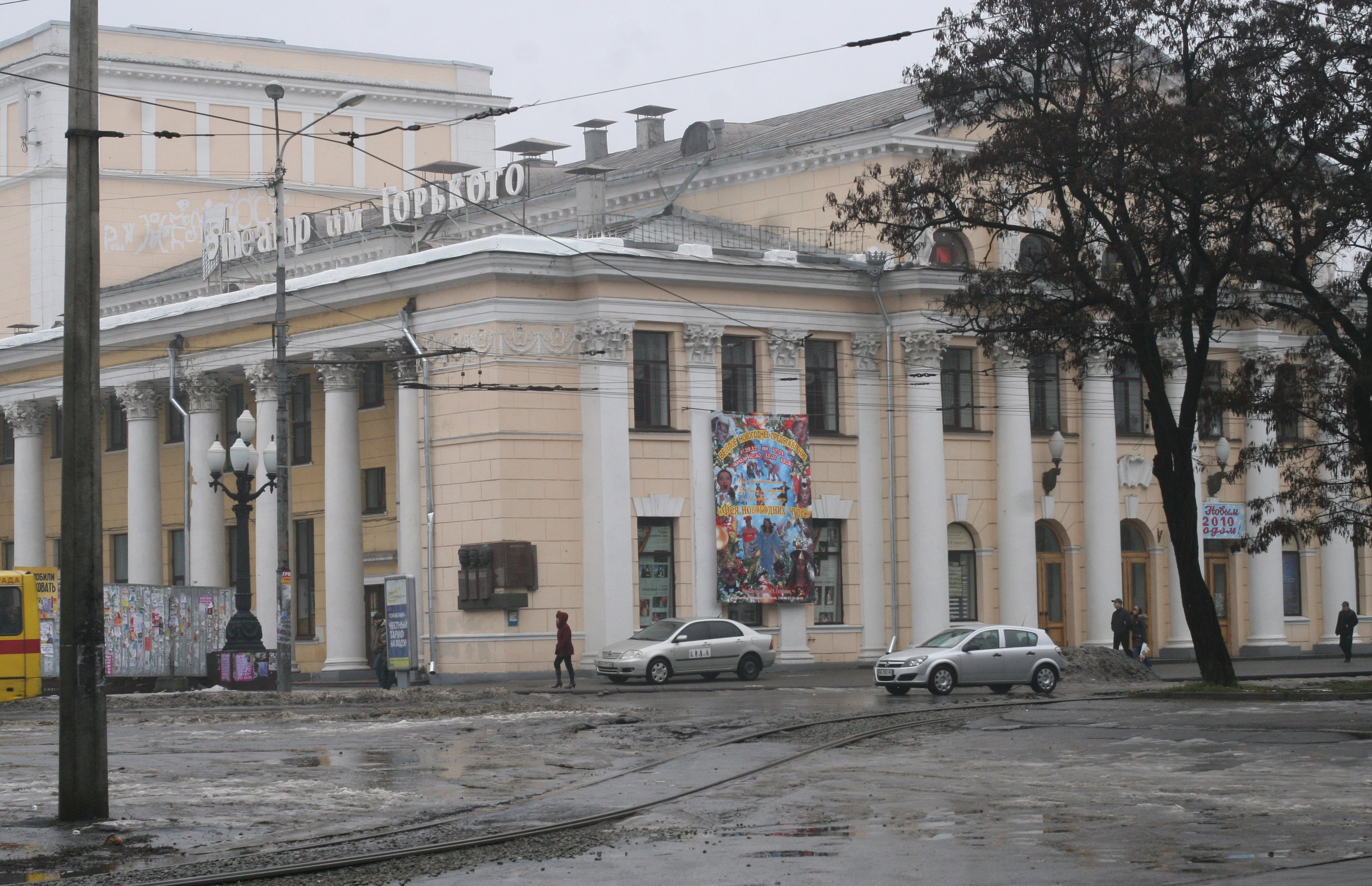
The theatre in 2009

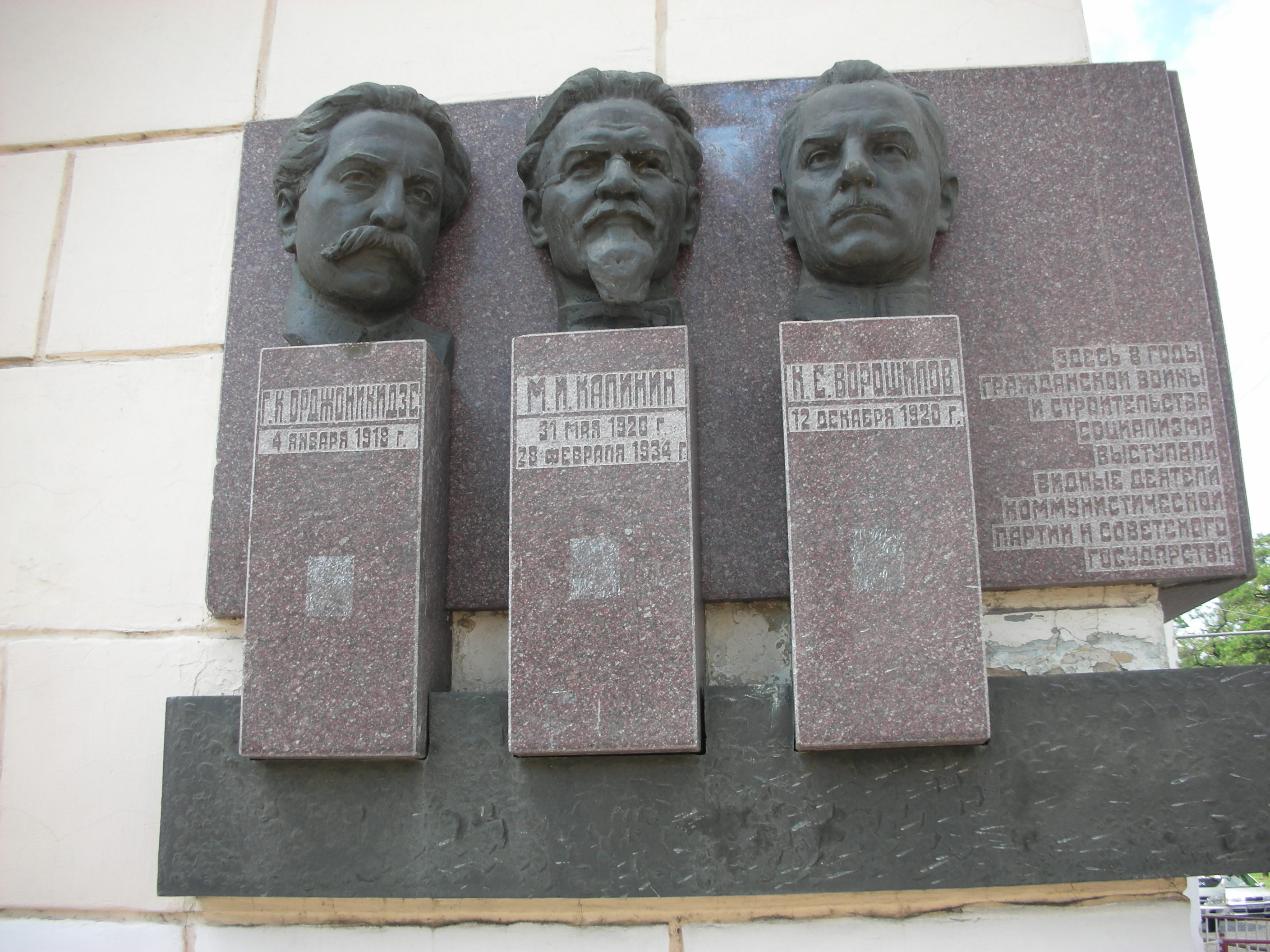
Commemorative busts at the theatre in 2013

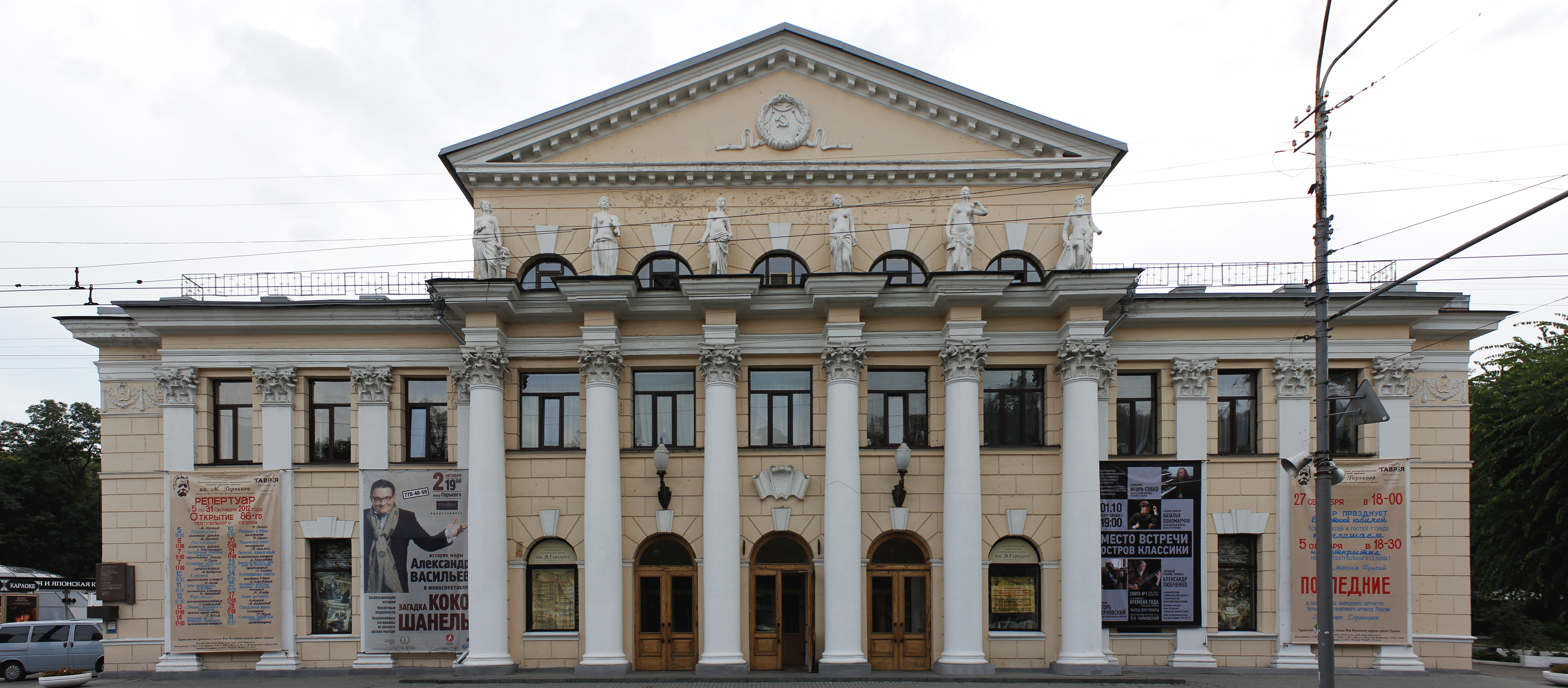
Main entrance to the theatre in 2012

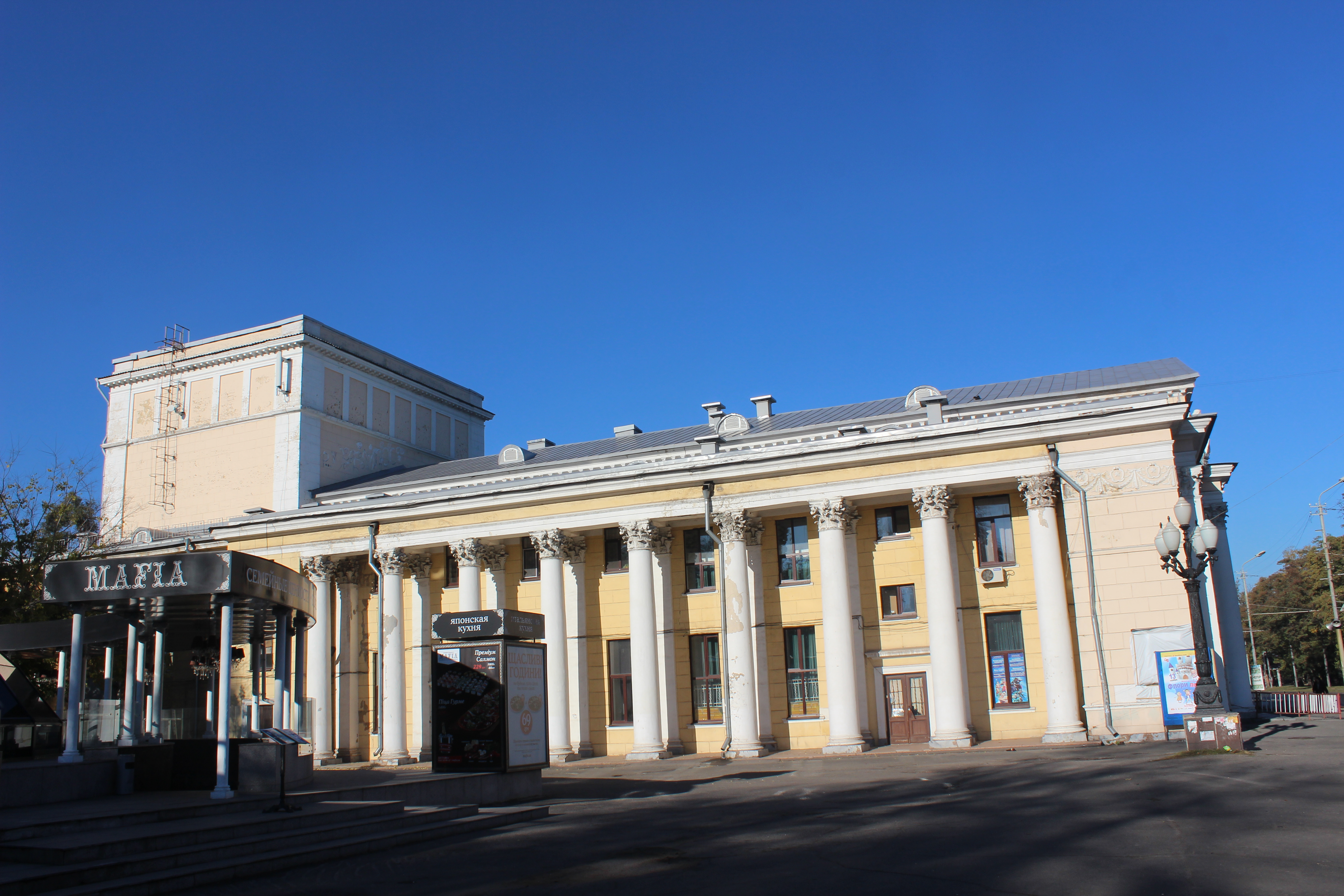
The theatre seen from the side in 2015
