= Dmytro Savchenko =

- Дмитро Савченко
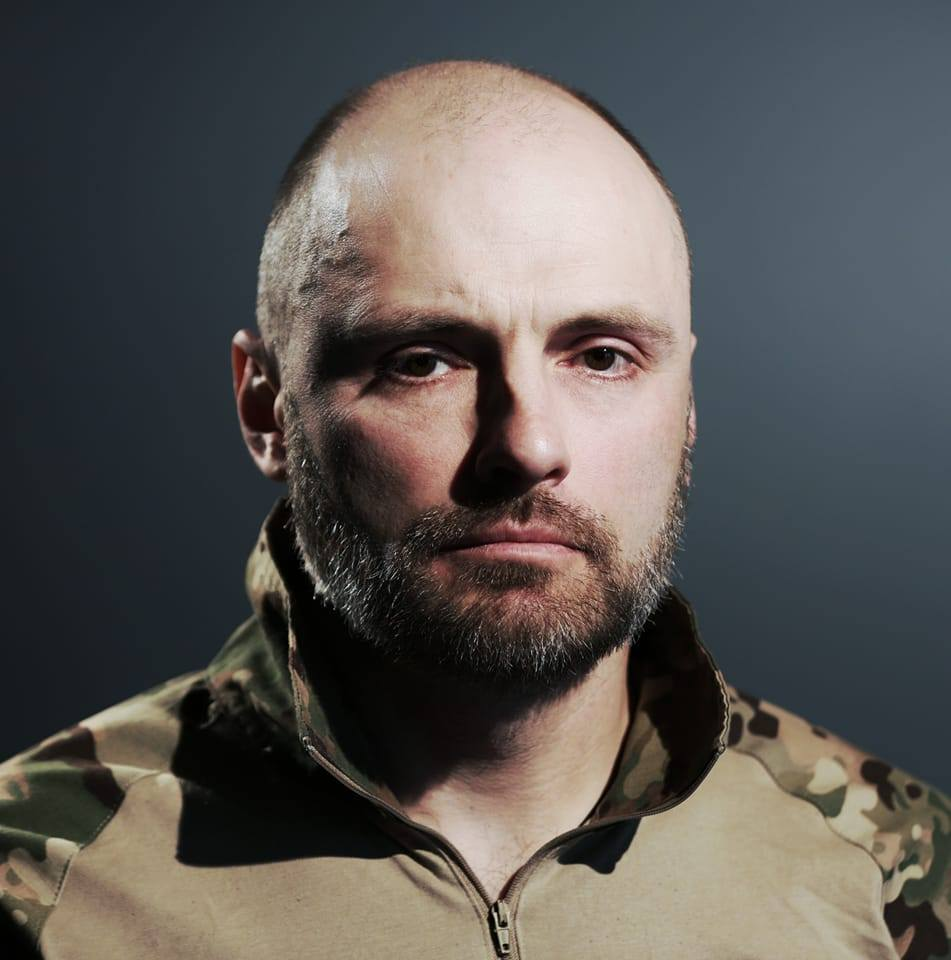
- Born: 1982 (age 43–44); Kyiv, Ukrainian SSR, Soviet Union
- Occupations: Writer, publisher, military serviceman
- Known for: Founder of Zaliznyi Tato publishing house, service in the Da Vinci Wolves Battalion
- Criminal charge: Terrorism (2004)
- Criminal penalty: 14 years' imprisonment

Dmytro Savchenko is a Ukrainian writer, and military serviceman. He founded the publishing house Zaliznyi Tato and serves in the Da Vinci Wolves unit. In his youth, he spent over a decade in prison following a conviction related to the 2004 Troieschyna Market bombings in Kyiv.

== Early life and 2004 imprisonment ==
In 2004, Savchenko was working as a sound engineer assistant for the Ukrainian television channel 5 Kanal. On 27 August 2004, he was arrested by Ukrainian police as a suspect in the 20 August bombings at the Troieschyna market in Kyiv, which killed one person and injured fourteen. The arrests occurred during the highly contested 2004 Ukrainian presidential election.

Despite his lawyer's arguments that the trial was marred by procedural violations and judicial bias, on 16 August 2005, the Kyiv Appellate Court convicted Savchenko and three other young men of terrorism. He was sentenced to 14 years in prison.

== Military service and personal life ==
In early 2022, Savchenko joined the 1st Separate Assault Company of the Ukrainian Volunteer Corps "Right Sector" under Dmytro Kotsiubailo. In September 2022, his unit participated in the liberation of Balakliia during the Kharkiv counteroffensive.
