= Lazar Hloba Park =

Park in Dnipro, Ukraine

- Парк Лазаря Глоби
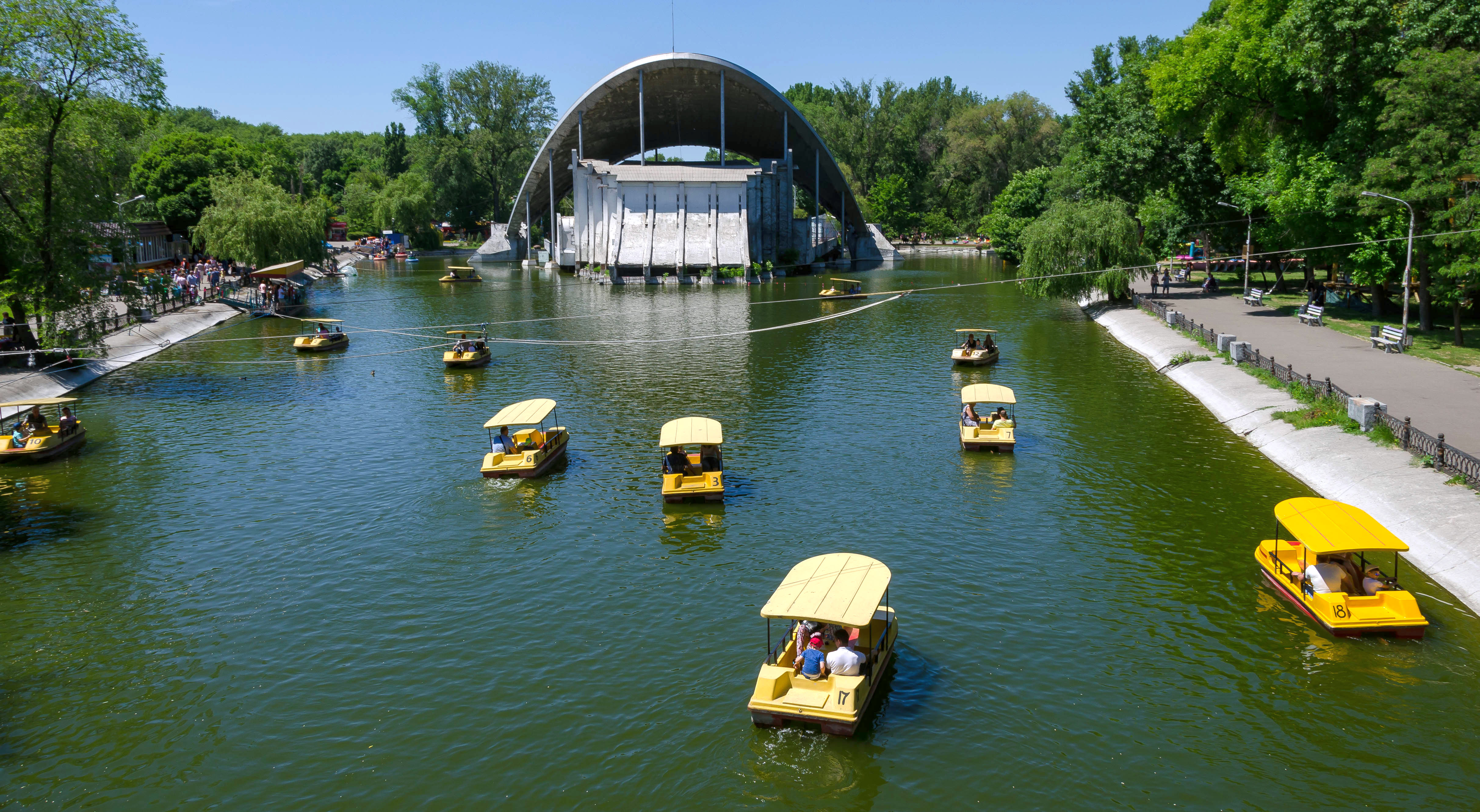
- City pond at the park
- Interactive map of Lazar Hloba Park
- Type: Urban park
- Location: Dnipro Raion
- Nearest city: Dnipro
- Coordinates: 48°28′15″N 35°01′41″E
- Area: 26 hectares (64 acres)
- Established: 1807
- Etymology: Lazar Hloba
- Operator: Dnipro City Council
- Status: culture and recreational park

The Lazar Hloba Park (Ukrainian: Парк Лазаря Глоби, romanized: Park Lazaria Hloby) is one of the oldest and largest central parks in the city of Dnipro, Ukraine. Established in 1807, the park bears the name Lazar Hloba in honor of the Cossack.

== History ==
Cossack Lazar Hloba established the park, which was then a garden. He chose to settle here after his military service ended in 1743 because he had a fascination with the scenic areas along the Dnieper. Gardening was his passion, thus after relocating, he planted several gardens and constructed four watermills alongside the river.

The upper garden on the riverbank was the first location Hloba relocated. He was quite pleased of the several beautiful trees and flowers he planted in Dnipro, which is now Taras Shevchenko Park. However, Grigory Potemkin quickly purchased this property for the purpose of building his home (Potemkin Palace) but was never completed, and creating a new park and garden area around it. As a result, Hloba moves to live on the land that was formerly his lower allotment, becoming the present day location.

Hloba extended the lowland garden to the future Sadovaya Street (now St. Andriy Fabra), from the lake that once stood where the Ozerka market now stands. He only spent around ten years here before dying at the age of 104, in 1793. Following his death, the garden was given to a canvas manufacturer on its western edge, renamed as the Katerynoslav State Botanical Garden.

In 1806, Novorossiysk needed unique trees and plants for fruit plantations, so Emperor Alexander I ordered Governor Duke of Richelieu to supply the top garden in Katerynoslav (Note: Dnipro has been renamed multiple time; it has its current name since 2016 when it was renamed (from Dnipropetrovsk) to comply with decommunization laws. It was named Dnipropetrovsk from 1926. The city was originally known as Katerynoslav.) for public celebrations and the lower garden to be returned for regular landscaping. The park, at the time covered more than 40 hectares (99 acres), has been given new life since 1807 thanks to the efforts of chief gardener Adam Hummel, who also helped to establish a Special Pomological Committee for gardening. This leads to the founding of the gardening school in the northern part of the garden in 1817.

Under the permanent leadership of General Ivan Inzov, the committee operated until 1843. The garden's species collection grows throughout this time, reaching 945 plant genera in 1837, and 20,000 seedlings are sold annually. The park and the Poltava School of Horticulture were included under the newly established Ministry of State Property in 1837. Though the school that served as its foundation lasted until 1858, the Katerynoslav Botanical Garden is progressively deteriorating since the death of its founder in 1848.

AIn 1869, the Treasury Garden was renamed the City Garden. For this reason, the western portion was divided and made inaccessible to the public in 1895, becoming the Technical Garden, while the remaining portion remained urban and open to all visitors. The technical section was leased, research spaces and greenhouses remained, and a gardening school reopened. A tiny lake inside the park's boundaries grew during the 1800s as a result of water from the nearby lake freezing over at the location of the present-day Lake Market.

On the reclaimed portions of the garden and the Lutheran Church, a Catholic Church was constructed in the 1860s and 1870s. The English Club was leased by the City Garden in the start of the 1800s, and a summer theater was constructed on the club's location in 1904. The garden, which was normally peaceful, became the scene of protests and demonstrations during the 1905 revolution. Thousands of laborers and soldiers gathered here on 19 October 1905. On the site of the park, which is now the Dnipro Academic Drama and Comedy Theater, Winter Theater was constructed in 1907.

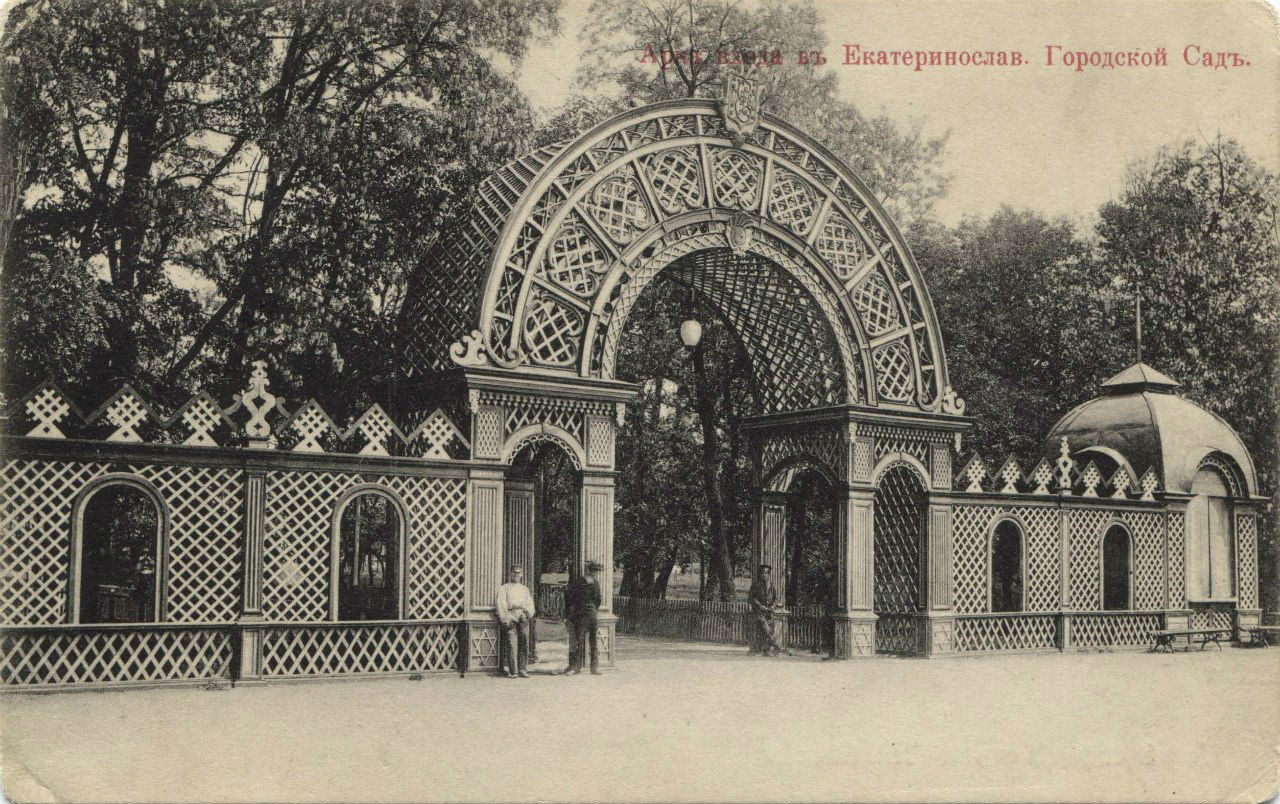
The park's entrance in the early 20th century

A new street named Nova was created during the park's subsequent rebuilding from 1924 to 1930, which extended from Starokozatska Street to present-day Dmytro Yavornytskyi Avenue. This resulted in a pedestrian bridge being built across the lake in the 1930s. Following the park's destruction during the Russian Civil War, the park's reconstruction got underway in the 1930s. Following the founding of Mendel Khatayevich's regional communist party in the city in 1934, the park was renamed the Khatayevich Central Park of Culture and Recreation in his honor. In commemoration of Valery Chkalov, the park was renamed following Khatayevich's capture and death in 1937. The park started to wear Chkalov name, even though the pilot had no personal connection with the park, nor the city.

Newspapers from December 1935 stated that the pioneers of the spawn-in school and the Komsomol inhabitants of the locomotive repair factory sought to construct a children's railway in the city together. Thus, work started on 2 April 1936, and the 2 kilometres (1.2 mi) railway was opened on 6 July. Nazi occupation authorities are believed to have carefully disassembled the railway equipment during World War II and planned to transport it to Germany. In 1947, the railway had a thorough restoration.

A fountain with a sculpture of Samson was perhaps the park's major draw, as images from the 1950s and 1960s inevitably showed. After the war, in the middle of the 20th century, it was installed. The Lazar Hlobe obelisk-memorial was taken down in 1936 to make room for the Children's Railway, and a replacement monument wasn't placed there until 1972. He paints a picture of him clutching a little piece of wood. It was not until 1992, the park was given its present-day name Lazar Hloba Park.

An explosion was heard on 27 April 2012, at 12:45 outside the park's main entrance on Dmytro Yavornytskyi Avenue (at the time this street was named Karl Marx Avenue). This was the third explosion in a string of terrorist strikes. Three persons were injured, one of whom required hospitalization.

The Dnipro City Council decided to name the pedestrian lane in Hloba Park in honor of John Paul II on 17 August 2022.

The statue of Chkalov in front of the park, erected in 1981, was dismantled in December 2022. The removed monument replaced the first one that first appeared in the park in 1957.

On 6 December 2025, amidst (ongoing since 2022) Russian missile attacks, fragments of a Russian rocket fell on a playground in the park. One facility in the park was (also) hit and damaged.

== Landmarks and structures ==
Playgrounds, a racing center, a children's train, and various areas for strolling and leisure are all present. In the middle of the park, an artificial lake has been built. A scene shaped like a seashell is decorated in one of the park's ends. There's a summer theater and several activities around the lake. Swans and ducks may be seen on the lake, and during the warm season, catamarans can be ridden on it. Other places of interest within the park includes:

- Monument of Lazar Hloba – a symbol of the park and a tribute to its founder.
- Dnipro Dolphinarium – the park's dolphinarium since 2009.
- Children's Railway – a children's narrow-gauge railway built in 1936.

== Gallery ==
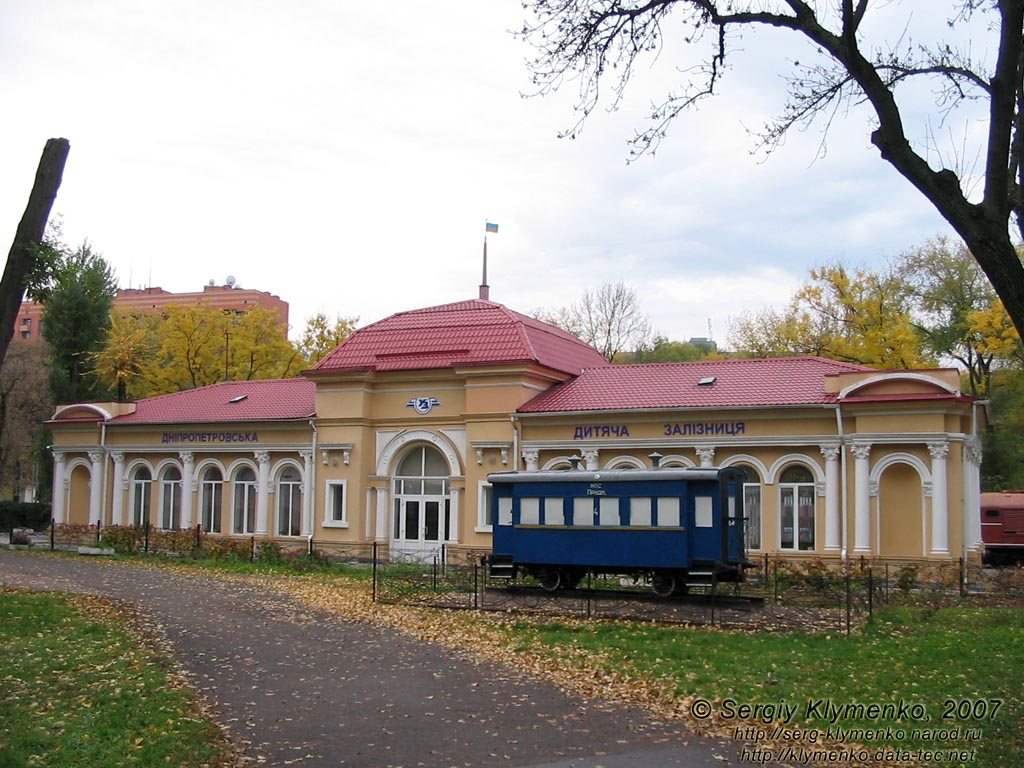
Children's Railway in 2006

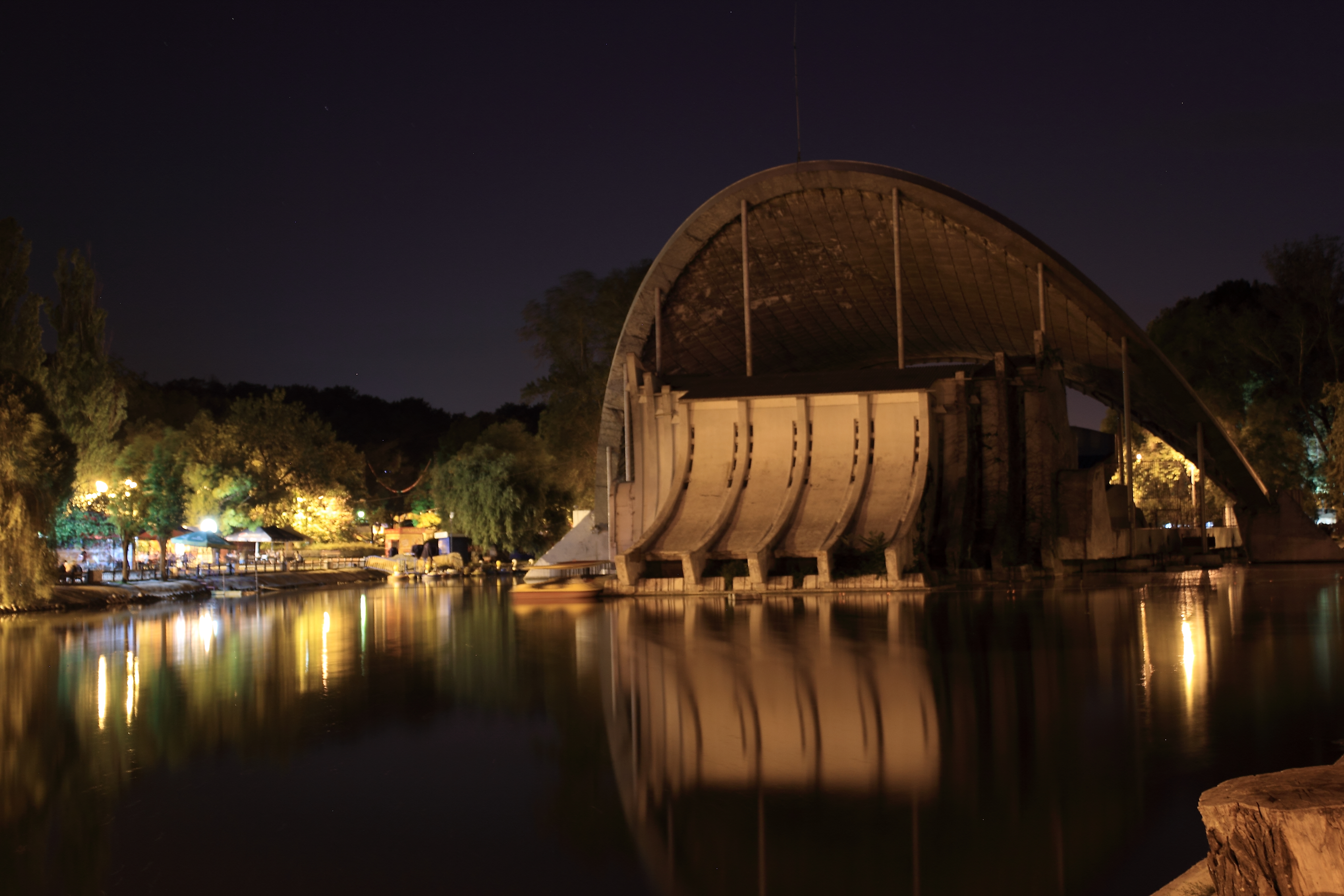
Summer Theatre at night in 2012

The park's lake in autumn, 2017

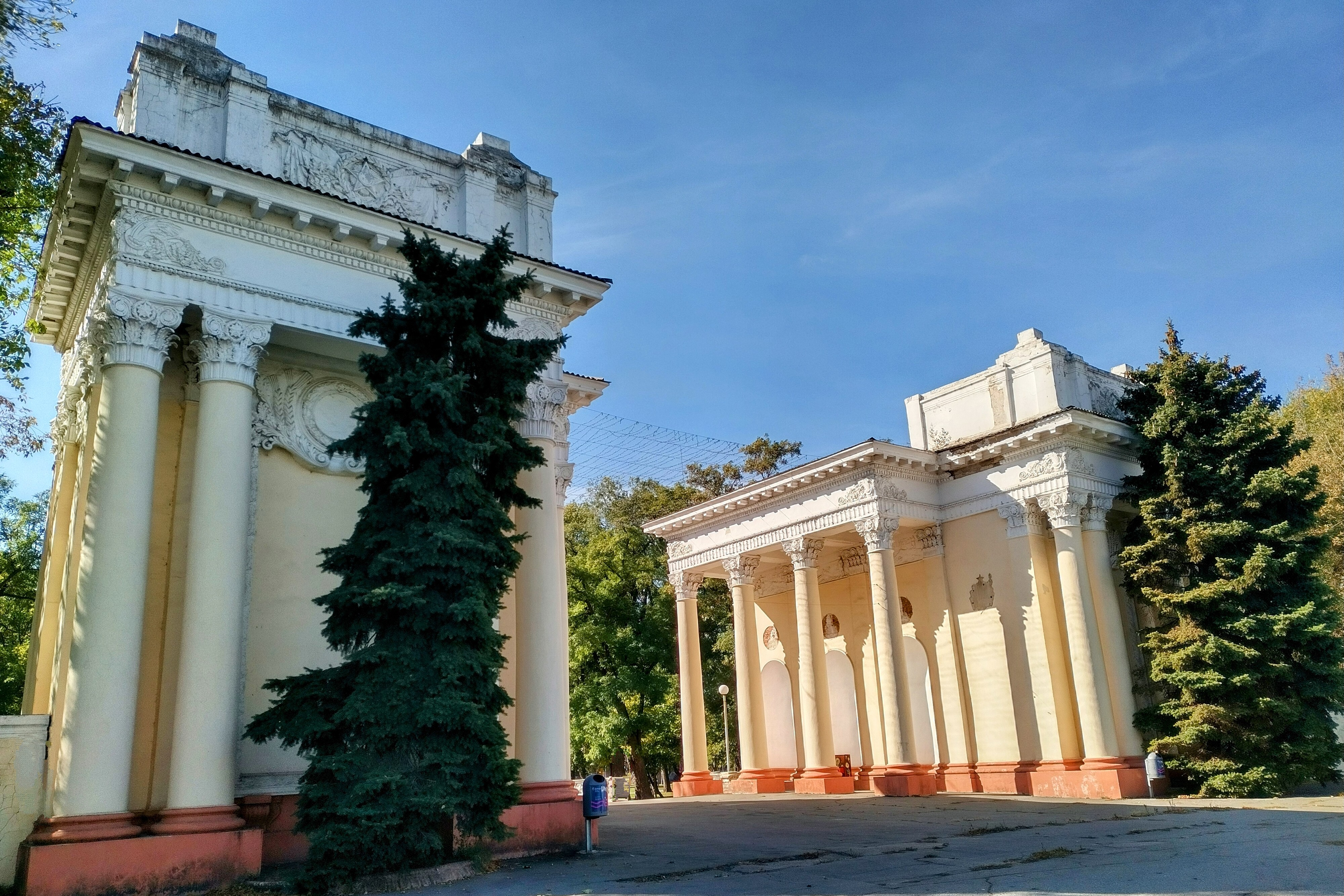
The park's main entrance in 2023
