= 2023 Kyiv court explosion =

Grenade attack in Ukraine

- Part of the aftermath of the 2015 Kyiv protests
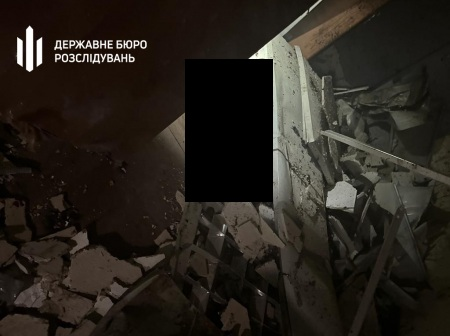
- Location: Shevchenkivskyi District Court, Shevchenkivskyi District, Kyiv, Ukraine
- Date: 5 July 2023; 18:20 - 19:11 (UTC+3)
- Attack type: Grenade attack
- Weapon: Grenade or IED
- Deaths: 1 (perpetrator)
- Injuries: 2
- Perpetrator: Ihor Humenyuk
- Motive: Prison escape

At 18:20 local time on 5 July 2023, an explosion took place in the Shevchenkivskyi District Court in the center of Kyiv, Ukraine, the city military administration said.

== Explosion ==
At 18:20, the sounds of an explosion were heard in the building of the Shevchenkivskyi District Court of Kyiv, Maryana Reva, a representative of the Ministry of Internal Affairs, told RBC Ukraine.

Interior Minister Ihor Klymenko confirmed that there had been an "emergency incident" in the courthouse and the police had received a report of an explosion. According to preliminary information, it was arranged by a man who was taken to the meeting. The Kyiv military administration reports that the explosion occurred in the toilet of the court.

According to a Ukrainska Pravda source, an unidentified object, probably a grenade, exploded in the court. An investigative-operational group, special forces, explosives technicians and dog handlers are working on the spot. The area around the building was cordoned off.

After the explosion in the Shevchenkivskyi District Court of Kyiv, traffic was blocked near the building.

At 19:11, a second explosion sounded in the court, the policeman on the spot immediately requested an ambulance.

Later, it became known that the suspect blew himself up with a grenade and his two guards were injured.

== Perpetrator ==
Strana.ua claims that the explosion was caused by a former Sich Battalion fighter Ihor Humenyuk, who is accused of detonating a grenade during a rally in front of the Verkhovna Rada of Ukraine in 2015. The action was organized by the ultranationalist Svoboda party against the implementation of the special status of Donbas in the Constitution. Then, according to investigators, Humenyuk threw a grenade at the National Guard officers. As a result of the attack, three National Guardsmen were killed. About 140 more people were injured.

On 5 July, the court was to extend the measure of restraint for Humenyuk, and he was kept in a pre-trial detention center, it was reported in court.
