= 2012 Dnipropetrovsk explosions =

2012 explosions in Ukraine

- Location: Four tram stations in Dnipropetrovsk, Ukraine
- Date: 27 April 2012 between 11:50 and 13:00 (EET)
- Target: Public transport system and users
- Attack type: IED
- Deaths: 0
- Injuries: 26–29

The 2012 Dnipropetrovsk explosions were a series of co-ordinated explosions in Dnipropetrovsk (now Dnipro), Ukraine on 27 April 2012. The bombs went off between 11:50 and 13:00 near four tram stations. The attackers' motivations are not publicly known.

== Background ==
Ukraine has not been afflicted with political terrorism, but there had been previous explosions connected to criminal extortion; in a previous attack in January 2011, two pre-dawn explosions outside an office of a coal mining company and then a shopping center in the Ukrainian city of Makiivka caused no casualties. Authorities then received letters demanding money in exchange for an end to the blasts. The perpetrators were arrested and sentenced to lengthy prison terms.

The Dnipropetrovsk attacks came 40 days ahead of the UEFA Euro 2012 games, hosted in Poland and Ukraine. This raised security concerns over the safety of the games, though no match was actually scheduled to be held in Dnipropetrovsk. UEFA anyway dismissed any hypothesis of moving the championship anywhere else because of security reasons. Hryhoriy Surkis, head of the Football Federation of Ukraine declared he believed the blasts aimed "to torpedo the tournament in Ukraine at all costs and compromise our country in the eyes of the international community." Polish Prime Minister Donald Tusk remarked: "This issue [tournament security] needs to be treated with the utmost seriousness".

== Chronology of the attacks ==
Map of Dnipro Tram system, with line No.1 along which the bombings took place marked in red

On 27 April, beginning at around 11:50, four home-made bombs went off in different locations within Dnipropetrovsk. The first bomb went at 11:50 a.m. local time and the last bomb went off at 1:00 pm. The bombs were all placed in trashcans near four tram stations, belonging to the same line:

- The first bomb exploded at 11:50 am. It was placed in a trash can in a tram stop near the Dnipro Opera and Ballet Theatre, and exploded as the tram was slowing to pick up passengers. The bomb injured 13 people and shattered the windows of the tram and a nearby car.
- The second bomb exploded 30 minutes later. The bomb was placed in a trashcan near the Rodina cinema and injured 11 people, nine of them children.
- The third bomb exploded shortly after the second one. It was placed near the entrance to Lazar Hloba Park. Three people were injured, and there were no reported fatalities.
- The fourth bomb went off at the same tram station as the first one. No one was injured.

Minutes after the explosion, panic began spreading in Dnipropetrovsk. People remained in their offices following a rumor that there were more blasts coming. Students remained at school. Several buildings were placed into "lockdown mode".

Internet connections in the area went down for hours after the explosions. Telephone networks jammed up quickly, and as of 28 April, telephone companies were still struggling to restore functionality to their networks. Furthermore, Ukrainian authorities jammed the signal in certain parts of the city, in response to the theory that the bombs may have been triggered by cellphones.

== Victims ==
Ukraine's Emergencies Ministry initially reported that 27 people were injured, but authorities revised the figure to 26 the day after the explosions. Among those injured were 9 teenagers. 27 people remained in the hospital as of 28 April, including three who were in serious condition.

According to security experts interviewed by Interfax, the nature of the injuries received by the victims suggests that the devices did not contain damaging elements, and the resulting injuries were probably caused by the debris of trash bins and other items.

== Investigations ==
The authorities reported that several suspects were placed under arrest.

On 27 April the Ukrainian President Viktor Yanukovych assembled a committee to carry out an investigation of the explosions, with members including Viktor Pshonka, the Prosecutor General of Ukraine; Chairman of the Security Service of Ukraine, Igor Kalinin; Interior Minister Vitaliy Zakharchenko; Deputy Prime Minister and Minister of Health, Raisa Bohatyryova; and Serhiy Lyovochkin, Head of the Presidential Administration.

The Dnipropetrovsk regional prosecutor opened a criminal case on counts of terrorism. The criminal case on the grounds of an offense under Part 2 of Art. 258 of the Criminal Code (terrorist act), was transferred to the organization of pre-trial investigation in the investigative unit of the central apparatus of the Security Service of Ukraine (SBU). In April 2012 SBU investigators sought three men on suspicion of committing a crime, whose sketch were created and published. It is known that they were all men. One of them was about 30 years, another about 40, the third from 35 to 45 years. In May 2012 police officers arrested four residents of Dnipropetrovsk. According to Prosecutor General of Ukraine Viktor Pshonka this arrest closed the criminal case and it had solved the crime. All 4 men were also accused of organizing three terrorist attacks in Dnipropetrovsk, Kharkiv and Zaporizhia in October–November 2011. Lev Prosvirnin and Dmytro Reva were charged with a terrorist attack committed on preliminary collusion by a group of persons. Prosvirnin and Reva pleaded not guilty. According to the SBU the men "did not agree with the social and political regime in Ukraine. They wanted to cause chaos and provoke protests of the public against authorities. They also insist that their goal was to frustrate the hosting of Euro 2012 in Ukraine". The prosecutor's office in Dnipropetrovsk opened in March 2013 criminal proceedings because Reva had complained against falsified testimonies against him. Late February 2013 the European Court of Human Rights received a complaint from lawyers for Reva against long-term groundless detention. Prosvirnin and Reva were released on 11 March 2014 after the court removed their charges.

== Reactions ==
=== In Ukraine ===
==== Government officials ====
Ukrainian President Viktor Yanukovich declared "We... understand that this is another challenge to us, to the whole country. We will think how to respond accordingly. Speaking in Dnipropetrovsk on 28 April, Yanukovich offered 200.000 euro to citizens able to provide the authorities with useful information on the authors of the attack.

Ukrainian Prime Minister Mykola Azarov declared that the explosions "are profitable to those forces that are interested in destabilizing the situation in the country.".

Mykola Tomenko, deputy parliament speaker and member of the opposition, suggested the blasts were orchestrated by the government in order to quiet Western criticism of Yulia Tymoshenko's imprisonment: "I don't rule out that the authorities and law enforcement bodies may be among the organizers of a scenario, which involves deflecting the attention of the world and Ukraine form Tymoshenko's case on the whole and her beating in particular." Volodymyr Yavorivsky, head of the Culture Committee of the Ukrainian Parliament and member of the opposition, accused the government parties to have staged the attack in order to jeopardize the October 2012 Ukrainian parliamentary election and install an authoritarian regime.

==== Experts and analysts ====
According to Vadim Karasev, director of the Ukrainian Institute of Global Strategies, the blasts might have been prepared by the secret services in order to spread panic, fear, and confusion in Dnipropetrovsk and in Ukraine. This strategy of tension might be instrumental in limiting political activism and oppositional mobilization in Ukraine under the pretext of terrorism.

Kirill Frolov, director of the Ukraine desk of the Institute for the studies of the CIS countries, supported the hypothesis of political motivation for the attack, but also condemned the cynicism of the opposition accusing the government of the attack. According to Frolov, the Yanukovich regime did not need such an event, as his political manifesto for the upcoming elections would be based on the good conduct of UEFA Euro 2012.

=== Abroad ===
Matthew Rojansky, on CNN, suggested several possible motivations for the attack, ranging from random acts of violence, or the work of gangs from Ukraine's criminal underworld and endlessly feuding oligarchs, to international terrorism linked to al-Qa'eda, up to the eventual involvement of Russian secret services.

== See also ==
- 2011 Minsk Metro bombing
- 2010 Moscow Metro bombings
