= Dnipro =

City and administrative center of Dnipropetrovsk Oblast, Ukraine

Dnipro Дніпро
- City

Ukrainian transcription(s)
  - Romanization: Dnipro
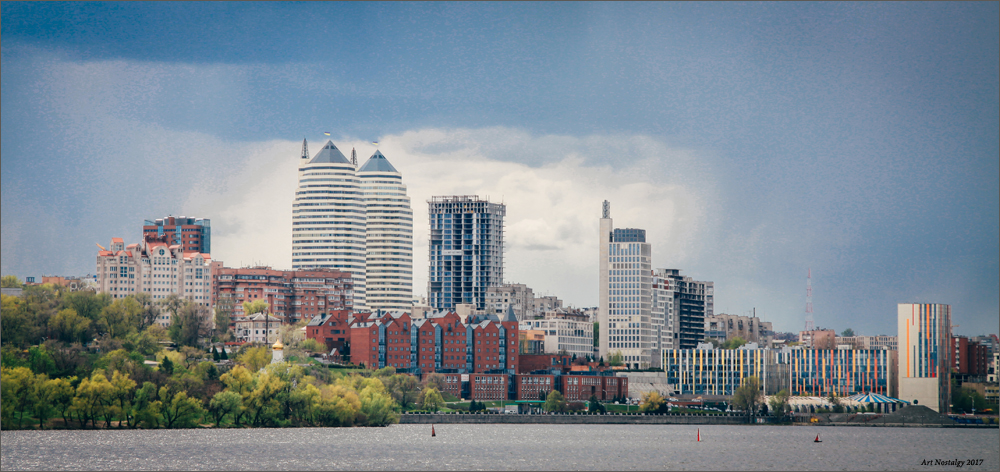
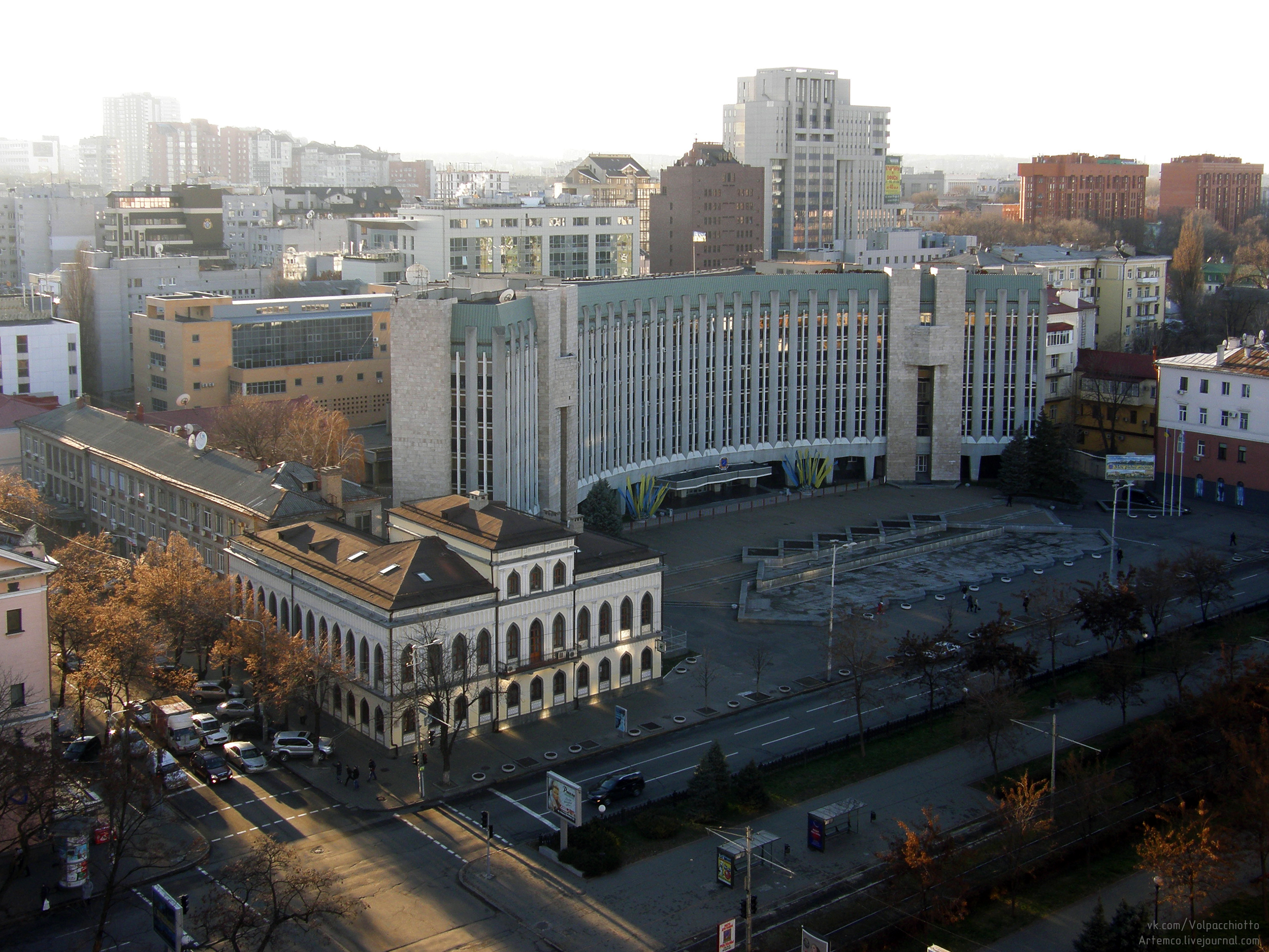
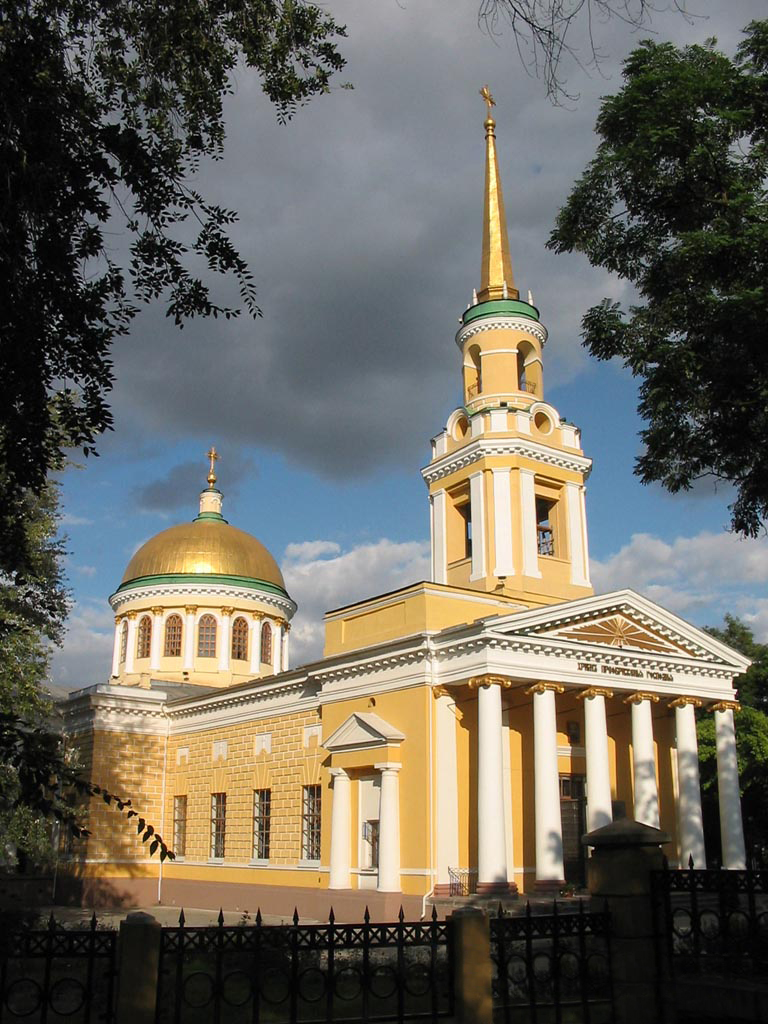
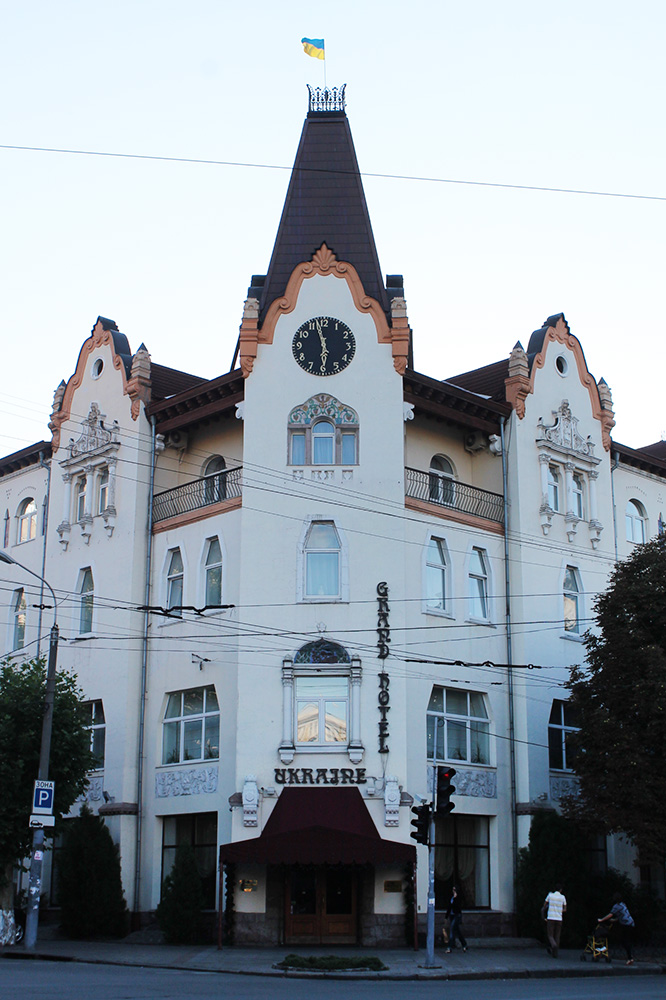
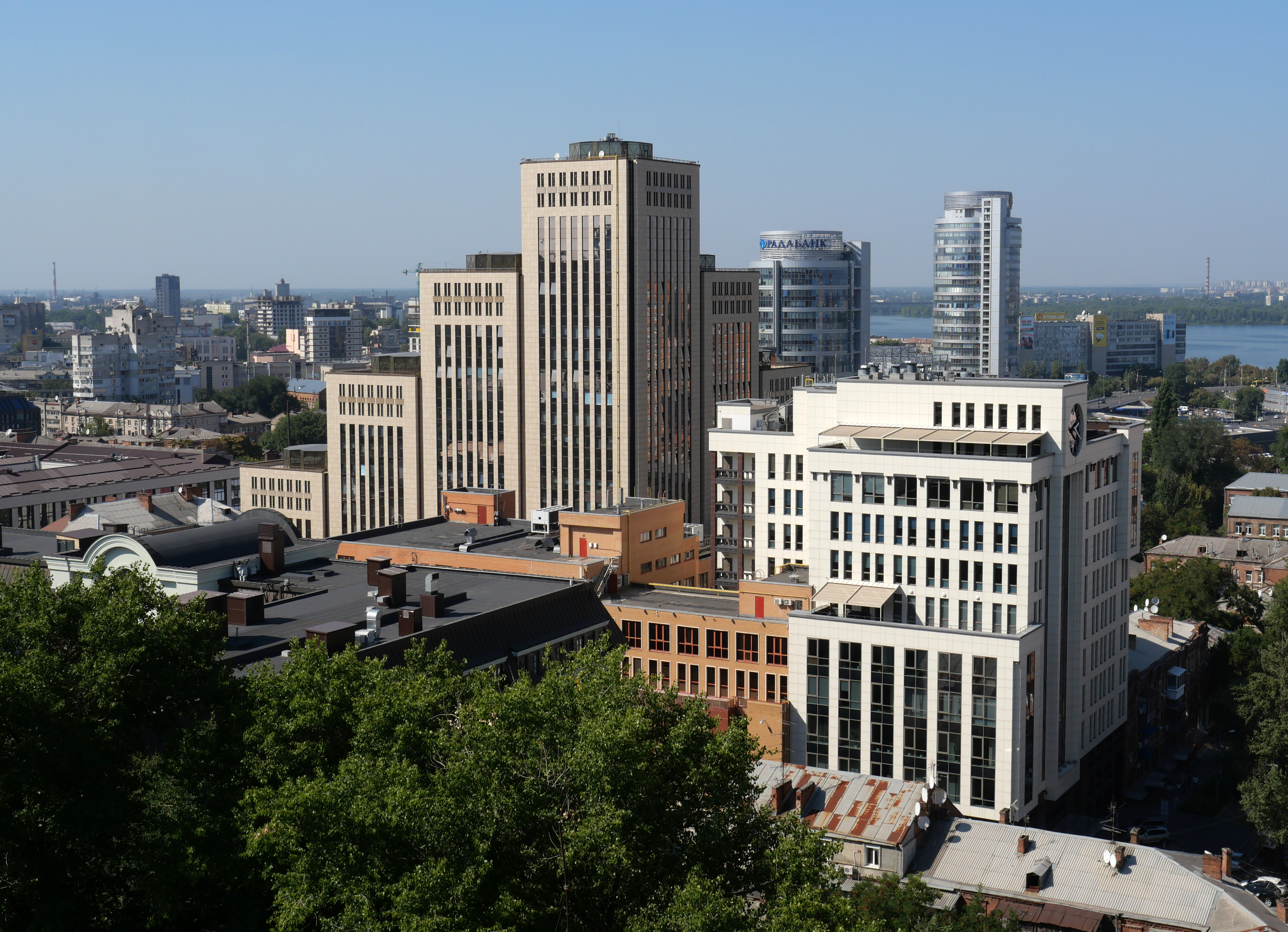
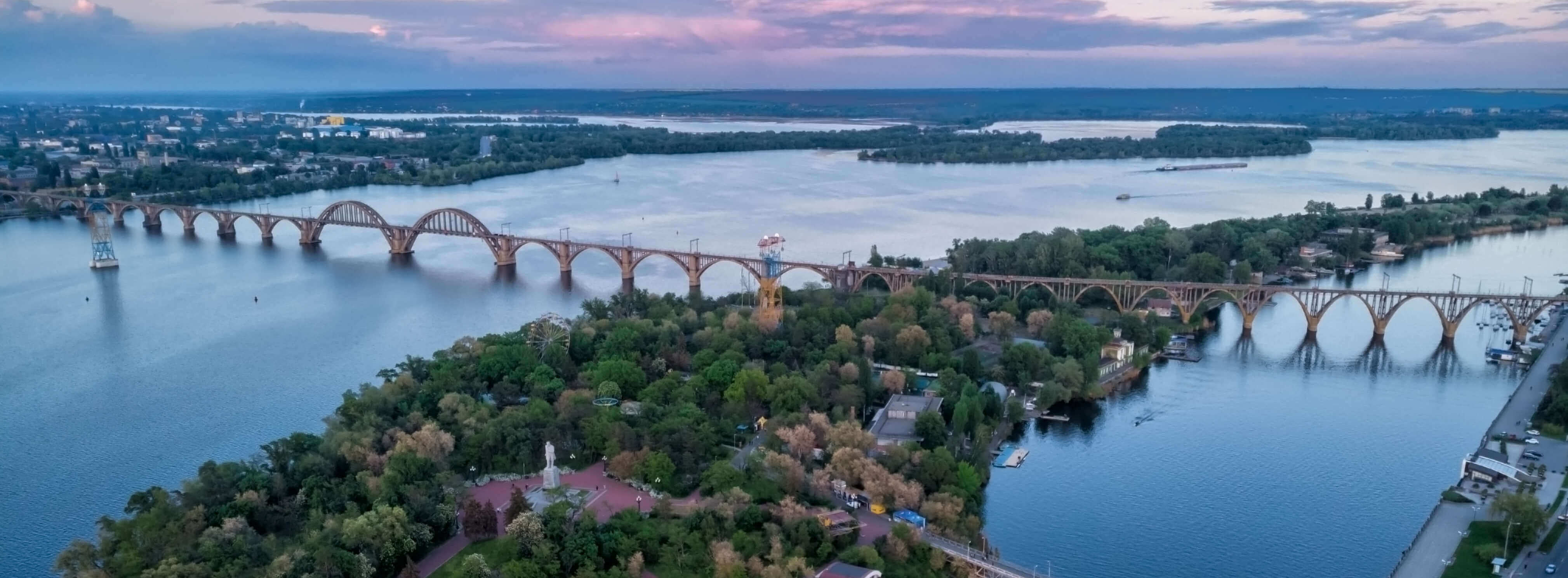
- From top, left to right: Сentral Dnipro skyline; City Council; Transfiguration Cathedral; Ukraine Hotel; Menorah Center; Merefa-Kherson bridge, Monastyrskyi Island and Dnieper River

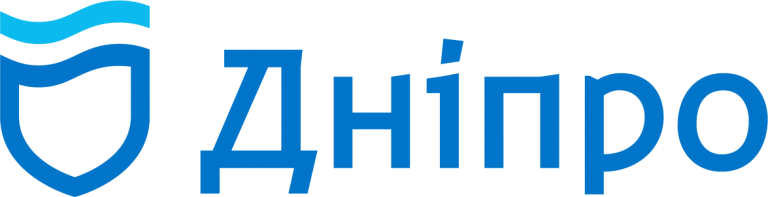
- Flag Coat of arms Wordmark

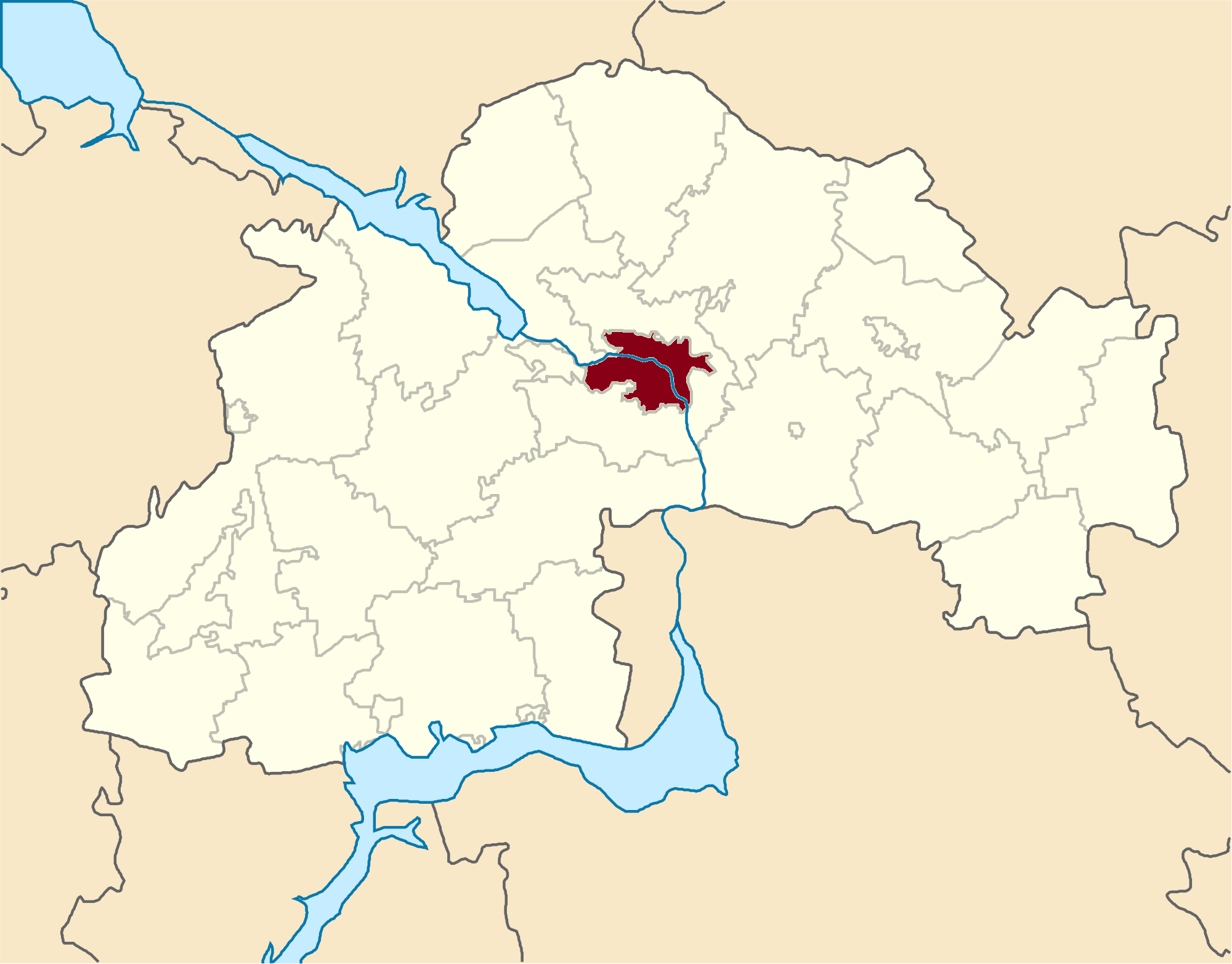
- Dnipro's location within Dnipropetrovsk Oblast
- Interactive map of Dnipro
- Location of Dnipro in Dnipropetrovsk Oblast Location of Dnipro in Ukraine Location of Dnipro in Europe
- Coordinates: 48°28′03″N 35°02′24″E
- Country: Ukraine
- Oblast: Dnipropetrovsk Oblast
- Raion: Dnipro Raion
- Hromada: Dnipro urban hromada
- Founded: 1526 (500 years ago) (officially, as Stara Samar)
- City Status: 1526 (as Stara Samar); 1778 (as Yekaterinoslav)
- Administrative HQ: Dnipro City Hall, 75 Akademik Yavornitskyi Prospekt
- Districts: List of 8: Amur-Nyzhnodniprovskyi; Chechelivskyi; Industrialnyi; Novokodatskyi; Samarskyi; Shevchenkivskyi; Sobornyi; Tsentralnyi

Government
  - Type: Dnipro City Council
  - Mayor: Borys Filatov (Proposition)

Area
  - City: 409.718 km^{2} (158.193 sq mi)
  - Metro: 5,606 km^{2} (2,164 sq mi)
- Elevation: 155 m (509 ft)

Population (2022)
  - City: 968,502
  - Rank: 4th in Ukraine
  - Density: 2,411/km^{2} (6,240/sq mi)
  - Metro: ▼1,145,065
- Demonym(s): Dniprianyn, Dniprianka, Dnipriany
- Time zone: UTC+2 (EET)
  - Summer (DST): UTC+3 (EEST)
- Postal code: 49000—49489
- Area code: +380 56(2)
- Website: dniprorada.gov.ua

Dnipro (Note: See §Name for former and native names) is Ukraine's fourth-largest city, with about one million inhabitants. It is located in the eastern part of Ukraine, 391 km (243 mi) southeast of the Ukrainian capital Kyiv on the Dnipro River, from which it takes its name. Dnipro is the administrative centre of Dnipropetrovsk Oblast. It hosts the administration of Dnipro urban hromada. Dnipro has a population of 968,502 (2022 estimate).

Archeological evidence suggests the site of the present city was settled by Cossack communities from at least 1524. Yekaterinoslav ("glory of Catherine") was established by decree of the Russian Empress Catherine the Great in 1787 as the administrative center of Novorossiya. From the end of the 19th century, the town attracted foreign capital and an international, multi-ethnic workforce exploiting Kryvbas iron ore and Donbas coal. Up until the German occupation in World War II, more than a third of the city population was Jewish.

Renamed Dnipropetrovsk in 1926 after the Ukrainian Communist Party leader Grigory Petrovsky, it became a focus for the Stalinist commitment to the rapid development in the Soviet Union of heavy industry. After World War II, this included nuclear, arms, and space industries whose strategic importance led to Dnipropetrovsk's designation as a closed city.

In December 1991, the city's voters overwhelmingly approved Ukraine's declaration of independence. Following the Euromaidan events of 2014, they shifted their allegiance from pro-Russian parties to those favouring closer ties with the European Union. As a result of the ensuing "decommunization", the city was renamed Dnipro in 2016. Following the Russian invasion of Ukraine in February 2022, Dnipro rapidly developed as a logistical hub for humanitarian aid and a reception point for people fleeing the various battle fronts.

== Name ==
=== Current names ===
- Ukrainian: Дніпро [d⁽ʲ⁾n⁽ʲ⁾iˈprɔ]
- Russian: Днепр, romanized: Dnepr [dnʲepr]

=== Former names ===
- Novyi Kodak 1645–1784
- Yekaterinoslav (also spelled Ekaterinoslav; Russian: Екатеринослав [jɪkətʲɪrʲɪnɐˈslaf]; Ukrainian: Катеринослав, romanized: Katerynoslav [kɐterɪnoˈslɑu̯]) 1784–1796
- Novorossiysk (Russian: Новороссийск [nəvərɐˈsʲijsk]; Ukrainian: Новоросійськ, romanized: Novorosiisk [noworoˈs⁽ʲ⁾ijsʲk]) 1796–1802, briefly renamed during the reign of Catherine II's son, tsar Paul I; however, the previous name was restored by tsar Alexander I after his father's assassination
- Yekaterinoslav 1802–1918, called Catharinoslav on some nineteenth-century maps.
- Sicheslav (Ukrainian: Січеслав [s⁽ʲ⁾itʃeˈslɑu̯]) 1918–1921 (unofficial name)
- Yekaterinoslav/Katerynoslav 1918–1926
- Dnipropetrovsk (Ukrainian: Дніпропетровськ [ˌdn⁽ʲ⁾ipropeˈtrɔu̯sʲk]; Russian: Днепропетровск, romanized: Dnepropetrovsk [dʲnʲɪprəpʲɪˈtrofsk]), also Dnipropetrovske (Ukrainian: Дніпропетровське) according to the Kharkiv orthography 1926–2016. The word originates from Дніпро ("Dnieper River") + Петровський, after Soviet revolutionary Grigory Petrovsky.

=== Name history ===
The original name of a Ukrainian Cossack city on the territory of modern Dnipro was Novyi Kodak (Ukrainian: Новий Кодак [noˈwɪj koˈdɑk], New Kodak). Also on the territory of Modern Dnipro, the Russian Empire founded Yekaterinoslav (the glory of Catherine). This name was first mentioned in a report to Azov Governor Vasily Chertkov to Grigory Potemkin on 23 April 1776. He wrote "The provincial city called Yekaterinoslav should be the best convenience on the right side of the Dnieper River near Kaydak..." (Which referred to New Kodak). The construction was officially transferred to the right bank in a decree of Empress of Russia Catherine II of 23 January 1784.

In the 17th century the city was also known as Polovytsia.

In 1918, the Central Council of Ukraine of the Ukrainian People's Republic proposed to change the name of the city to Sicheslav; however, this was never finalised.

In 1926 the city was renamed after communist leader Grigory Petrovsky. In some Anglophone media Dnipro was nicknamed the Rocket City during the Cold War.

The 2015 law on decommunization required the city to be renamed. On 29 December 2015 the Dnipro City Council officially changed the reference of the city naming from referring to Petrovsky to being in honor of Saint Peter, thus making the name consistent with the law without actually changing the name itself.

On 3 February 2016 a draft law was registered in the Verkhovna Rada (the Ukrainian parliament) to change the name of the city to Dnipro. On 19 May 2016 the Ukrainian parliament passed a bill to officially rename the city (to Dnipro). The resolution was approved by 247 out of the 344 MPs, with 16 opposing the measure. (Note: The city's mayor Borys Filatov described the renaming of the city as "controversial and irrelevant". Oleksandr Vilkul (who stood against Filatov at the 2015 mayoral election) claimed that 90% of residents were opposed to the change in the city's name.) (Note: On 1 June 2016 the Ukrainian parliament refused to support a resolution to cancel the renaming. On 16 June 2016, 48 MPs appealed against the renaming in the Constitutional Court of Ukraine. The Constitutional Court refused to consider this case on 12 October 2016.)

Following the renaming of the city the reference to Petrovsky has been removed from institutions named after the city. A notable exception is the name of the surrounding province, which is listed in the territorial structure of Ukraine in the Constitution. Thus until a lengthy and complicated process of amending is carried out, it officially retains the name Dnipropetrovsk Oblast.

== History ==
=== Early history ===
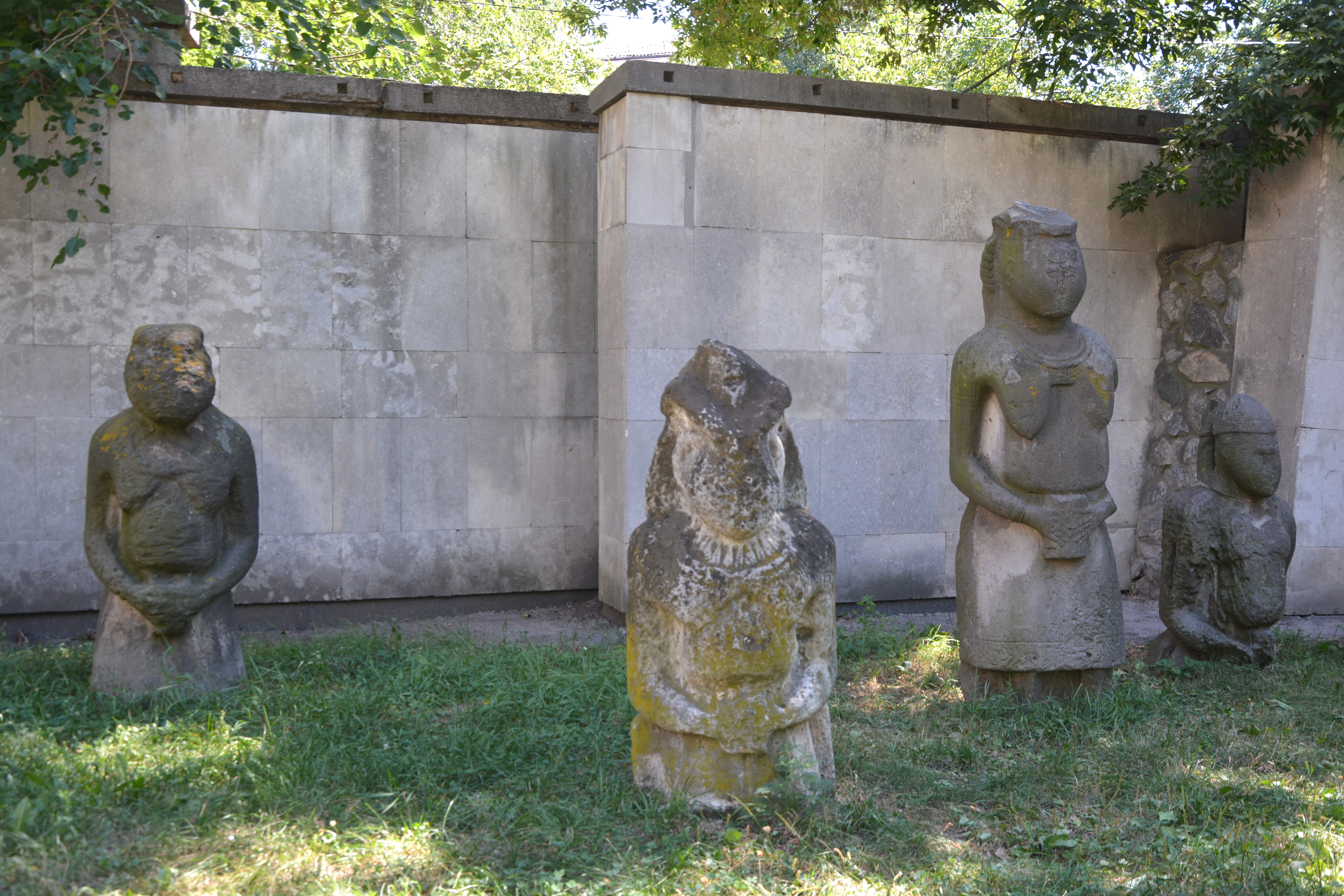
A part of the Cuman statue collection of the Dmytro Yavornytsky National Historical Museum of Dnipro

Human settlements in current Dnipropetrovsk Oblast date from the Paleolithic era. According to archeological finds, in the Paleolithic period (7—3 thousand BC) human settlements appear near the Aptekarska brook in what is now Chechelivskyi District and on Monastyrskyi Island. A Neolithic stonecrafter's house has been excavated in one of Dnipro's city parks. In the Bronze Age the area was settled by diverse tribes. Traces of Cimmerian settlements during the Bronze Age have been found near today's Taras Shevchenko Park. The area of modern Dnipro was part of the Scythian empire from approximately the 1st century BC until the 3rd century BC. During the Migration Period (300–800) nomadic tribes of the Huns, Avars, Bulgarians, and Magyars passed through the lands of the Dnieper region, they came into contact with local agricultural East Slavs.

The area of modern Dnipro was part of the Kievan Rus' (882–1240). The region witnessed fighting between the armies of Kievan Rus' and Khazars, Pechenegs, Tork people and Cumans. In the 13th century the Dnieper region was devastated during the Mongol Empire conquest of Kievan Rus'. The area of modern Dnipro city was incorporated into the Mongol's khanate Golden Horde.

In the 15th century the area became part of the Kiev Voivodeship (1471–1565) of the Polish–Lithuanian Commonwealth. Archeological finds in today's Dnipro's urban district Samarskyi District suggest that the important river crossing was a trading settlement from at least 1524. The Dnipro city council officially set 1526 as the date of the city's foundation in August 2026. (Previously 1776 was the official date of the foundation of Dnipro.) This year of foundation is based on the existence of the Stara Samar settlement on the territory of the modern Dnipro. (Note: Not all historians supported the new dating, as they considered the evidence insufficient to determine 1526 as the year of the city's foundation.) Starting in December 2025 the city council had been consulting with experts to set a new official year of the city's foundation; since they believe 1776 "is a myth of imperial Russia", and that the city existed many years before 1776.

In 1635, the Polish–Lithuanian Commonwealth built the Kodak Fortress above the Dnieper Rapids at Kodaky on the south-eastern outskirts of modern Dnipro near the current Kaidatsky Bridge, only to have it destroyed within months by the Cossacks of Ivan Sulyma. Rebuilt in 1645, it was captured by Zaporozhian Sich in 1648.

Around the fortress a settlement emerged that became a town in Kodak Palanka (province) of the Zaporizhian Sich called Novyi (New) Kodak. Cossacks often hid the true number of the population to reduce taxation and other obligations, but according to documentary evidence, it can be assumed that the population of New Kodak was at least 3,000 people. The fortress was garrisoned by Cossacks until the Sich, allied with the Ottoman Empire and their Tartar vassals, drove out the encroaching Tsardom of Russia. Under the terms of the Russian withdrawal—the Treaty of the Pruth in 1711—the Kodak fortress was demolished.

In the mid-1730s, the fortress and Russians returned, living in an uneasy cohabitation with local cossacks. From mid-century they co-existed with the Zaporozhian sloboda (or "free settlement") of Polovytsia located on the site of today's Central Terminal and the Ozyorka farmers market.

In the Russo-Turkish War (1768–1774), the Zaporozhian cossacks allied with Empress Catherine II. No sooner had they assisted the Russians to victory than they faced an imperial ultimatum to disband their confederation. The liquidation of the Sich destroyed their political autonomy and saw the incorporation of their lands into the new governates of Novorossiya. In 1784, Catherine ordered the foundation of new city, commonly referred to at the time as Katerynoslav.

In 2001 the seal of Kodak Palanka became the central element of Dnipro's coat of arms and Dnipro's official flag.

=== Imperial city ===
Historical affiliations

Russian Empire 1776–1917
Ukrainian People's Republic 1917–1918
∟ autonomous part of the Russian Republic
Ukrainian State 1918
Ukrainian People's Republic 1918–1920
Ukrainian Soviet Socialist Republic 1920–1941
∟ part of the Soviet Union from 1922
Reichskommissariat Ukraine 1941–1944
∟ part of German-occupied Europe
Ukrainian Soviet Socialist Republic 1944–1991
∟ part of the Soviet Union
Ukraine 1991–present

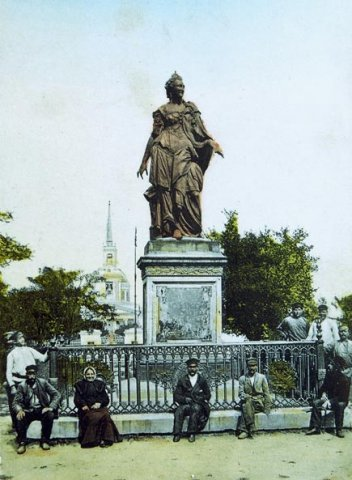
Catherine the Great monument in Ekaterinoslav (1840–1920). This monument that stood in front of the Mining Institute was replaced by Soviet authorities with one of Russian academic Mikhail Lomonosov.

==== Establishment of Catherine's city ====
The first written mention of a town in the Russian Empire called Yekaterinoslav can be found in a report from Azov Governor Vasily Chertkov to Grigory Potemkin on 23 April 1776. He wrote "The provincial city called Yekaterinoslav should be the best convenience on the right side of the Dnieper River near Kaydak..." (referring to Novyi Kodak). In 1777, a town named Yekaterinoslav (the glory of Catherine), was built to the north of the present-day city at the confluence of the Samara and Kilchen rivers. The site was badly chosen – spring waters transformed the city into a bog. The surviving settlement was later renamed Novomoskovsk.

The territory of modern Dnipro, despite the modern-day city's size, still has not expanded to encompass the territory of (Chertkov's) Yekaterinoslav of 1776. On 22 January 1784 Russian Empress Catherine the Great signed an Imperial Ukase directing that "the gubernatorial city under name of Yekaterinoslav be moved to the right bank of the Dnieper river near Kodak". The new city would serve Grigory Potemkin as a Viceregal seat for the combined Novorossiya and Azov Governorates.

On 20 May [O.S. 9 May] 1787, in the course of her celebrated Crimean journey, the Empress laid the foundation stone of the Transfiguration Cathedral in the presence of Austrian Emperor Joseph II, Polish king Stanisław August Poniatowski, and the French and English ambassadors. Potemkin's grandiose plans for a third Russian imperial capital alongside Moscow and Saint Petersburg included a viceregal palace, a university (Potemkin envisioned Yekaterinoslav as the 'Athens of southern Russia'), courts of law and a botanical garden, were frustrated by a renewal of the Russo-Turkish war in 1787, by bureaucratic procrastination, defective workmanship, and theft, Potemkin's death in 1791 and that of his imperial patroness five years later.

In 1815 a government official described the town as "more like some Dutch [Mennonite] colony then a provincial administrative centre". The cathedral, much reduced in size, was completed in 1835.

===== Disputed year of foundation =====
Scholarship concerning the foundation of the city has been subject to political considerations and dispute. In 1976, to have the bicentenary of the city coincide with the 70th anniversary of the birth of Soviet party leader, and regional native son, Leonid Brezhnev, the date of the city's foundation was moved back from the visit Russian Empress Catherine II in 1787, to 1776.

Following Ukrainian independence, local historians began to promote the idea of a town emerging in the 17th century from Cossack settlements, an approach aimed at promoting the city's Ukrainian identity. They cited the chronicler of the Zaporozhian Cossacks, Dmytro Yavornytsky, whose History of the City of Ekaterinoslav completed in 1940 was authorised for publication only in 1989, the era of Glasnost.

In December 2025 the Dnipro City Council was in an ongoing consulting process with experts to set a new official year of Dnipro's foundation. According to them the official year of founding 1776 "is a myth of imperial Russia", and that the city existed many years before 1776.

==== Growth as an industrial centre ====
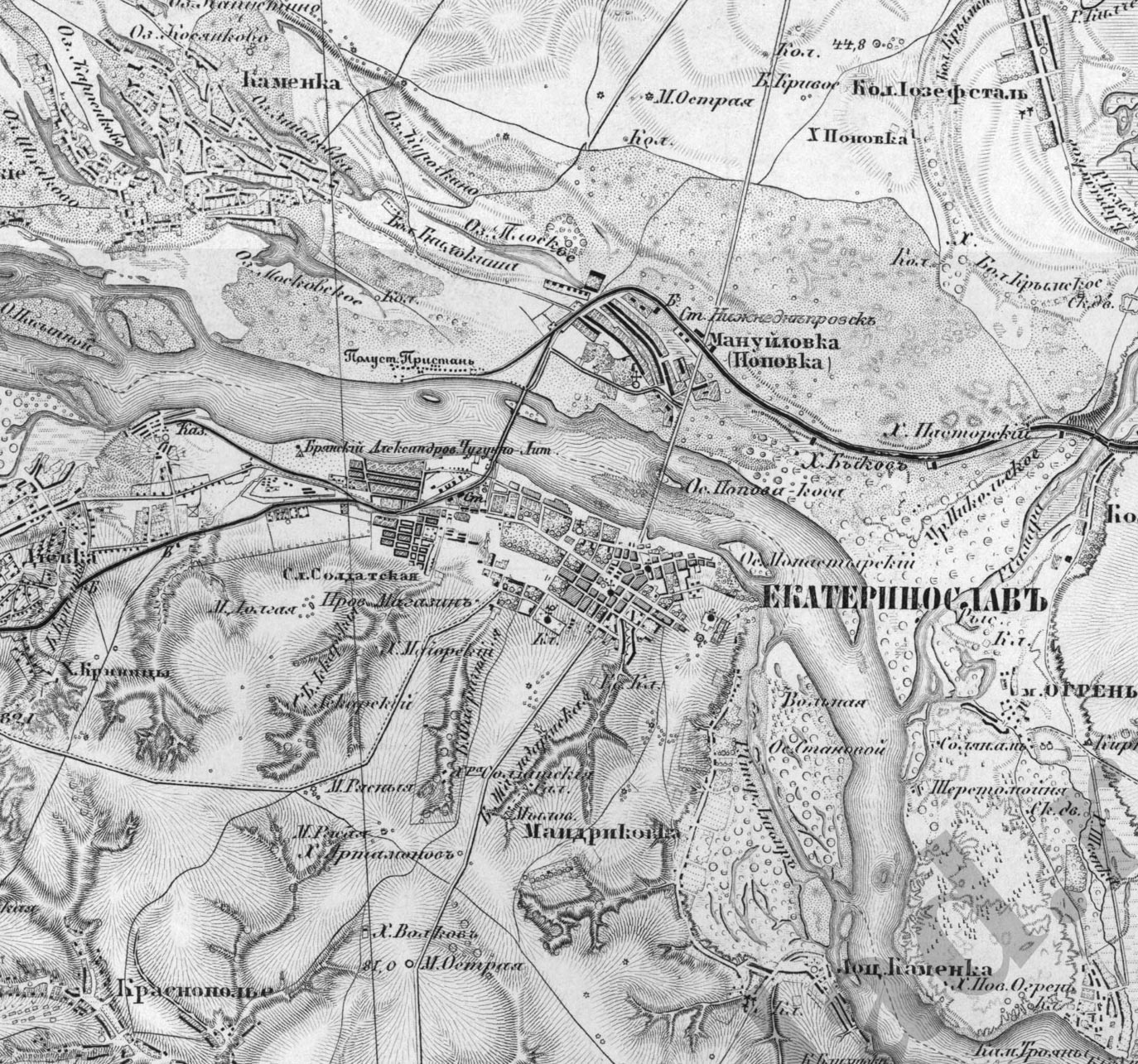
A map of Ekaterinoslav, 1885 (Note: There is some confusion concerning the date of this map. According to the image file the map is by Schubert and dates from about 1860, but Ukrainian Wikipedia claims that it dates from 1885. The map shows the old (railway) Amur Bridge across the river, which was completed in 1884.)

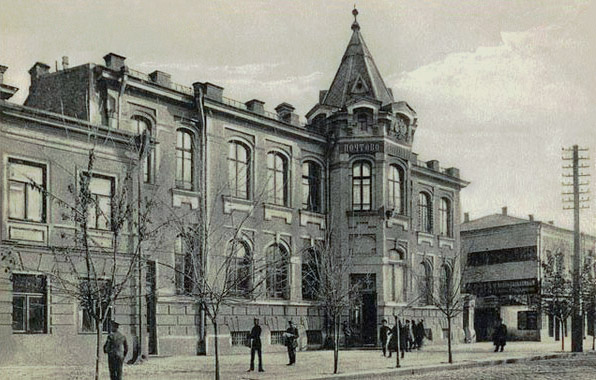
The Main Post Office, 1870

While into the late nineteenth century the principal business of the town remained the processing of agricultural raw materials, there was an early state-sponsored effort to promote manufacture. In 1794 the government supported two factories: a textile factory that was transferred from the town of Dubrovny Mogilev Governorate and a silk-stockings factory that was brought from the village of Kupavna near Moscow. In 1797 the textile factory employed 819 permanent workers, 378 of whom were women and 115 children. The silk stocking workers, the majority being women, were serfs bought at an auction for 16,000 roubles. Conditions, as Potemkin himself was forced to admit, were harsh, with many of the workers dying from malnutrition and exhaustion.

From 1797 to 1802, while serving under the Emperor Paul I as the administrative centre of a centre of the Novorossiya Governorate, the settlement was officially known as Novorossiysk.

Despite the bridging of the Dnieper in 1796, commerce was slow to develop. 1832 saw the establishment of the small Zaslavsky iron-casting factory, the town's first metallurgical enterprise. Industrialisation gathered apace in the 1880s with the establishment of the first railway connections. Rail construction responded to the enterprise of two men: John Hughes, a Welsh businessman who built an iron works at Yuzovka in 1869–72, and developed the Donbas coal deposits; and the Russian geologist Alexander Pol, who in 1866 had discovered the Krivoy Rog iron ore basin, Krivbass, during archaeological research.

In 1884, a railway to supply pig iron foundries in Krivoy Rog with Donbass coal crossed the Dnieper at Yekaterinoslav. It proved a spur to further industrial development and to the creation of the new suburbs of Amur and Nyzhnodniprovsk.

In 1897, Yekaterinoslav became the third city in the Russian Empire to have electric trams. The Yekaterinoslav Higher Mining School, today's Dnipro Polytechnic, was founded in 1899. Within twenty years the population had more than tripled, reaching 157,000 in 1904. The immigrants flowing into the city were mainly ethnic or cultural Russians and Jews, with the Ukrainian population remaining rural in this stage of the Industrial Revolution.

==== The Jewish community and the 1905 pogrom ====
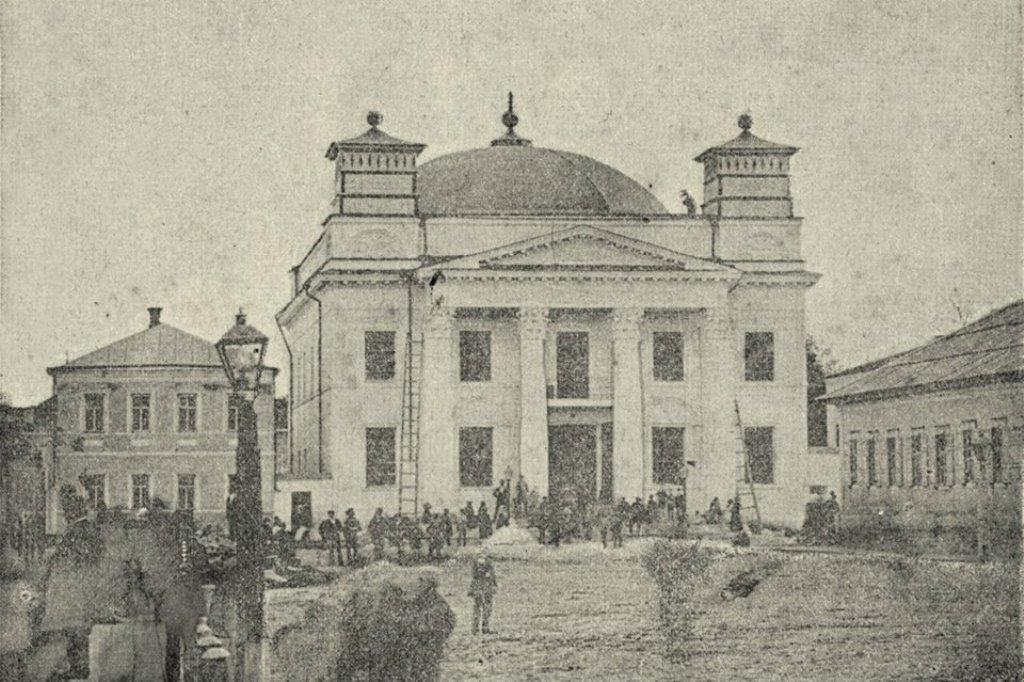
Great Synagogue during the 19th century

From 1792 Yekaterinoslav was within the Pale of Settlement, the former Polish-Lithuanian territories in which Catherine and her successors enforced no limitation on the movement and residency of their Jewish subjects. Within less than a century, a largely Yiddish-speaking Jewish community of 40,000 constituted more than a third of the city's population, and contributed a considerable share of its business capital and industrial workforce.

Such apparent strength did not protect the community—members of whom had had the unpopular task of collecting government taxes and recruiting young men for the army— from communal violence. In 1883, three days of rioting destroyed Jewish business, and persuaded many to temporarily leave the city. There was a return of anti–Semitic incitement among the Christian public in 1904, but attacks on community were, at that time, suppressed on the order of a liberal governor.

In the widespread social unrest that followed the 1905 defeat in the Russo-Japanese War, the political life of the city was dominated by the revolutionary opposition (including the Jewish Workers Socialist Party and the Bund) and by the insurrectionary spirit of the nascent labor movement. The local czarist authorities were able to ride out the wave political protests and strikes, in part by playing on division between Jewish workers who predominated as clerks and artisans in the city, and Russian workers employed in the large suburban factories. There was a wave of anti-Semitic attacks. With the army intervening against Jewish defense groups, about 100 Jews were killed and two hundred wounded.

According to local historian Andrii Portnov, 40% of the local Yekaterinoslav population was Jewish in the years leading up to World War I.

=== The Soviet era ===
==== War and revolution ====
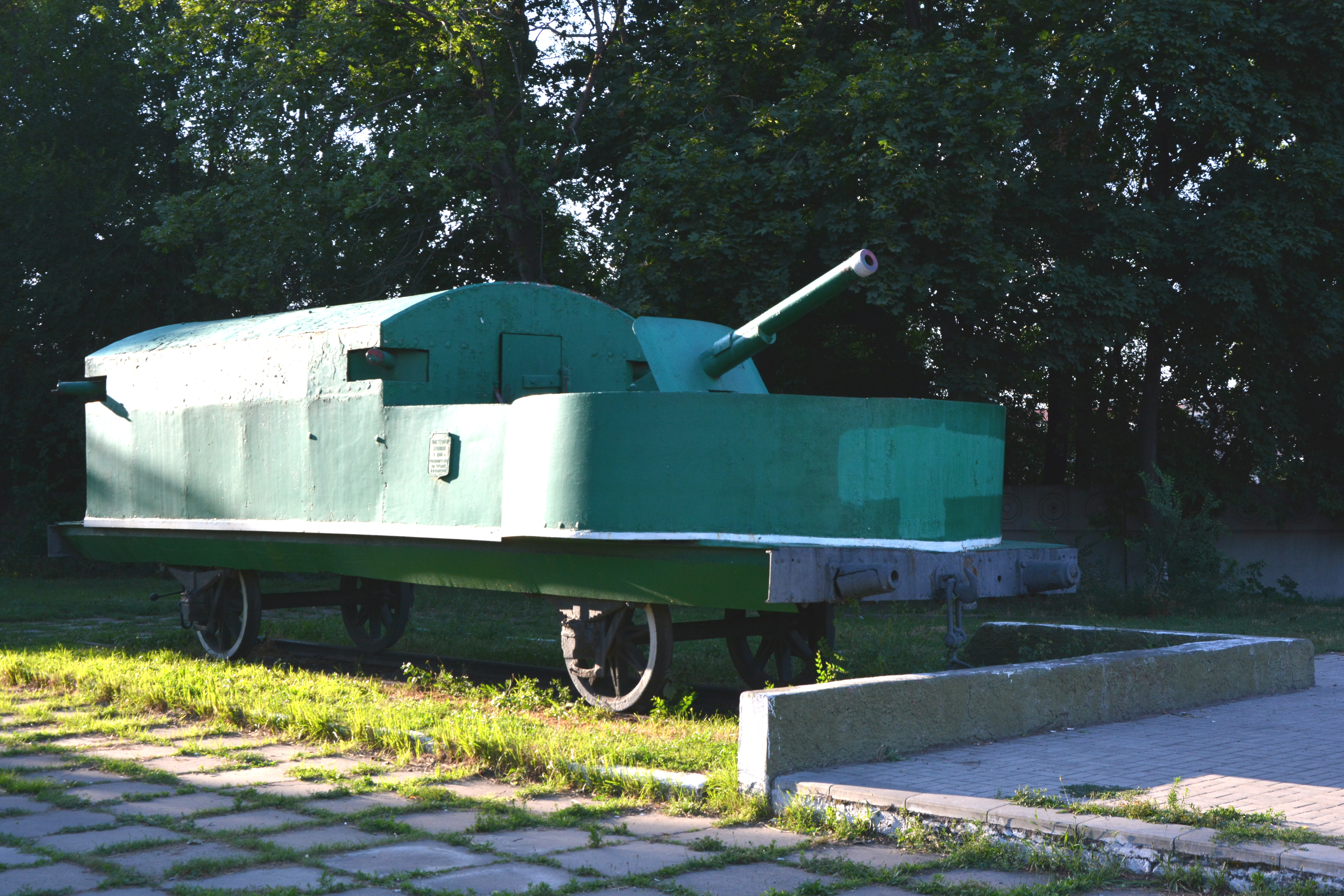
Monument in Dnipro of an armored train that was built by the workers of Yekaterinoslav's Bryansk plant in 1918, which was employed by the Red Army in its conquest of Ukraine and the Volga region.

Directly following the Russian February Revolution, in the night of 3 March O.S (16 March N.S) to 4 March 1917 a provisional government was organised in Yekaterinoslav headed by the (since 1913) chairman of the provincial land administration Konstantin von Hesberg. Also on 4 March a Council of Workers' Deputies was formed. On 6 March the prime minister of the Russian Provisional Government Georgy Lvov removed the governor and the vice-governor of Yekaterinoslav Governorate, temporarily handing these powers to Hesberg. On 9 March a Yekaterinoslav Council of Workers and Soldiers deputies was formed.

On 16 May the Council of Workers' Deputies and the Council of Workers and Soldiers merged, to become named the Revolutionary Council in November 1917. All these power structures existed in duality, with Hesberg's provisional government often being at a disadvantage. In 1917 the city saw numerous meetings, rallies, meetings, conferences, congresses and demonstrations by political parties all over the political spectrum. Due to intense political agitation the newly formed factory committees and professional unions by autumn of 1917 mainly supported the Bolsheviks, significantly strengthening their positions.

In June 1917 a Central Council (Tsentralna Rada) of Ukrainian parties in Kyiv declared Yekaterinoslav to be within the territory of an autonomous self-governing Ukraine. On 13 August 1917, democratic elections took place for the 120-seat city Duma. The Bolsheviks gained 24 seats and the Mensheviks 16, with pro-Ukrainian parties picking up 6 seats. Vasyl Osipov was elected Mayor of the city and remained in post until the dissolution of the city Duma in May 1918.

On the 25 November 1917 elections were held for the Russian Constituent Assembly. The Bolsheviks secured just under 18 per cent of the vote in the Governorate, compared to 46 per cent for the Ukrainian Socialist Revolutionaries and their allies. Two week before the all-Russian elections, there had been a military parade organized by the Yekaterinoslav Ukrainian Military Council in support of the proclamation of the Ukrainian People's Republic (in a still-to-be-determined union with Russia) by the Ukrainian Central Rada. When, on 22 November 1917, the Revolutionary Council and the city Duma pledged their allegiance to the Central Rada and the UPR, the Bolsheviks left these organisations and both sides in the city prepared for military action.

On 26 December, the Bolsheviks defied an ultimatum from the Central Rada and after three days of fighting consolidated their control of the city. On 12 February they declared Yekaterinoslav part of a Donetsk-Krivoy Rog Soviet Republic, but the following month, under the terms of the Treaty of Brest-Litovsk, conceded the territory to the German and Austrian-allied UPR. On 5 April 1918 the Imperial German army entered the city. Five hundred remaining Bolshevik Red Guards were publicly executed.

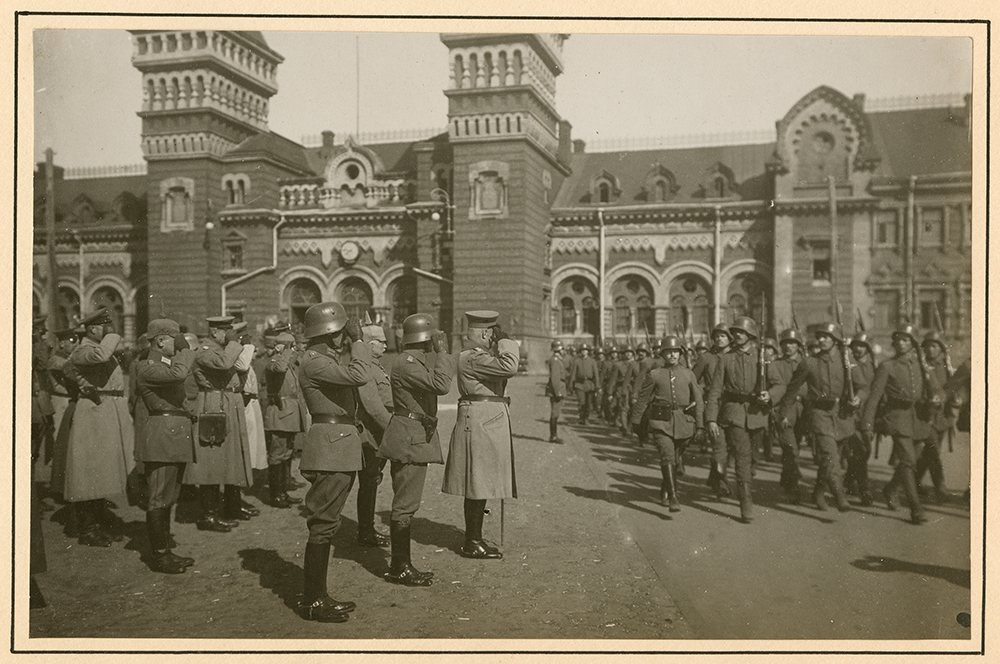
A German military parade in Yekaterinoslav in spring 1918.

The formal tenure of a formally sovereign UPR was brief: on 29 April 1918 intervention by the Central Powers saw the UPR replaced by the more pliant Ukrainian State or Hetmanate. On 18 May 1918 the Hetman of the Ukrainian State, Pavlo Skoropadskyi, ordered the previously nationalized enterprises returned to their former owners, and with the assistance of Austro-Hungarian troops the new authorities suppressed labor protest.

On 23 December 1918, following their defeat by the Western Allies and after four days of insurgency within the city, German and Austro-Hungarian occupation forces withdrew. Four days later, Yekaterinoslav was stormed by the anarchist Revolutionary Insurgent Army of Ukraine (the Makhnovshchina), putting to flight forces loyal to the UPR's new Directorate. Over the course of the following year, city was to change hands several more times, contested between the UPR, the Whites (Armed Forces of South Russia), Nykyfor Hryhoriv's peasant insurgents, Makhnovshchina (who returned twice), and the Bolsheviks, who reorganised as the Red Army, finally secured the city on 30 December 1919.

The city had been extensively damaged and the population, which had stood at about 268,000 people in 1917, had dropped to under 190,000.

==== Soviet-era industrialisation ====
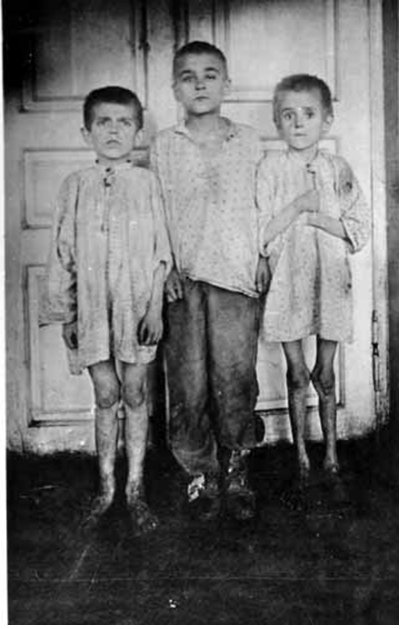
The boy on the left murdered an 8-year-old for his 4 pounds of bread in Yekaterinoslav in 1922, during the local 1921–1923 famine.

In late May 1920 the food supply to Yekaterinoslav deteriorated, resulting in a wave of strikes. In June 1920 Soviet authorities quelled one such protest by arresting 200 railway workers, of which 51 were sentenced to immediate execution.

In 1922 the region was incorporated into the Ukrainian SSR, a constituent republic of the Soviet Union. In 1922 the Soviet government ordered that "all nationalized enterprises with names related to the Company or the Surname of the old owners must be renamed in memory of revolutionary events, in memory of the international, all-Russian or local leaders of the proletarian revolution." In 1922 and 1923 the factories were renamed, as well as dozens of streets, alleys, driveways, squares and parks. In 1923 the city council adopted a resolution to organize a competition to rename the city itself.

In 1924 a Provincial Congress of Soviets adopted a resolution on renaming the city of Yekaterinoslav to the city of Krasnodniprovsk (and Yekaterinoslav Governorate to Krasnodniprovsk). Following this, many organizations and institutions began to name Yekaterinoslav Krasnodniprovsk in official documents, only to be reminded in the press that the renaming of settlements could only be decided by the Presidium of the Supreme Soviet. In 1926 a provisional District Congress of Workers', Peasants' and Soldiers' Deputies adopted a resolution on renaming Yekaterinoslav to the name Dnipropetrovsk in honour of the All-Ukrainian Congress of Soviets's chairman of the All-Ukrainian Central Executive Committee, Grigory Petrovsky.

Petrovsky was present at this congress and he did "accept this honour with great gratitude." The resolution of the congress was approved by a resolution of the Presidium of the Supreme Soviet dated 20 July 1926. In the 1920s and 1930s dozens of streets, alleys, driveways, squares and parks continued to be renamed in the city, this continued in the 1940s and in subsequent years.

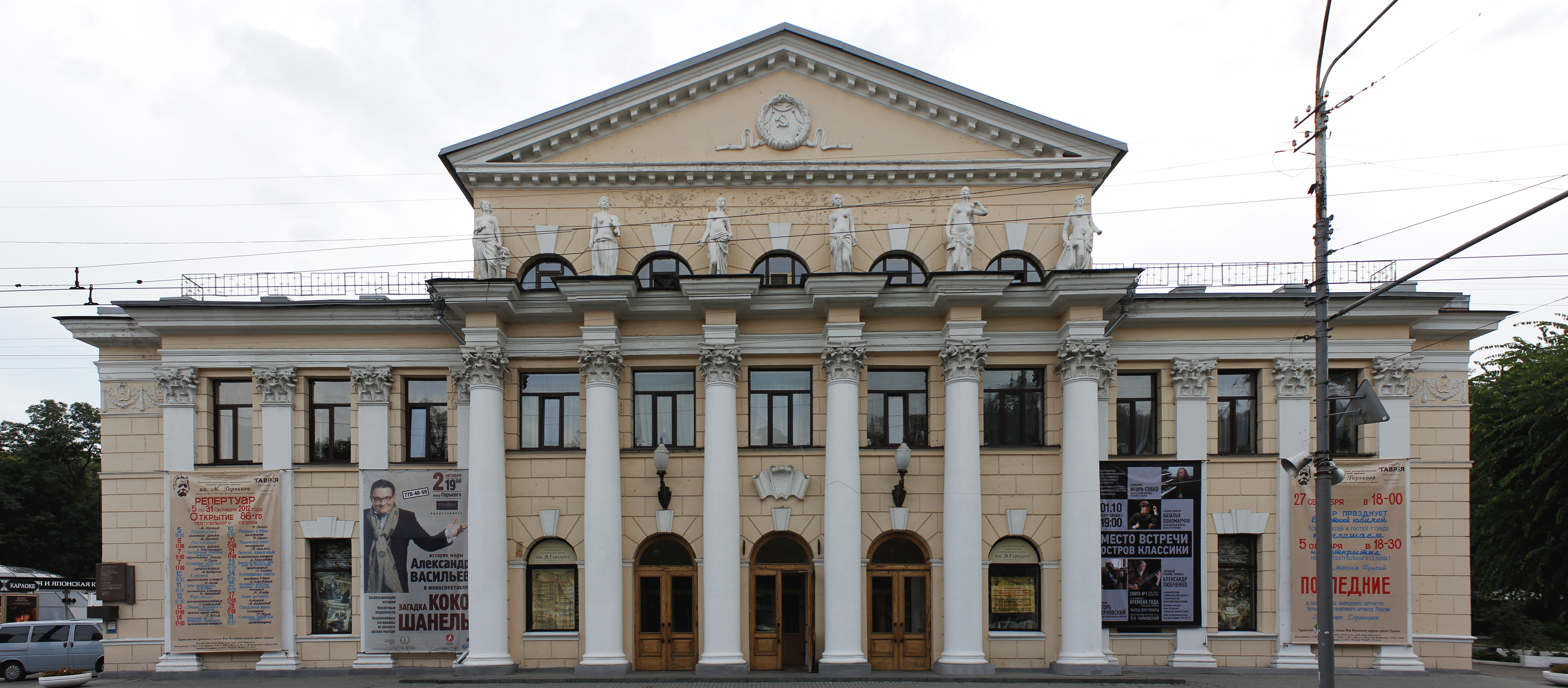
Dnipro Academic Drama and Comedy Theatre was constructed during the Stalinist period.

By 1927 the industry of Dnipropetrovsk was completely rebuilt. The population according to some indicators exceeded pre-war levels, swollen by an influx of the destitute from the ravaged countryside and of the unemployed from other settlements. Employment and unemployment rose simultaneously, and the authorities had to contend with growing labour unrest. "Do not strangle us, our children are dying of hunger, we have been placed in worse conditions than under the old regime" read one protest.

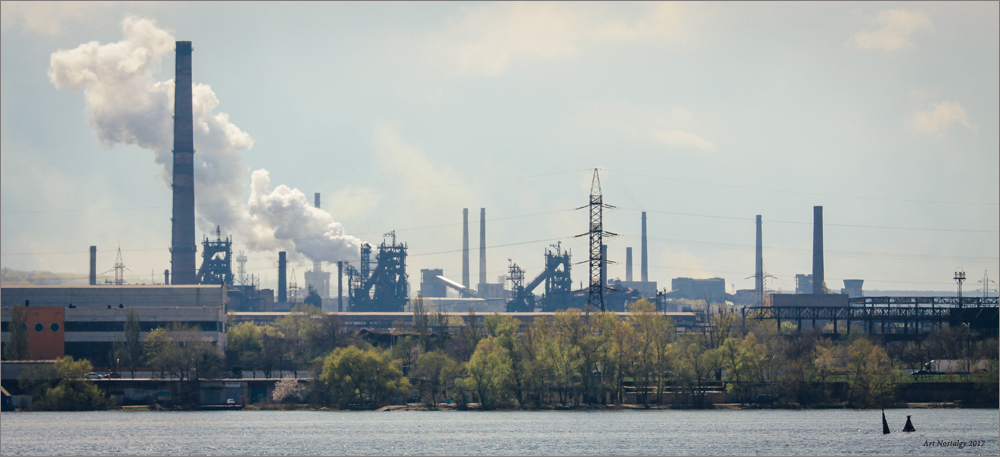
Modern view of Dnipro Metallurgical Factory

The city figured prominently in Stalin's Five-Year Plans for industrialisation. In 1932, Dnipropetrovsk's regional metallurgical plants produced 20 percent of the entire cast iron and 25 percent of the steel manufactured in the Ukrainian SSR. By the end of the thirties the Dnipropetrovsk region became the most urbanised of Soviet Ukraine with more than 2,273,000 people living in the region and over half a million in the city proper. Dnipropetrovsk became an important cultural and educational centre with ten colleges and a State University.

The surrounding countryside, which had only begun to recover from the civil war, was devastated by the policy of forced collectivisation and grain seizures. Peasants had died en masse during the Holodomor of 1932–33. Estimates of the losses in Dnipropetrovsk Oblast in the years 1932–33 range from 3.5 to 9.8 million people, making it one of the most affected areas of the famine.

Drawn by employment in the expanding heavy industry, the survivors changed the ethnic composition of the city. The percentage of residents recorded as Ukrainian rose from 36 per cent of the population in 1926 to 54.6 per cent in 1939. The Russian percentage fell from 31.6 to 23.4, and the Jewish share fell from 26.8 to 17.9. The city's population during the Interwar period grew rapidly. 368,000 people lived in Dnipropetrovsk in 1932. In the 1939 Soviet Census, this number had grown to more than half a million (500,662 people).

Soviet Ukrainization and Korenizatsiya were implemented in Dnipropetrovsk. The Communist party of Ukraine organized special courses in Ukrainian studies. Soviet authorities greatly increased the number of schools, and by the mid-1930s had eradicate illiteracy in the city. New universities were opened. At the end of the 1930s Dnipropetrovsk had 10 higher and 19 special educational institutions. In the 1930s a significant number of new secondary schools and hospitals were built in the city, and city parks were improved.

The Great Purge, following the Assassination of Sergei Kirov, also reached Dnipropetrovsk. In 1935 the Dnipropetrovsk NKVD arrested 182 "Trotskyists". In 1935, 235 alleged "internal enemies" were executed, including a few university rectors. In 1936, 526 people were executed. In 1937, the regional administration of the NKVD killed 16,421 people.

==== Nazi occupation ====
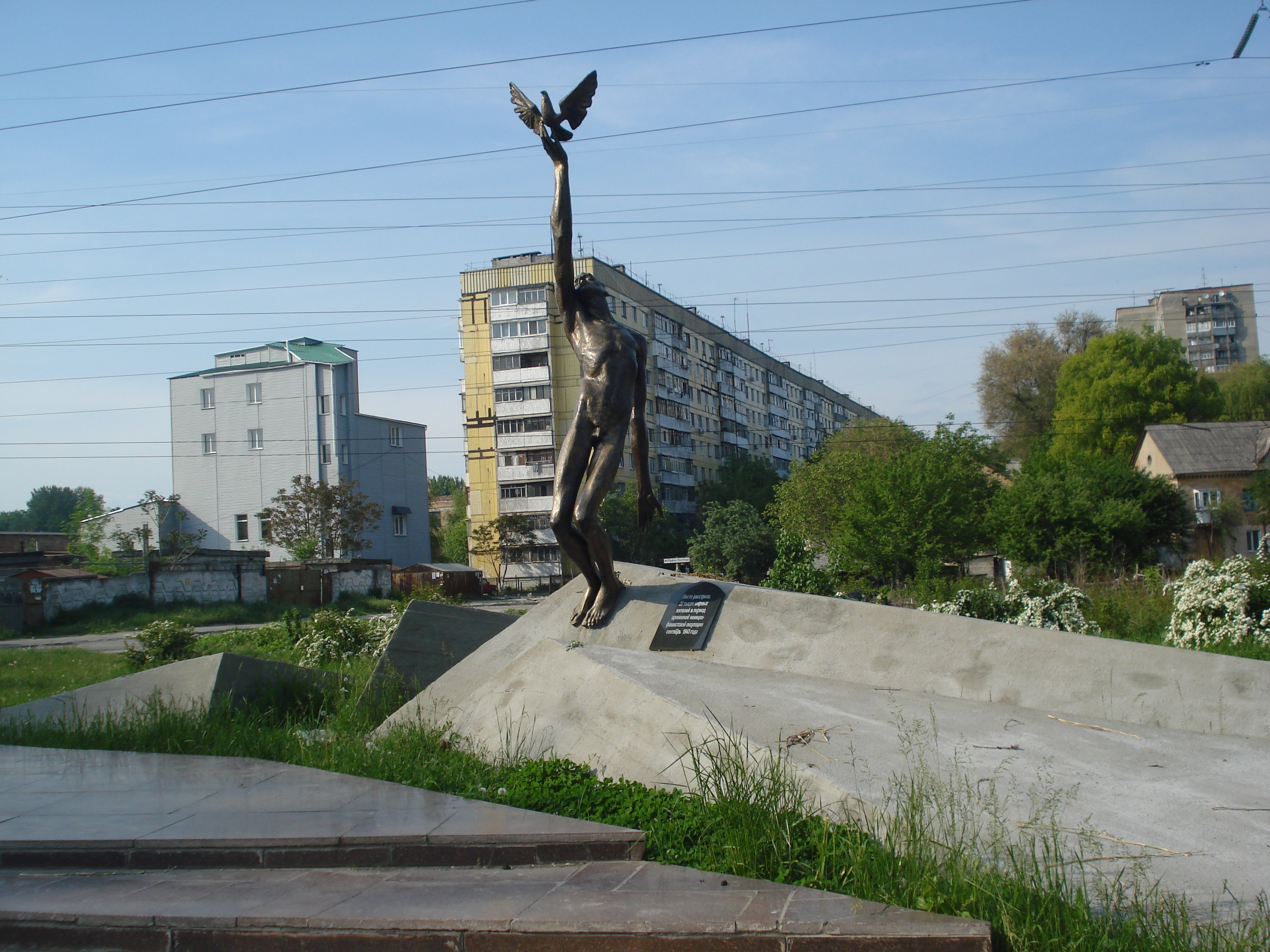
Monument to 20,000 Jews shot by Germans in 1943 in Dnipropetrovsk. The monumental inscription (in Russian) does not explicitly identify the victims as Jewish, but speaks of "20,000 civilians."

Dnipropetrovsk was under Nazi German occupation from 26 August 1941 to 25 October 1943. The city was administered as part of the Reichskommissariat Ukraine. The Holocaust in Dnipropetrovsk reduced the city's remaining Jewish population, estimates for which range from 55,000 to 30,000, to just 702. In just two days, 13–14 October 1941, the Germans killed 15,000.

Germany operated three prisoner-of-war camps in the city, chiefly Stalag 348 with several subcamps in the region from October 1941 to February 1943, after its relocation from Rzeszów in German-occupied Poland, at which the occupiers are estimated to have killed upwards of 30,000 Soviet POWs, and briefly also the Stalag 310 and Stalag 387 camps.

In November 1941 Dnipropetrovsk's population was 233,000. In March 1942 this number had fallen to 178,000. On 25 October 1943 the population on the right-bank of the city numbered no more than 5,000. According to official statistics, in 1945 the population of Dnipropetrovsk had increased to 259,000 people.

==== Post-war closed city ====
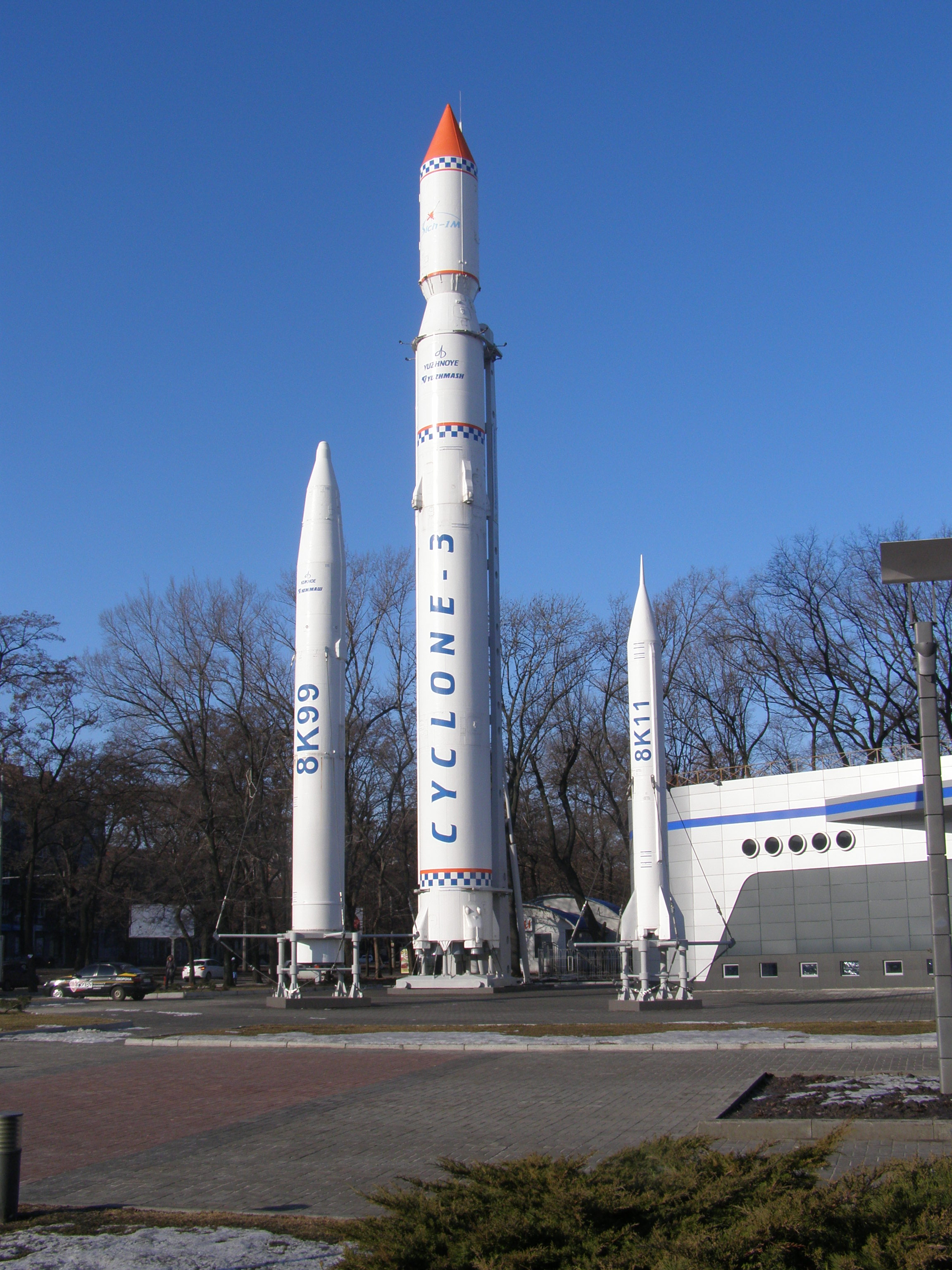
A Yuzhmash produced Tsyklon-3 rocket, flanked by an RT-20P and R-11 Zemlya on display in Dnipro's "Rocket Park".

As early as July 1944, the State Committee of Defence in Moscow decided to build a large military machine-building factory in Dnipropetrovsk on the location of the pre-war aircraft plant. In December 1945, thousands of German prisoners of war began construction and built the first sections and shops in the new factory. This was the foundation of the Dnipropetrovsk Automobile Factory. In 1954 the administration of this automobile factory opened a secret design office, designated OKB-586, to construct military missiles and rocket engines.

The high-security project was joined by hundreds of physicists, engineers and machine designers from Moscow and other large Soviet cities. In 1965, the secret Plant No. 586 was transferred to the USSR Ministry of General Machine-Building which renamed it "the Southern Machine-building Factory" (Yuzhnyi mashino-stroitel'nyi zavod) or in abbreviated Russian, simply Yuzhmash. Yuzhmash became a significant factor in the arms race of the Cold War (Nikita Khrushchev boasted in 1960 that it was producing rockets "like sausages").

In 1959, Dnipropetrovsk was officially closed to foreign visitors. No foreign citizen, even of a socialist state, was allowed to visit the city or district. Its citizens were held by Communist authorities to a higher standard of ideological purity than the rest of the population, and their freedom of movement was severely restricted. It was not until 1987, during perestroika, that Dnipropetrovsk was opened to international visitors and civil restrictions were lifted.

The population of Dnipropetrovsk increased from 259,000 people in 1945 to 845,200 in 1965.

Notwithstanding the high-security regime, in September and October 1972, workers downed tools in several factories in Dnipropetrovsk demanding higher wages, better food and living conditions, and the right to choose one's job. Labour militancy returned in the late 1980s, a period in which promises of Perestrioka and Glasnost raised popular expectations. In 1990 two thousand inmates rioted in the women's remand prison in a further of sign of growing unrest.

==== Dissent and youth rebellion ====
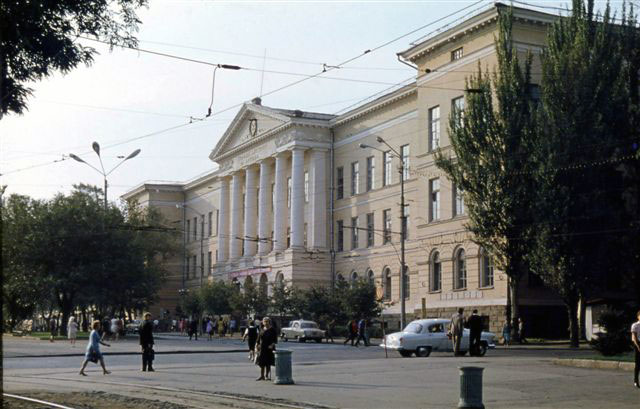
Dnipropetrovsk's Mining Institute, 1972.

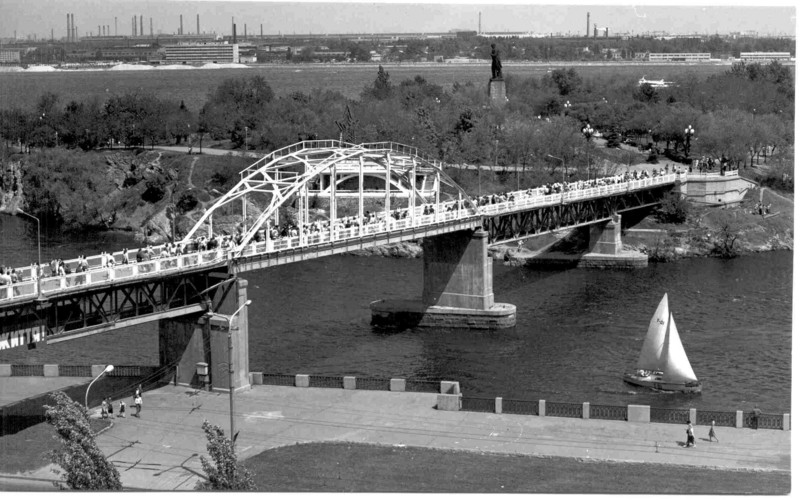
Bridge to Monastery Island (then known as Komsomol Island) during the 1980s

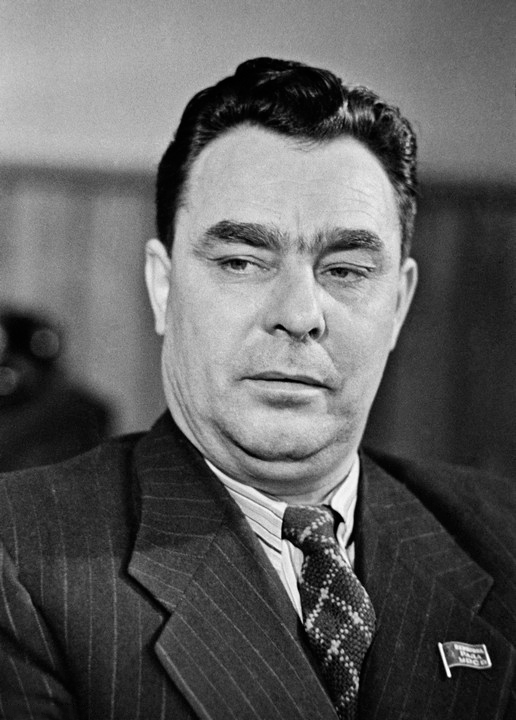
A 1949 photo portrait of Leonid Brezhnev, a native of Dnipropetrovsk region, who would serve as de facto head of the Soviet Union between 1964 and 1982

In 1959 17.4% of Dnipropetrovsk school pupils were taught in Ukrainian language schools and 82.6% in Russian language schools. 58% of the city's inhabitants, whose numbers continued to grow with rural immigration, self-identified as Ukrainians. This compared to Kyiv, a city in which 66% of residents considered themselves Ukrainian, where 26.8% of pupils studied in Ukrainian and 73.1% in Russian. (Note: At the start of the 2018–2019 academic year, there were 31 Russian-speaking secondary schools left in the whole of Dnipropetrovsk Oblast. At the time the conversion of these 31 schools to Ukrainian language education was planned to be completed by 2023.)

According to KGB reports, in the 1960s "Samizdat" and Ukrainian diaspora publications began to circulate via Western Ukraine in Dnipropetrovsk. These fed into underground student circles where they promoted interest in the "Ukrainian Sixtiers", in Ukrainian history, especially of Ukrainian Cossacks, and in the revival of the Ukrainian language. Occasionally the blue and yellow flag of independent Ukraine was unfurled in protest. The authorities responded with repression: arresting and jailing members of underground discussion groups for "nationalistic propaganda".

The growing evidence of dissent in the city coincided from the late 1960s with what the KGB referred to as "radio hooliganism". Thousands of high-school and college students had become ham radio enthusiasts, recording and rebroadcasting western popular music. Annual KGB reports regularly drew a connection between enthusiasm for western pop culture and anti-Soviet behaviour. In the 1980s, by which time the KGB had conceded that their raids against "hippies" had failed suppress the youth rebellion, (Note: In one of these cases in 1979, because the local Dnipropetrovsk perpetrator was Jewish, a KGB report linked Ukrainian nationalism with Jewish Zionism "by promoting dance music". In this case the (according to the KGB employee "American") band the Bee Gees.) such behaviour was reportedly found in an admixture of Anglo-American" heavy metal, punk rock and Banderism—the veneration of Stepan Bandera, and of other Ukrainian nationalists, who in the Soviet narrative were denounced and discredited as Nazi collaborators.

In an attempt to provide Dnipropetrovsk youth with an ideologically safe alternative, beginning in 1976 the local Komsomol set up approved discotheques. Some of the activists involved in this "disco movement" went on in the 1980s to engage in their own illicit tourist and music enterprises, and several later became influential figures in Ukrainian national politics, among them Yulia Tymoshenko, Victor Pinchuk, Serhiy Tihipko, Ihor Kolomoyskyi and Oleksandr Turchynov.

==== The "Dnipropetrovsk Mafia" ====
Reflecting Dnipropetrovsk's special strategic importance for the entire Soviet Union, party cadres from the "rocket city" played an outsized role not only in republican leadership in Kyiv, but also in the Union leadership in Moscow. During Stalin's Great Purge, Leonid Brezhnev rose rapidly within the ranks of the local nomenklatura, from director of the Dnipropetrovsk Metallurgical Institute in 1936 to regional (Obkom) Party Secretary in charge of the city's defence industries in 1939.

Here, he took the first steps toward building a network of supporters which came to be known as the "Dnipropetrovsk Mafia". They spearheaded the internal party coup that in 1964 saw Brezhnev replace Nikita Khrushchev as General Secretary of the Communist Party of the Soviet Union and call a halt to further reform.

=== Independent Ukraine ===
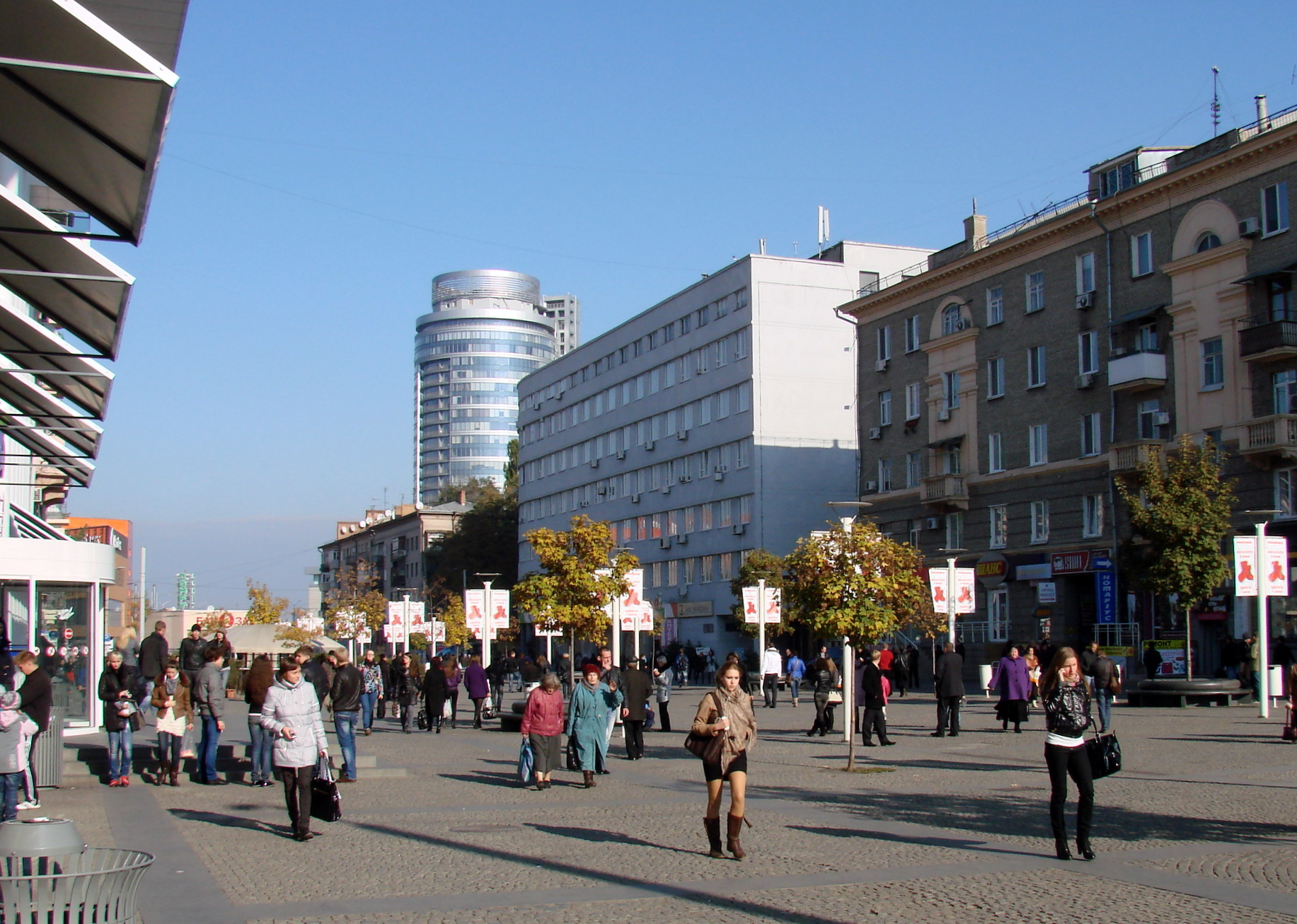
European Square in central Dnipropetrovsk during the 2000s

In a national referendum on 1 December 1991, 90.36% of Dnipropetrovsk's voters approved the declaration of independence that had been made by the Ukrainian parliament on 24 August. Amidst the economic dislocation and soaring inflation that accompanied the collapse of the Soviet Union, output declined. Although its economic contraction was at a rate below the national average, the Dnipropetrovsk city and oblast witnessed one of the largest population declines of all the regions of Ukraine. By 2021, the city's population, which had stood at over 1.2 million in 1991, had been reduced to 981,000. Young people from Dnipropetrovsk were among the millions of Ukrainians who left the country to find work and opportunity abroad.

The continuation into the new century of the chaotic fallout from the collapse of the Soviet Union was symbolized for many in Dnipropetrovsk by two violent episodes. In June and July 2007, Dnipropetrovsk experienced a wave of random video-recorded serial killings that were dubbed by the media as the work of the "Dnipropetrovsk maniacs". In February 2009, three youths were sentenced for their part in 21 murders, and numerous other attacks and robberies. On 27 April 2012, four bombs exploded near four tram stations in Dnipropetrovsk, injuring 27 people. No one was convicted. Opposition politicians claimed to see the hand of President Viktor Yanukovych intent on disrupting the October 2012 Ukrainian parliamentary election and installing a presidential regime.

==== Euromaidan ====
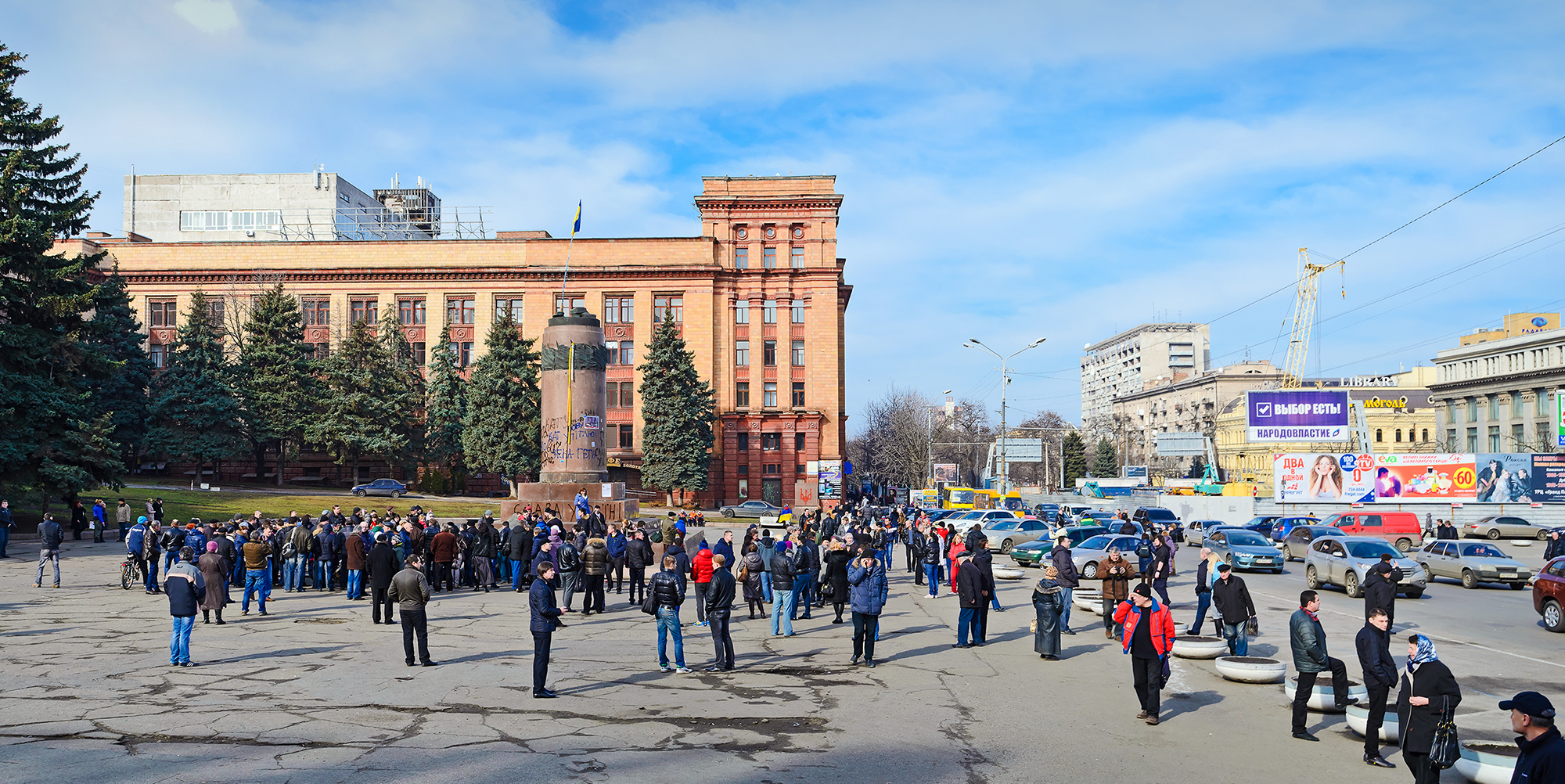
Lenin Square in Dnipropetrovsk on 22 February 2014 with the demolished monuments to Vladimir Lenin.

On 26 January 2014, 3,000 anti-Viktor Yanukovych (Ukrainian President) and pro-Euromaidan activists attempted but failed to capture the Regional State Administration building. There were street disturbances and Euromaidan protesters were reported to be beaten up by paid pro-Yanukovych supporters (the so-called Titushky). Dnipropetrovsk Governor Kolesnikov called them "extreme radical thugs from other regions".

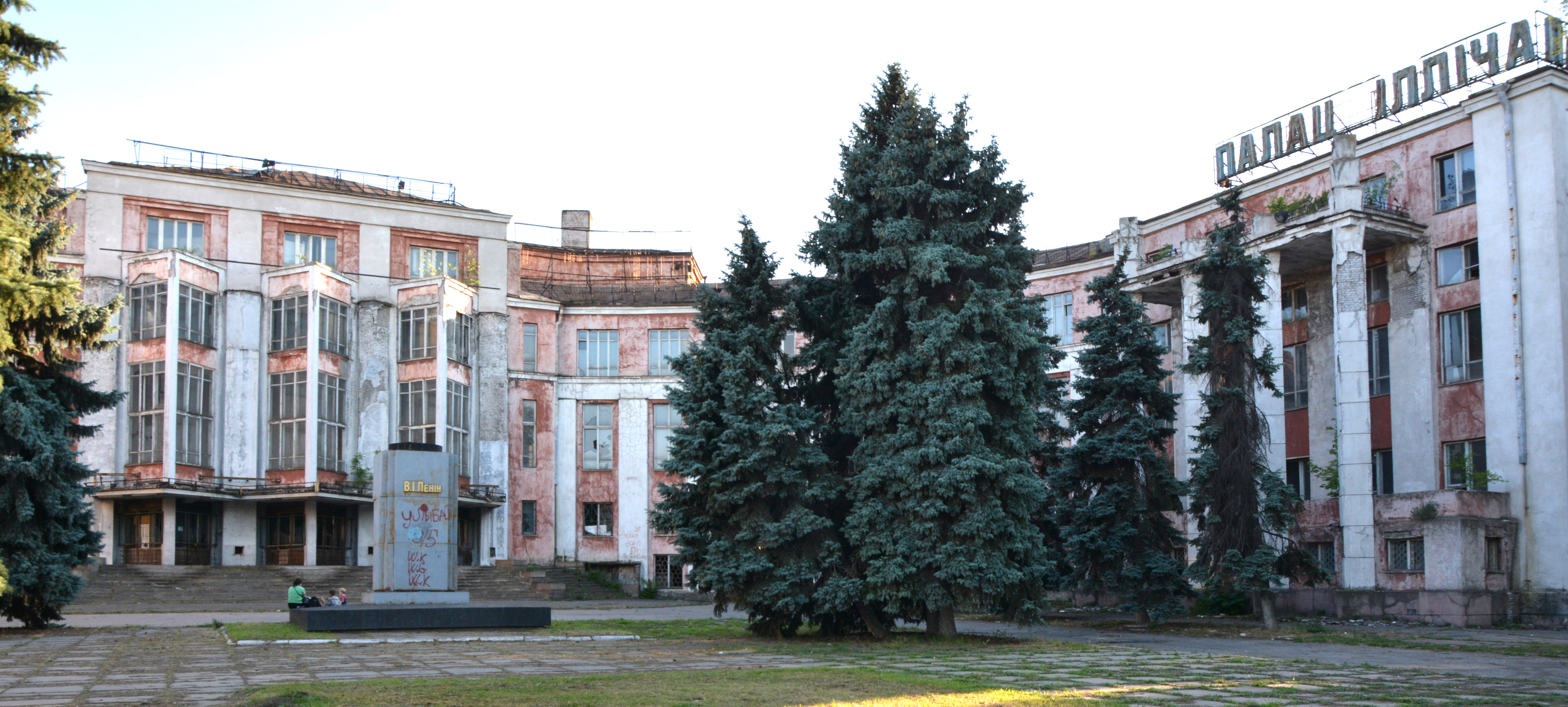
A destroyed monument to Vladimir Lenin on Dnipro's Kalinin Avenue (now Prospekt Serhiy Nigoyan) in October 2014.

Two days later about 2,000 public sector employees called an indefinite rally in support of the Yanukovych government. Meanwhile, the government building was reinforced with barbed wire. On 19 February 2014 there was an anti-Yanukovych picket near the Regional State Administration. On 22 February 2014, after a further anti-Yanukovych demonstration, Dnipropetrovsk Mayor Ivan Kulichenko, for the sake of "peace in the city" left Yanukovych's Party of Regions.

Simultaneously the Dnipropetrovsk City Council vowed to support "the preservation of Ukraine as a single and indivisible state", although some members had called for separatism and for federalization of Ukraine. On the same day, after street fighting in Kyiv, 22 February 2014, Yanukovych left Ukraine and went into Russian exile.

==== 2014 to 2022 ====
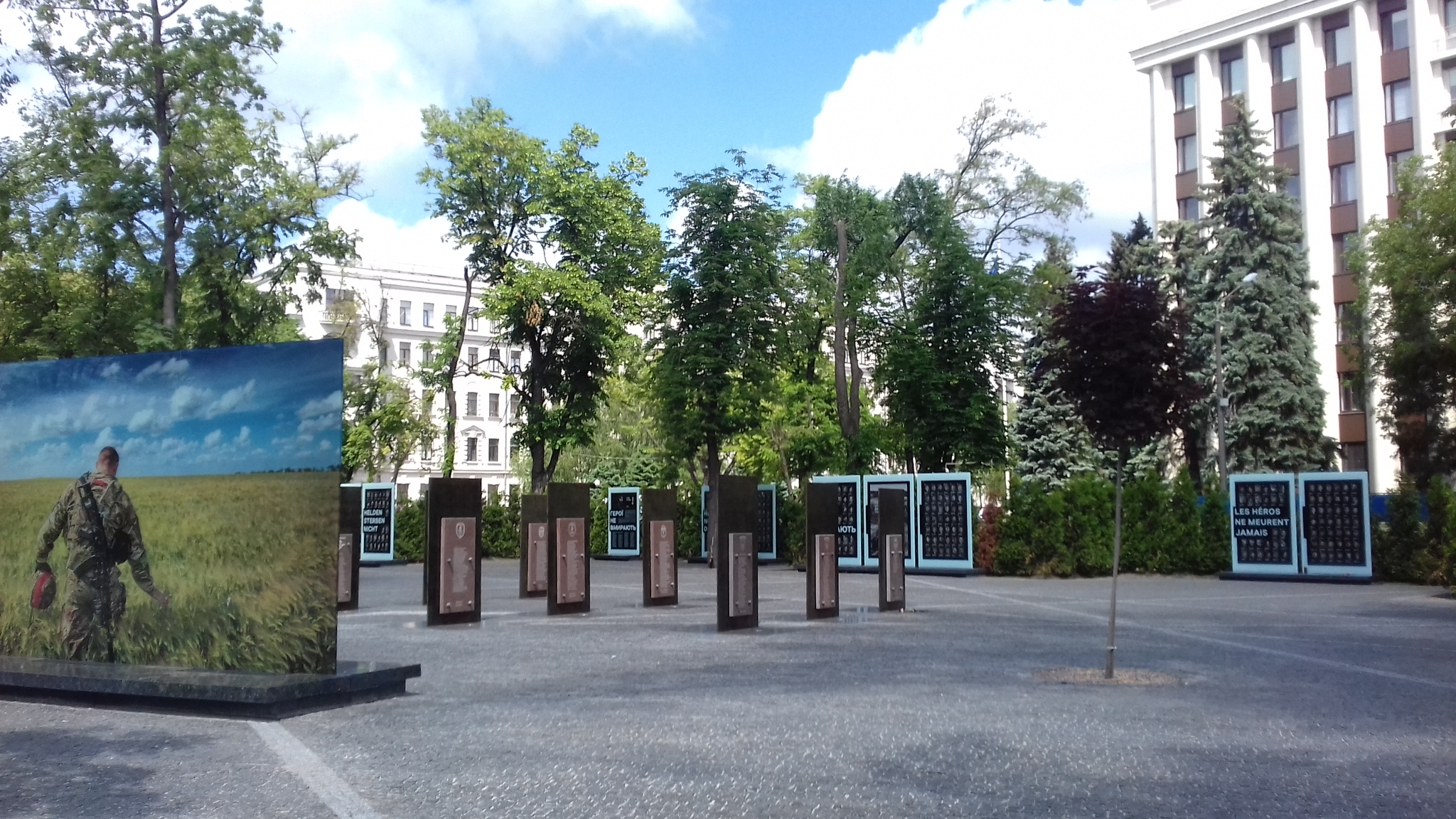
Memorial to the victims of the Russian-Ukrainian War (ATO zone) in Dnipro's city centre in 2018.

Dnipropetrovsk remained relatively quiet during the 2014 pro-Russian unrest in Ukraine, with pro-Russian Federation protestors outnumbered by those opposing outside intervention. In March 2014 the city's Lenin Square was renamed "Heroes of Independence Square" in honor of the people killed during Euromaidan. The statue of Lenin on the square was removed. In June 2014 another Lenin monument was removed and replaced by a monument to the Ukrainian military fighting the Russo-Ukrainian War (2014 – ongoing).

To comply with the 2015 decommunization law the city was renamed Dnipro in May 2016, after the river that flows through the city. By summer 2016 not only was the city renamed, but so were more than 350 streets, alleys, driveways, squares and parks. For example, Karl Marx Avenue, the main street, was renamed Yavornytskyi Avenue in honour of the once neglected city and cossack historian. This was 12 per cent of all of the city's toponymies. Five of the eight urban districts of the city received new names.

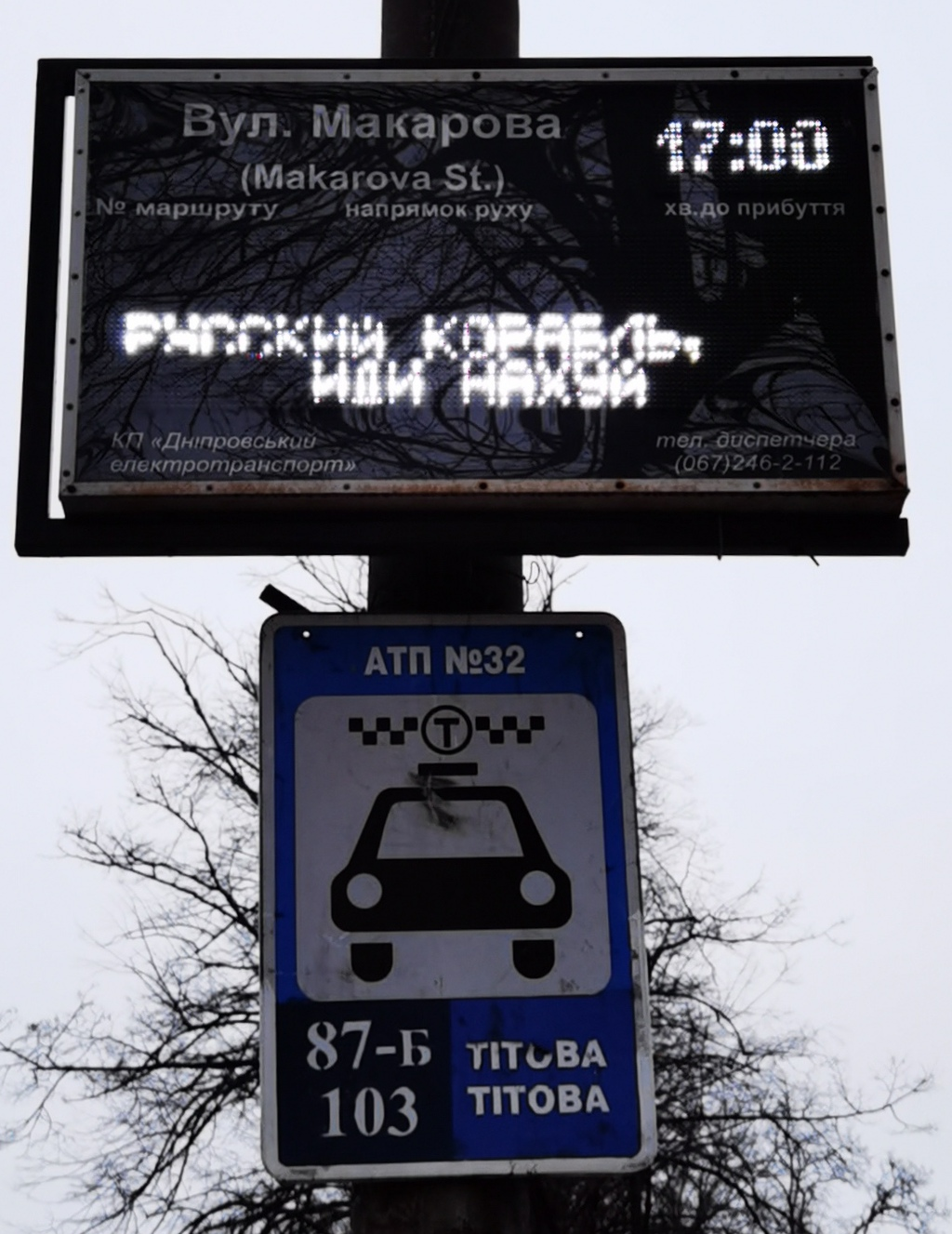
The slogan "Russian warship, go fuck yourself" displayed on a bus stop in Dnipro in February 2022.

==== 2022 Russian invasion of Ukraine ====
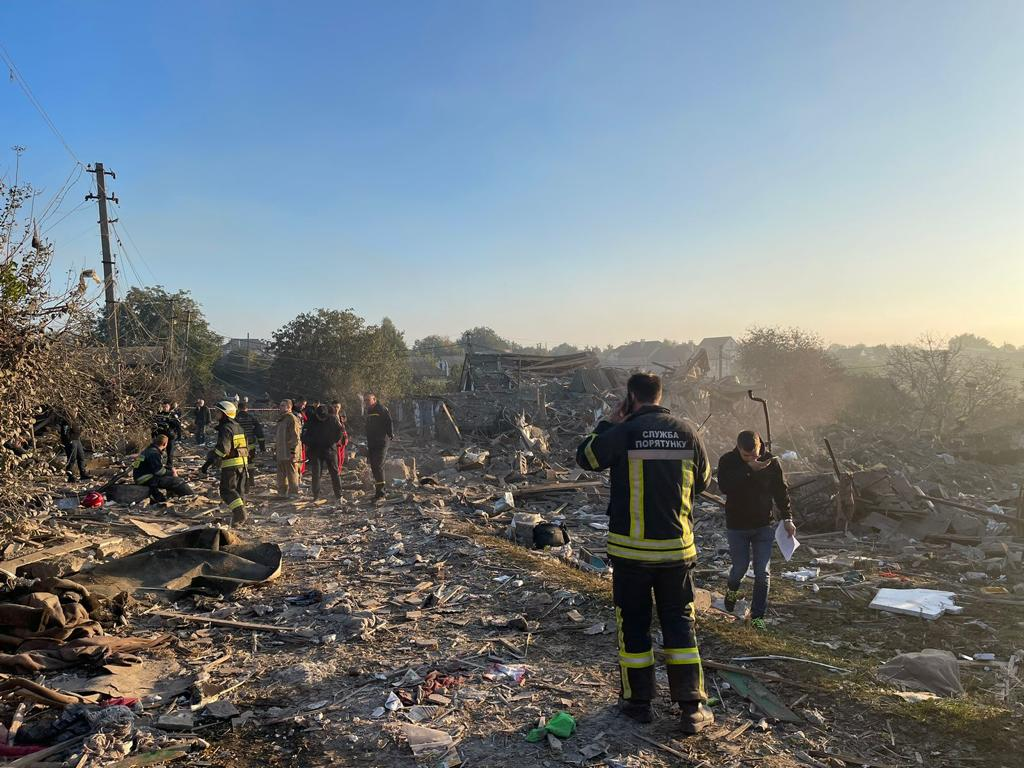
Dnipro city after Russian shelling in the night on 29 September 2022.

In the wake of the full-scale Russian invasion of Ukraine on 24 February 2022, and with developing military fronts near Kyiv and to the north, east and south, Dnipro has become a logistical hub for humanitarian aid and a reception point for people fleeing the war. Roughly equidistant from the war's major theatres in the east and the south, the city's location is proving critical for supplying the Ukrainian defence effort. At the same time, its control of a Dnieper River crossing and the opportunity it would provide to cut off Ukrainian forces in the Donbas makes the city a high-value target for the Russians.

Dnipro is reported as the only city in Ukraine where a volunteer formation has been created under direct control of the Dnipro City Council. It is called the "Dnieper Guard" (Варти Дніпра, Varty Dnipra). The mayor of Dnipro, Borys Filatov has dismissed suggestions that the group remained Ihor Kolomoyskyi's "private army". Kolomoyskyi has helped with some equipment purchases, but the force performs defence and law and order functions under the leadership of the national police.

The Russians first hit Dnipro on 11 March 2022. Three air strikes close to a kindergarten and an apartment building killed at least one person. On 15 March, Russian missiles hit Dnipro International Airport, destroying the runway and damaging the terminal. In the early hours of 6 April, an air strike destroyed an oil depot. On 10 April, a Ukrainian government spokesperson said that the airport in Dnipro had been "completely destroyed" as the result of a Russian attack. On 15 July, a Russian missile attack killed four people and injured sixteen others in Dnipro.

As part of the derussification campaign that swept through Ukraine following the February 2022 invasion 110 toponyms in the city were "de-Russified" from February to September 2022. Between April 2022 and February 2023 a total of 98 streets and alleyways were renamed. This included the renaming of a city-center avenue and street after the controversial Ukrainian nationalist and anti-Soviet partisan Stepan Bandera. In December 2022 Dnipro removed from the city all monuments to figures of Russian culture and history. (Note: Monuments to Alexander Pushkin, Maxim Gorky, Valery Chkalov, Yefim Pushkin Volodia Dubinin, Alexander Matrosov and Mikhail Lomonosov were removed from the public space of the city in December 2022.) On 22 February 2023, 26 more streets were renamed.

Dnipro was hit during the autumn 2022 Russian missile strikes on critical infrastructure. On 10 October three civilians were killed. On 18 October 2022 Russian missile strikes targeted the energy infrastructure of Dnipro. On 17 November 2022 23 people were injured. The attacks continued in 2023. The most deadly of these attacks being the 14 January 2023 missile strike on an apartment building that killed 40 people, injured 75 and with 46 people reported missing.

On 7 November 2025 the Dnipro city council introduce a moratorium on the public use of Russian language cultural products "created or reproduced in Russian"; this moratorium was set to end only after the "complete end of the occupation of the territory of Ukraine."

== Government and politics ==
=== Government ===
The City of Dnipro is governed by the Dnipro City Council. It is a city municipality that is designated as a separate district within its oblast.

Administratively, the city is divided into urban districts. Presently, there are 8 of them. Aviatorske, a rural settlement located near the Dnipro International Airport, is also a part of Dnipro urban hromada.

The City Council Assembly makes up the administration's legislative branch, thus effectively making it a city 'parliament' or rada. The municipal council is made up of 12 elected members, who are each elected to represent a certain district of the city for a four-year term. The council has 29 standing commissions which play an important role in the oversight of the city and its merchants.

Until 18 July 2020, Dnipro was incorporated as a city of oblast significance, the centre of Dnipro Municipality and extraterritorial administrative centre of Dnipro Raion. The municipality was abolished in July 2020 as part of the administrative reform of Ukraine, which reduced the number of raions of Dnipropetrovsk Oblast to seven. The area of Dnipro Municipality was merged into Dnipro Raion.

Dnipro is also the seat of the oblast's local administration controlled by the Dnipropetrovsk Oblast Rada. The Governor of Dnipropetrovsk Oblast is appointed by the President of Ukraine.

==== Subdivisions ====
Administrative districts of Dnipro

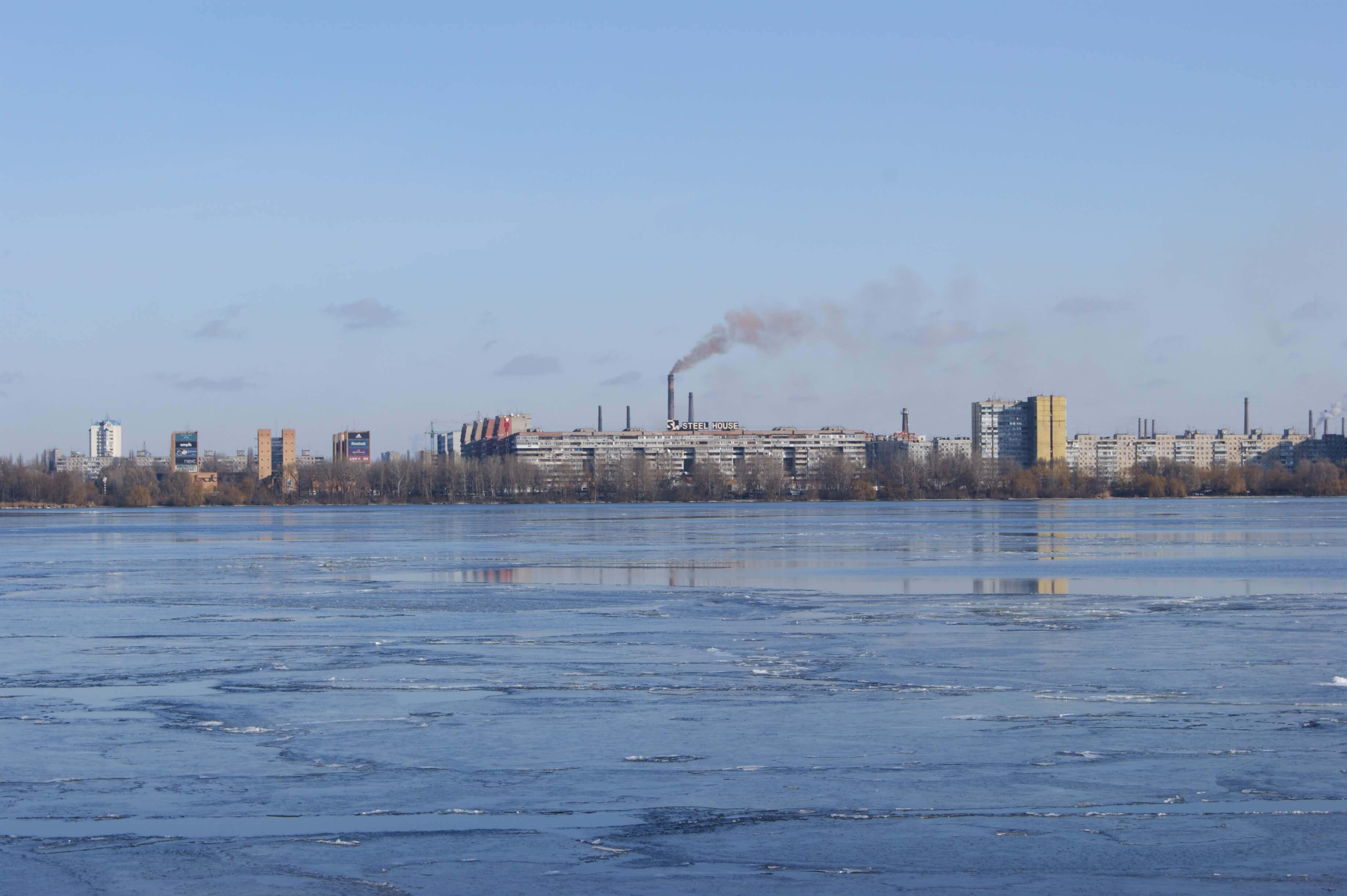
View on a part of Amur-Nyzhniodniprovskyi District

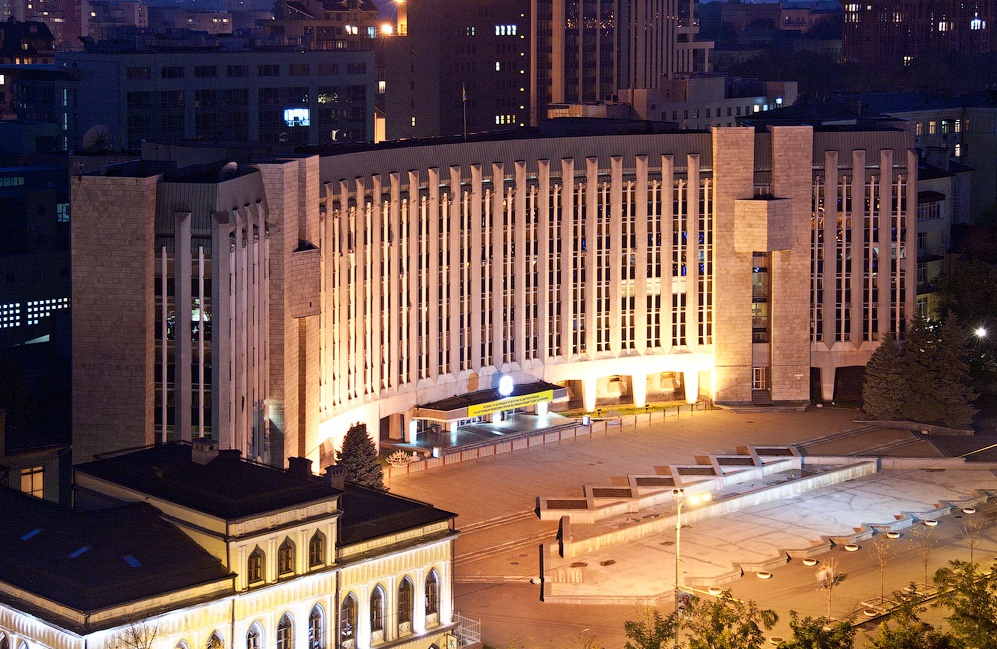
Dnipro City Hall in Shevchenkivskyi District

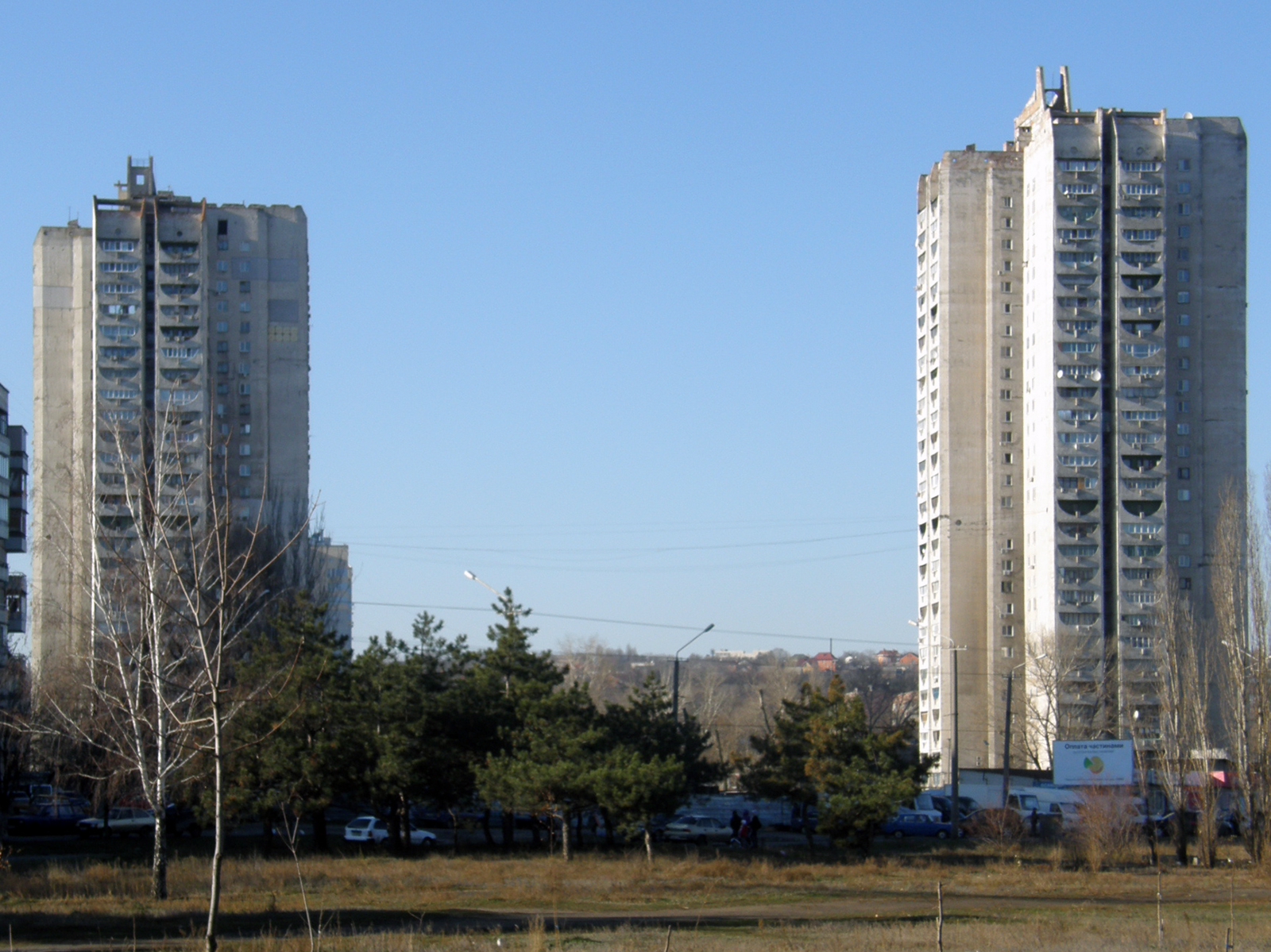
Highrise buildings in Peremoha neighbourhood, Sobornyi District

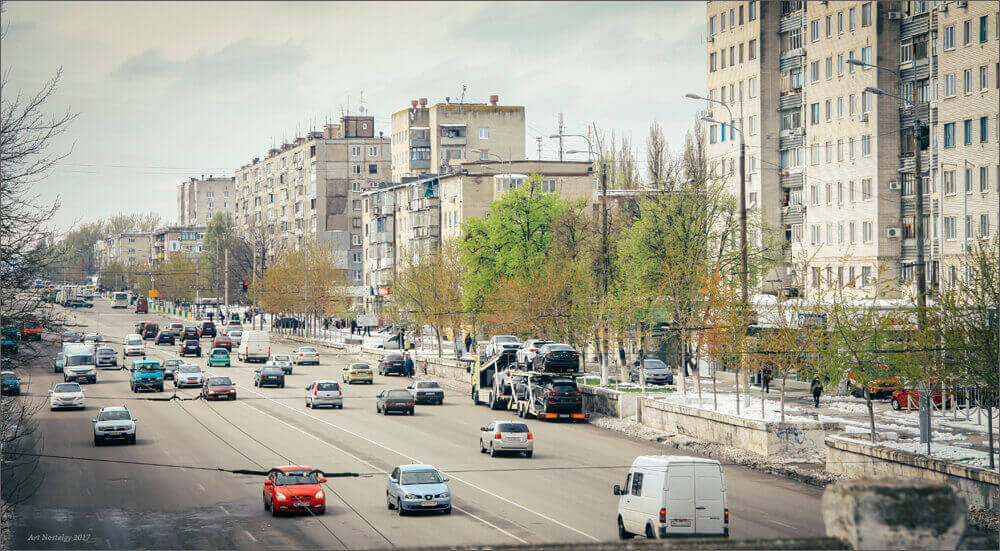
Slobozhanskyi Avenue in Industrialnyi District

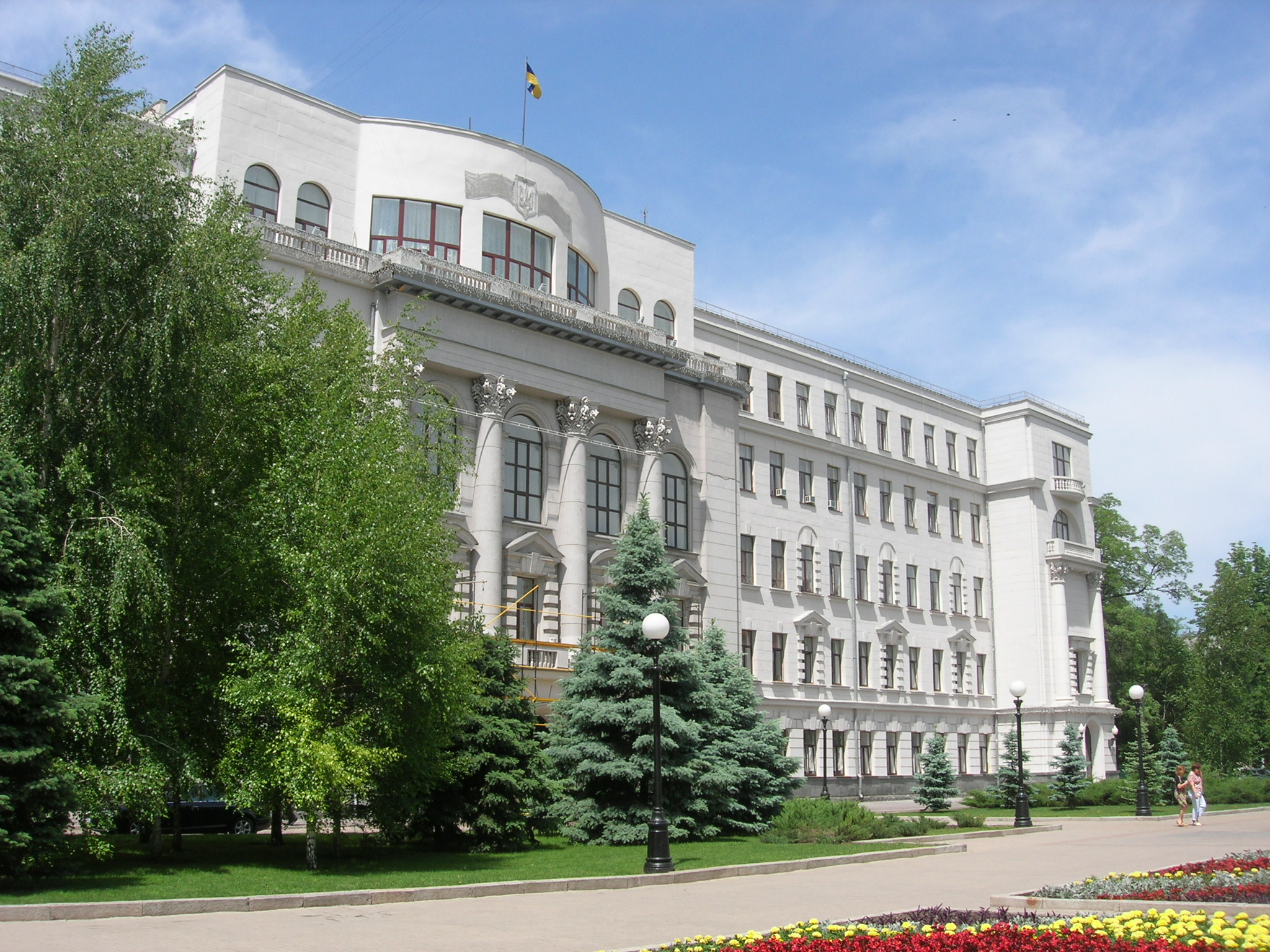
Regional Administration building in Tsentralnyi District

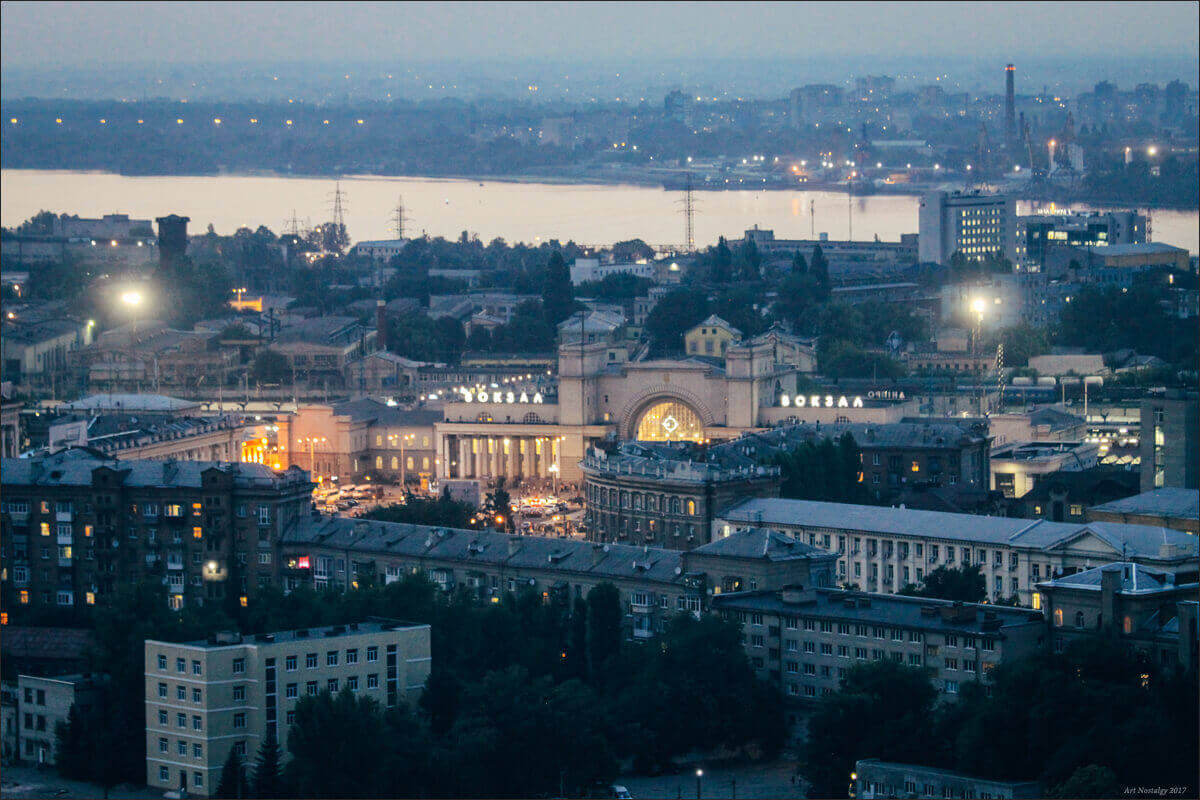
Vokzalna square, Tsentralnyi District

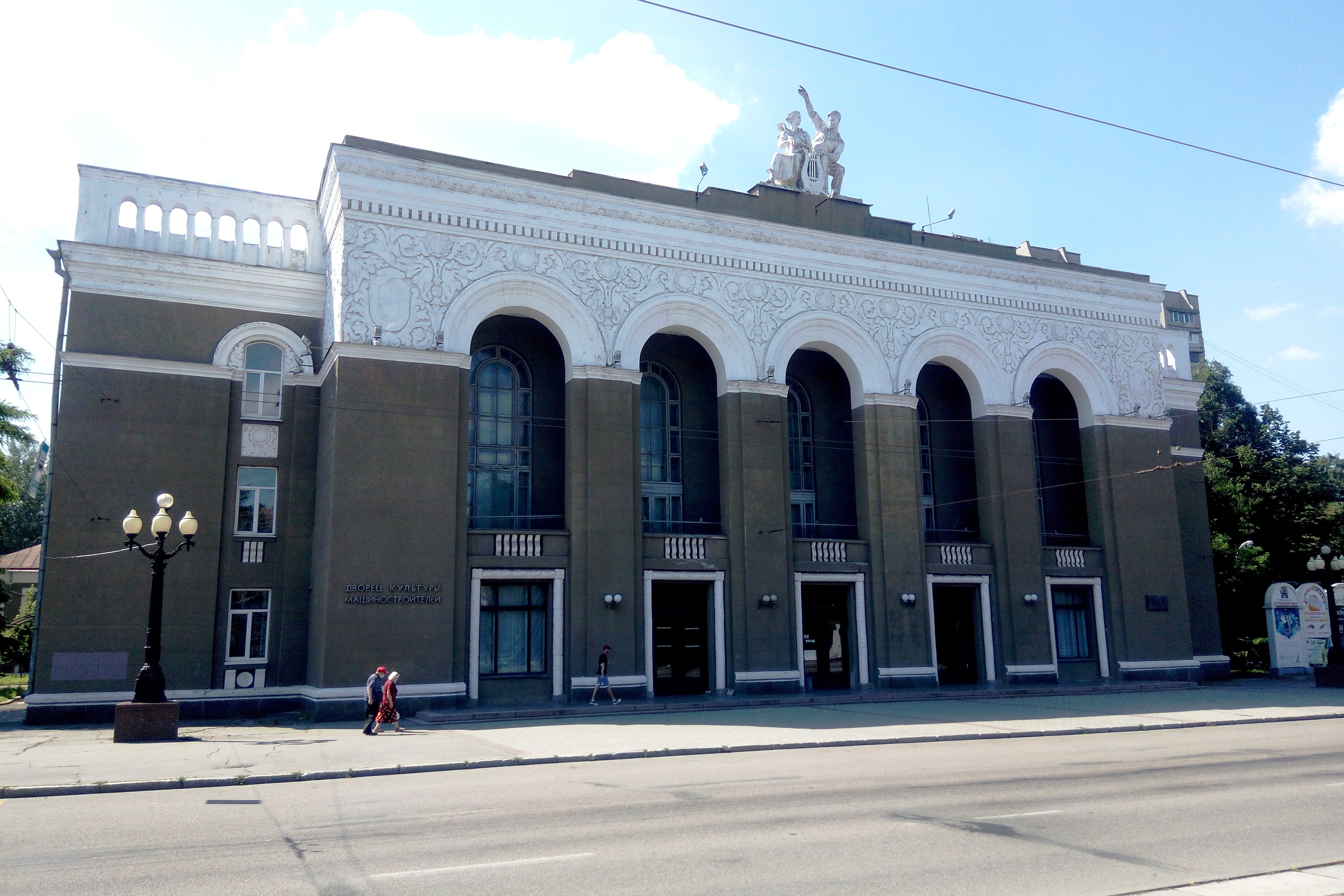
Machine-builders Palace of Culture in Chcechelivskyi District

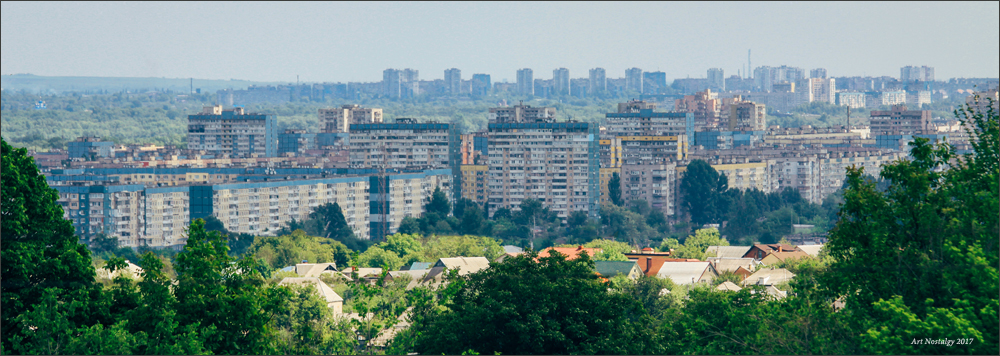
View on parts of Novokodatskyi District

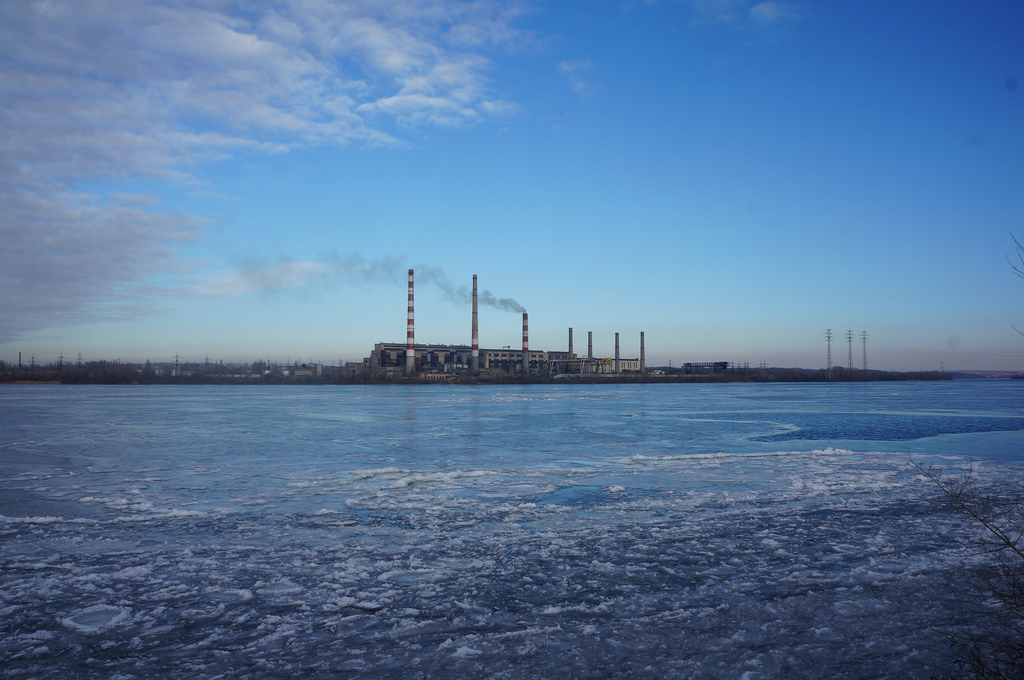
Prydniprovsk Power Plant in Samarskyi District

Code	Name of urban district	Year of creation	Area (hectares)	Population in 2006	Prominent streets and areas
1	Amur-Nyzhnodniprovskyi	1918/1926	7,162.6	154,400	Streets: Vulytsia Peredova, Prospekt Manuilyvskyi, Prospekt Slobozhanskyi, Vulytsia Kalynova, Vulytsia Vidchyznyana, Vulytsia Yantarna, Donetske Shose; Areas: Amur, Nyzhnodniprovsk, Kyrylivka, Borzhom, Sultanivka, Sakhalin, Berezanivka, Soniachnyi mikroraion, Lomivka, Livoberezhnyi mikroraion 1 and 2.
2	Shevchenkivskyi	1973	3,145.2	152,000	Streets: Prospekt Bohdana Khmelnytskoho, Vulytsia Mykhaila Hrushevskoho/Vulytsia Sichovykh Striltsiv, Akademik Yavornitskyi Prospekt, Vulytsia Sviatoslava Khorobroho, Zaporizke Shosse, Vulytsia Krotova; Areas: Tsentr, Slobodka, Razvlika-Pidstantsiya, 12th Kvartal, Topol mikroraion 1, 2 and 3, Myrnyi, Danyla Nechaia.
3	Sobornyi	1935	4,409.3	169,500	Streets: Prospekt Gagarina, Akademik Yavornitskyi Prospekt, Sicheslavska naberezhna/Peremogy, Vulytsia Volodymyra Vernadskoho, Vulytsia Hoholya, Vulytsia Chesnyshevskoho, Vulytsia Kosmichna, Vulytsia Yasnopolianska; Areas: Tsentr, Nahirny (Tabirny), Pidstantsiia, Sokil mikroraion 1 and 2, Peremoha mikroraion 1–6, Mandrykivka, Lotskamianka, Tunelna Balka, Monastyrskyi Ostriv, Kosa.
4	Industrialnyi	1969	3,267.9	132,700	Streets: Prospekt Slobozhanskyi, Prospekt Petra Kalnyshevskoho, Vulytsia Osinnia, Vulytsia Baykalska, Vulytsia Vinokurova; Areas: Klochko, Samarivka (Yozhefstal), Oleksandrivka, Livoberezhnyi mikroraion 1–3; (Nyzhnodniprovskyi Pipe Production Plant).
5	Tsentralnyi	1932	1,040.3	67,200	Streets: Vulytsia Staryi Shliakh, Akademik Yavornitskyi Prospekt, Prospekt Pushkina, Vulytsia Yaroslava Mudroho, Vulytsia Voitsekhovycha, Vulytsia Korolenko, Prospekt Bohdana Khmelnytskoho, Staromostova Square; Areas: Dniprovsky Avtovokzal, Dniprovsky Richkovy Vokzal and Dnipro River Port.
6	Chechelivskyi	1933	3,589.7	120,600	Vulytsia Robitnycha, Prospekt Nigoyana, Prospekt Pushkina, Vulytsia Kirovozhska, Vulytsia Makarova, Vulytsia Titova, Vulytsia Budivelnykiv, Prospekt Bohdana Khmelnytskoho; Areas: Chechelivka, Aptekarska Balka/Shliakhivka, 12th Kvartal, Krasnopillia, (Pivdenmash).
7	Novokodatskyi	1920	10,928	157,400	Streets: Vulytsia Naberezhna Zavodska, Prospekt Nihoiana, Prospekt Mazepy, Prospekt Metallurhiv, Vulytsia Kyivska, Vulytsia Kommunarovska, Prospekt Svobody, Vulytsia Brativ Trofimovykh, Vulytsia Mostova, Vulytsia Maiakovskoho, Vulytsia Budennoho; Areas: Toromske, Diyevka, Sukhachivka, Yasny, Novi Kaidaky, Sukhyi Ostriv, Chervonyi Kamin mikroraion, Kommunar mikroraion, Parus mikroraion 1 and 2, Zakhidnyi mikroraion, Petrovskyi Factory and other metallurgical plants.
8	Samarskyi	1977	6,683.4	77,900	Streets: Soniachna Naberezhna Street, Vulytsia Molodohvardiiska, Vulytsia Semaforna, Vulytsia Tomska, Vulytsia Kosmonavta Volkova, Vulytsia 20 rokiv Peremohy, Vulytsia Havanska; Areas: Chapli, Prydniprovsk, Ihren, Rybalske (Fischersdorf), Odinkivka, Shevchenko, Pivnichnyi mikroraion, Nyzhnodniprovsk-Vuzol.

Five of the eight urban districts were renamed late November 2015 to comply with decommunization laws.

=== Politics ===
In the first decades of Ukrainian independence the city's voters generally favoured the proponents of continued close ties to Russia: in the 1990s the Communist Party of Ukraine, and in the new century, the Party of Regions. After the 2014 events of Euromaidan, which included demonstrations and clashes in the central city, the Party of Regions ceded influence to those parties and independents calling for closer ties to the European Union.

As in Soviet Ukraine, Dnipropetrovsk was disproportionately represented among political leaders in Kyiv. The principal representatives of the so-called "Dnipropetrovsk Faction" in the capital were Ukraine's second president Leonid Kuchma and Ukraine's 10th and 13th prime minister Yulia Tymoshenko. Kuchma was a former senior manager of Yuzhmash while Tymoshenko was president of United Energy Systems of Ukraine, a Dnipropetrovsk-based private company that from 1995 to 1997 was the main importer of Russian natural gas to Ukraine.

Kuchma's 1994 presidential campaign had been financed by Dnipropetrovsk businessmen Ihor Kolomoyskyi and Gennadiy Bogolyubov. Kolomoyskyi and Bogolyubov were partners in Privat Group, a scandal-ridden financial-industrial conglomerate. As prime Minister, Kuchma had granted their PrivatBank the unique privilege of opening overseas branches. These were later implicated in the wholesale defrauding of Ukrainian depositors, leading to the bank's nationalization in 2016. Kuchma was also closely tied to another budding Dnipropetrovsk billionaire, his son-in-law Viktor Pinchuk whose assets included several giant steel and pipe plants in the region and the bank Kredit-Dnepr.

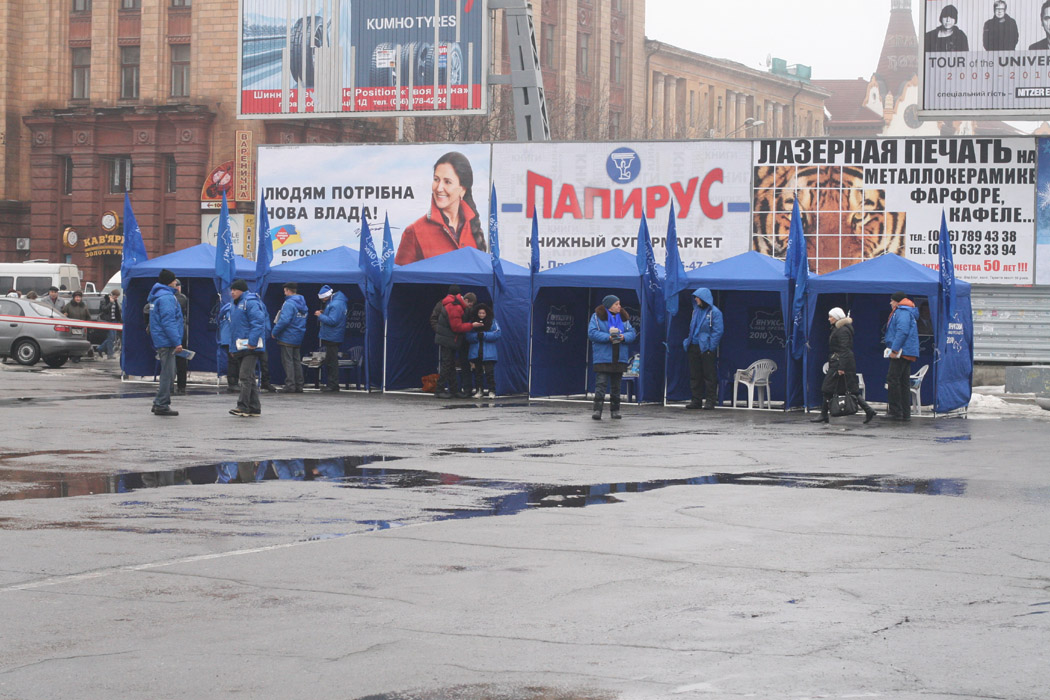
Campaign activities of the Party of Regions in central Dnipropetrovsk on 25 December 2009 during the 2010 presidential election.

With Viktor Yushchenko, Tymoshenko co-led the Orange Revolution which annulled the declared victory of Viktor Yanukovych in the 2004 presidential election, and under President Yushchenko served as prime minister from 24 January to 8 September 2005, and again from 18 December 2007 to 4 March 2010. Yanukovych narrowly defeated Tymoshenko in the 2010 presidential election, taking 41.7 per cent of the vote in the Dnipropetrovsk region. The candidates accused one another of vote rigging.

In the October 2012 Ukrainian parliamentary election Yanukovych's Party of Regions, which promoted itself as the champion of the language rights and industrial interests of largely Russian-speaking eastern Ukraine, won 35.8 per cent of the vote in the Dnipropetrovsk region, compared to 18.4 per cent for Tymoshenko's Fatherland Party and 19.4 per cent for the Communists. Tymoshenko mounted a hunger strike to once again protest election irregularities.

On 2 March 2014, following the removal of Yanukovich as President, acting President Oleksandr Turchynov appointed Ihor Kolomoyskyi Governor of Dnipropetrovsk Oblast. Kolomoyskyi initially dismissed suggestions of Russian-backed separatism in Dnipropetrovsk, but then took vigorous measures. He posted bounties for the capture of Russian-backed militants and the surrender of weapons; drafted thousands of Privat Group employees as auxiliary police officers; and is said to have provided substantial funds to create the Dnipro Battalion, and to support the Aidar, Azov, and Donbas volunteer battalions.

In the Dnipropetrovsk region, Petro Poroshenko won the May 2014 presidential election with 45 per cent, but in the 2014 parliamentary election in October his political party Petro Poroshenko Bloc secured 19.4 per cent of the vote, 5 points behind the Opposition Bloc, the successor to the disbanded Party of Regions.

On 25 March 2015, following a struggle with Kolomoyskyi for control the state-owned oil pipeline operator, President Poroshenko replaced Kolomoyskyi as governor with Valentyn Reznichenko.

In the 2015 Ukrainian local elections Borys Filatov of the patriotic UKROP was elected Mayor of Dnipro.

Result of 2020 Dnipropetrovsk Oblast Council election, with the city of Dnipro represented by numbers 1–4 on the upper right

In the March–April 2019 Ukrainian presidential election Dnipro voted overwhelmingly voted for the successful candidate, Volodymyr Zelenskyy, who advocated membership of European Union. In the parliamentary election in October, his Servant of the People party swept the board, winning each of Dnipro's five single-mandate parliamentary constituencies.

By the time of the October 2020 Ukrainian local elections, support for Zelenskyy's party had collapsed: it won just 8.7 per cent of the vote for the Dnipro City Council. The Euromaidan trajectory was represented instead by Filatov's Proposition (the "Party of Mayors"), with 60 per cent of the popular vote against 30 per cent for the pro-Russian the Opposition Platform – For Life. (Note: In the wake of the Russian invasion, in March 2022 Opposition Platform – For Life, together with a number of other smaller parties, were banned by the Ukrainian National Security Council because of alleged ties to the Government of Russia.)

== Geography ==
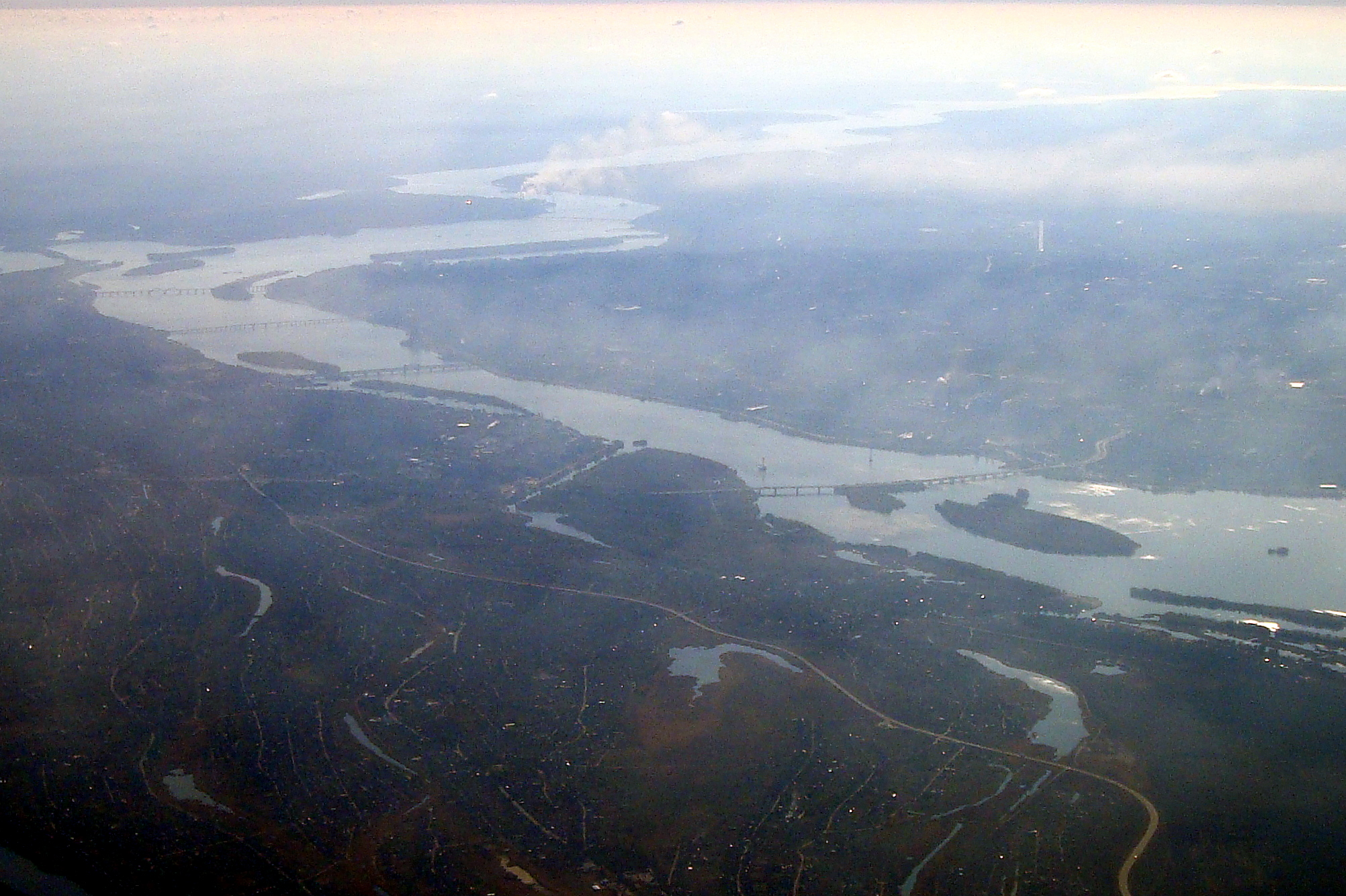
An aerial view of Dnipro. The Dnieper River, city's left and right banks, and a number of bridges can be seen.

The city is built mainly upon both banks of the Dnieper, at its confluence with the Samara River. In the loop of a major meander, the Dnieper changes its course from the north west to continue southerly and later south-westerly through Ukraine, ultimately passing Kherson, where it finally flows into the Black Sea.

Nowadays both the north and south banks play home to a range of industrial enterprises and manufacturing plants. The airport is located about 15 km (9.3 mi) south-east of the city.

The centre of the city is constructed on the right bank which is part of the Dnieper Upland, while the left bank is part of the Dnieper Lowland. The old town is situated atop a hill that is formed as a result of the river's change of course to the south. The change of river's direction is caused by its proximity to the Azov Upland located southeast of the city.

One of the city's streets, Akademik Yavornitskyi Prospekt, links the two major architectural ensembles of the city and constitutes an important thoroughfare through the centre, which along with various suburban radial road systems, provides some of the area's most vital transport links for both suburban and inter-urban travel.

=== Climate ===
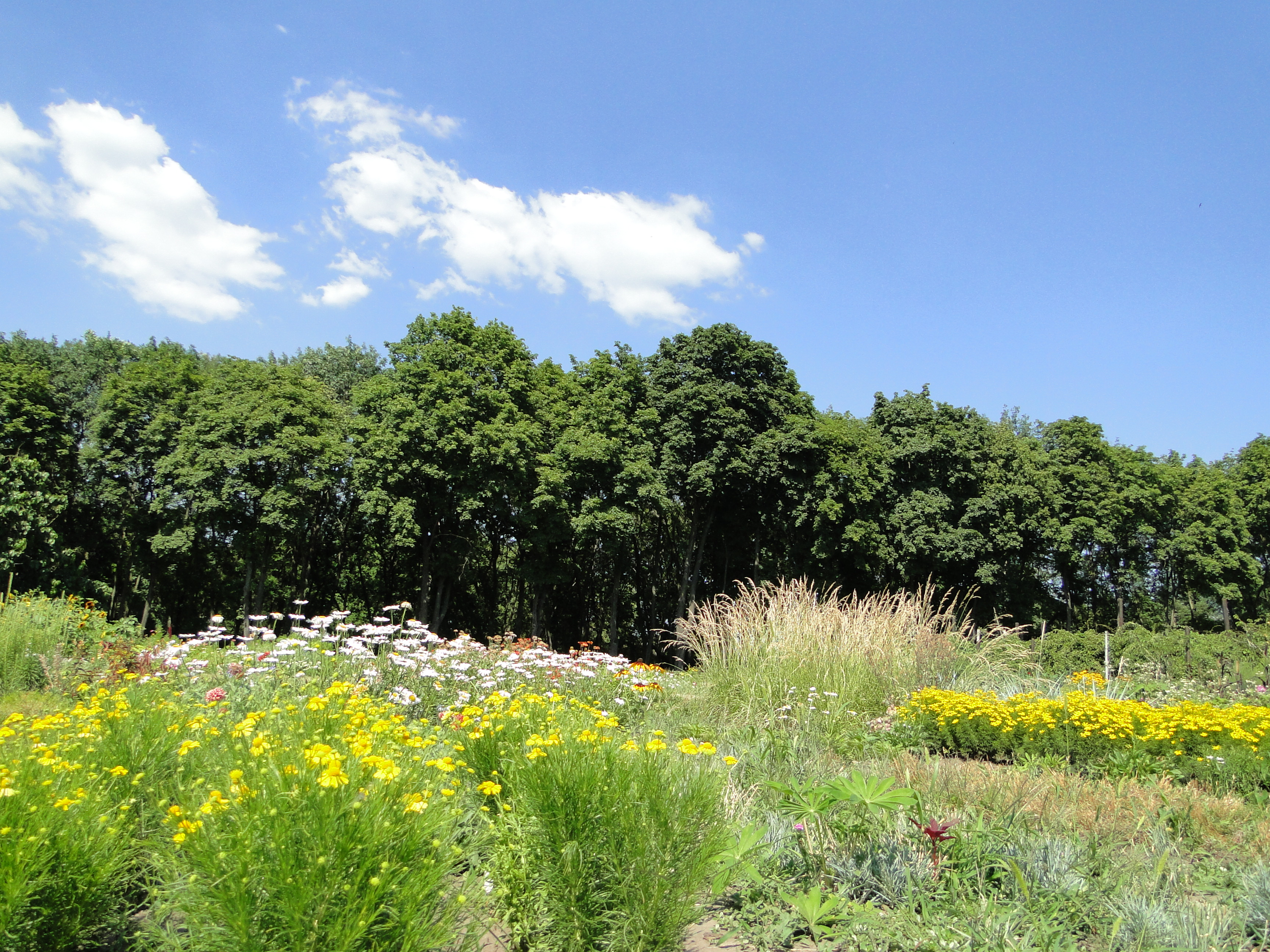
Botanical garden of the Dnipro National University during summer

Under the Köppen–Geiger climate classification system, Dnipro has a humid continental climate (Dfa). Snowfall is more common in the hills than at the city's lower elevations. The city has four distinct seasons: a cold, snowy winter; a hot summer; and two relatively wet transition periods. However, according to other schemes (such as the Salvador Rivas-Martínez bioclimatic one), Dnipro has a Supratemperate bioclimate, and belongs to the Temperate xeric steppic thermoclimatic belt, due to high evapotranspiration.

During the summer, Dnipro is very warm (average day temperature in July is 24 to 28 °C (75 to 82 °F), even hot sometimes 32 to 36 °C (90 to 97 °F)). Temperatures as high as 36 °C (97 °F) have been recorded in May. Winter is not so cold (average day temperature in January is −4 to 0 °C (25 to 32 °F), but when there is no snow and the wind blows hard, it feels extremely cold. A mix of snow and rain happens usually in December.

The best time for visiting the city is in late spring (late April and May), and early in autumn: September, October, when the city's trees turn yellow. Other times are mainly dry with a few showers.

"However, the city is characterized with significant pollution of air with industrial emissions." The "severely polluted air and water" and allegedly "vast areas of decimated landscape" of Dnipro and Donetsk are considered by some to be an environmental crisis. Though exactly where in Dnipropetrovsk these areas might be found is not stated.

Climate data for Dnipro (1991–2020, extremes 1948–present)
Month	Jan	Feb	Mar	Apr	May	Jun	Jul	Aug	Sep	Oct	Nov	Dec	Year
Record high °C (°F)	12.3 (54.1)	17.5 (63.5)	24.1 (75.4)	31.8 (89.2)	36.1 (97.0)	37.8 (100.0)	39.8 (103.6)	40.9 (105.6)	36.5 (97.7)	32.6 (90.7)	20.6 (69.1)	13.7 (56.7)	40.9 (105.6)
Mean daily maximum °C (°F)	−0.9 (30.4)	0.6 (33.1)	7.1 (44.8)	16.0 (60.8)	22.7 (72.9)	26.6 (79.9)	29.1 (84.4)	28.7 (83.7)	22.4 (72.3)	14.4 (57.9)	5.8 (42.4)	0.6 (33.1)	14.4 (57.9)
Daily mean °C (°F)	−3.6 (25.5)	−2.8 (27.0)	2.5 (36.5)	10.3 (50.5)	16.5 (61.7)	20.5 (68.9)	22.7 (72.9)	22.1 (71.8)	16.2 (61.2)	9.2 (48.6)	2.6 (36.7)	−1.9 (28.6)	9.5 (49.1)
Mean daily minimum °C (°F)	−6.1 (21.0)	−5.8 (21.6)	−1.2 (29.8)	5.1 (41.2)	10.9 (51.6)	15.1 (59.2)	17.1 (62.8)	16.3 (61.3)	11.0 (51.8)	5.2 (41.4)	−0.1 (31.8)	−4.2 (24.4)	5.3 (41.5)
Record low °C (°F)	−30.0 (−22.0)	−27.8 (−18.0)	−19.2 (−2.6)	−8.2 (17.2)	−2.4 (27.7)	3.9 (39.0)	5.9 (42.6)	3.9 (39.0)	−3.0 (26.6)	−8.0 (17.6)	−17.9 (−0.2)	−27.8 (−18.0)	−30.0 (−22.0)
Average precipitation mm (inches)	50 (2.0)	43 (1.7)	51 (2.0)	39 (1.5)	51 (2.0)	64 (2.5)	55 (2.2)	45 (1.8)	42 (1.7)	39 (1.5)	44 (1.7)	46 (1.8)	569 (22.4)
Average extreme snow depth cm (inches)	7 (2.8)	10 (3.9)	5 (2.0)	0 (0)	0 (0)	0 (0)	0 (0)	0 (0)	0 (0)	0 (0)	1 (0.4)	4 (1.6)	10 (3.9)
Average rainy days	9	8	11	13	13	13	12	9	10	11	12	11	132
Average snowy days	16	15	9	1	0	0	0	0	0	1	7	15	64
Average relative humidity (%)	88.5	84.7	77.2	64.6	63.2	64.8	63.6	60.5	67.3	77.1	85.5	88.8	73.8
Mean monthly sunshine hours	50	74	132	196	266	281	310	285	211	142	62	37	2,046
Source 1: Pogoda.ru.net
Source 2: NOAA (humidity and sun 1991–2020)

=== Cityscape ===
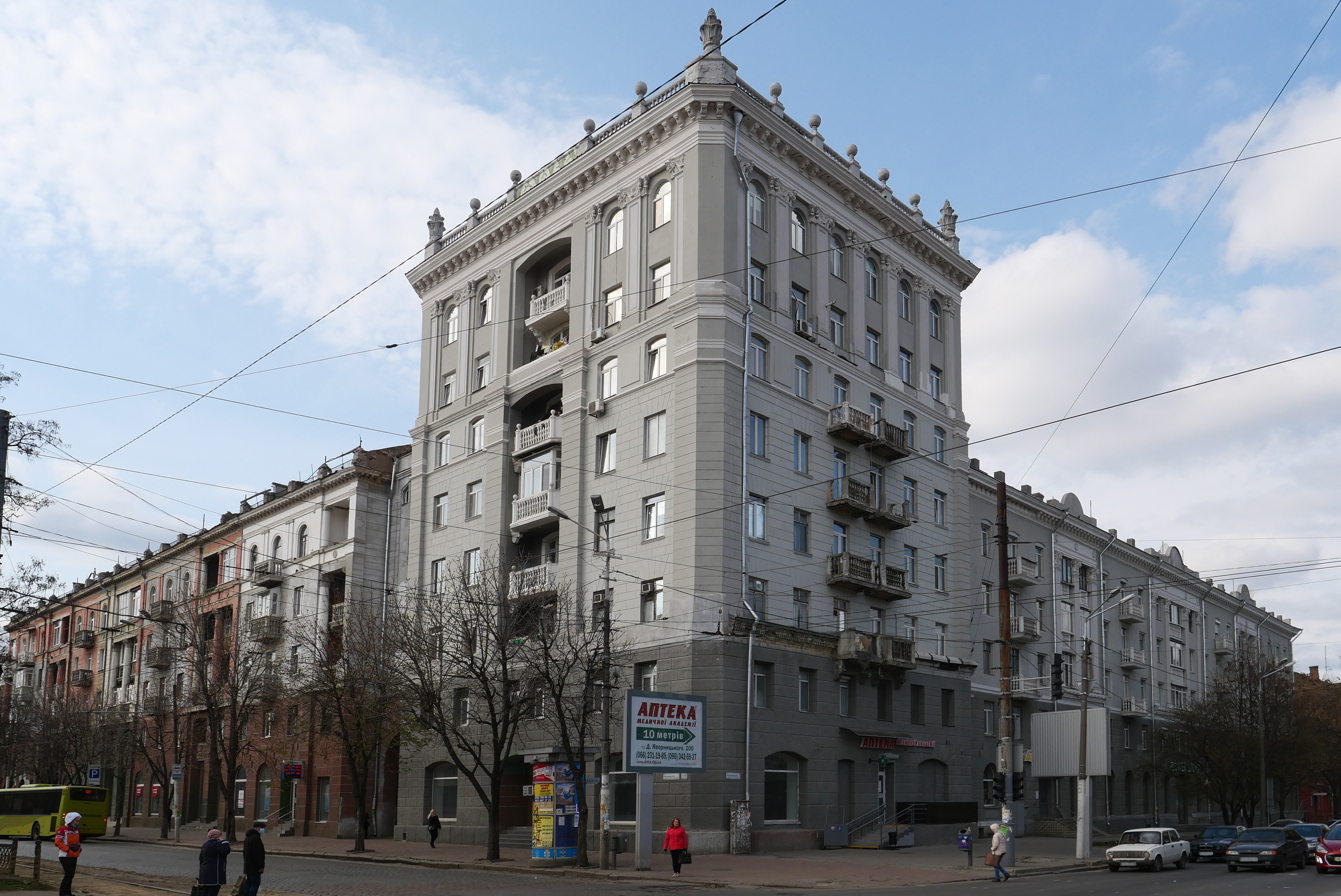
Stalinist architecture on the Dmytro Yavornytsky Avenue

Dnipro is a primarily industrial city of around one million people. It has developed into a large urban centre over the past few centuries to become, today, Ukraine's fourth-largest city after Kyiv, Kharkiv and Odesa. Stalinist architecture (monumental soviet classicism) dominates in the city centre.

Immediately after its foundation Yekaterinoslav, began to develop exclusively on the right bank of the Dnieper River. At first the city developed radially from the central point provided by the Transfiguration Cathedral, completed in 1835. Neoclassical structures of brick and stone construction were preferred and the city began to take on the appearance of a typical European city of the era. Many of these buildings have been retained in the city's older Sobornyi District. Among the most important buildings of this era are the Transfiguration Cathedral, and a number of buildings in the area surrounding Akademik Yavornitskyi Prospekt, including the Khrennikov House.

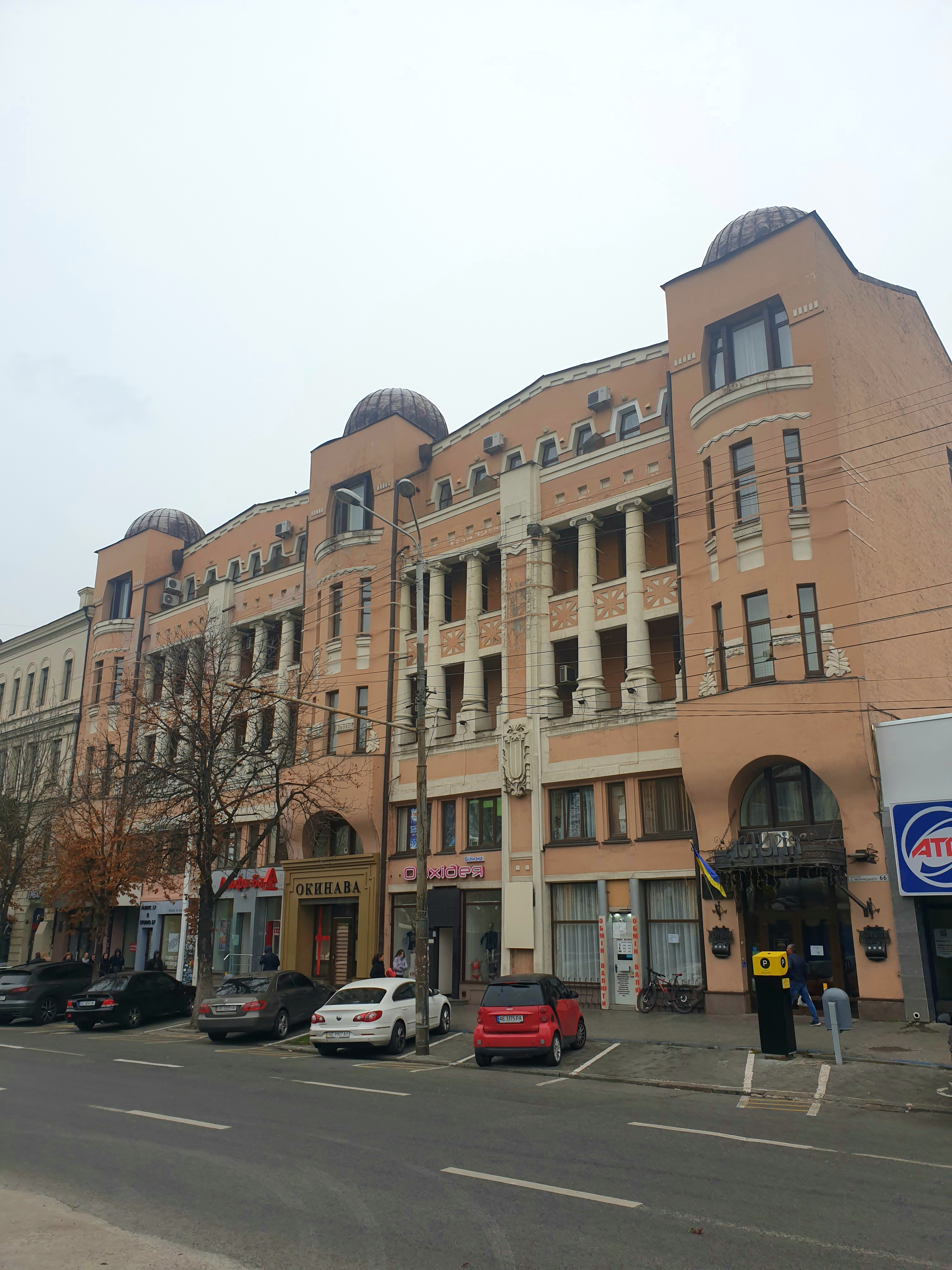
Astoria Hotel

Over the next few decades, until the final end of the Russian Empire with the October Revolution in 1917, the city did not change much in appearance. The predominant architectural style remained neo-classicism. Notable buildings built in the era before 1917 include the main building of the Dnipro Polytechnic, which was built in 1899–1901, the art-nouveau inspired building of the city's former Duma (parliament), the Dnipropetrovsk National Historical Museum, and the Mechnikov Regional Hospital. Other buildings of the era that did not fit the typical architectural style of the time in Dnipropetrovsk include, the Ukrainian-influenced Grand Hotel Ukraine, the Russian revivalist style railway station (since reconstructed), and the art-nouveau Astoriya building on Akademik Yavornitskyi Prospekt.

Once Yekaterinoslav became part of the Soviet Union (officially in 1922), and became Dnipropetrovsk in 1926, the city was gradually purged of tsarist-era monuments. Monumental architecture was stripped of Imperial coats of arms and other non-socialist symbolism. Following the 1917 October Revolution, a monument to Catherine the Great that stood in front of the Mining Institute was replaced with one of Russian academic Mikhail Lomonosov.

Later, due to damage from World War II, badly damaged buildings were, more often than not, demolished completely and replaced with new structures. In the early 1950s, during the ongoing industrialisation of the city, much of Dnipropetrovsk's centre was rebuilt in the Stalinist style of Socialist Realism. This is one of the main reasons why much of Dnipro's central avenue, Akademik Yavornitskyi Prospekt (formerly Karl Marx Prospect), is designed in the style of Stalinist Social Realism. A number of large buildings were reconstructed. The main railway station, for example, was stripped of its Russian-revival ornamentation and redesigned in the style of Stalinist social-realism.

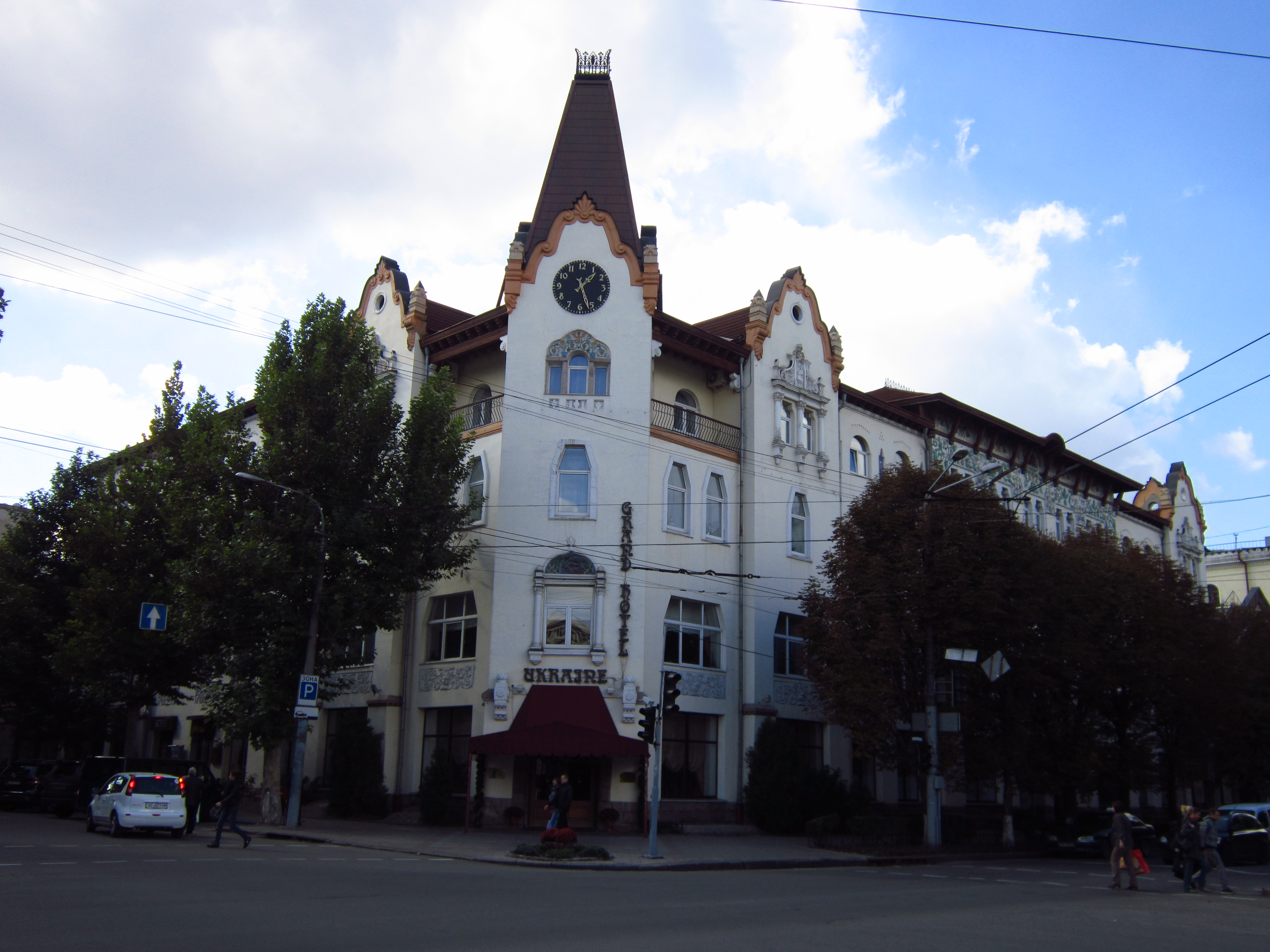
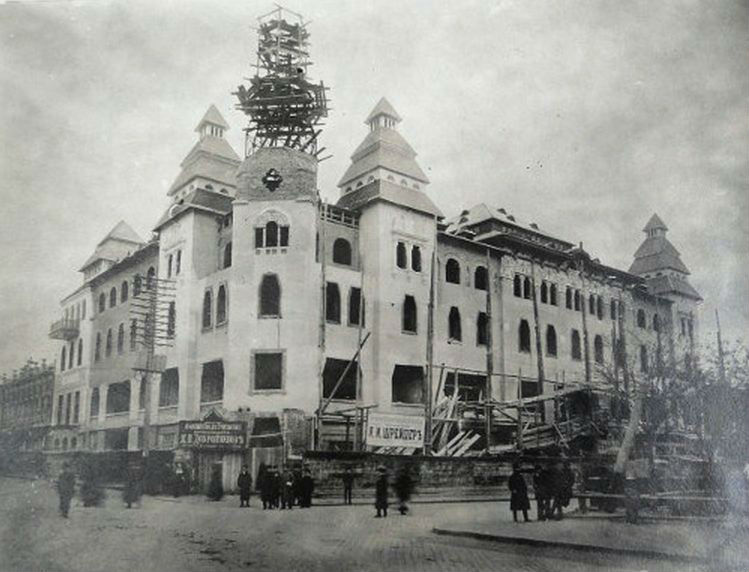
Grand Hotel Ukraine in 2013 and in 1913.

The Grand Hotel Ukraine survived the war but was later simplified much in design, with its roof being reconstructed in a typical French mansard style as opposed to the ornamental Ukrainian Baroque of the pre-war era. Many pre-revolution buildings were reconstructed to suit new purposes. For example, the Emperor Nicholas II Commercial Institute in the city was reconstructed to serve as the administrative centre for the Dnipropetrovsk Oblast, a function it fulfils to this day. Other buildings, such as the Potemkin Palace were given over to "the proletariat" (the working man), in this case as the students' union of the Oles Honchar Dnipro National University.

After the death of Joseph Stalin in 1953 and the appointment of Nikita Khrushchev as General Secretary of the Communist Party of the Soviet Union, the industrialisation of Dnipropetrovsk became even more profound, with the Southern (Yuzhne) Missile and Rocket factory being set up in the city. However, this was not the only development and many other factories, especially metallurgical and heavy-manufacturing plants, were set up in the city.

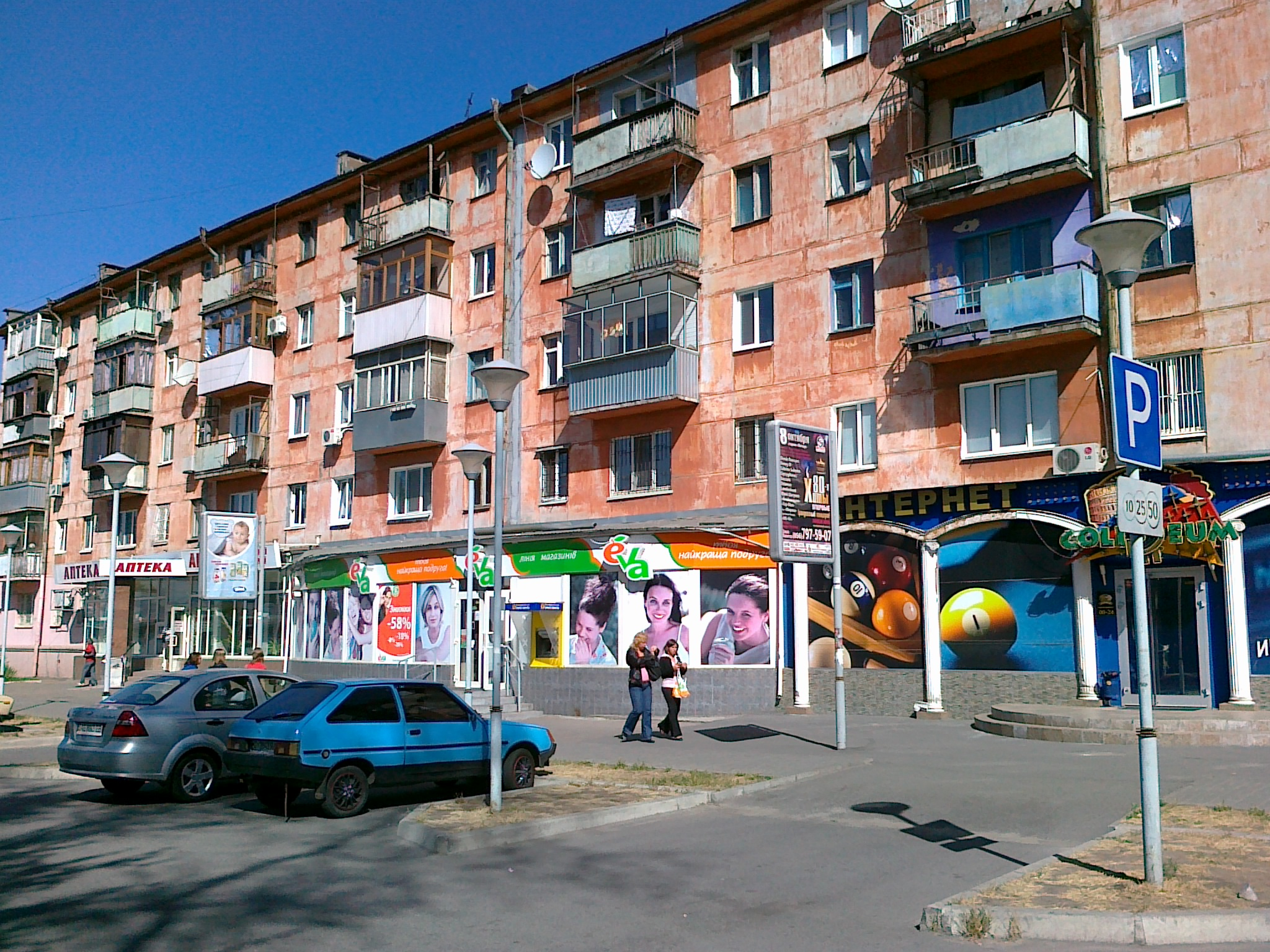
Khrushchyovkas on Science Avenue (formerly Gagarin Avenue)

As a result of all this industrialisation the city's inner suburbs became increasingly polluted and were gradually given over to large, industrial enterprises. At the same time the extensive development of the city's left bank and western suburbs as new residential areas began. The low-rise tenant houses of the Khrushchev era (Khrushchyovkas) gave way to the construction of high-rise prefabricated apartment blocks (similar to German Plattenbaus). In 1976, in line with the city's 1926 renaming, a large monumental statue of Grigoriy Petrovsky was placed on the square in front of the city's railway station.

Since the independence of Ukraine in 1991 and the economic development that followed, a number of large commercial and business centres have been built in the city's outskirts. To this day the city is characterised by its mix of architectural styles, with much of the city's centre consisting of pre-revolutionary buildings in a variety of styles, stalinist buildings and constructivist architecture, while residential districts are, more often than not, made up of aesthetically simple, technically outdated mid-rise and high-rise housing stock from the Soviet era. Despite this, the city has a large number of 'private sectors' where the tradition of building and maintaining individual detached housing has continued to this day.

The local statue of Lenin was toppled by protesters in February 2014 the day after Ukraine's president Viktor Yanukovych fled to Russia following months of protests against him. The square were the statue had stood for some 50 years was soon renamed from "Lenin Square" to "Heroes of Maidan Square".

In late November 2015 about 300 streets, 5 of the 8 city districts and one metro station were renamed to comply with decommunization laws.

The 1976 Petrovsky statue was destroyed by an angry mob on 29 January 2016.

As part of the derussification campaign that swept through Ukraine following the February 2022 Russian invasion of Ukraine, 110 toponyms in the city were renamed from February to September 2022. On 3 May 2022 alone more than a dozen memorials erected during Soviet times were dismantled. In December 2022 the Dnipro communal services (in accordance a decision of the Dnipro City Council) removed from the city all monuments to figures of Russian culture and history. This meant that monuments to Alexander Pushkin, Alexander Matrosov, Volodia Dubinin, Maxim Gorky, Valery Chkalov, Yefim Pushkin and Mikhail Lomonosov were removed from the public space of the city. On 16 November 2022 Pushkin Avenue in Dnipro had been renamed Lesya Ukrainka Avenue. In January 2023 a T-34 tank on Akademik Yavornitskyi Prospekt that served as a monument to Hero of the Soviet Union Yefim Pushkin was removed after the Dnipro City Council had decided the monument "has no historical or artistic value." (Note: This monument of Yefim Pushkin was erected 1967 and was intended to symbolize the liberation of Dnipro from the Nazis by the Soviet army. On 5 January 2023, the day after the monument was dismantled, Mayor of Dnipro Borys Filatov claimed that Yefim Pushkin "defended our city when the Soviet command was incompetent, in just a few days, surrendering a huge industrial centre to the advancing Nazis." Filatov also claimed that the T-34 tank of the monument was of a modification of 1967 and so could have never been driven by Pushkin.) 26 more streets were renamed in Dnipro on 22 February 2023. In December 2023 the renaming of streets continued with on 20 December 2023 again 53 city toponyms their names being changed by the Dnipro City Council. Also on this day the Dnipro City Council renamed a part of Dnipro's central avenue, Akademik Yavornitskyi Prospekt, in honor of commander of the 1st Mechanized Battalion of the Armed Forces of Ukraine and Hero of Ukraine Dmytro Kotsiubailo (who had perished on 7 March 2023 in battle near Bakhmut). On 31 January 2024 92 other toponyms were renamed by the Dnipro City Council, including the avenue named after (Soviet cosmonaut and first human in space) Yuri Gagarin.

A monument to Soviet Airborne Forces general Vasily Margelov that was installed in Dnipro (his place of birth) in the year 2000 was dismantled on 15 August 2026. It was reported that in its place a monument to Ukrainian paratroopers would be placed.

Architecture and historically significant sites and monuments in Dnipro

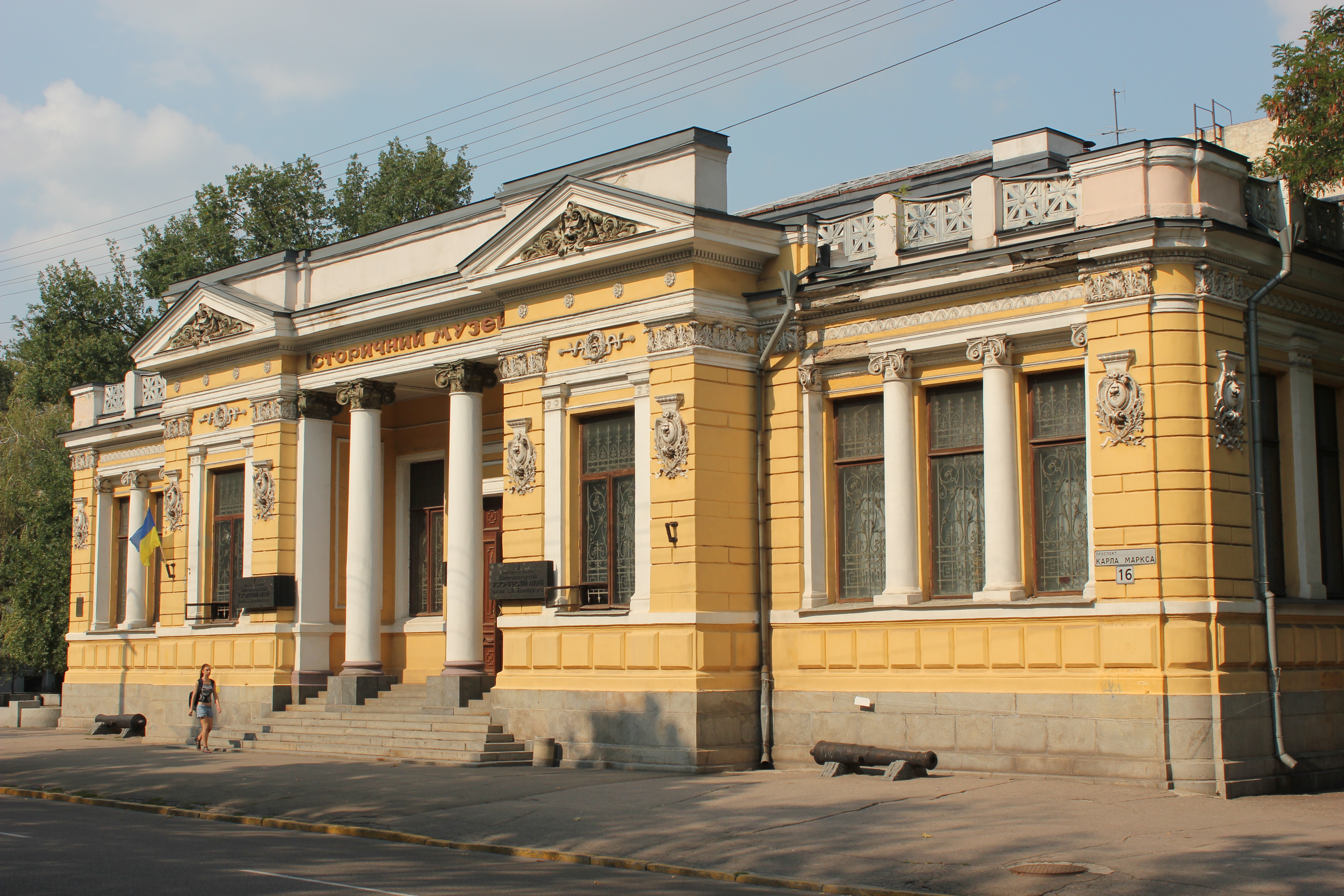
The Yavornytsky Historical Museum

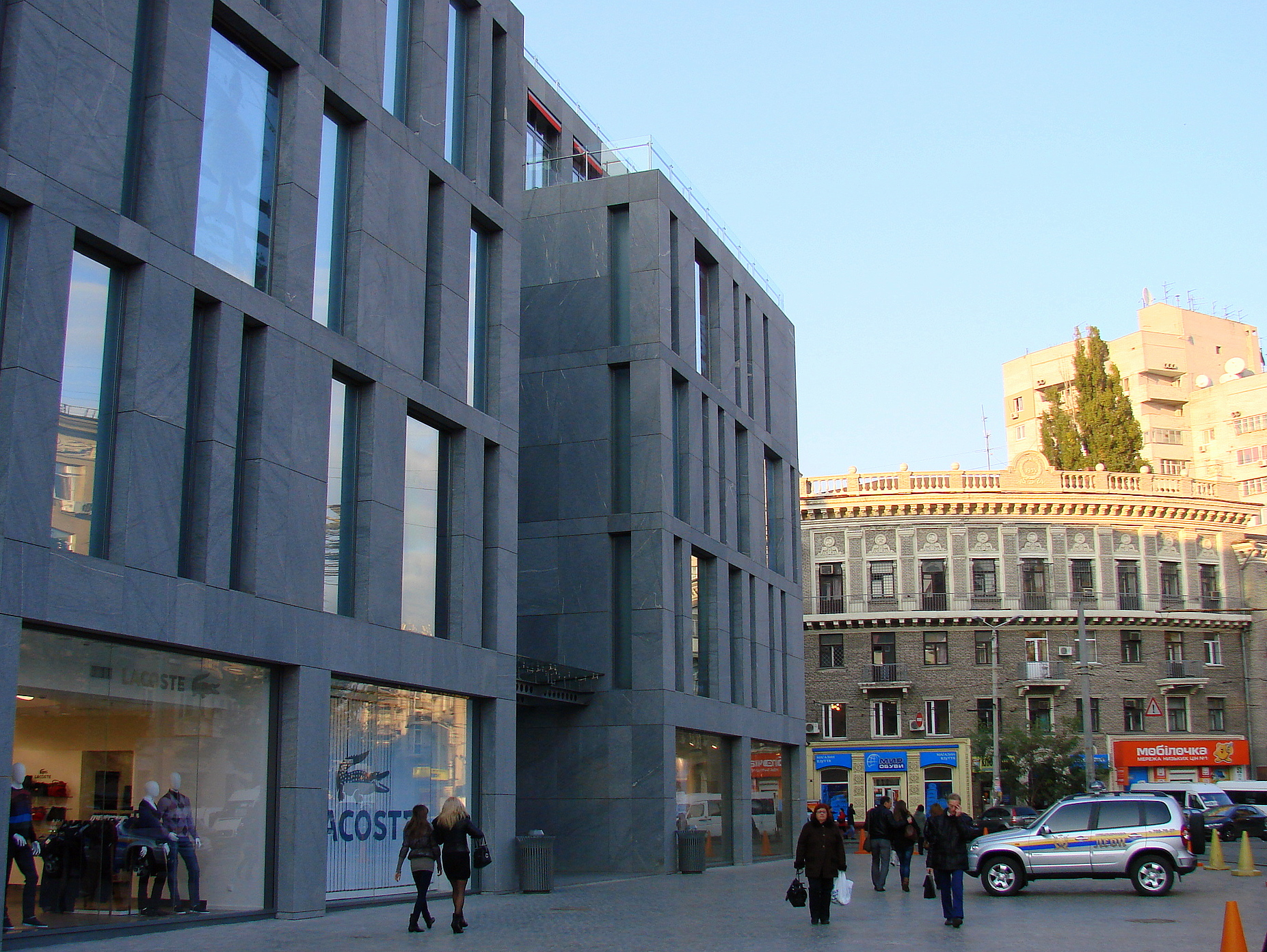
Stalinist architecture blends with the post-modernism of Dnipro's 'Passage' shopping and entertainment centre

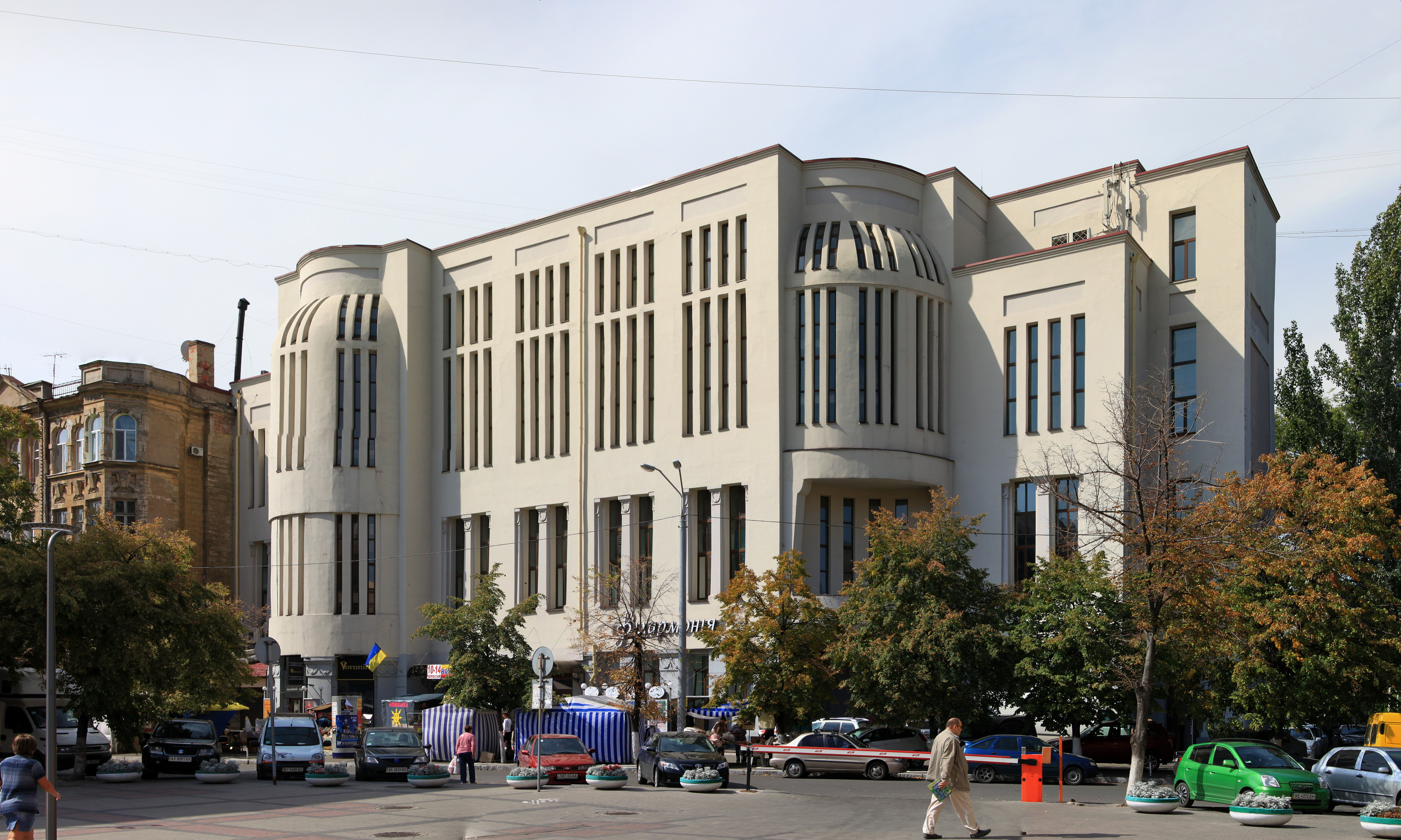
The Dnipro Philharmonic

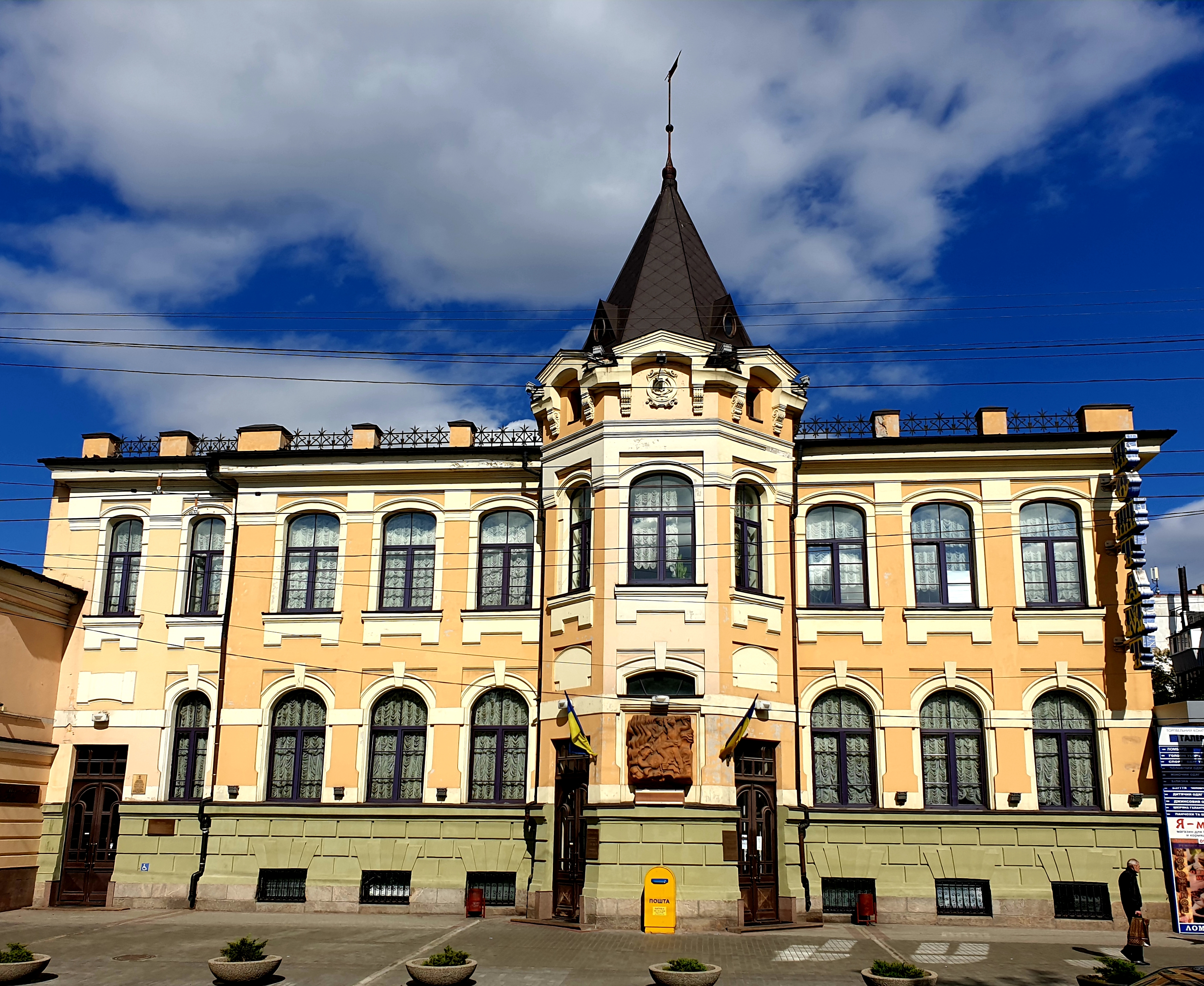
Main post office

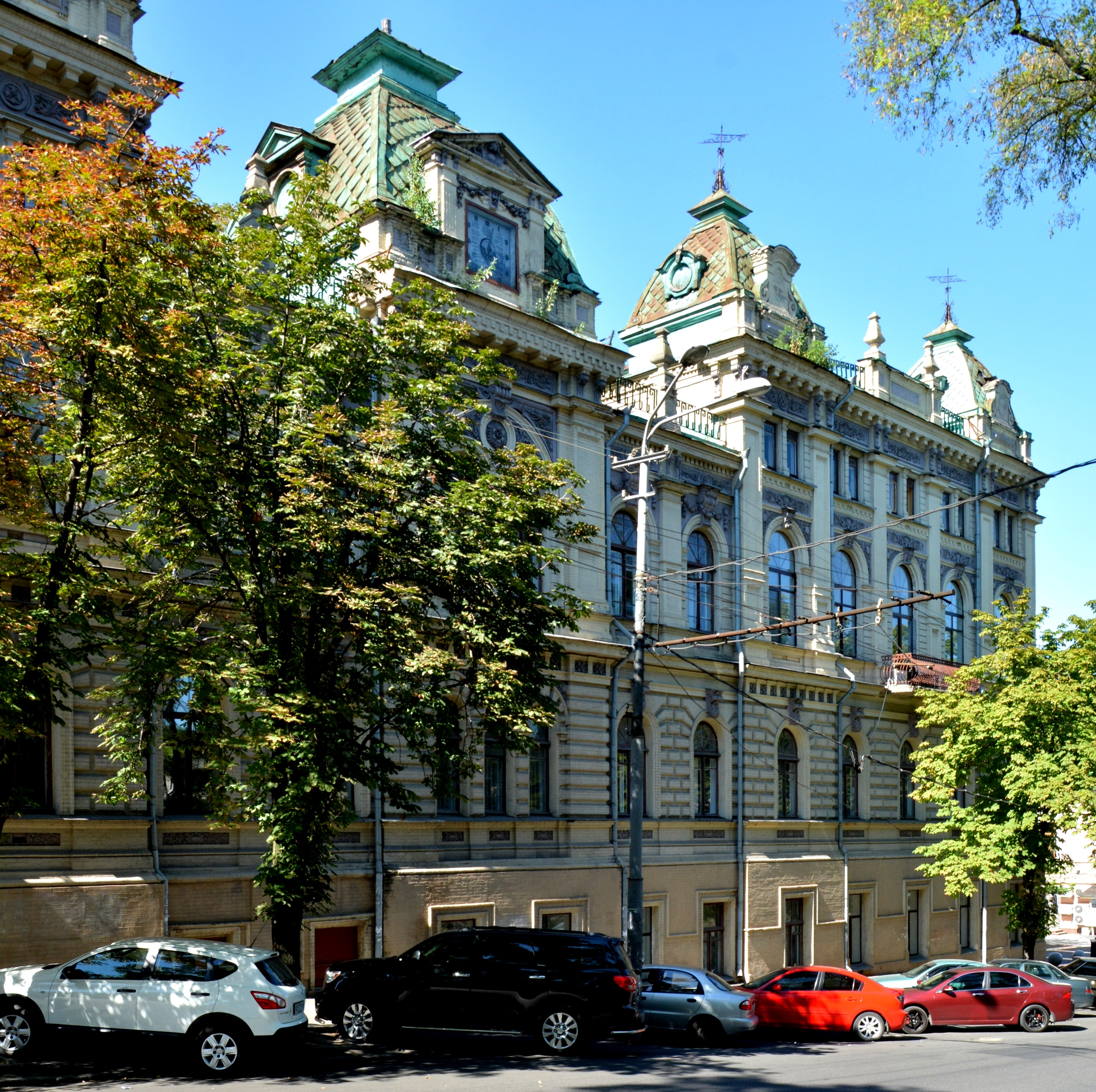
Historic city government building from imperial times

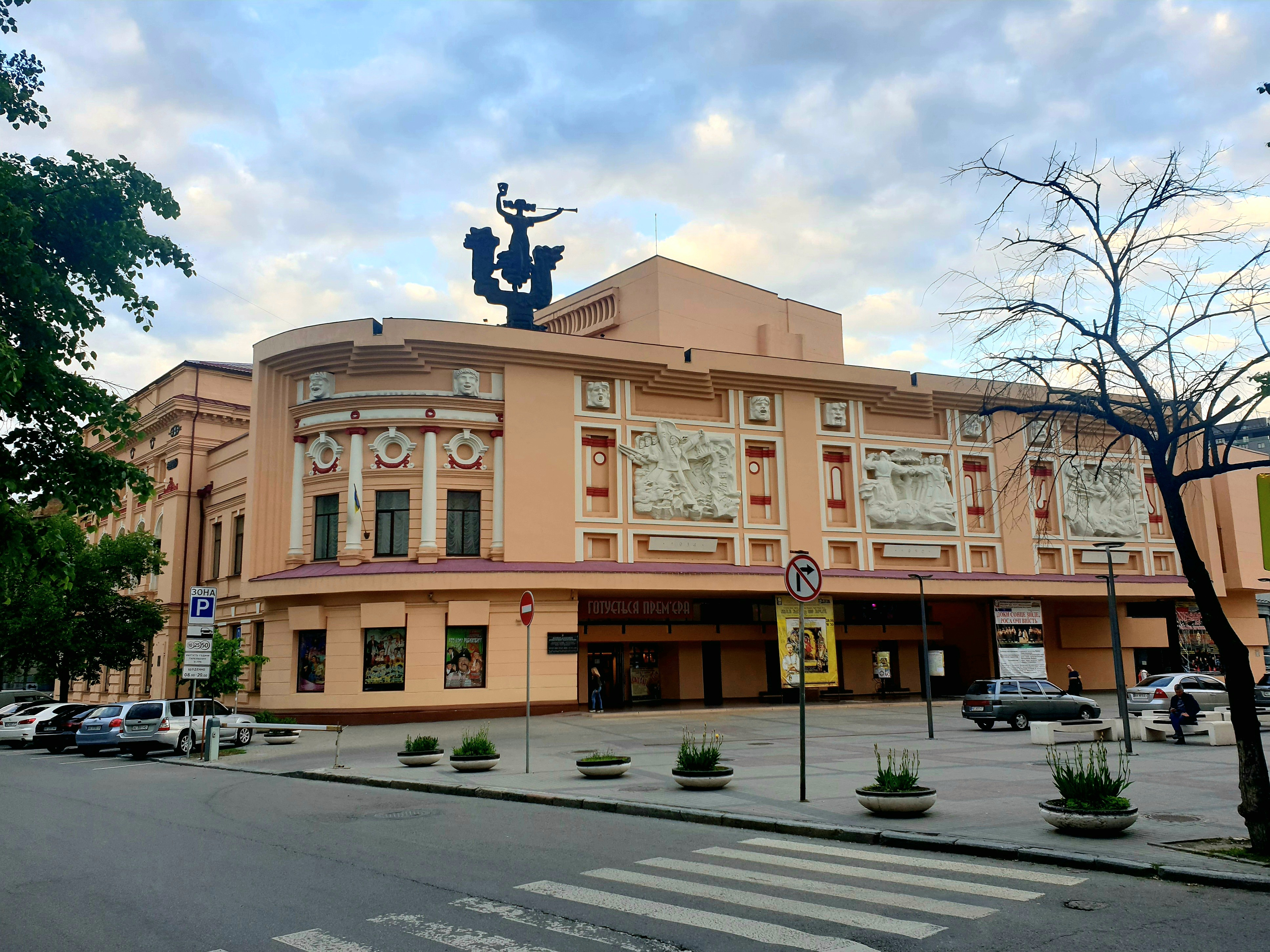
Taras Shevchenko Dnipro Academic Ukrainian Music and Drama Theatre

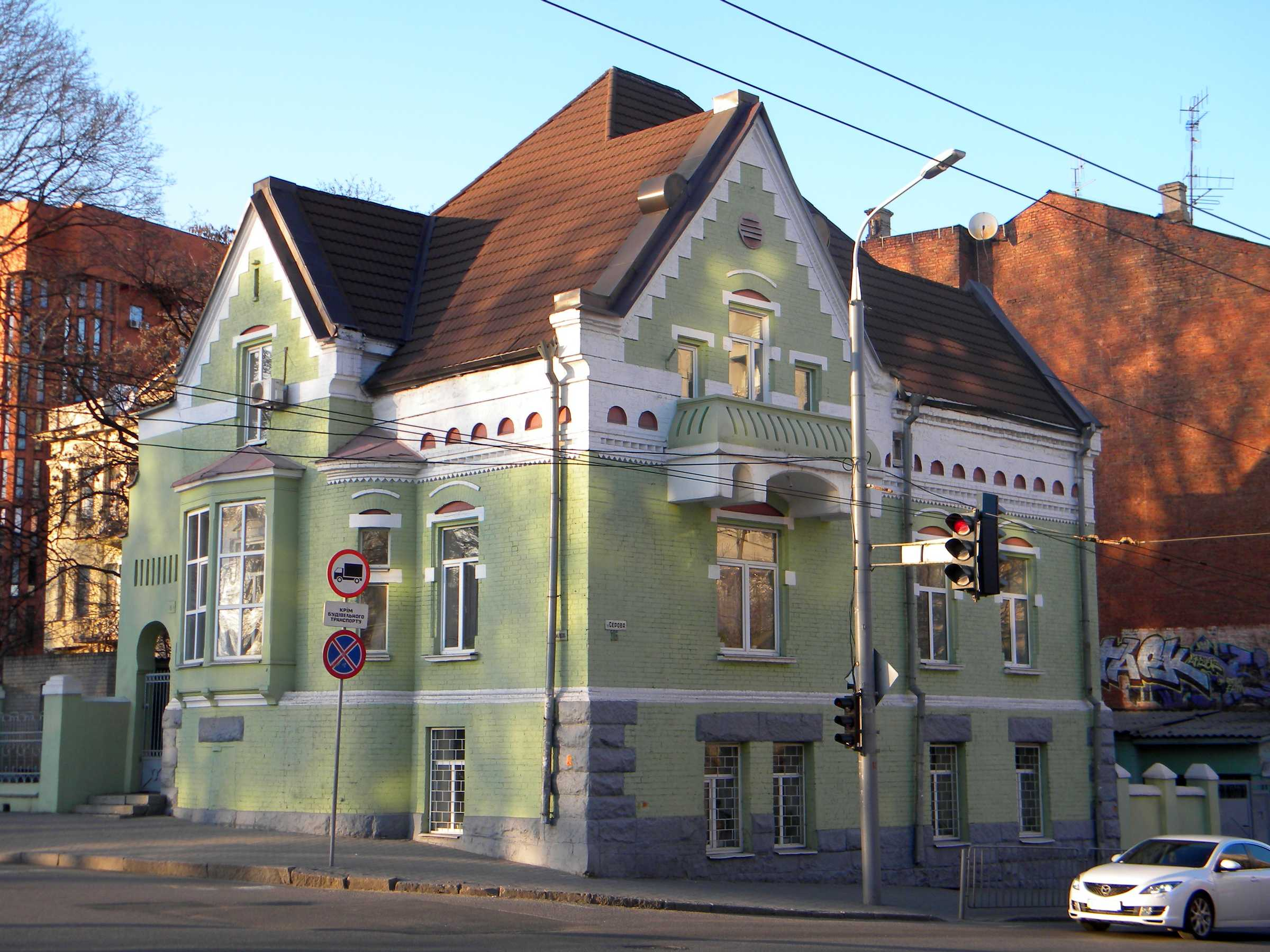
Historical revenue house

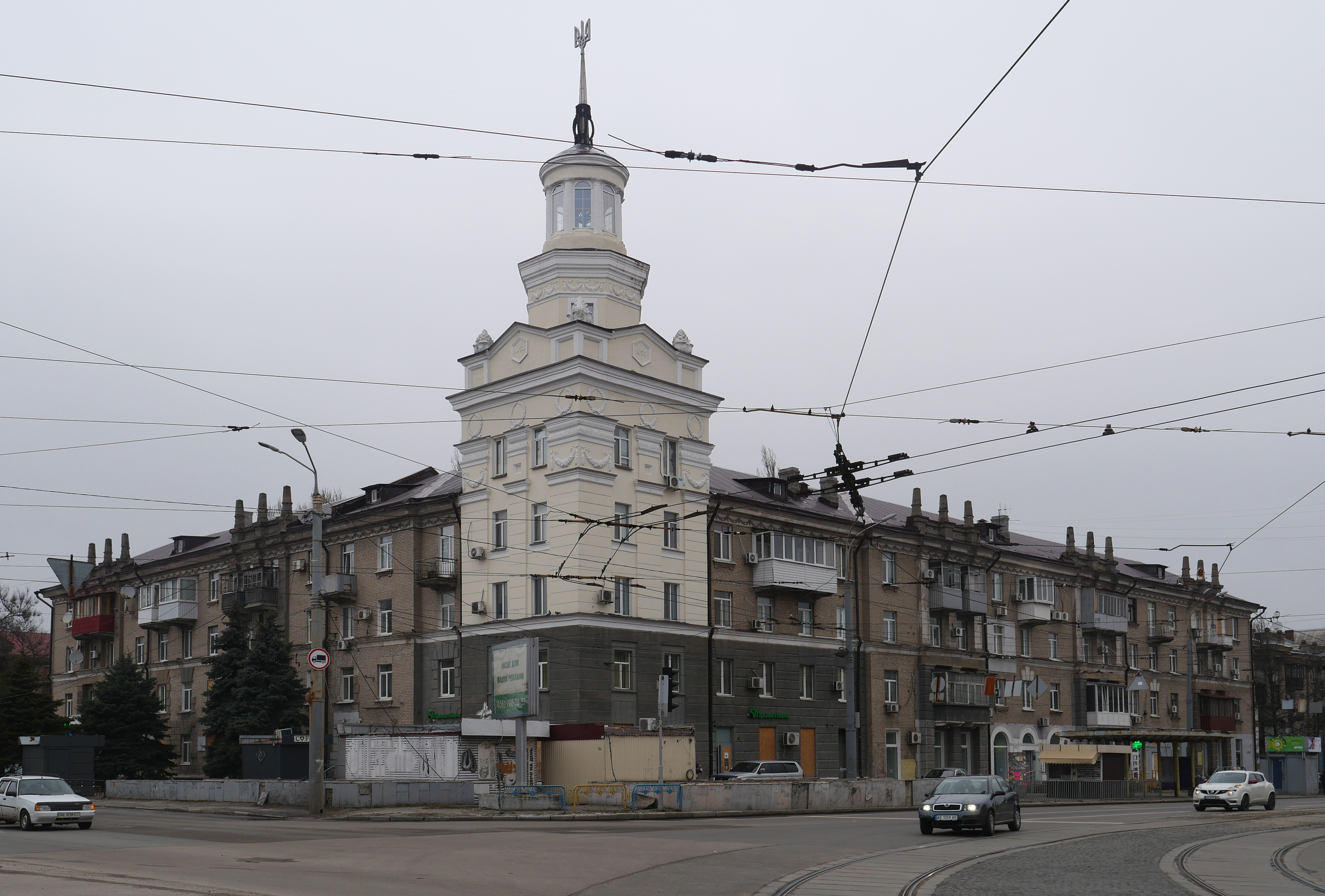
Stalinist residential building in Robocha street

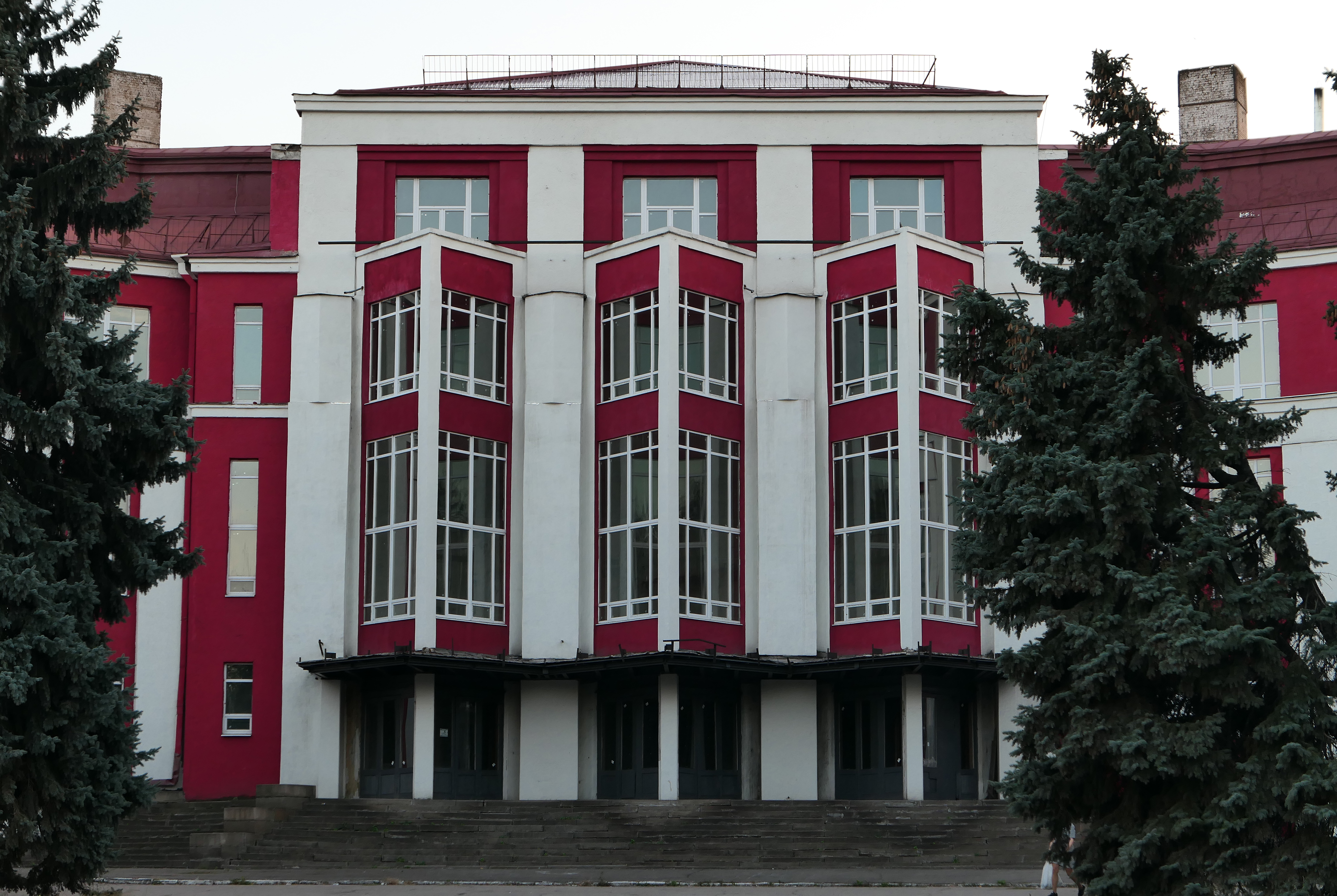
Constructivist Palace of Labour in Nigoyan Avenue after recent reconstruction
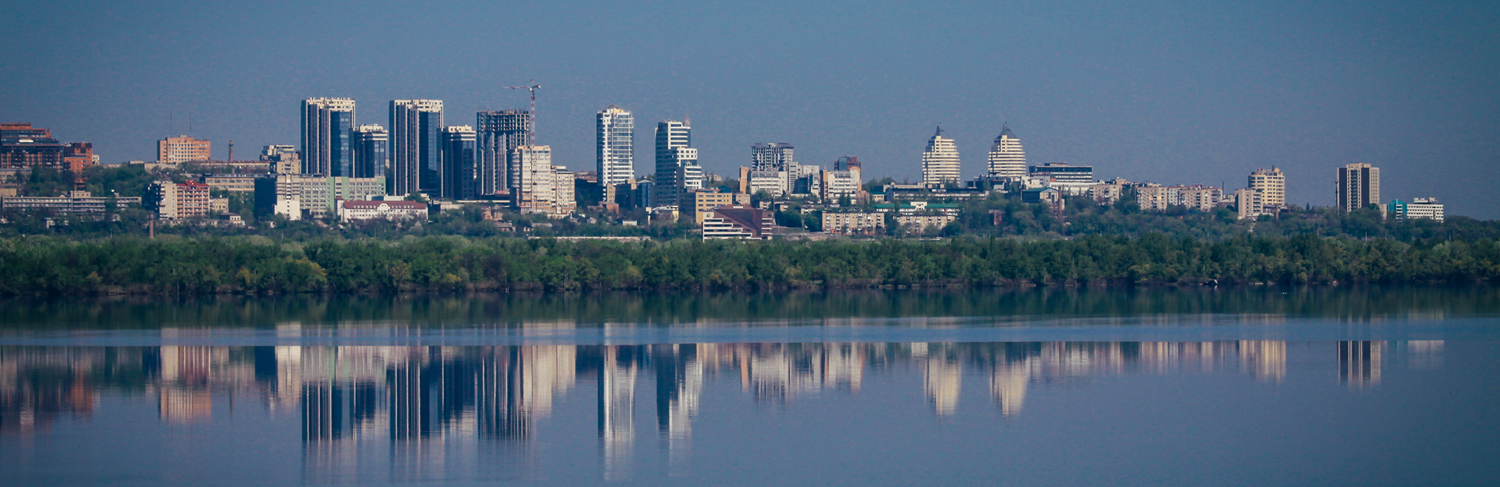
A panoramic view of the city

== Demographics ==
Historical population
Year	Pop.	±%
1782	2,194	—
1800	6,389	+191.2%
1811	9,000	+40.9%
1825	8,412	−6.5%
1857	13,217	+57.1%
1862	19,515	+47.7%
1866	22,846	+17.1%
1885	46,876	+105.2%
1897	112,839	+140.7%
1926	187,570	+66.2%
1939	500,636	+166.9%
1943	280,000	−44.1%
1959	661,547	+136.3%
1970	862,100	+30.3%
1979	1,066,016	+23.7%
1989	1,177,897	+10.5%
2001	1,065,008	−9.6%
2011	1,004,853	−5.6%
2022	968,502	−3.6%

The population of the city is about 1 million people. In 2011, the average age of the city's resident population was 40 years. The number of males declined slightly more than the number of females. The natural population growth in Dnipro is slightly higher than growth in Ukraine in general.

Between 1923 and 1933 the Ukrainian proportion of the population of the city increased from 16% to 48%. This was part of a national trend.

Year	Ethnicity of Citizens					Foreign Citizens	Reference
Year	Russian	Ukrainian	Jewish	Polish	German	Foreign Citizens	Reference
1887	47,200	17,787	39,979	3,418	1,438	1,075	
1887	42.6%	16.0%	36.1%	3.1%	1.3%	1.0%	
1904(?)	52%		40%	4.5%	Not Stated	Not Stated	

Ethnic group	1926	1939	1959	1989	2001	2017
Ukrainians	36.0%	54.6%	61.5%	62.5%	72.6%	82%
Russians	31.6%	23.4%	27.9%	31.0%	23.5%	13%
Jews	26.8%	17.9%	7.6%	3.2%	1.0%
Belarusians	1.9%	1.9%	1.7%		1.0%

In a survey in June–July 2017, 9% of residents said that they spoke Ukrainian at home, 63% spoke Russian, and 25% spoke Ukrainian and Russian equally.

The same survey reported the following results for the religion of adult residents.

- 49% Ukrainian Orthodox Church of the Kyivan Patriarchate
- 6% Ukrainian Orthodox Church of the Moscow Patriarchate
- 7% atheist
- 1% belong to other religions
- 28% believe in God, but do not belong to any religion
- 5% found it difficult to answer

According to a survey conducted by the International Republican Institute in April–May 2023, 27% of the city's population spoke Ukrainian at home, and 66% spoke Russian.

== Economy ==
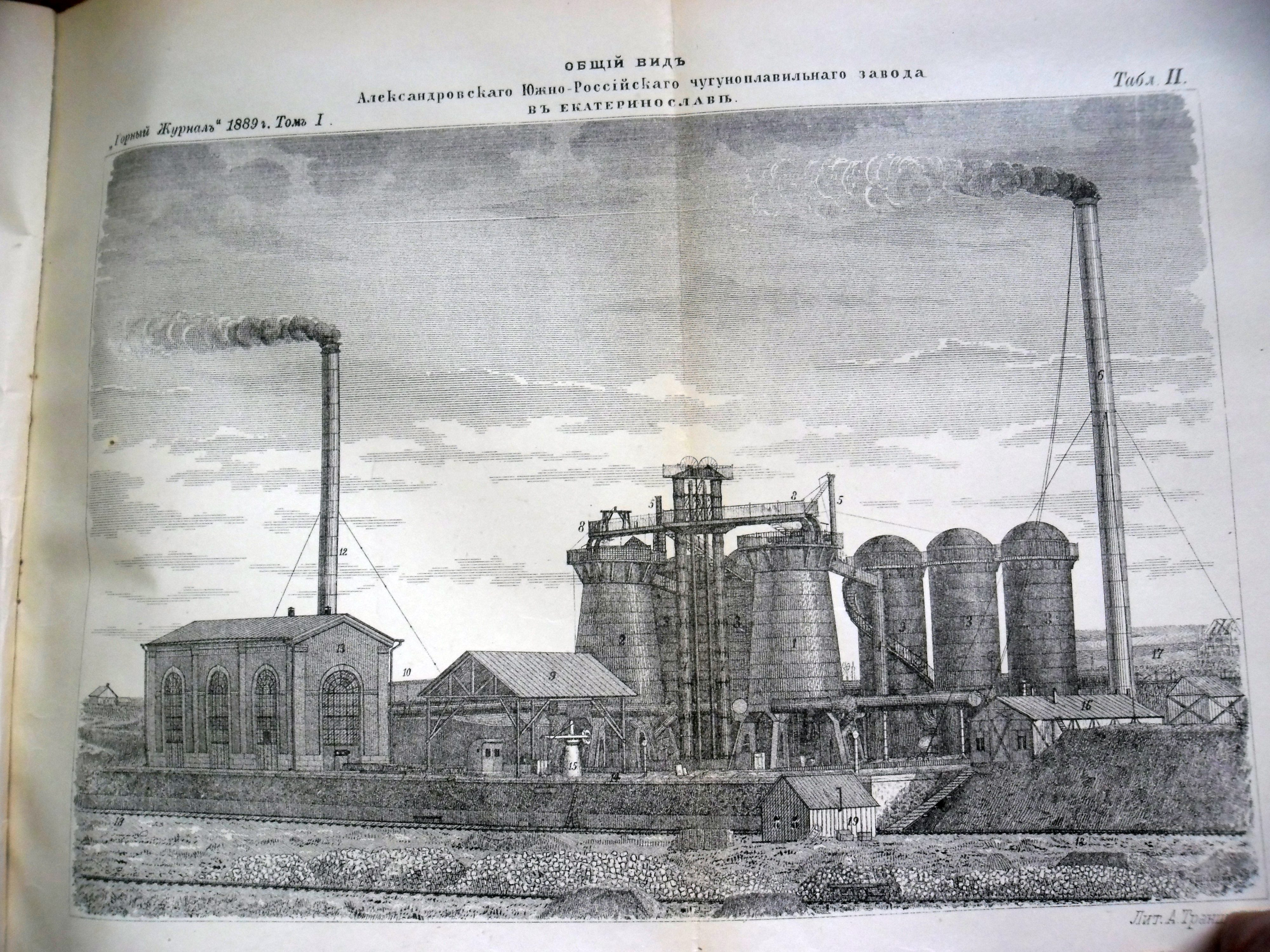
The Alexander Southern Russian Ironworks and Rolling Mill of the Bryansk Joint-Stock Company (currently the Dniprovsky Metallurgical Plant) depicted in 1889.

Dnipro is a major industrial centre of Ukraine. It has several facilities devoted to heavy industry that produce a wide range of products, including cast-iron, launch vehicles, rolled metal, pipes, machinery, different mining combines, agricultural equipment, tractors, trolleybuses, refrigerators, different chemicals and many others. The most famous and the oldest (founded in the 19th century) is the Dniprovsky Metallurgical Plant (from 1922 until the time of decommunization in Ukraine, the plant was named after the Soviet Union statesman Grigory Petrovsky). Other notable industrial company of Dnipro is PA Pivdenmash, a heavy machinery and rocket manufacturer.

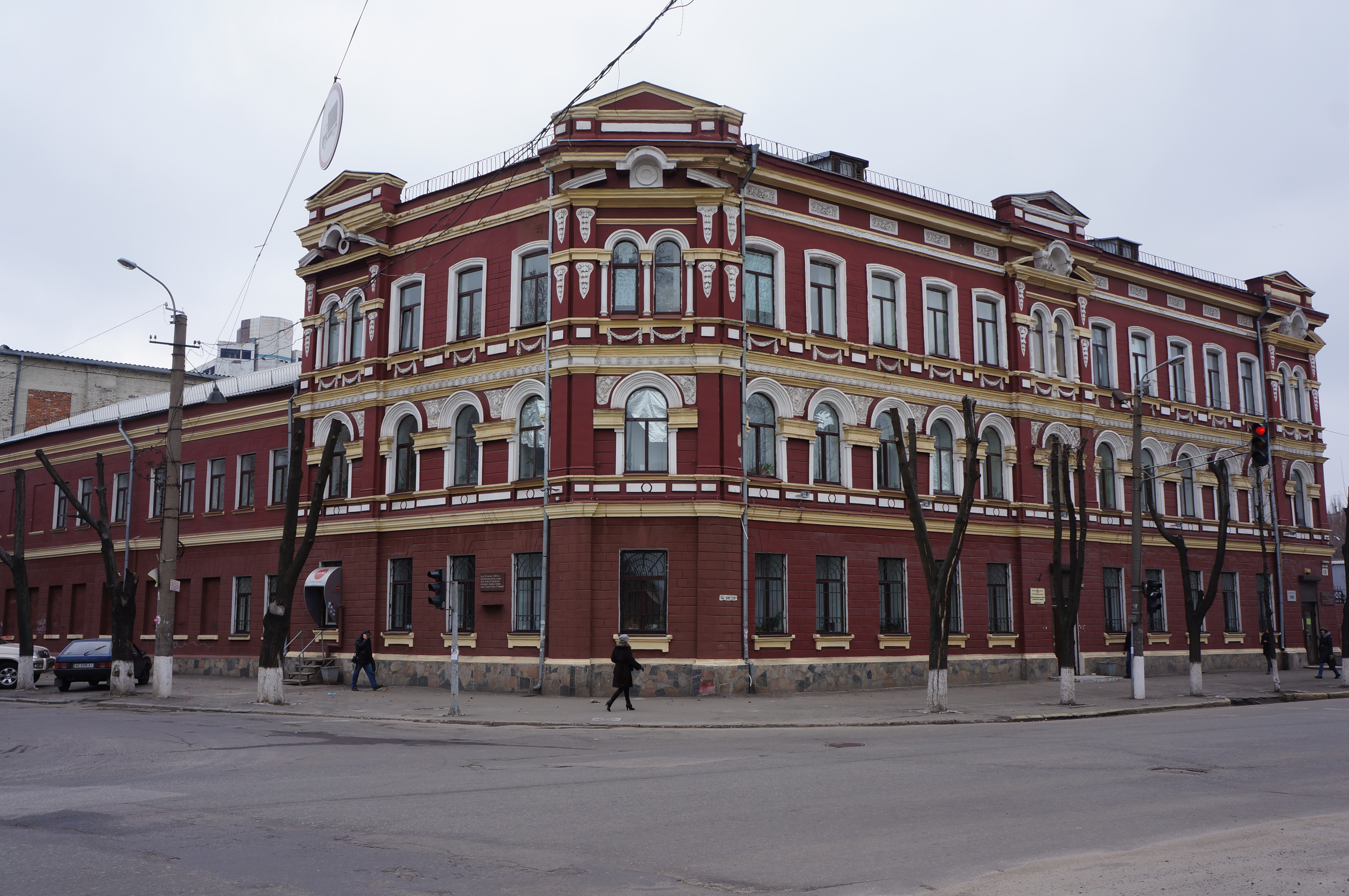
Headquarters of the Dnipro Regional Energy Network

Year	Factories & Plants	Employees	Production Volume			Reference
Year	Factories & Plants	Employees	roubles	2007 £stg million	2007 US$ million	Reference
1880	49	572	1,500,000	£10.5 m	$21 m	
1903	194	10,649	21,500,000	£177.5 m	$355 m	

Year	Enterprises	Earnings			Reference
Year	Enterprises	roubles	£2007 stg million	2007 US$ million	Reference
1900	1,800	40,000,000	£328.7 m	$658 m	
1940	622	1,096,929,000	£2,120.3 m	$4,242 m	

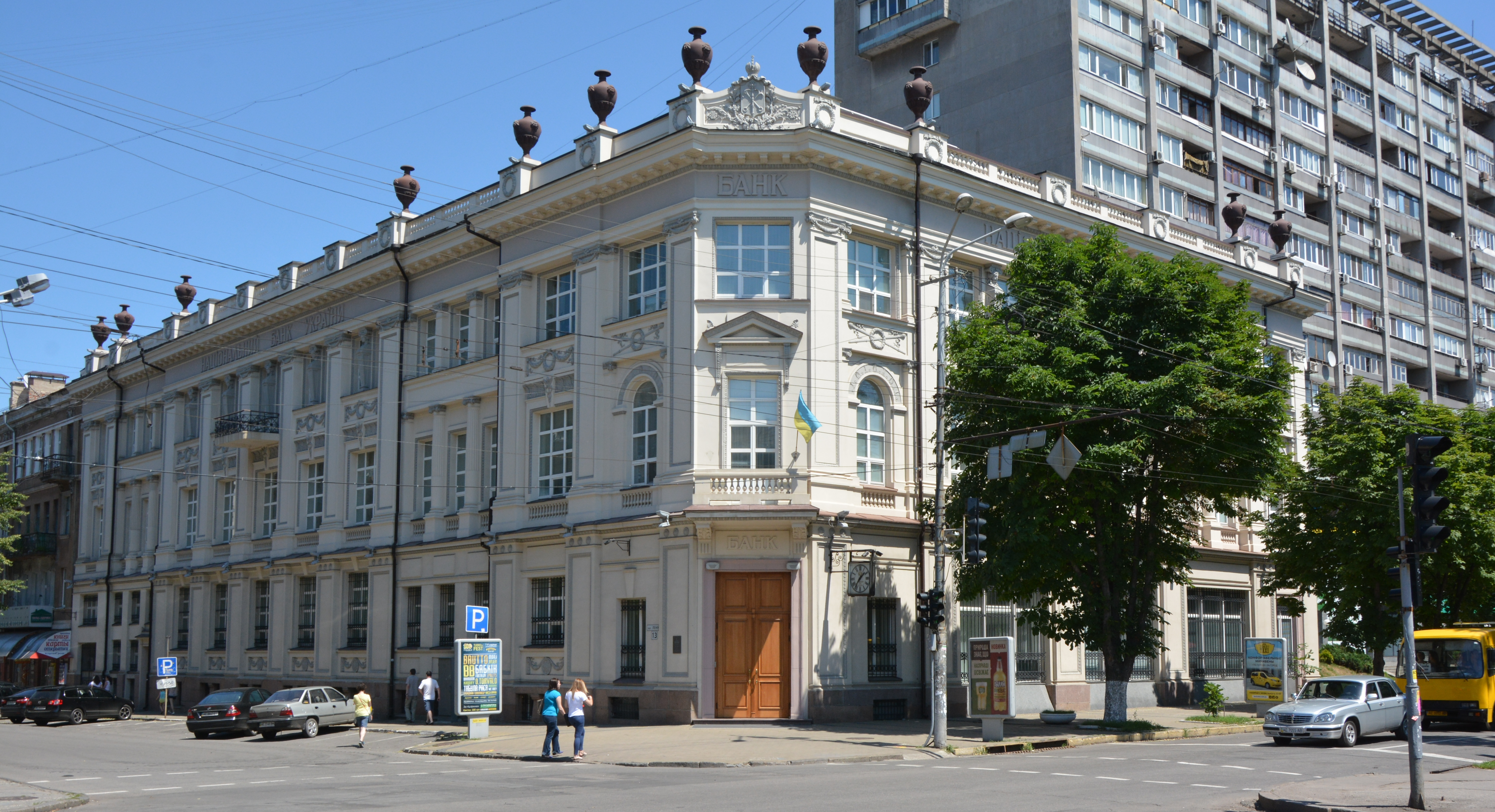
Dnipro branch of the National Bank of Ukraine

Metals and metallurgy is the city's core industry in terms of output. Employment in the city is concentrated in large-sized enterprises. Metallurgical enterprises are based in the city and account for over 47% of its industrial output. These enterprises are important contributors to the city's budget and, with 80% of their output being exported, to Ukraine's foreign exchange reserve. Dnipro serves as the main import hub for foreign goods coming into the oblast and, on average, accounted for 58% of the oblast's imports between 2005 and 2011. With economic conditions improving even further in 2010 and 2011, registered unemployment fell to about 4,100 by the end of 2011.

The city of Dnipro's economy is dominated by the wholesale and retail trade sector, which accounted for 53% of the output of non-financial enterprises in 2010.

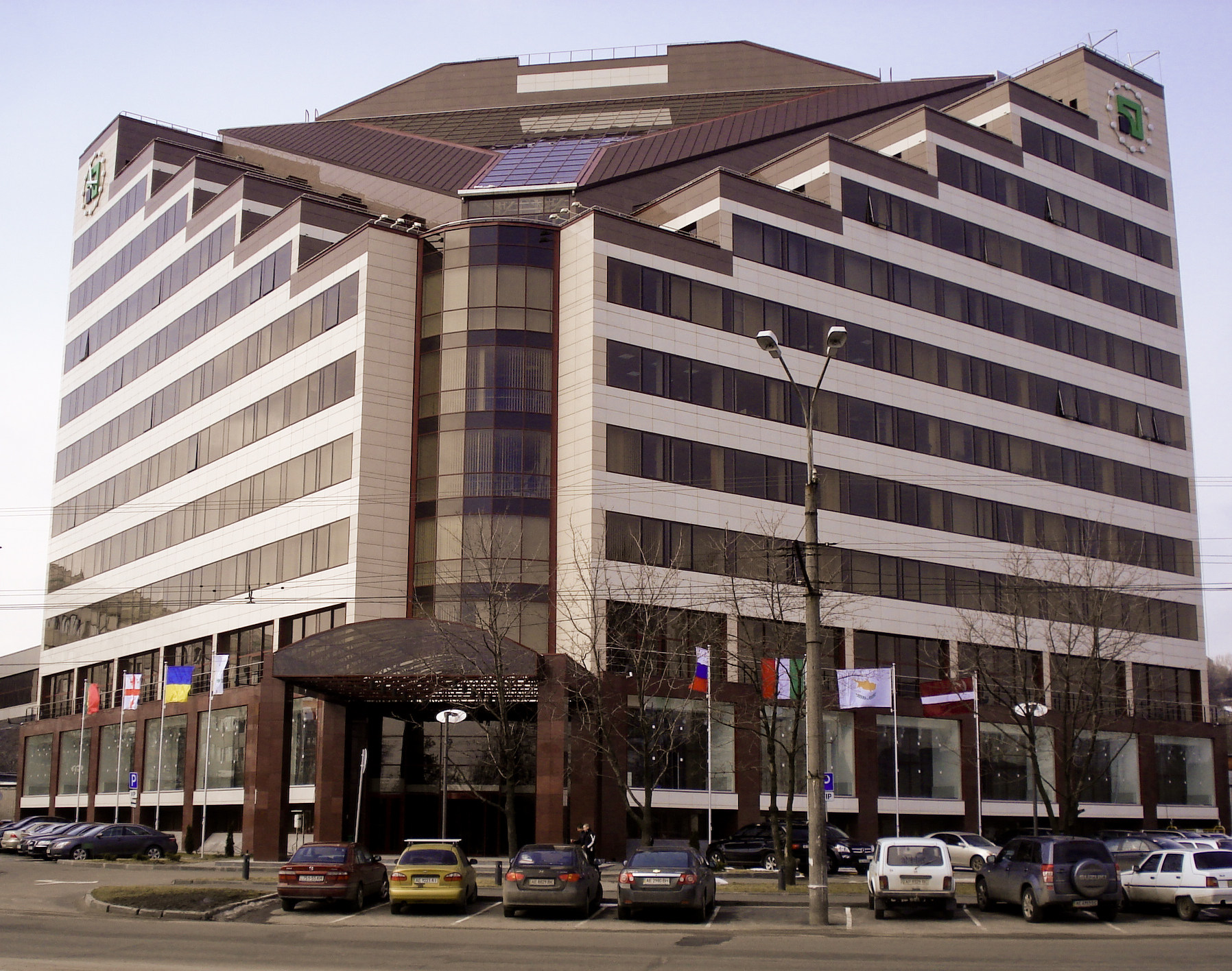
Main office of PrivatBank

Entrepreneur Ihor Kolomoyskyi's Privat Group, a global business group, is based in the city and grouped around the Privatbank. Privat Group controls thousands of companies of virtually every industry in Ukraine, European Union, Georgia, Ghana, Russia, Romania, United States and other countries. Steel, oil & gas, chemical and energy are sectors of the group's prime influence and expertise. Privat Group is in business conflict with the Interpipe, also based in Dnipro area. The influential metallurgical mill company founded and mostly owned by the local business oligarch Viktor Pinchuk.

Another company headquartered in Dnipro is ATB-Market. This company owns the largest national network of retail shops.

None of the group's capital is publicly traded on the stock exchange. Group's founding owners are natives of Dnipro and made their entire career here. Privatbank, the core of the group, is the largest commercial bank in Ukraine. In March 2014 was named by the American review magazine Global Finance as "the Best Bank in Ukraine for 2014" while British magazine The Banker in November 2013 named again the same bank as "the Bank of the year 2013 in Ukraine".

In 2018 a private Texas-based aerospace firm Firefly Aerospace opened a Research and Development (R&D) centre in Dnipro to develop small and medium-sized launch vehicles for commercial launches to orbit.

In 2026 the Dnipro Chamber of Commerce officially opened a joint economic cooperation centre with the Polish region of Lower Silesia.

== Transport ==
=== Local transportation ===
Akademik Yavornitskyi Prospekt, Dnipro's central avenue, features a green pedestrian boulevard and a tram line

The main forms of public transport used in Dnipro are trams, buses and electric trolley buses. In addition to this there are a large number of taxi firms operating in the city, and many residents have private cars.

The city's municipal roads also suffer from the same funding problems as the trams, with many of them in a very poor technical state. It is not uncommon to find very large potholes and crumbling surfaces on many of Dnipro's smaller roads. Major roads and highways are of better quality. In the early 2010s the situation was improving, with a number of new used trams bought from the German cities of Dresden and Magdeburg, and a number of roads, including Schmidt Street (now Stepan Bandera Street) and Moskovsky Street (now Volodymyr Monomakh Street) were being reconstructed with modern road-building techniques.

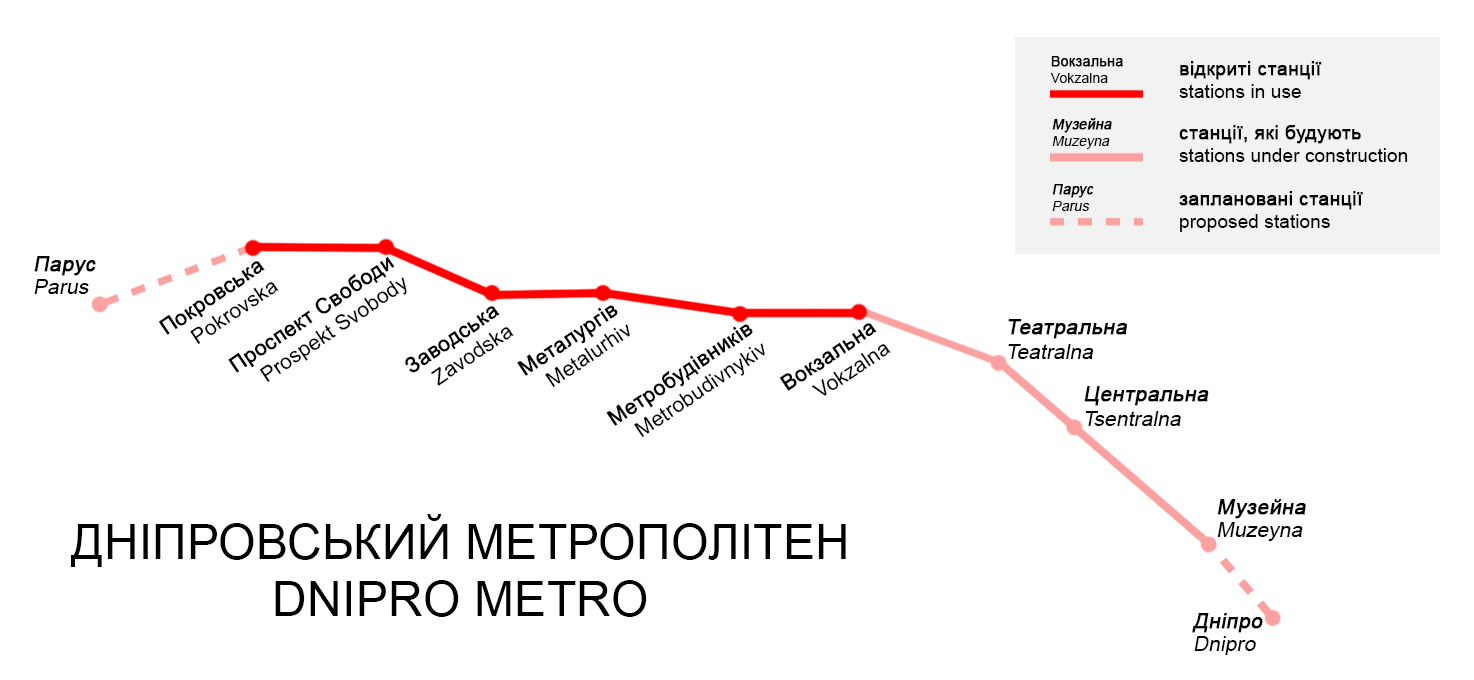
A scheme of the Dnipro Metro system in the city

Dnipro also has a metro system, opened in 1995, which consists of one line and 6 stations. The 1980 official plans for four different lines were never made reality. In 2011 the metro was transferred to municipal ownership in the hope that this will help it secure a loan from the European Bank for Reconstruction and Development. In 2011, plans envisioned an expansion of three station, Teatralna, Tsentralna and Muzeina, to be completed by 2015. The opening of these three stations have been repeatedly delayed, and after the February 2022 full-scale Russian invasion of Ukraine all work on the expansion stopped. The extension will increase the number of stations to nine, which would extend the line 4 km to a total of 11.8 km (7.3-mile).

=== Suburban transportation ===
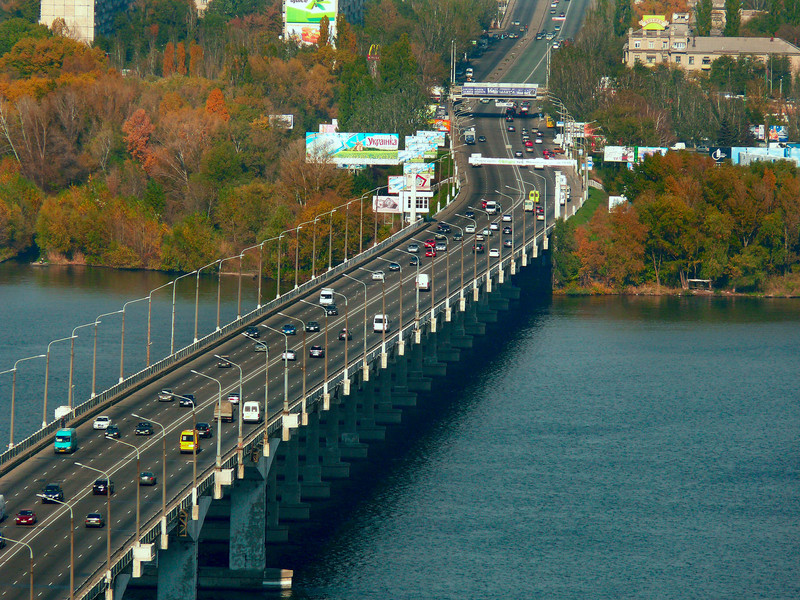
Bridges linking the city's right and left banks are heavily used

Dnipro has some highways crossing through the city. The most popular routes are from Kyiv, Donetsk, Kharkiv and Zaporizhzhia. Transit through the city is also available. As of 2011 the city is also seeing construction of a southern urban bypass, which will allow automobile traffic to proceed around the city centre. This is expected to both improve air quality and reduce transport issues from heavy freight lorries that pass through the city centre.

The largest bus station in eastern Ukraine is located in Dnipro, from where bus routes are available to all over the country, including some international routes to Poland, Germany, Moldova and Turkey. It is located near the city's central railway station. Since the start of the 2022 Russian invasion of Ukraine Ukraine's border crossings with Russia and Belarus are closed to regular traffic.

In the summertime, there are some routes available by hydrofoils on the Dnieper River, while various tourist ships on their way down the river, (Kyiv–Kherson–Odesa) tend to make a stop in the city. Dnipro's river port is located close to the area surrounding the central railway station, on the banks of the river.

=== Rail ===
Dnipro's main station is one of eastern Ukraine's largest

The city is a large railway junction, with many daily trains running to and from Eastern Europe and on domestic routes within Ukraine.

There are two railway terminals, Dnipro Holovnyi (main station) and Dnipro Lotsmanska (south station).

Two express passenger services run each day between Kyiv and Dnipro under the name 'Capital Express'. Other daytime services include suburban trains to towns and villages in the surrounding Dnipropetrovsk Oblast. Most long-distance trains tend to run at night to reduce the amount of daytime hours spent travelling by each passenger.

Domestic connections exist between Dnipro and Kyiv, Lviv, Odesa, Ivano-Frankivsk, Truskavets, Kharkiv and many other smaller Ukrainian cities, while international destinations include, among others the Bulgarian seaside resort of Varna. Following the 2022 Russian invasion of Ukraine all railway connection between Ukraine and Belarus were axed. Meaning that the pre-war international destinations to Minsk in Belarus, Moscow's Kursky Station and Saint Petersburg's Vitebsky Station in Russia and Baku—the capital of Azerbaijan—are no longer in service.

=== Aviation ===
The city is served by Dnipro International Airport (IATA: DNK) and is connected to European and Middle Eastern cities with daily flights. It is located 15 km (9.3 mi) southeast from the city centre. A Russian attack on 10 April 2022 completely destroyed the airport and the infrastructure nearby.

=== Water transportation ===
The city has a river port located on the left bank of the Dnieper. There is also a railway freight station.

== Education ==
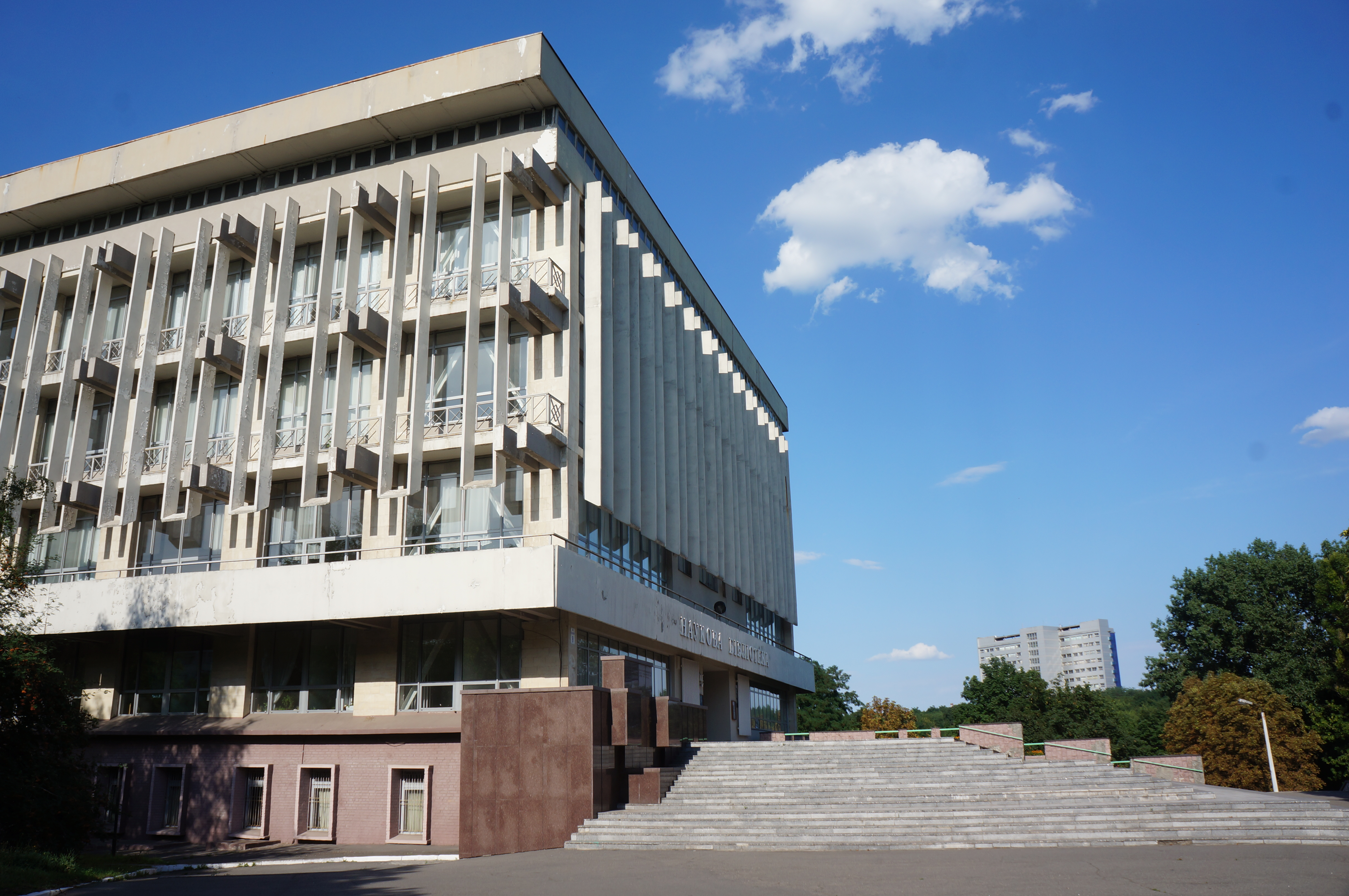
Oles Honchar National University is one of the leading establishments of higher education in Ukraine.

There are 163 educational institutions among them schools, gymnasiums and boarding schools. For children of pre-school age there are 174 institutions, also a lot of out-of -school institutions such as centre of out-of-school work. Eighty-seven institutions that are recognized on all Ukrainian and regional levels.

In a survey in June–July 2017, adult respondents reported the following educational levels:

- 1% primary or incomplete secondary education
- 13% general secondary education
- 46% vocational secondary education
- 39% university education (including incomplete university education)

In 2006 Dnipropetrovsk hosted the All-Ukrainian Olympiad in Information Technology; in 2008, that for Mathematics, and in 2009 the semi-final of the All-Ukrainian Olympiad in Programming for the Eastern Region. In the same year as the latter took place, the youth group 'Eksperiment', an organisation promoting increased cultural awareness amongst Ukrainians, was founded in the city.

=== Higher education ===
Dnipro is a major educational centre in Ukraine and is home to two of Ukraine's top-ten universities; the Oles Honchar Dnipro National University and Dnipro Polytechnic National Technical University. The system of high education institutions connects 38 institutions in Dnipro, among them 14 of IV and ІІІ levels of accreditation, and 22 of І and ІІ levels of accreditation. In year 2012 National Mining Institute was on the 7th and National University named after O. Honchar was on the 9th place among the best high education institutions in "TOP-200 Ukraine" list.

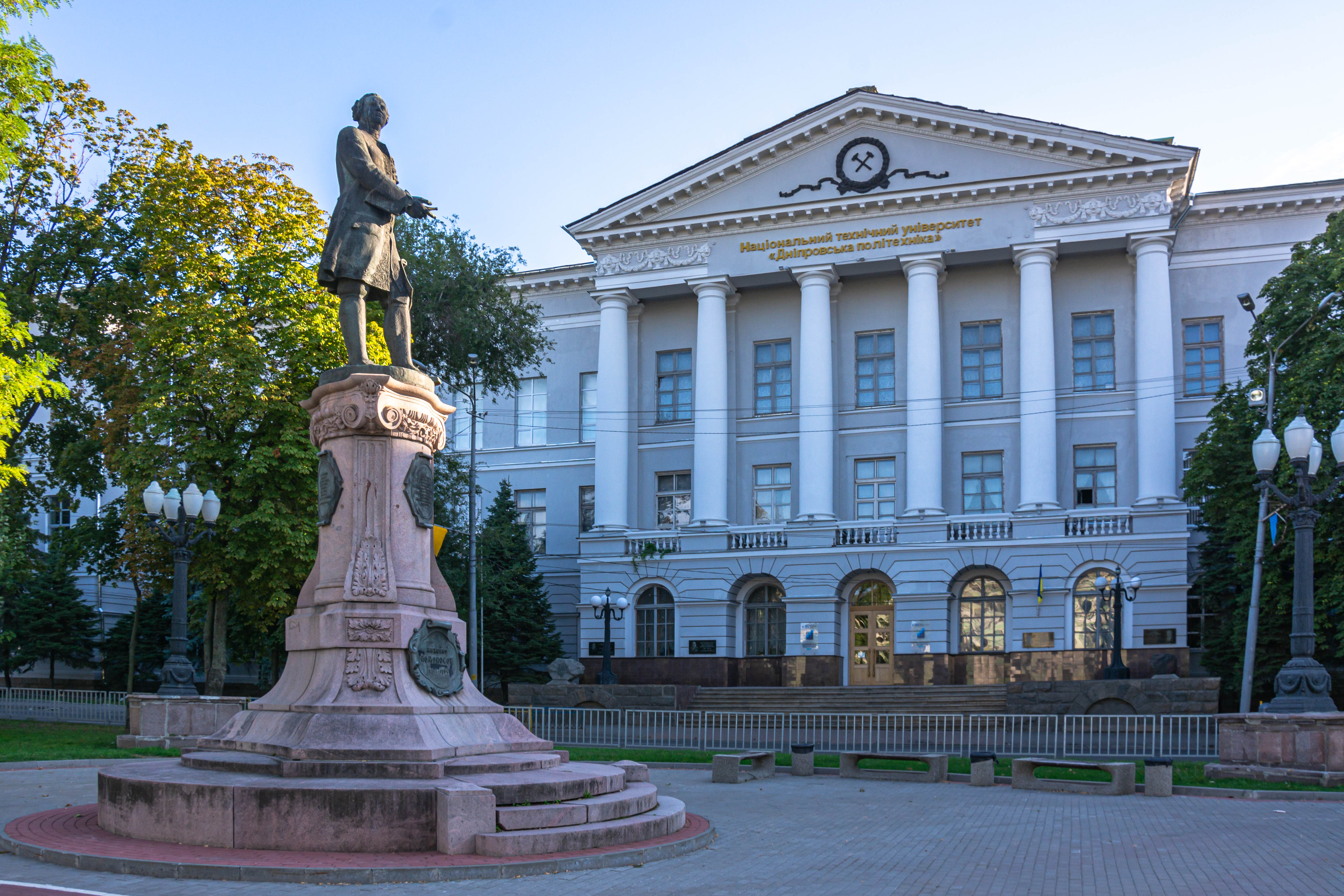
The main building of the Dnipro Polytechnic

The list below is a list of all current state-organised higher educational institutions (not included are non-independent subdivisions of other universities not based in Dnipro).

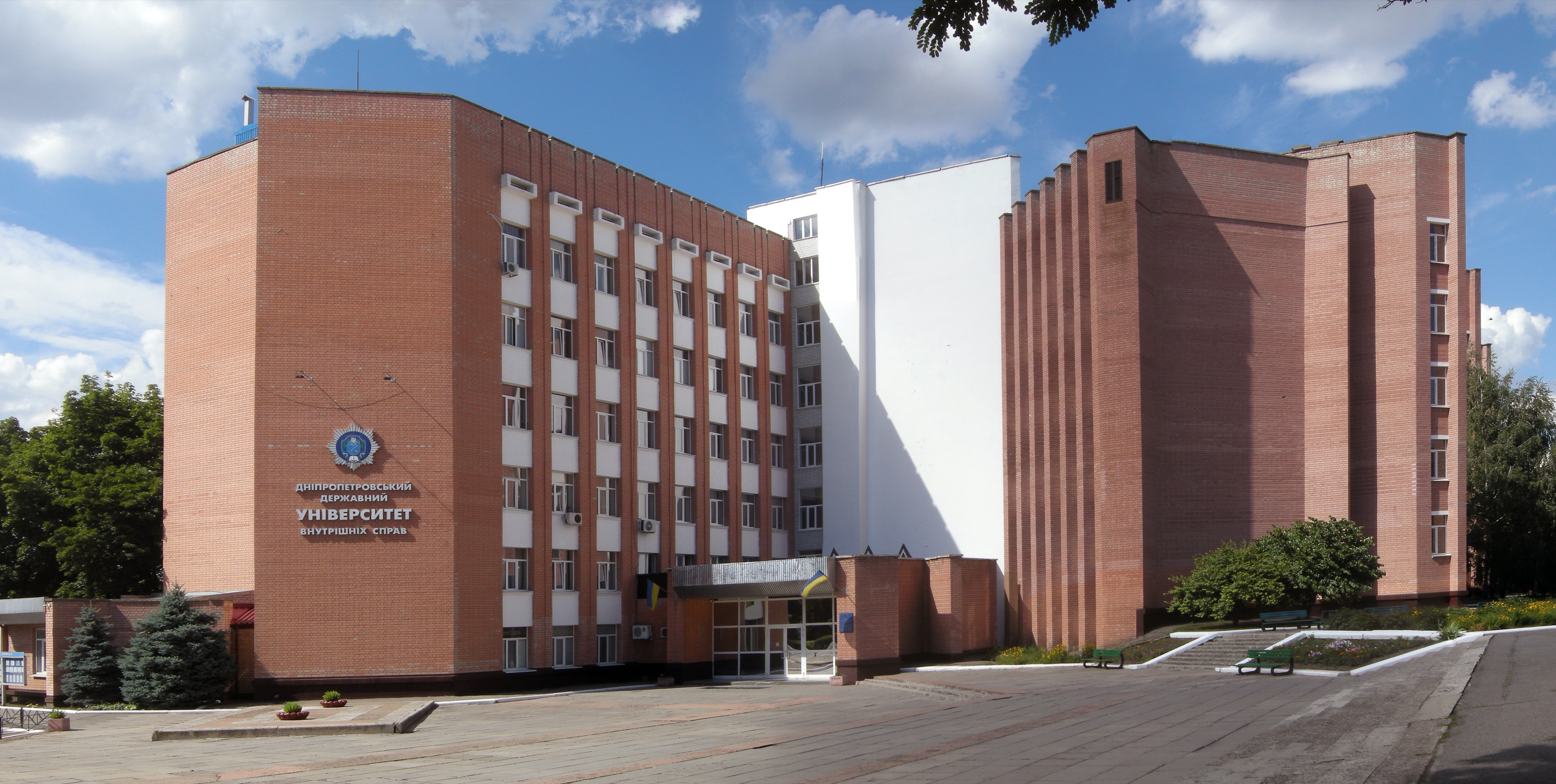
Dnipro State University of Internal Affairs

Alfred Nobel University campus in Dnipro

- Oles Honchar Dnipro National University was founded in 1918. At the present day it has nationwide meaning and consists of 20 faculties, 80 specialities, 43 laboratories and scientific-research institutes.
- Prydniprovska State Academy of Physical Culture and Sport
- Dnipro Polytechnic
- Dnipro State Medical University is one of the oldest educational institutions in Ukraine which includes 6 faculties and almost 60 departments.
- National Metallurgical Academy of Ukraine was founded in 1899.
- Ukrainian State Chemical-Technological University
- Dnipro State University of Internal Affairs
- University of Customs and Finance
- Prydniprovska State Academy of Civil Engineering and Architecture one from 8 IHEs in Ukraine which is the member of the International Association of Universities.
- Dnipro National University of Railway Transport
- Dnipro Agricultural University
- Alfred Nobel University
- Institute of the Inter-regional Academy for Human Resources
- Dnipropetrovsk regional institute of the Presidential Civil Service Academy of Ukraine
- Institute for the Preparation of Industrial Experts

In the 21st century annually around 55,000 students studied in Dnipro, a significant number of whom students from abroad.

== Culture ==
=== Attractions ===
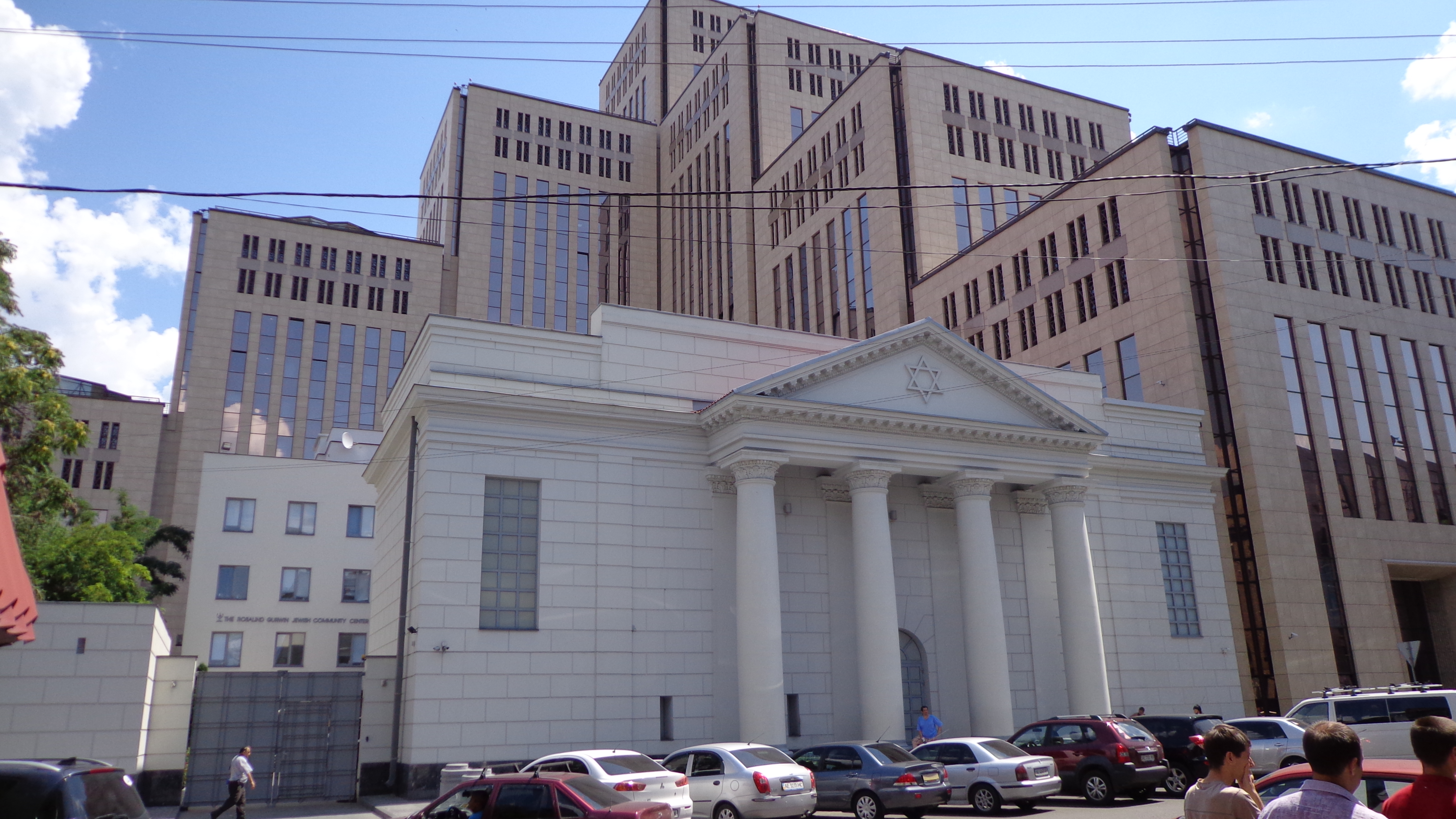
Synagogue and Menorah Center

Dnipro has a variety of theatres (Dnipro Academic Drama and Comedy Theatre, Taras Shevchenko Dnipro Academic Ukrainian Music and Drama Theatre and Dnipro Opera and Ballet Theatre), a circus (Dnipro State Circus) and several museums (Dmytro Yavornytsky National Historical Museum, Diorama "Battle of the Dnieper" and Dnipro Art Museum). There are also several restaurants, beaches and parks (Taras Shevchenko Park and Sevastopol Park).

The major streets of the city were renamed in honour of Marxist heroes during the Soviet era. Following the 2015 law on decommunization these have been renamed.

The central thoroughfare is known as Akademik Yavornytskyi Prospekt, a wide and long boulevard that stretches east to west through the centre of the city. It was founded in the 18th century and parts of its buildings are the actual decoration of the city. In the heart of the city is Soborna Square, which includes the Transfiguration Cathedral founded by order of Catherine the Great in 1787. On the square, there are some remarkable buildings: the Museum of History, Diorama "Battle of the Dnieper" (World War II).

The Ukrposhta for the city was once housed at the Central Post Office, a 20th-century building. Rising magnificently above the Dnieper, the building's tower has become one of the most identifiable features in the city.

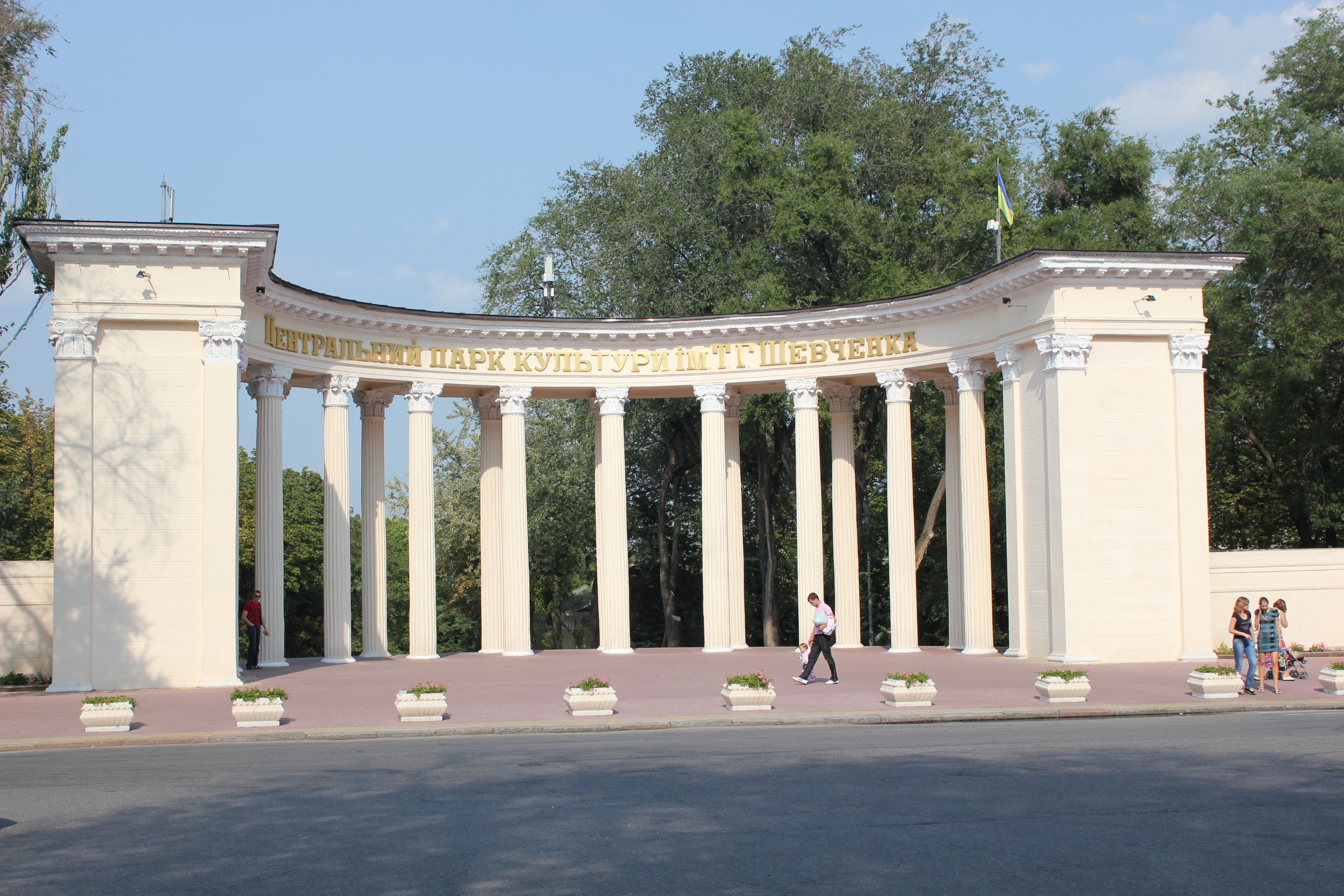
Entrance to the Taras Shevchenko Park

Further from the city centre and next to the Dnieper River (spelled "Dnipro" in Ukrainian) is the large Taras Shevchenko Park (which is on the right bank of the river) and Monastyrskyi Island. In the 9th century, Byzantine monks based a monastery here.

The Governor's House is a 19th-century building which formerly housed the Governor of Yekaterinoslav. Since 2020, it became the home of the Museum of Dnipro City History.

A few areas retain their historical character: all of Central Avenue, some street-blocks on the main hill (the Nagorna part) between Lesya Ukrainka Avenue and Embankment, and sections near Globa (formerly known as Chkalov park until it was renamed) and Shevchenko parks have been untouched for 150 years.

The river keeps the climate mild. It is visible from many points in Dnipro. From any of the three hills in the city, one can see a view of the river, islands, parks, outskirts, river banks and other hills.

There was no need to build skyscrapers in the city in Soviet times. The major industries preferred to locate their offices close to their factories and away from the centre of town. Most new office buildings are built in the same architectural style as the old buildings. A number, however, display more modern aesthetics, and some blend the two styles.

=== Religion ===
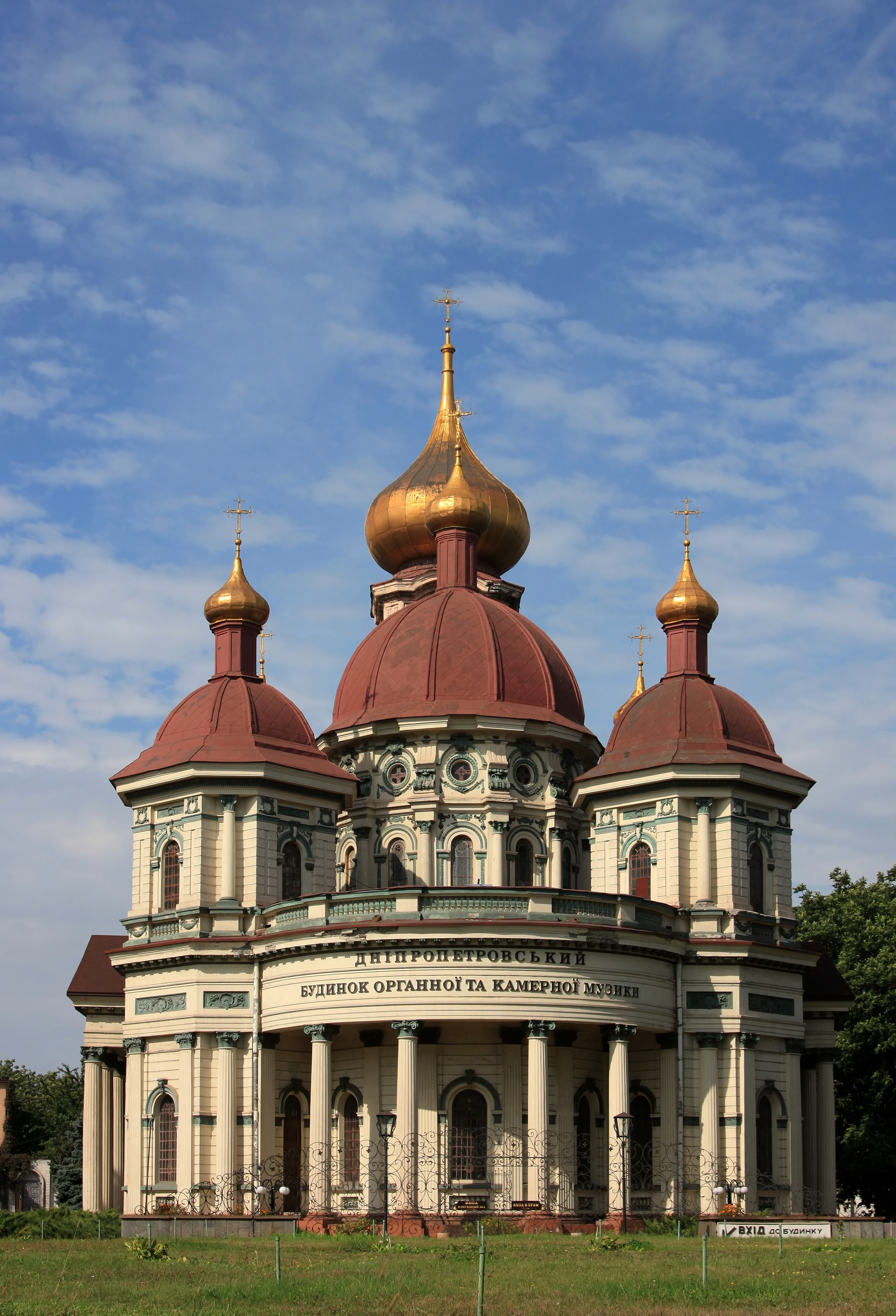
Dnipropetrovsk House Of Organ And Chamber Music

Ludwig Charlemagne-Bode and Pietro Visconti designed and erected the 19th century Holy Trinity Cathedral in Dnipro, which is an Eastern Orthodox cathedral of the UOC of the Moscow Patriarchate. It was known as the Trinity Church for most of the 1800s until changing to the Church of the Descent of the Holy Spirit. It is now a historical landmark within the city.

The UOC's Dnipropetrovsk House Of Organ And Chamber Music is a performance hall and an Eastern Orthodox cathedral from the 20th century. In addition, the structure is a national architectural and historical landmark.

The Saint Nicholas Church in Dnipro is a national monument and the Eastern Orthodox cathedral of the UOC from the 19th century. It is located on what was formerly Novi Kodaky property and is the oldest church in Dnipro.

The German Evangelical-Lutheran Church in Ukraine (GELCU) owns the 19th-century Evangelical Lutheran Church of St. Catherine. It is also known as the St. Catherine Evangelical Lutheran Church. It is the first church in Ukraine to open after independence.

== Sports ==
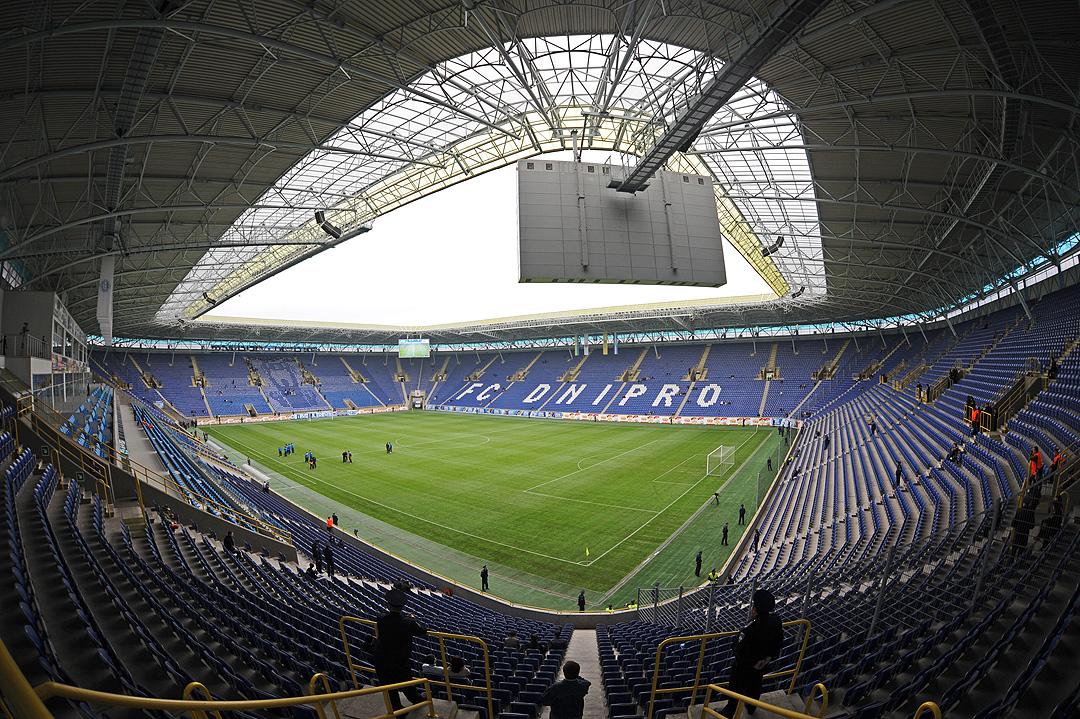
Dnipro-Arena

FC Dnipro is the most successful football club of the city. It is a former second runner-up in the Ukrainian Premier League and in the UEFA Cup it reached and lost the 2015 UEFA Europa League Final. It also was the only Soviet team to win the USSR Federation Cup twice. The club was owned by the Privat Group. The club has been inactive since 2019. Note: A bandy team, a basketball team and others use the same name.

Other local football clubs include: FC Lokomotyv Dnipropetrovsk and FC Spartak Dnipropetrovsk, both of which have large fan bases. SC Dnipro-1 is another team emerged in 2017. SC Dnipro-1 established itself as the most successful club in town; playing in the Ukrainian Premier League, the UEFA Europa League and the UEFA Europa Conference League.

In 2008 the city built a new soccer stadium; the Dnipro-Arena has a capacity of 31,003 people and was built as a replacement for Dnipro's old stadium, Stadium Meteor. The Dnipro-Arena hosted the 2010 FIFA World Cup qualification game between Ukraine and England on 10 October 2009. The Dnipro Arena was initially chosen as one of the Ukrainian venues for their joint Euro 2012 bid with Poland. However, it was dropped from the list in May 2009 as the capacity fell short of the minimum 33,000 seats required by UEFA. The city is home to BC Dnipro, champion of the 2019–20 Ukrainian Basketball SuperLeague. The team plays its home games at the Palace of Sports Shynnik.

The city is the centre of Ukrainian bandy. The Ukrainian Federation of Bandy and Rink-Bandy has its office in the city. The foremost local bandy club is Dnipro, which won the Ukrainian championship in 2014.

== Notable people ==
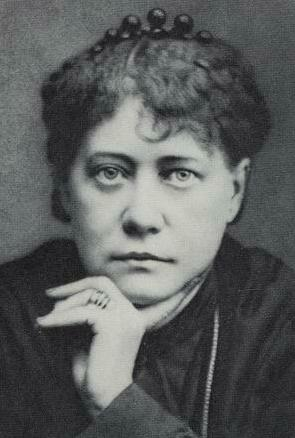
Helena Blavatsky, 1877

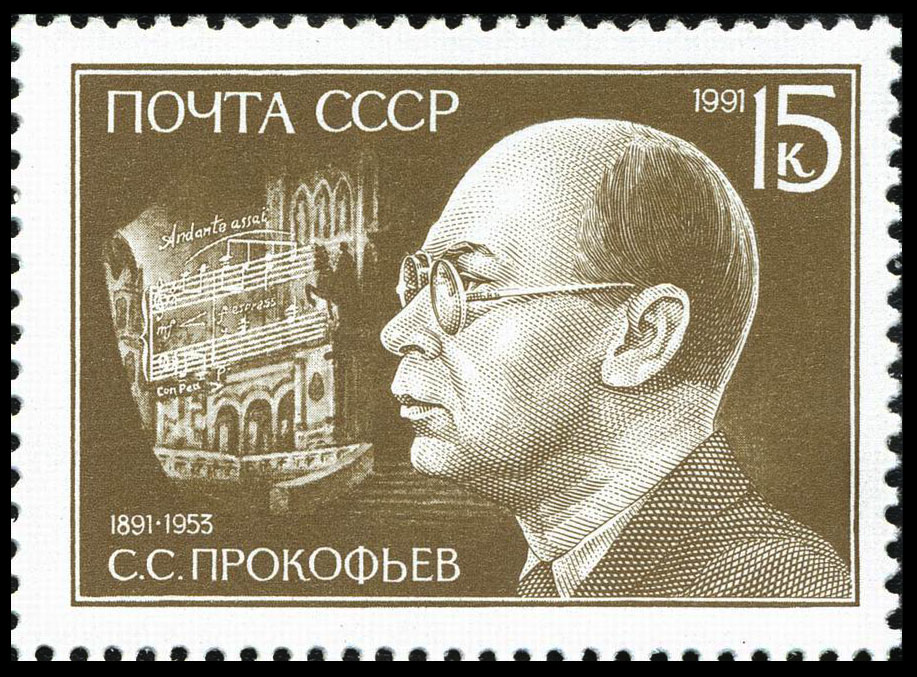
USSR stamp, centenary of Sergei Prokofiev, 1991

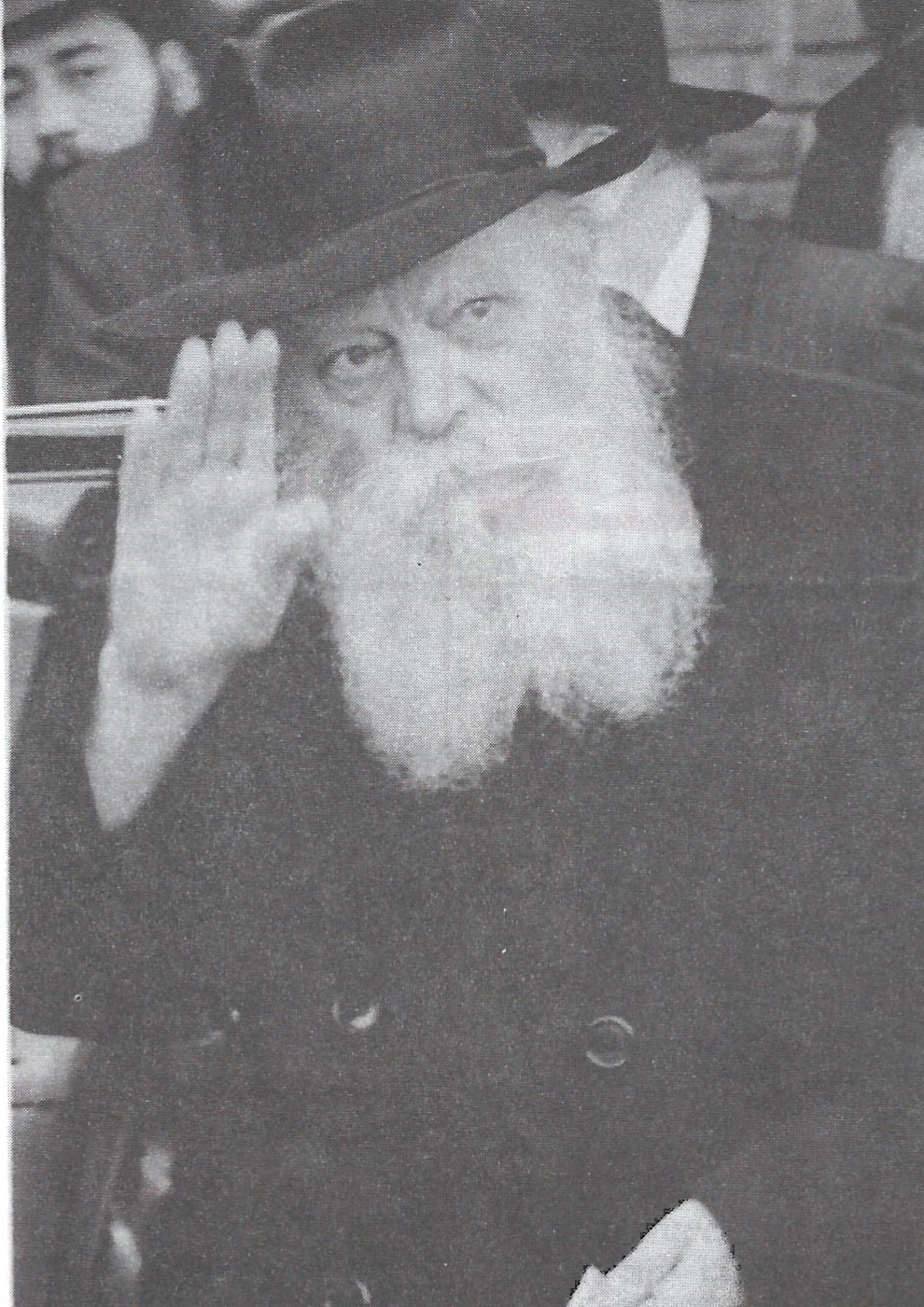
Menachem Mendel Schneerson, 1992

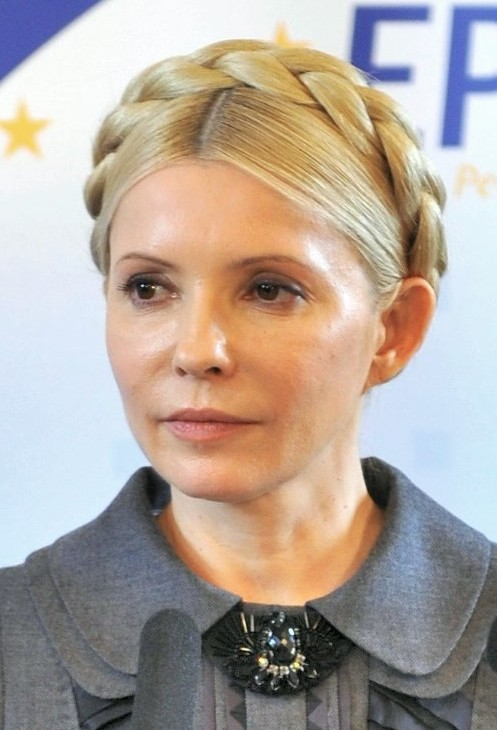
Yulia Tymoshenko, 2011

- Peter Arshinov (1886–1937) – Ukrainian anarchist revolutionary and intellectual, chronicled the history of the Makhnovshchina, a stateless anarchist society in Ukraine.
- Helena Blavatsky (1831–1891) – founder of Theosophical Society.
- Gennadiy Bogolyubov (born 1961/1962) – Ukrainian-Cypriot-Israeli billionaire businessman, Privat Group.
- Viktor Chebrikov (1923–1999) – head of the KGB 1982–1988.
- Dmytro Derevytskyy (born 1973) – Ukrainian entrepreneur
- Katherine Esau (1898–1997) German-American botanist.
- Mishel and Nicol Feldman (born 1996) – Ukrainian artist duo.
- Borys Filatov (born 1972) – The current mayor of Dnipro.
- Vsevolod Garshin (1855–1888) – Russian author of short stories.
- Helen Gerardia (1903–1988) – American painter.
- Linor Goralik (born 1975) flash fiction author, poet and essayist.
- Oles Honchar (1918–1995) – Ukrainian writer and public figure and member of the Ukrainian parliament.
- Ilya Kabakov (born 1933) – Russian–American conceptual artist.
- Pavlo Khazan (born 1974) – Ukrainian ecologist and politician.
- Ihor Kolomoyskyi (born 1963 – U.S.-indicted Ukrainian-Cypriot-Israeli billionaire businessman, Privat Group.
- Leonid Kogan (1924–1982) – violinist.
- Yuri Krasny (born 1946) — educational theorist.
- Victor Kravchenko (1905–1966) Soviet defector.
- Valerii Kryshen (born 1955) – scientist, doctor of medicine and professor.
- Leonid Kuchma (born 1938) – President of Ukraine in 1994–2005.
- Ihor Lachenkov (born 1999) – Influencer, blogger and volunteer.
- Leonid Levin (born 1948) Soviet-American mathematician and computer scientist.
- Lera Loeb (born c. 1979 – 1980) – fashion blogger and publicist.
- Konstantin Lopushansky (born 1947) – film director, film theorist and author.
- Pavlo Matviienko (born 1973) – politician and entrepreneur.
- Marina Maximilian (born 1987) – Israeli singer-songwriter and actress.
- Yuriy Meshkov (1945–2019) – President of Crimea, 1994–1995.
- Igor Morozov (born 1948) – baritone opera singer.
- David Nachmansohn (1899–1983) – a German-Jewish biochemist.
- Viktor Petrov (1894–1969) – Ukrainian existentialist writer, pen names V. Domontovych and Viktor Ber.
- Gregor Piatigorsky (1903–1976) American classical cellist.
- Viktor Pinchuk (born 1960) – business oligarch.
- Sergei Prokofiev (1891–1953) – composer, pianist and conductor.
- Valentyn Reznichenko (born 1972) – the Governor of Dnipropetrovsk Oblast 2020–2023.
- Boris Sagal (1923–1981) – American television and film director.
- Daniel Sakhnenko (1875–1930) — Ukrainian filmmaker and director.
- Menachem Mendel Schneerson (1902–1994) – the "Lubavitcher Rebbe", head of the Chabad Movement, lived in the city as a child.
- Moses Schönfinkel (1888–1942) – a Russian logician and mathematician.
- Yuriy Tkach (born 1983) Ukrainian comedian and actor.
- Oleg Tsaryov (born 1970) – politician and separatist leader of Novorossiya in 2014.
- Oleksandr Turchynov (born 1964) – Former Secretary of the National Security and Defence Council of Ukraine.
- Kyrylo Tymoshenko (born 1989) Ukrainian politician who served as deputy Head of the Office of the President of Ukraine 2019–2023.
- Yulia Tymoshenko (born 1960) – Prime Minister of Ukraine in 2005 and 2007–10, and candidate in the 2010 Ukrainian presidential election.
- Olena Vaneeva (born 1982) – mathematician and vice head of the NASU Institute of Mathematics.
- Alexander Pavlovich Vasiliev – (1894–ca.1944), an Orthodox, later Greek-Catholic, priest.

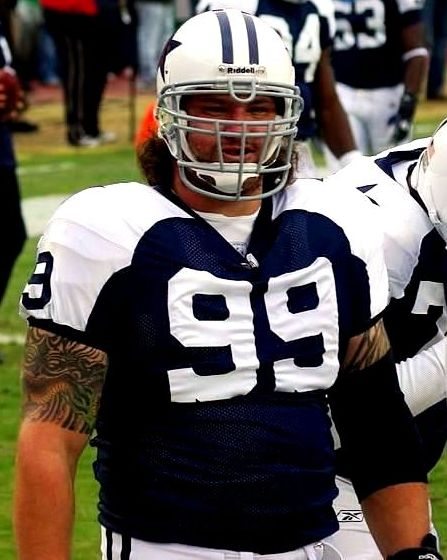
Igor Olshansky, 2011

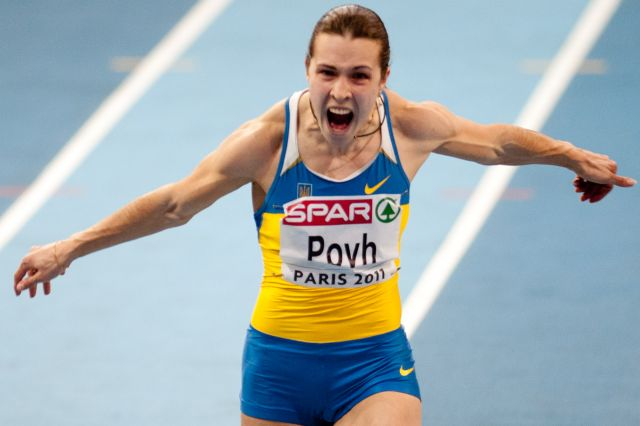
Olesya Povh, 2011

=== Sport ===
- Oksana Baiul (born 1977) – 1994 Winter Olympics figure skating gold medalist
- Anatoliy Demyanenko (born 1959) – Ukrainian football coach and former football defender.
- Artem Dolgopyat (born 1997) – Israeli artistic gymnast (Olympic medalist, second in world championships)
- Marharyta Dorozhon (born 1987) – Ukrainian/Israeli Olympic javelin thrower
- Kyrylo Fesenko (born 1986) – NBA basketball player
- Inessa Kravets (born 1966) – long jumper and triple jumper
- Yaroslava Mahuchikh (born 2001) – high jumper
- Igor Olshansky (born 1982) – NFL defensive tackle
- Olesya Povh (born 1987) – Olympic bronze medalist runner
- Oleh Protasov (born 1964) – former Ukrainian footballer
- Inna Ryzhykh (born 1985) – professional triathlete
- Adel Tankova (born 2000) – Ukrainian-born Israeli Olympic figure skater
- Oleg Tverdokhleb (1969–1995) – athlete, 400-metre hurdles
- Tatiana Volosozhar (born 1986) – figure skating Olympic gold medalist, 2014

== Twin towns – sister cities ==
Dnipro is twinned with:

- Dalian, China
- Durham, Canada
- Gomel, Belarus (2018)
- Herzliya, Israel (1992)
- (Georgia (country)) Kutaisi, Georgia
- Szczecin, Poland (2010)
- Tashkent, Uzbekistan (1998)
- Vilnius, Lithuania (1988)
- Xi'an, China (1998)
- Žilina, Slovakia (1993)
- Cologne, Germany (2024)

=== Friendship cooperation cities ===
Dnipro also cooperates with:

- Osaka, Japan (2022)
- Grand Rapids, USA (2023)

== See also ==
- Dnepropetrovsk maniacs
- Golden Rose Synagogue, Dnipro

== Sources ==
- Avrich, Paul (1971) [1967]. The Russian Anarchists. Princeton: Princeton University Press. ISBN 0691007667. OCLC 1154930946.
- Михаил Александрович Шатров (Штейн). Город на трёх холмах. – Днепропетровск: Промiнь, 1969. (in Russian)
- Алексей Николаевич Толстой. Хождение по мукам. – М.: Художественная литература, 1976. (in Russian)
- Дмитрий Яворницкий. История города Екатеринослава. – Днепропетровск: Сiч, 1996. (in Russian)
- Справочник "Освобождение городов: Справочник по освобождению городов в период Великой Отечественной войны 1941—1945" / М. Л. Дударенко, Ю. Г. Перечнев, В. Т. Елисеев и др. М.: Воениздат, 1985. 598 с. (in Russian)
- Описание населенных мест Екатеринославской губернии на 1-е января 1925 г. – Екатеринослав: Типо-Литография Екатерининской ж.д., 1925. – 635 с. (in Russian)
- Zhuk, Sergei I. (2010). Rock and Roll in the Rocket City: The West, Identity, and Ideology in Soviet Dniepropetrovsk, 1960–1985 '. Baltimore: Johns Hopkins University Press & Washington, D.C.: Woodrow Wilson Center Press. pp. 18–28.
- Hilberg, Raul (1985). The Destruction of the European Jews. New York: Holmes & Meier. ISBN 978-0-8419-0832-1.
