= Amur-Nyzhnodniprovskyi District =

Amur-Nyzhnodniprovskyi District Амур-Нижньодніпровський район
- Urban district
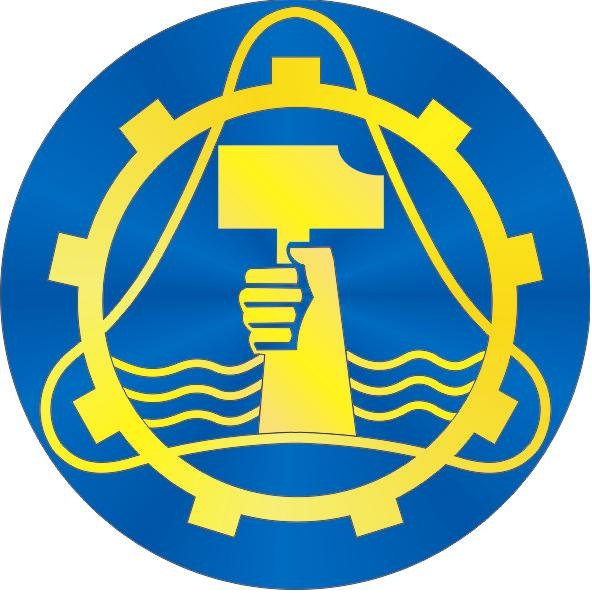
- Coat of arms
- Interactive map of Amur-Nyzhnodniprovskyi District
- Coordinates: 48°31′16″N 34°58′42″E
- Country: Ukraine
- City: Dnipro
- Established: 1918 (108 years ago)

Area
  - Total: 71.626 km^{2} (27.655 sq mi)

Population (2001 census)
  - Total: 160,123
  - Density: 2,235.5/km^{2} (5,790.0/sq mi)
- Time zone: UTC+2 (EET)
  - Summer (DST): UTC+3 (EEST)
- Postal code: 70403
- Area code: +380 562
- KOATUU: 1210136300
- Website: andrada.com.ua

The Amur-Nyzhnodniprovskyi District (Ukrainian: Амур-Нижньодніпровський район; sometimes abbr. "AND"), formerly known as Nyzhnodniprovskyi District (Нижньодніпровський район), is an urban district of the city of Dnipro, in southern Ukraine. It is located on the city's north and on the left-bank of Dnieper River along with the city's Industrialnyi and Samarskyi districts.

Its name is derived from the Amur neighborhood and the Nyzhnodniprovsk railway station. The first village located on what is now the Nyzhnodniprovskyi District was founded in the late 16th century, making the area one of the oldest inhabited parts of Dnipro.

== History ==
According to historical findings on the current territory of the Amur-Nyzhnodniprovskyi District there was a village called Kamianka that was founded in 1596. Kamianka is considered to be one of the oldest settlements in Left-bank Ukraine. In 1757 the village Berezanivka was founded by the Zaporozhian Cossack Berezan. The territory contained the settlement of Manuylivka (the Ukrainian SSR changed the name to Vorontsovka in 1922) which was named after the Cossack settler Manuil.

Until 1786 all three villages belonged to belonged to the Samara Palanka (province) of Zaporizhian Sich. After the liquidation of Zaporizhian Sich by the Russian government of Catherine the Great in 1775, the region was admitted into the newly formed Novomoskovsk county of Yekaterinoslav Governorate. The territory on the left bank of Dnieper across Yekaterinoslav at interfluvial region between Dnieper and Samara was known locally as Zadniprovia (Trans-Dnieper region).

The village of Amur emerged in 1875 and contained various factories. To the east of Amur there was a village Baraf which was merged with Amur to form an industrial small city named Amur-Nyzhnodniprovskyi (Nyzhnodniprovskyi meaning "Lower Dnieper"). After a railway was laid in the area in 1895/1897 the area became heavy industrial. In September 1917 all settlements of Zadniprovia were organized into a district of Zadniprovskyi Raion. On 25 January 1918 the district was renamed into Amur-Nyzhnodniprovskyi.

In World War II the area saw heavy fighting during the June 1941 phase of Operation Barbarossa.

In 1969 the district was split in half and at its eastern and northern portions was created the Industrialnyi District. From the late 1970s until the mid 1980s the district was greatly expanded.

In the night of 22–23 February 2024 a Russian attack with a Shahed drone (as part of the Russian missile attacks on Dnipro of the Russian invasion of Ukraine) hit a high-rise residential building in the district, killing two people.

On 29 July 2024, Amur-Nyzhnodniprovskyi District was renamed to Nyzhnodniprovskyi District as part of the derussification campaign, as its name was associated with the Amur River in Russia. However, on 18 December 2024, the Dnipro City Council returned the district its former name, as there is no direct evidence that the name of the Amur neighborhood is derived from the Amur River.

== Population ==
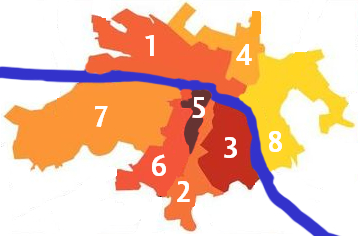
1. Amur-Nyzhnodniprovskyi District; 2. Shevchenkivskyi District; 3. Sobornyi District; 4. Industrialnyi District; 5. Tsentralnyi District; 6. Chechelivskyi District; 7. Novokodatskyi District; 8. Samarskyi District

=== Language ===
Distribution of the population by native language according to the 2001 census:

Language	Number	Percentage
Ukrainian	84 283	52.64%
Russian	74 570	46.57%
Other^{[a]}	1 270	0.79%
Total	160 123	100.00%

^{a} Those who did not indicate their native language or indicated a language that was native to less than 1% of the local population.

== Neighborhoods ==
- Amur
- Nyzhnodniprovsk
- Manuilivka
- Sakhalin
- Sultanivka
- Soniachnyi
- Kalynovskyi
- Borzhom
- Kamianka
- Lomivka
- Livoberezhnyi
- Berezanivka

== Gallery ==
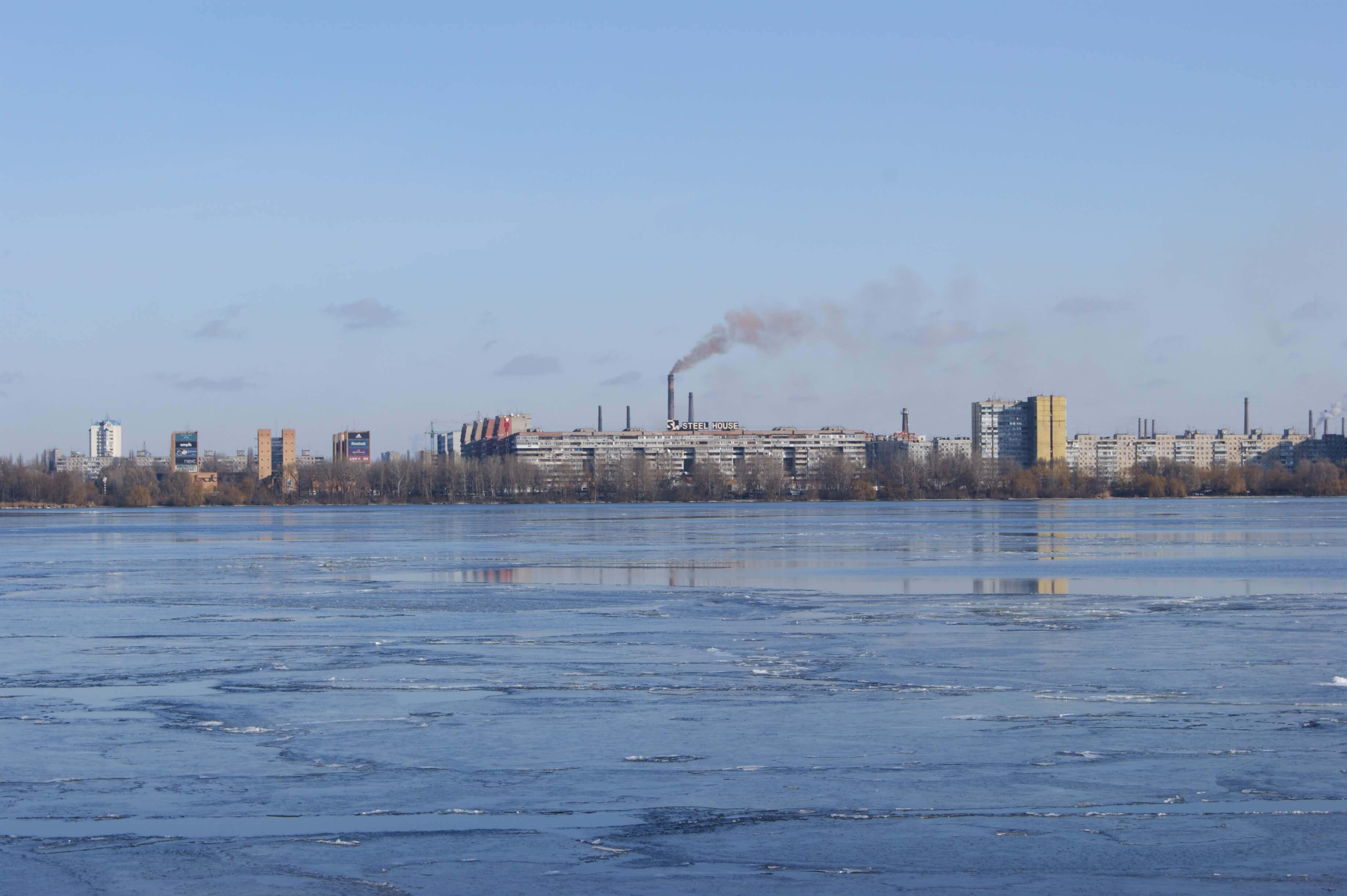
A panoramic view of the Amur-Nyzhnodniprovskyi District

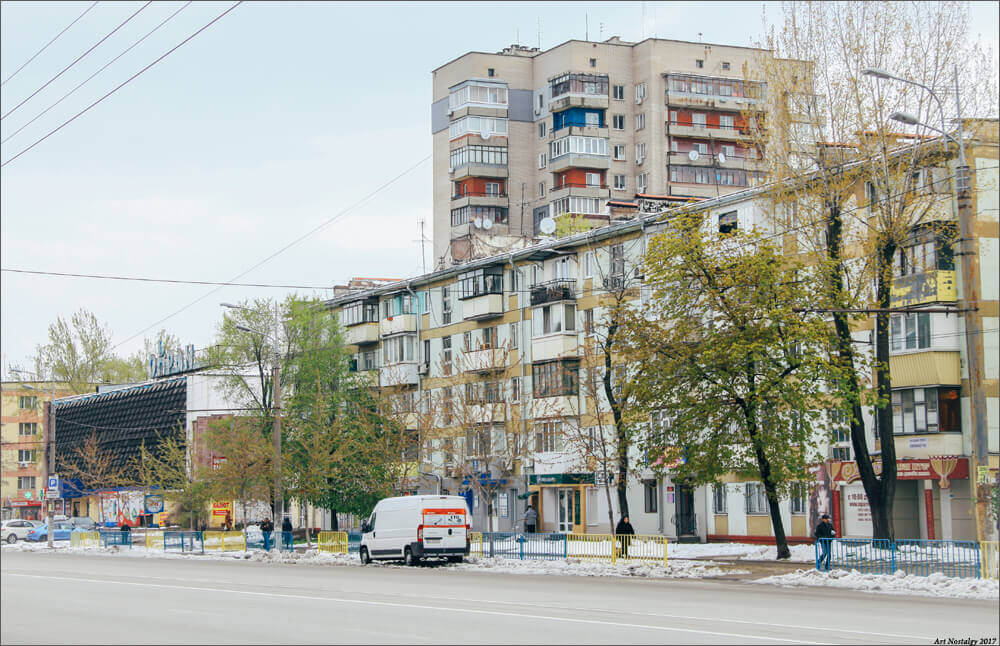
The Amur-Nyzhnodniprovskyi District's Slobozhanskyi Avenue

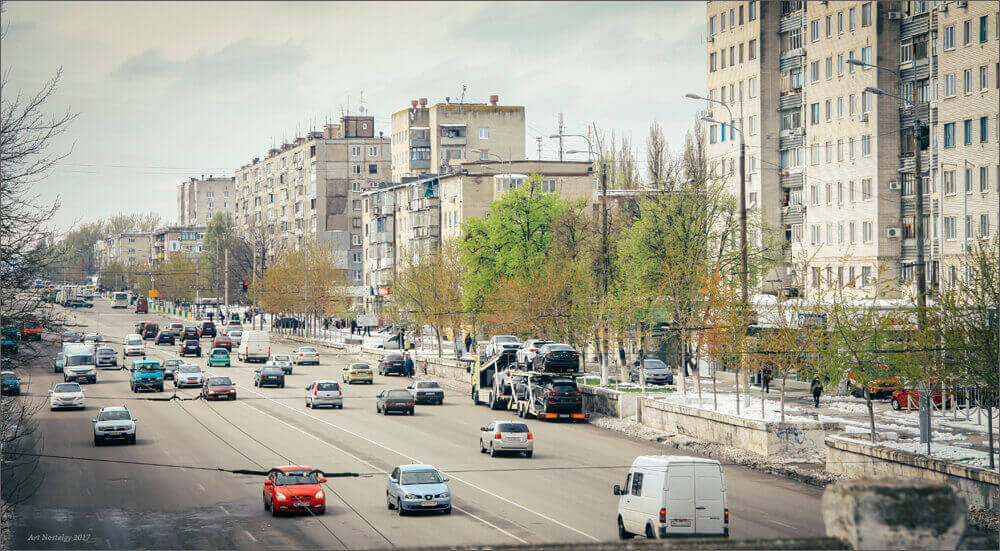
The Amur-Nyzhnodniprovskyi District's Slobozhanskyi Avenue

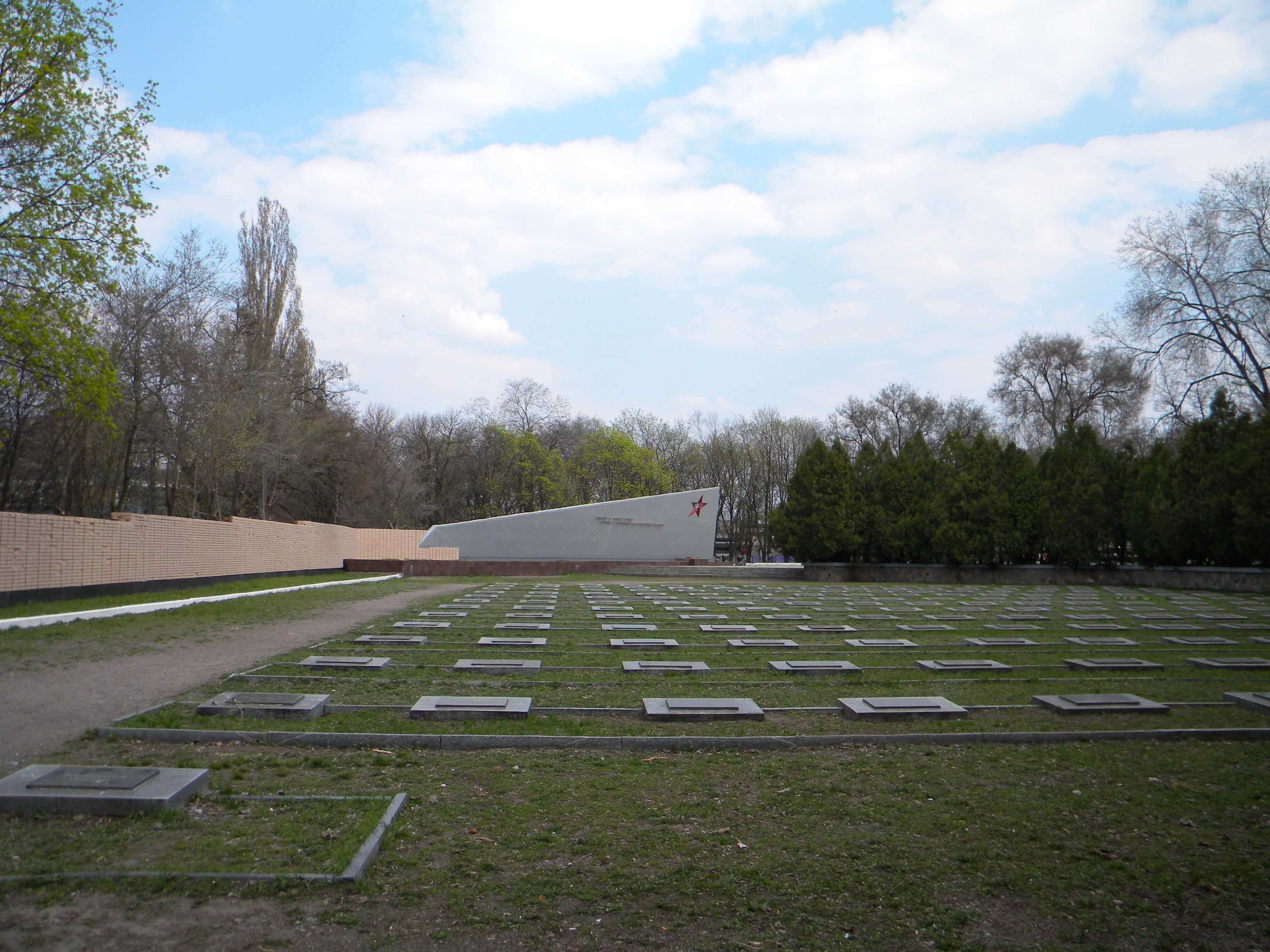
Soviet military cemetery
