= Dniprovsky Metallurgical Plant =

Ukrainian private joint-stock company

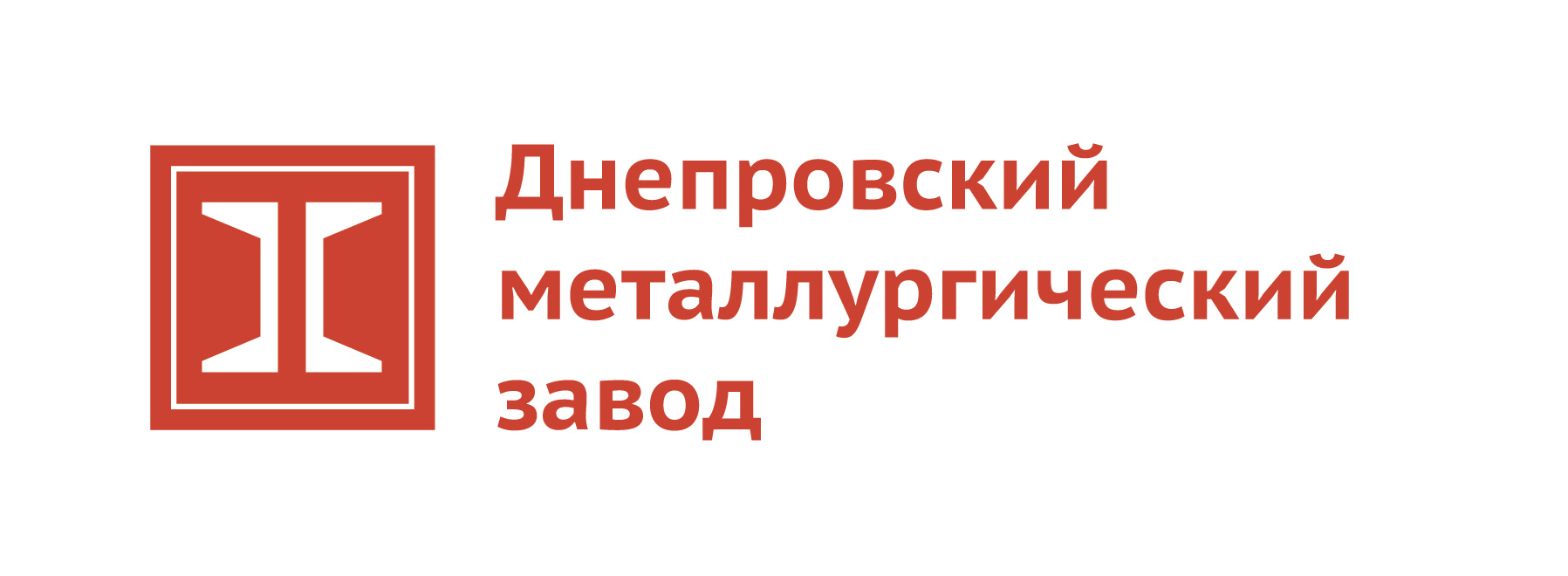
- Native name: Дніпровський металургійний завод
- Type: PJSC
- Industry: Ferrous metallurgy
- Founded: 1885
- Headquarters: 49064, Dnipro, Mayakovsky Street, 3, Ukraine
- Revenue: 1,664,980,000 hryvnia (2025)
- Total assets: 6,073,539,000 hryvnia (2025)
- Number of employees: 4472 (2017)

Dniprovsky Metallurgical Plant or Dnipro Metallurgical Plant (Ukrainian: Дніпровський металургійний завод) is a private joint-stock company, and the oldest metallurgical enterprise in the city of Dnipro. It is located in the Novokodatskyi District, in Dnipro Raion. It was founded in 1885.

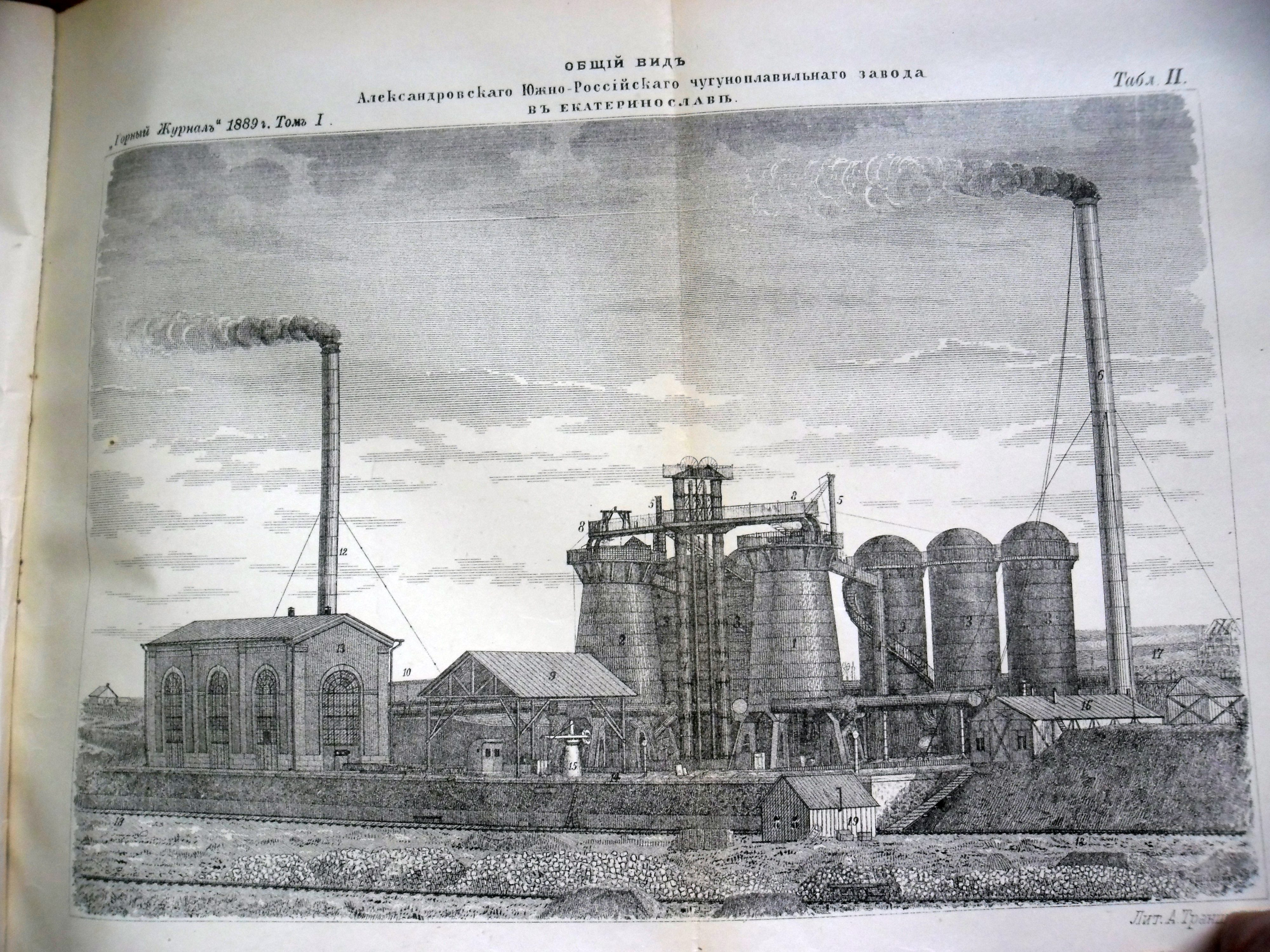
The plant depicted in 1889.

== History ==
Until 1917, the plant was called the Alexander Southern Russian Ironworks and Rolling Mill of the Bryansk Joint-Stock Company. The plant was named after Emperor Alexander III. Later the plant was known as the Bryansk Plant. From 1922 until the time of decommunization in Ukraine, the plant was named after the Bolshevik figure Hryhoriy Petrovsky.

In 2010, Evraz merged the JSC "Dniprokoks" into Dniprovsky Metallurgical Plant to make a single enterprise, with Dniprokoks acting as a structural division in the business of coke. The combined enterprise was named "Evraz - Dnipropetrovsk Metallurgical Plant named after Petrovsky" under Evraz. In March 2019, DCH Steel was formed as a corporate structure to link the plant with the Sukha Balka mine, and eventually move the two towards a vertically integrated supply chain. Following the formation, DCH invested 300 million USD into the plant and did a major overhaul of the blast furnace. There were future plans announced also to construct a Continuous Casting Machine for the plant and link it to a new Sinter plant.

== Products and destinations ==
The main products are square billets (supplied to Egypt) and structural channel beams which have a wide export geography (supplied to European, Asian, and African countries).

== Owernship ==
In September 2008, the plant was acquired by Evraz Group S.A., who obtained 95.57% of the shares of the plant from the Cypriot holding company Palmrose Limited in exchange for new Evraz group shares being issued to Lanebrook Limited. Prior to this, it was part of Privat Group's holdings under Ihor Kolomoisky. In March 2018, DCH under Oleksandr Yaroslavskyi acquired the plant.
