= Sobornyi District, Dnipro =

Sobornyi District Соборний район
- Urban district
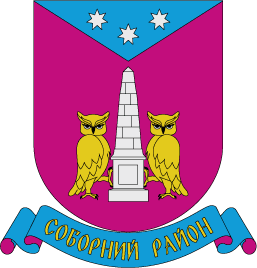
- Coat of arms
- Interactive map of Sobornyi District
- Coordinates: 48°27′00″N 35°04′00″E
- Country: Ukraine
- City: Dnipro
- Established: 16 March 1936

Government
  - Chairman of District Council: Anton Zhosul

Area
  - Total: 44.093 km^{2} (17.024 sq mi)

Population (2001 census)
  - Total: 167,645
  - Density: 3,802.1/km^{2} (9,847.3/sq mi)
- Time zone: UTC+2 (EET)
  - Summer (DST): UTC+3 (EEST)
- Area code: +380 562
- KOATUU: 1210136900
- Website: sobornarada.gov.ua/uk/

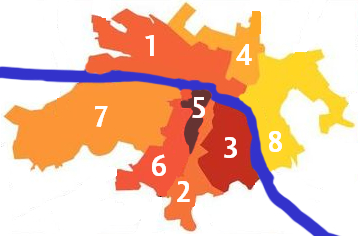
1. Amur-Nyzhnodniprovskyi District; 2. Shevchenkivskyi District; 3. Sobornyi District; 4. Industrialnyi District; 5. Tsentralnyi District; 6. Chechelivskyi District; 7. Novokodatskyi District; 8. Samarskyi District

The Sobornyi District (Ukrainian: Соборний район) is an urban district of the city of Dnipro, in southern Ukraine. It is located in the city's center on the right-bank of the Dnieper River.

== History ==
According to archeological finds, in the Paleolithic period (7—3 thousand Anno Domini) human settlements appear on Monastyrskyi Island; which is located in Sobornyi District. Traces of Cimmerian settlements during the Bronze Age have been found near today's Sobornyi District's Taras Shevchenko Park.

The current district Sobornyi District was created on 16 March 1936 out of the Kirovskyi and Fabrychno-Chechelivskyi districts. In 1973, a portion of its territory was annexed to the newly created Babushkinskyi District. Before 26 November 2015 the district was named Zhovtnevyi (Ukrainian: Жовтневий район); on that day the district was renamed to comply with decommunization laws.

On 14 January 2023 a Russian missile destroyed a residential building on Sobornyi District's Naberezhna Peremohy St, 118; killing over 40 people.

== Population ==
=== Language ===
Distribution of the population by native language according to the 2001 census:

Language	Number	Percentage
Ukrainian	66 009	39.37%
Russian	99 665	59.45%
Other^{[a]}	1 971	1.18%
Total	167 645	100.00%

^{a} Those who did not indicate their native language or indicated a language that was native to less than 1% of the local population.

== Neighborhoods ==
- Nahirny
- Laherny
- Vuzivsky
- Mandrykivka
- Lotskamianka
- Peremoha
- Sokil

== Gallery ==
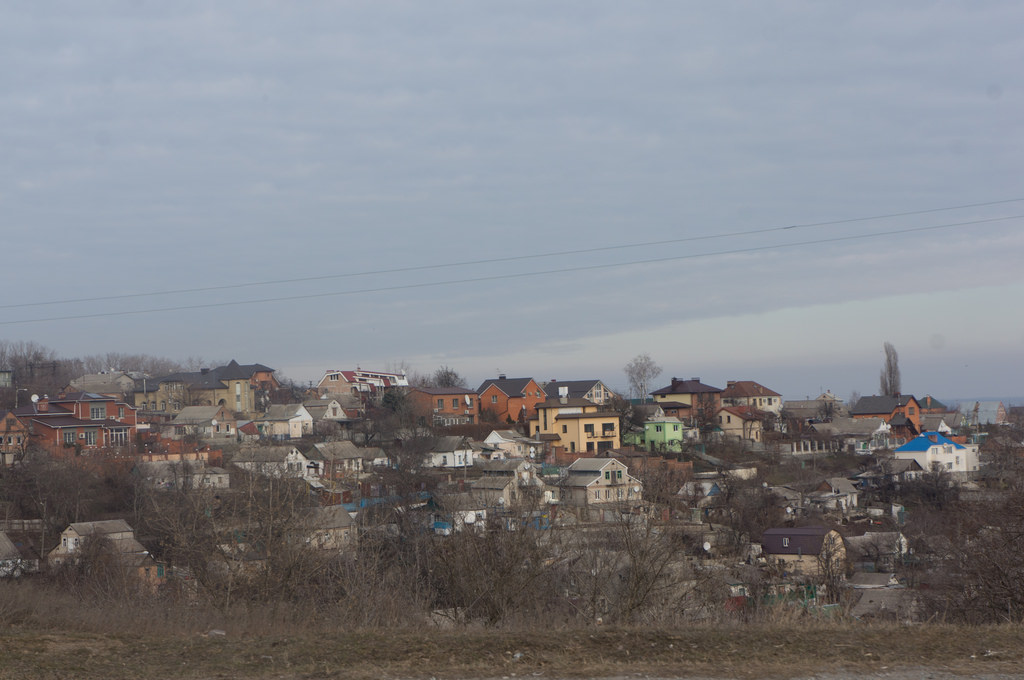
View of a part of Sobornyi District

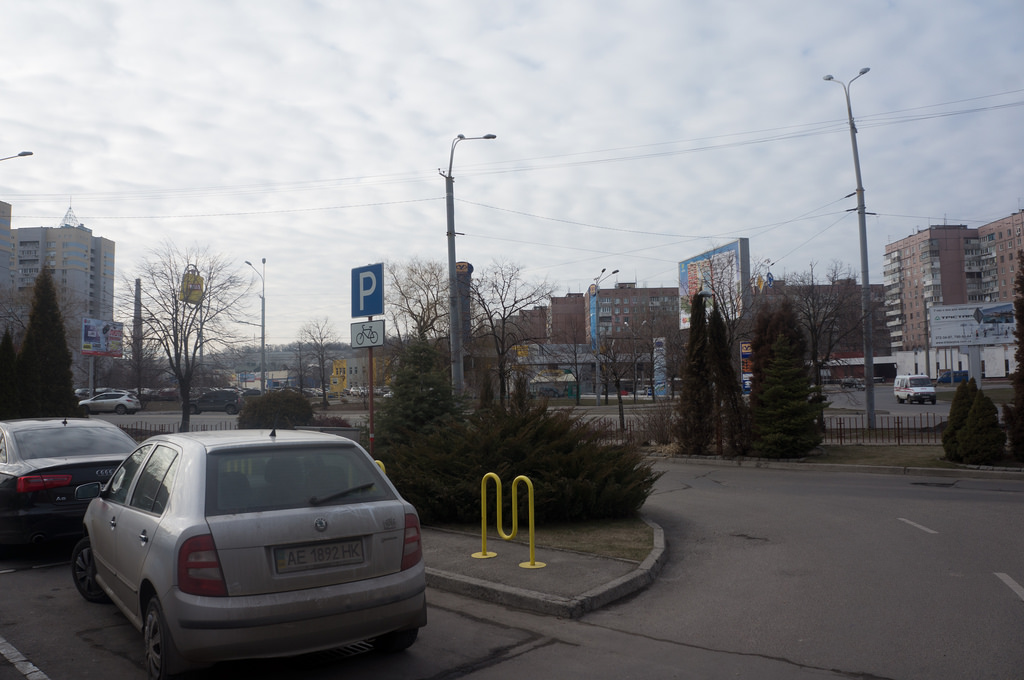
Peremoha microdistrict is a part of Sobornyi District

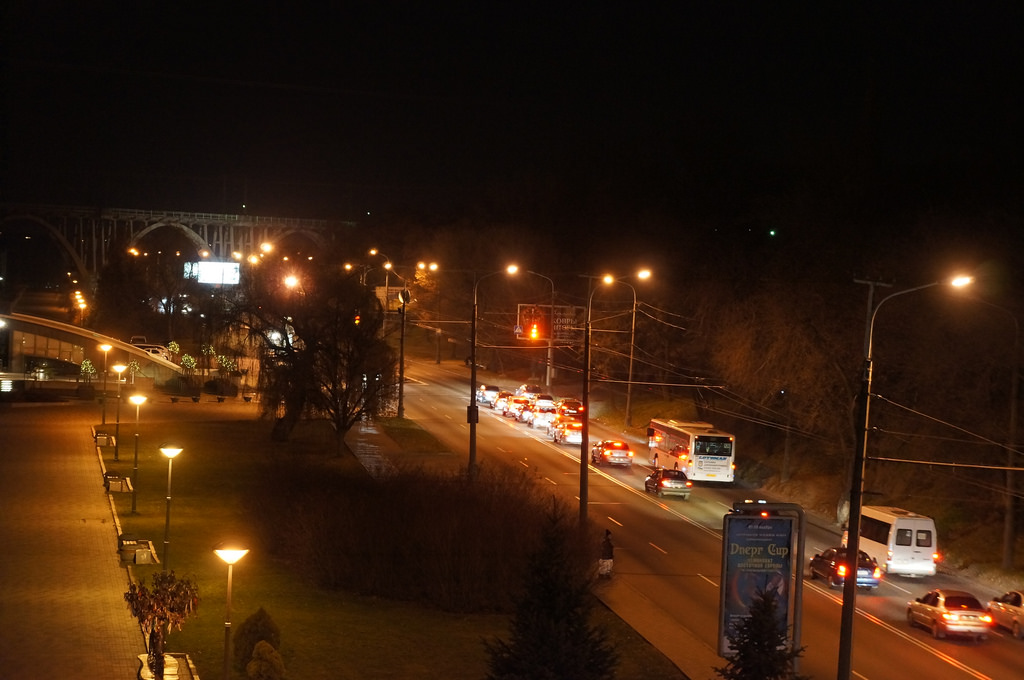
Sicheslav Embankment in Sobornyi district, Dnipro

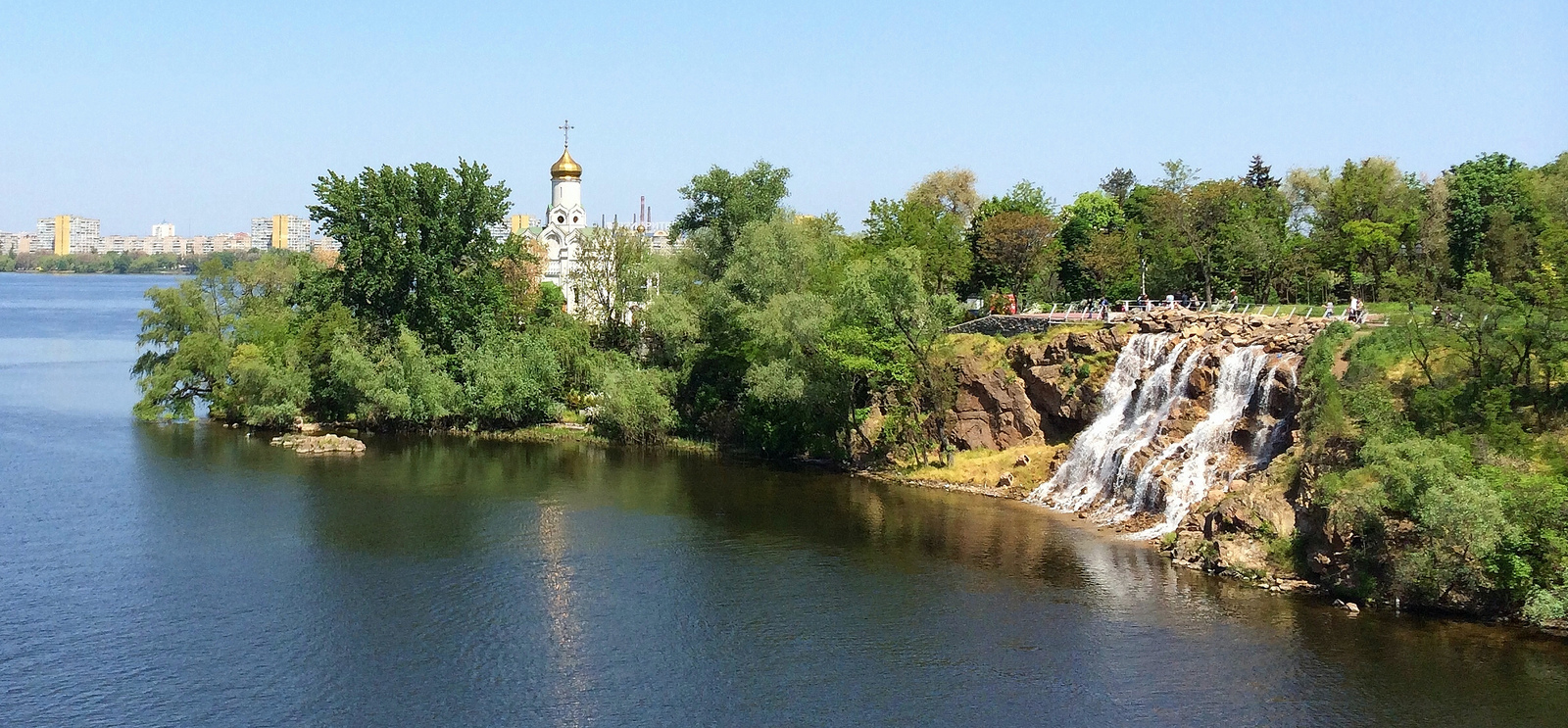
Monastyrskyi Island with a church and steep cliffs

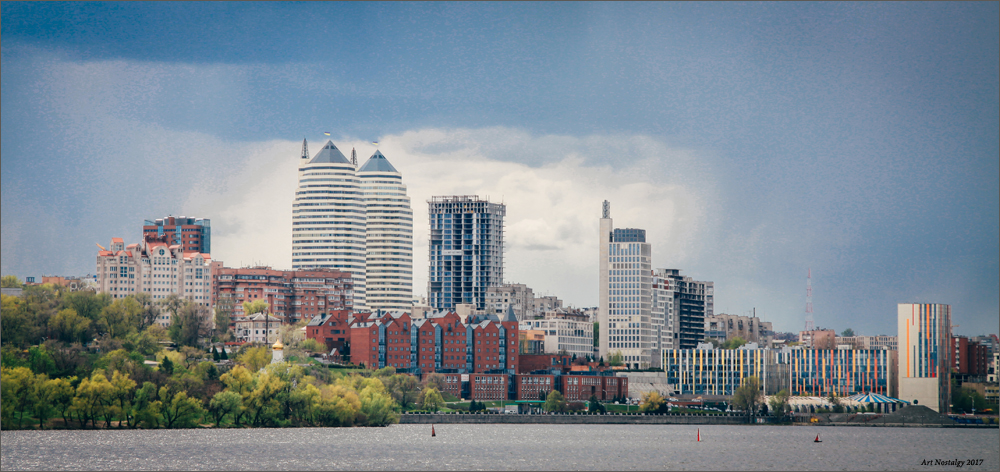
Panorama view of Nahirniy neighbourhood

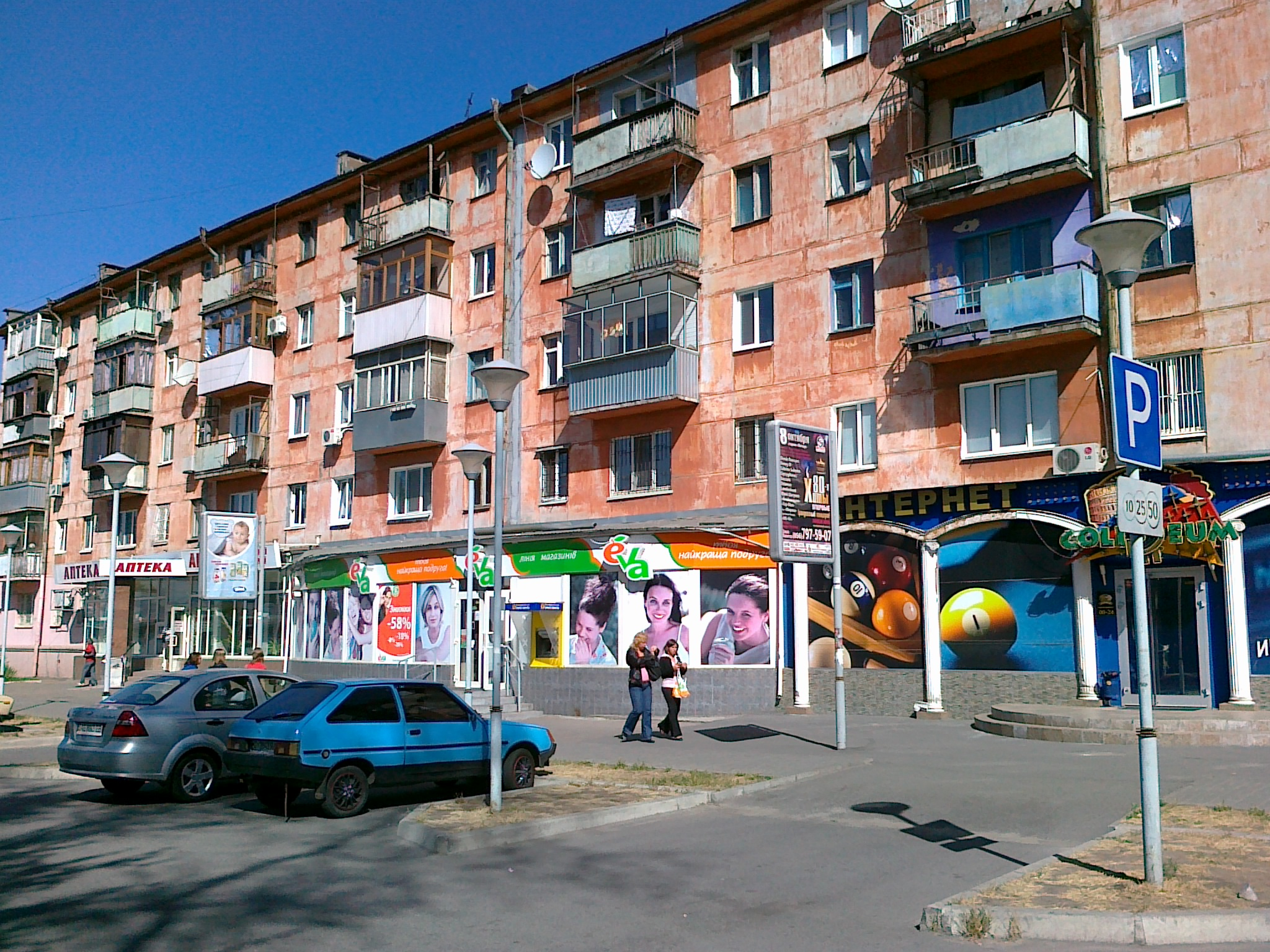
Khrushchyovkas Science Avenue (formerly Gagarin Avenue)

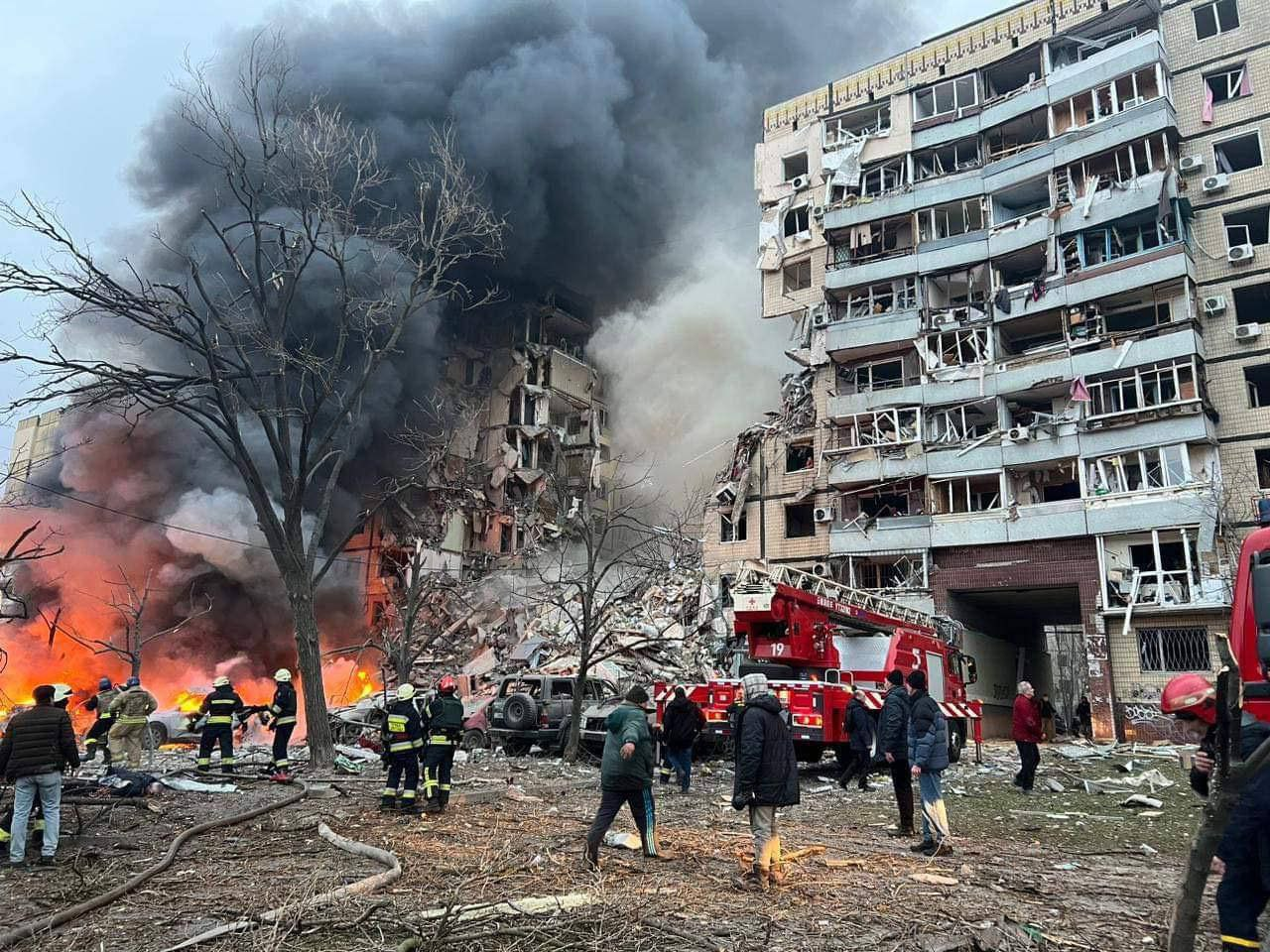
Firefighters putting out a fire at a residential building on Sobornyi District's Naberezhna Peremohy St, 118, on 14 January 2023 after it was destroyed by a Russian Kh-22 missile
