= Industrialnyi District, Dnipro =

Industrialnyi District Індустріальний район
- Urban district
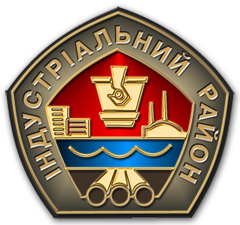
- Coat of arms
- Interactive map of Industrialnyi District
- Coordinates: 48°31′00″N 35°05′00″E
- Country: Ukraine
- City: Dnipro
- Established: 23 May 1969

Government
  - Chairman of District Council: Yuriy Dehtyarov

Area
  - Total: 33.033 km^{2} (12.754 sq mi)

Population (2001 census)
  - Total: 134,425
  - Density: 4,069.4/km^{2} (10,540/sq mi)
- Time zone: UTC+2 (EET)
  - Summer (DST): UTC+3 (EEST)
- Area code: +380 562
- KOATUU: 1210137200
- Website: www.rada-industrial.dp.ua

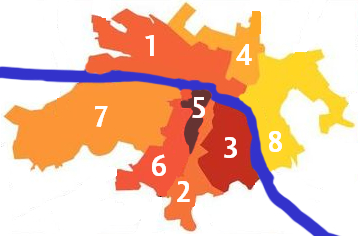
1. Amur-Nyzhnodniprovskyi District; 2. Shevchenkivskyi District; 3. Sobornyi District; 4. Industrialnyi District; 5. Tsentralnyi District; 6. Chechelivskyi District; 7. Novokodatskyi District; 8. Samarskyi District

The Industrialnyi District (Ukrainian: Індустріальний район) is an urban district of the city of Dnipro, in southern Ukraine. It is located at the northern portion of the city on the left-bank of Dnieper River along with the city's Amur-Nyzhnodniprovskyi and Samarskyi districts.

== History ==
In the 18th century, the area was inhabited by several villages, including one colony of German settlers called "Josefstad".

Since the 1950s the area has been expanded by industry and housing complexes. In the 1960s this led to the need to make the area a new urban district. The Industrialnyi District was created on 23 May 1969 by splitting away the eastern and northern parts of the Amur-Nyzhnodniprovskyi District that predominantly contain areas of heavy industry.

In 1977 the eastern outskirts of the Industrialnyi District along the Samara River were transferred to the newly formed Samarskyi District. The major factory of the district is the Nyzhnodniprovsk Pipe-rolling Factory that is owned by the Ukrainian Interpipe Group.

== Population ==
=== Language ===
Distribution of the population by native language according to the 2001 census:

Language	Number	Percentage
Ukrainian	56 531	42.05%
Russian	76 892	57.20%
Other^{[a]}	1 002	0.75%
Total	134 425	100.00%

^{a} Those who did not indicate their native language or indicated a language that was native to less than 1% of the local population.

== Neighborhoods ==
- Kalynivskyi
- Livoberezhnyi
- Samarivka
