= Tsentralnyi District, Dnipro =

Tsentralnyi District Центральний район
- Urban district
- Interactive map of Tsentralnyi District
- Coordinates: 48°28′00″N 35°02′00″E
- Country: Ukraine
- City: Dnipro
- Established: 1932

Area
  - Total: 10.403 km^{2} (4.017 sq mi)

Population (2001 census)
  - Total: 71,115
  - Density: 6,836.0/km^{2} (17,705/sq mi)
- Time zone: UTC+2 (EET)
  - Summer (DST): UTC+3 (EEST)
- Area code: +380 562
- KOATUU: 1210137500

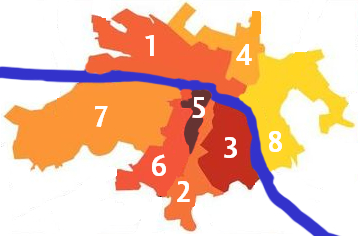
1. Amur-Nyzhnodniprovskyi District; 2. Shevchenkivskyi District; 3. Sobornyi District; 4. Industrialnyi District; 5. Tsentralnyi District; 6. Chechelivskyi District; 7. Novokodatskyi District; 8. Samarskyi District

The Tsentralnyi District (Ukrainian: Центральний район) is an urban district of the city of Dnipro, in southern Ukraine. It is located in the city's center and on the right-bank of the Dnieper River.

== History ==
The district was created in 1932 as the Tsentralnyi Nahornyi District. on 2 December 1934, after the death of Sergei Kirov, it was renamed as the Kirovskyi District. In 1936 the eastern part of district became the Zhovtnevyi District. In 1973 more territories of the Kirovskyi District were passed to the newly formed Babushkinskyi District. The district gained its current name, Tsentralnyi District, on 27 November 2015 when it was renamed as part of Ukraine's decommunization campaign.

== Population ==
=== Language ===
Distribution of the population by native language according to the 2001 census:

Language	Number	Percentage
Ukrainian	26 332	37.03%
Russian	43 988	61.85%
Other^{[a]}	795	1.12%
Total	71 115	100.00%

^{a} Those who did not indicate their native language or indicated a language that was native to less than 1% of the local population.

== Gallery ==
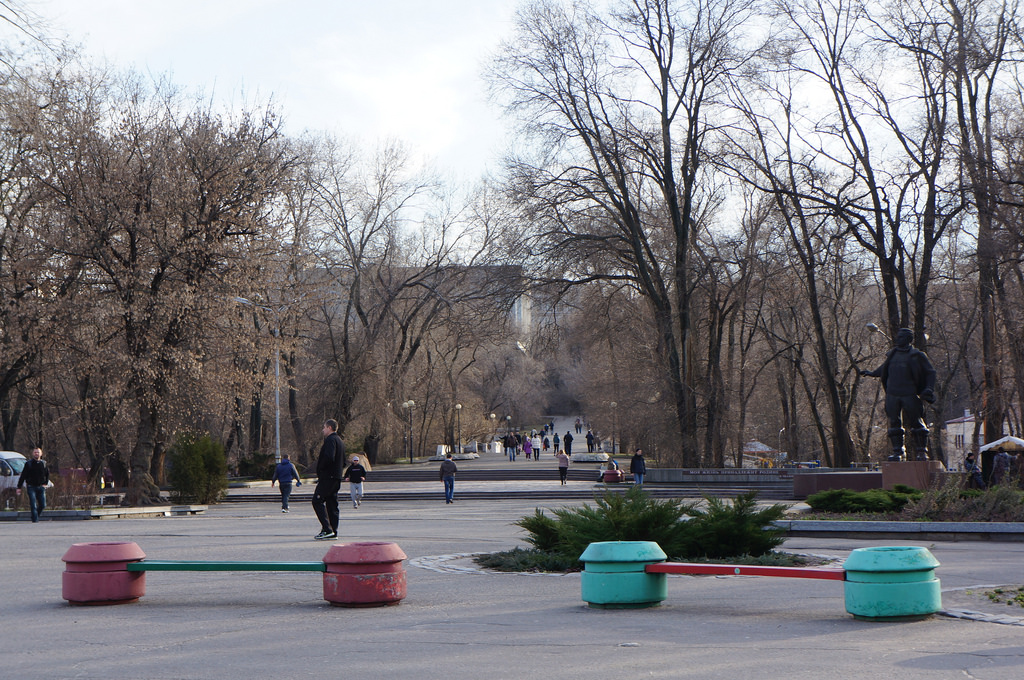
Lazar Hloba Park in Tsentralnyi District

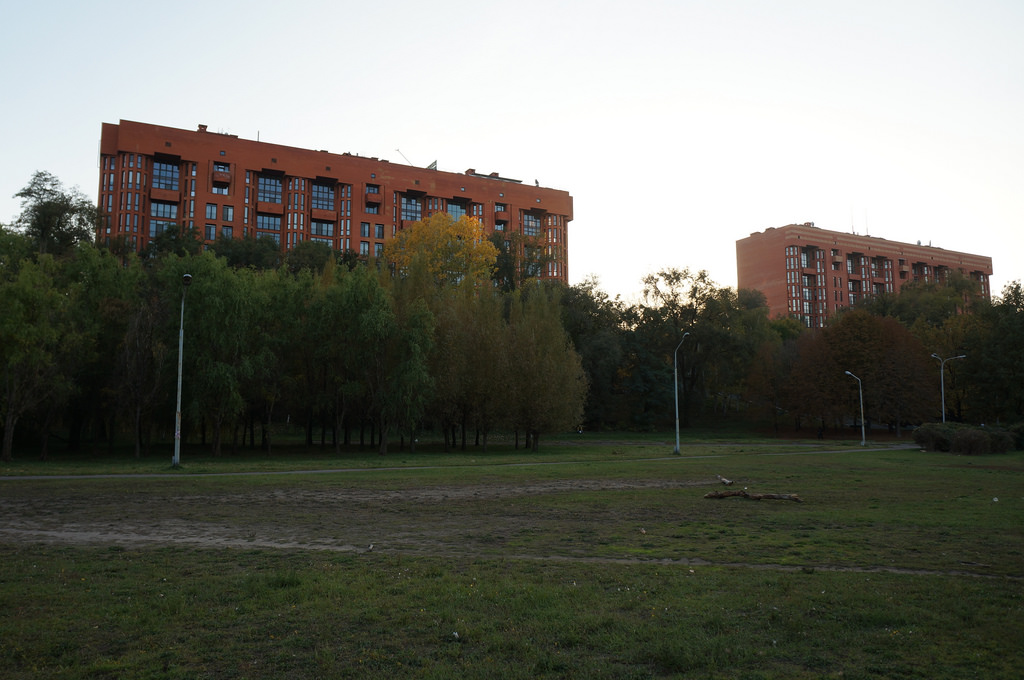
Modern buildings in central part of Dnipro

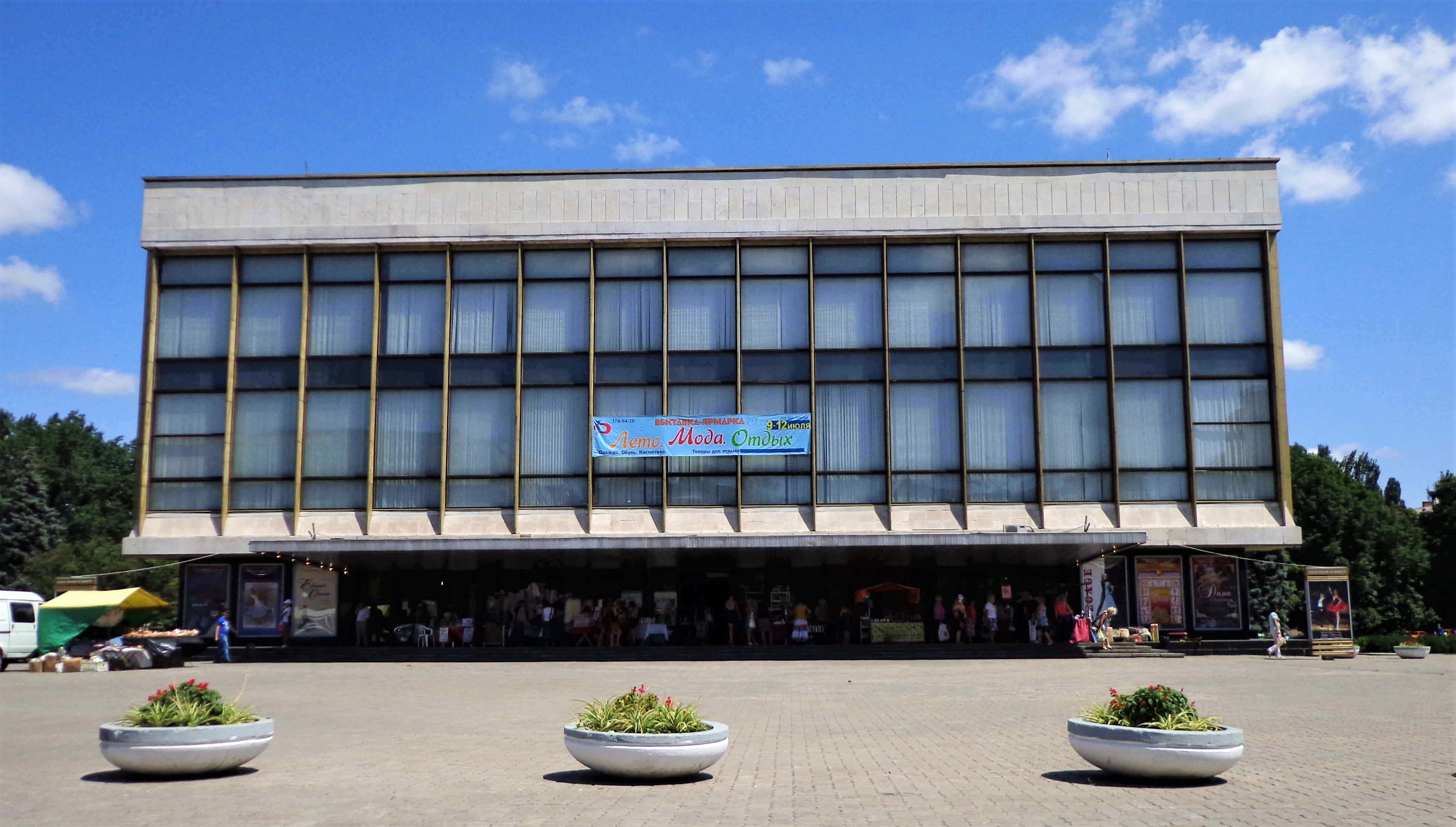
National academic Theatre of opera and ballet

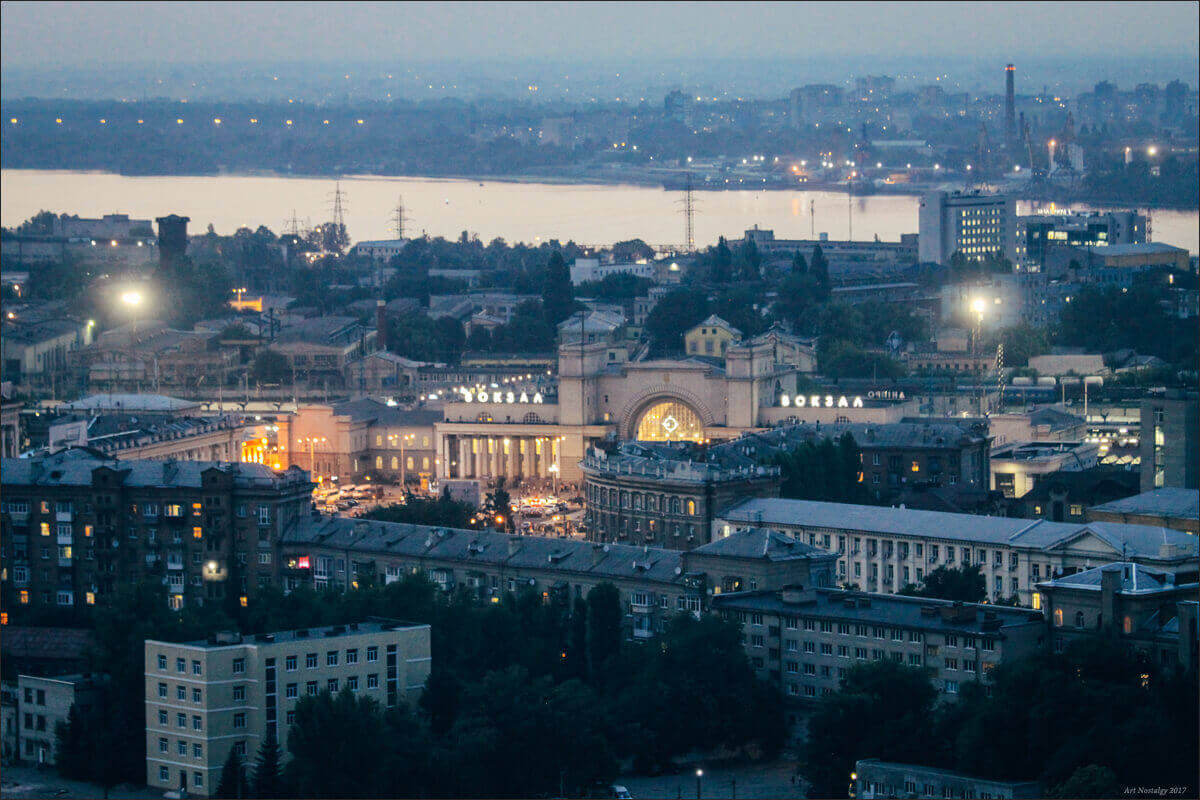
Dnipro railway station and surrounding buildings

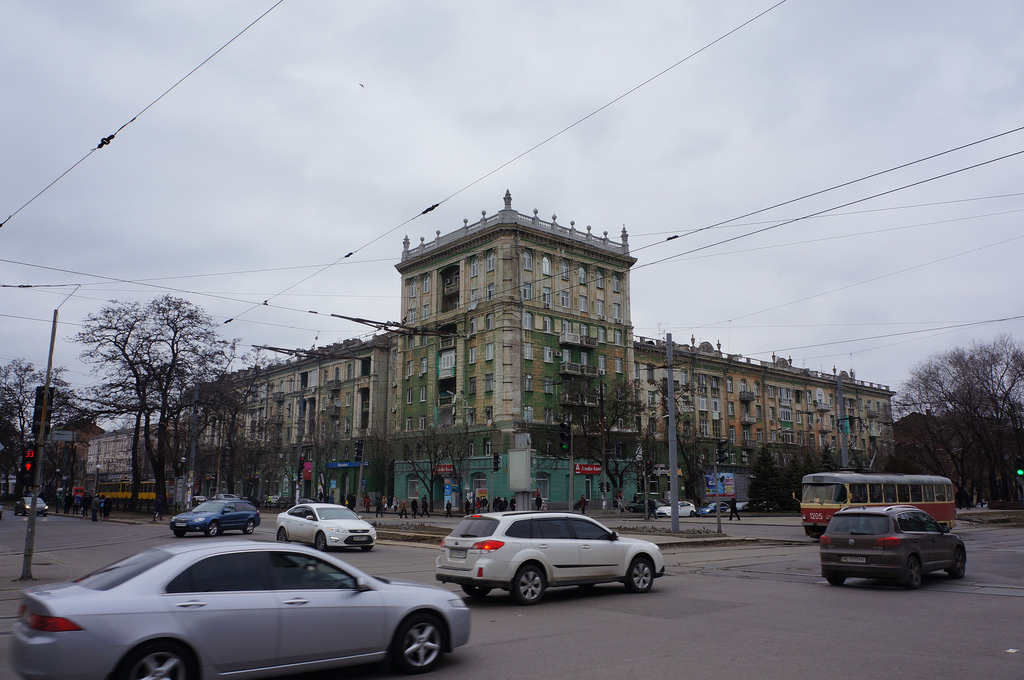
Stalinist architecture on the Dmytro Yavornytsky Avenue
