= 2023 Dnipro residential building airstrike =

14 January 2023 missile strike during the Russian invasion of Ukraine

- Part of the Dnipro missile strikes and the Russian strikes against Ukrainian infrastructure
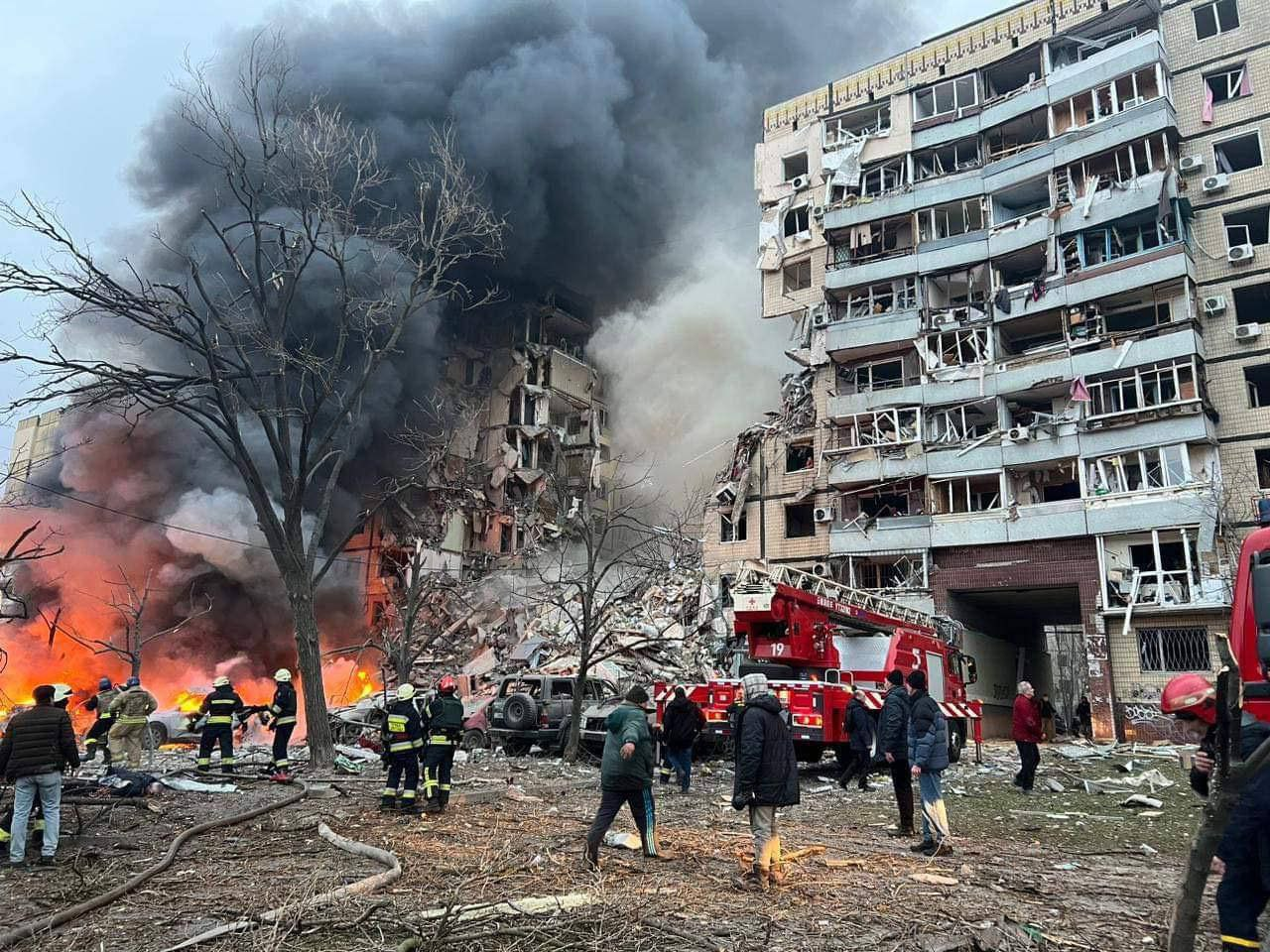
- Firefighters putting out a fire at a residential building in Dnipro on January 14 after it was destroyed by a Kh-22 missile
- Location: 48°25′09″N 35°04′04″E; Sobornyi District, Dnipro, Ukraine
- Date: 14 January 2023 about 3:30 p.m.
- Attack type: Missile strikes
- Weapon: Kh-22
- Deaths: ≥46 (including 6 children)
- Injuries: 80
- Perpetrator: Russian Armed Forces

On 14 January 2023 at about 3:30 p.m., a Russian Kh-22 missile struck a nine-story residential building in Dnipro, Ukraine, on Naberezhna Peremohy St, 118, Sobornyi District in the right-bank part of the city, destroying one entrance and 236 apartments. On 19 January the official casualty rate was stated as 46 people killed (including 6 children) and 80 injured (12 in critical condition) and 11 people reported missing. 14 children were reported injured, and 39 inhabitants were rescued. The destruction left about 400 people homeless. The strike was part of months-long campaign of Russian strikes on Ukrainian civilians and civilian infrastructure that also had hit Dnipro.

This strike was the deadliest Russian attack on a residential building in Ukraine in the previous six months. three days of mourning was declared in Dnipro.

== Timeline ==
Aftermath of the attack

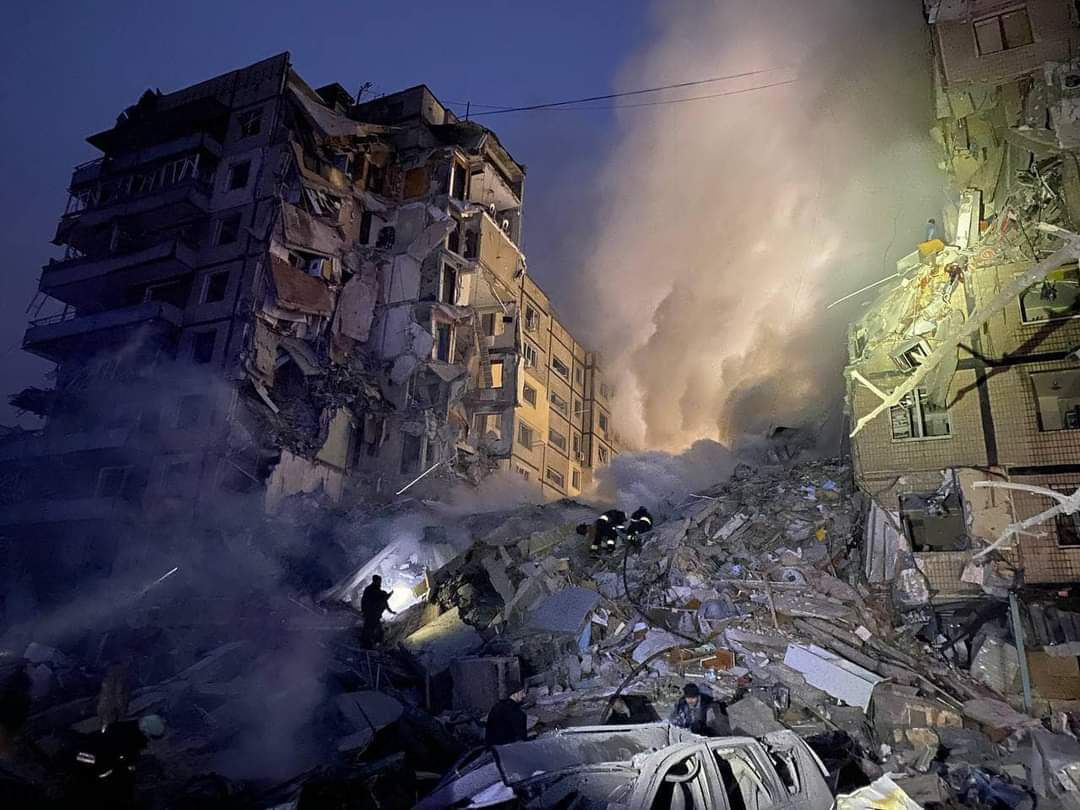
View of the building at night.

A local air alert began at 2:00 p.m. Ukrainian Air Defence Forces claimed it shot down 6 of 8 missiles over Dnipropetrovsk Oblast. An explosion was heard at approximately 3:41 p.m., when a Kh-22 missile hit a multi-storey building at Naberezhna Peremohy St, 118, Sobornyi District, Dnipro. At the moment, Ukraine does not have air defense systems to intercept such Kh-22 missiles. From the start of the February 2022 Russian invasion of Ukraine (already) 210 rockets of this type had been fired on Ukraine with none being shot down by air defenses.

Initially, it was reported that the attack had killed 20 people (including a 15-year-old girl) and injured 73 (including 14 children; the youngest three years old; a 9-year-old girl was reported to be in serious condition). Nothing was known about the fate of another 26 people. A 23-year-old woman, who was in a state of shock in the bathroom on the seventh floor, survived the attack but lost her parents.

On 15 January the State Emergency Service of Ukraine reported that a Russian missile strike on the building had killed 23 people. By 1:15 p.m. (the next day) 43 reports of missing persons had been received, 72 people sustained injuries, including 13 children, and 39 were rescued. In the afternoon of 15 January Ukrainian President Volodymyr Zelenskyy on Telegram expressed his condolences to the families of 25 people who were killed in the attack. In the morning of 16 January Governor of Dnipropetrovsk Oblast Valentyn Reznichenko updated the death toll to 35 people, including two children. 39 people had been rescued and 75 wounded, 14 of these being children. 35 building residents continued to be missing. The destruction of the building left about 400 people homeless. 236 apartments were destroyed. The search and rescue operation was called off on Tuesday 17, when the death toll stood at 44 including five children. 79 people had been injured and 39 rescued.

Among the victims was Mykhailo Korenovsky, the head coach of Dnipropetrovsk Oblast boxing team.

== Weapon ==
The missile that struck the building was a Kh-22 anti-ship missile, the same type used in an attack on a shopping center in Kremenchuk on 27 June 2022. Ukrainian Air Force Commander, Lieutenant General Mykola Oleschuk, said that the Ukrainian army at the time of the incident had no weapons to shoot down such missiles and that during the year of full-scale war, out of 210 Kh-22 missiles launched in Ukraine, not a single one was shot down. Oleshchuk called earlier reports about the downing of such missiles unreliable and erroneous.

Russia launched five Kh-22 missiles across Ukraine on 14 January.

== Investigation ==
On 15 January 2023, the office of the Prosecutor General of Ukraine stated that the attack could only have been carried out by the 52nd Guards Aviation Regiment based in Shaikivka. The same day, a list of military personnel directly involved in the missile launch was published on the Molfar Global website (OSINT community) in which 44 out of 52 people from the 52nd Guards Aviation Regiment were named. This was the same regiment that struck the Amstor shopping center in Kremenchuk on June 27, 2022.

On 16 January 2023, the Security Service of Ukraine (SBU) confirmed the participation of the military of the 52nd Aviation Regiment of the Russian Federation in the missile attack. It singled out six Russian soldiers in particular.

== Reactions ==
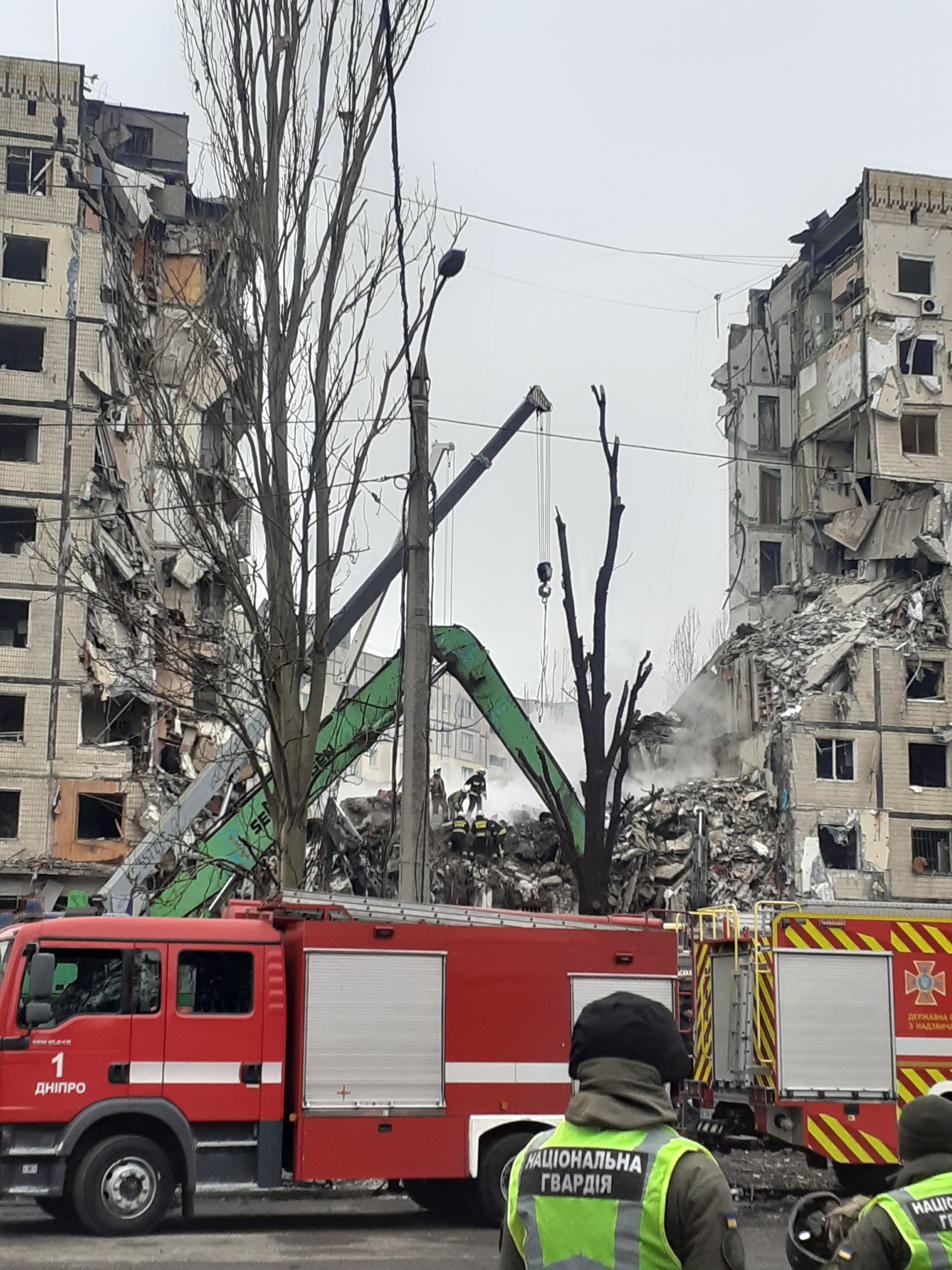
The building next day after the strike

Ukrainian President Volodymyr Zelenskyy said the Russian attack targeted civilian apartment blocks and as a result was a war crime. In his daily evening appeal of 15 January President Zelenskyy addressed the Russian citizens who had not spoken out against Russia's military invasion of Ukraine in Russian stating: "Your cowardly silence, an attempt to ride out what is happening, will end with these same terrorists coming for you one day."

Former Ukrainian presidential adviser Oleksii Arestovych initially stated that Ukrainian air defenses had shot down the Russian missile, causing it to fall and detonate on the building. However, he later retracted his statement and apologized following widespread criticism of his remarks within Ukraine, and resigned from his position as well.

The United Nations called the images coming out from the aftermath of the attack "horrifying".

The French Ministry of Foreign Affairs called the attack a war crime and noted that it indicates Russia's intention to escalate the war.

President of Lithuania Gitanas Nausėda stated that Russia would definitely bear responsibility for attacks on peaceful cities. On January 14 a three-day mourning was declared in Dnipro.

Vladimir Putin's press secretary Dmitry Peskov stated that Russian forces never attack residential buildings and that the residential building had probably collapsed because of a Ukrainian air defense counterattack. The Russian Ministry of Defence meanwhile confirmed their responsibility for other missile strikes in Dnipro.

Dnipro mayor Borys Filatov said that the Russians might have intended to target a nearby thermal power station.

=== Memorials ===
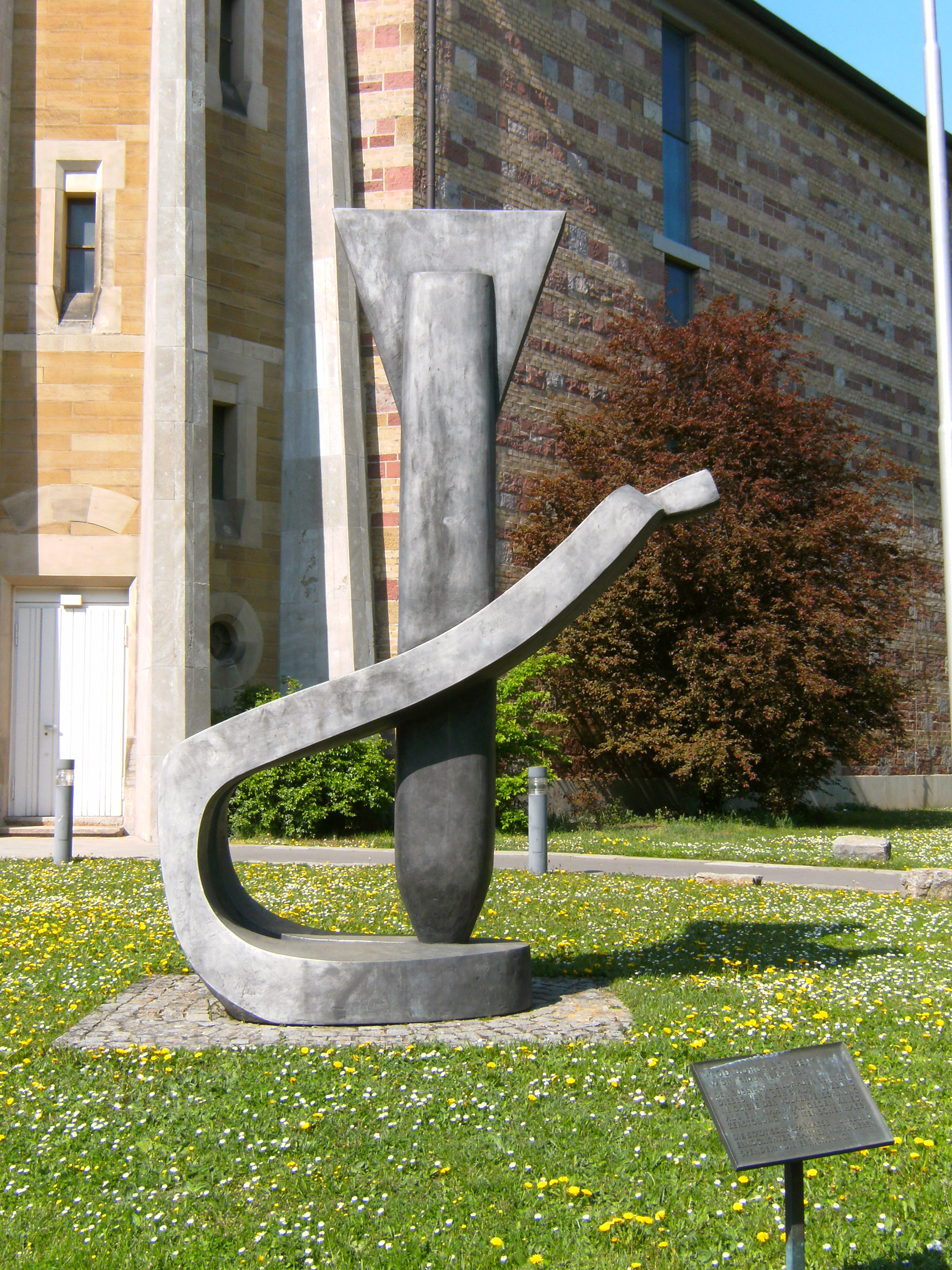
Proposed memorial in Dnipro is based on this memorial in Würzburg, Germany

An impromptu memorial to the victims of the attack appeared in Moscow as people brought flowers to the statue of Lesya Ukrainka. The police detained some of them.

A memorial square is planned to be created as a part of the site of the destroyed building Naberezhna Peremohy St, 118. It is planned that the "Monument to those killed by bombs" will become its central element. This monument is a copy of a sculpture by Vadim Sidur of a figure of a man pierced by a bomb. This sculpture is on display outside the St.-Johannis-Kirche in Würzburg, Germany.

=== Aftermath ===
On 20 October 2024, Dmitry Golenkov, a bomber pilot and chief of staff of Shaykovka air base who was accused of conducting the attack, was found dead in an apple orchard in Bryansk Oblast in an apparent assassination.

== See also ==
- 2022 Zaporizhzhia residential building airstrike
