= Taromske =

Taromske Таромське
- Former urban-type settlement
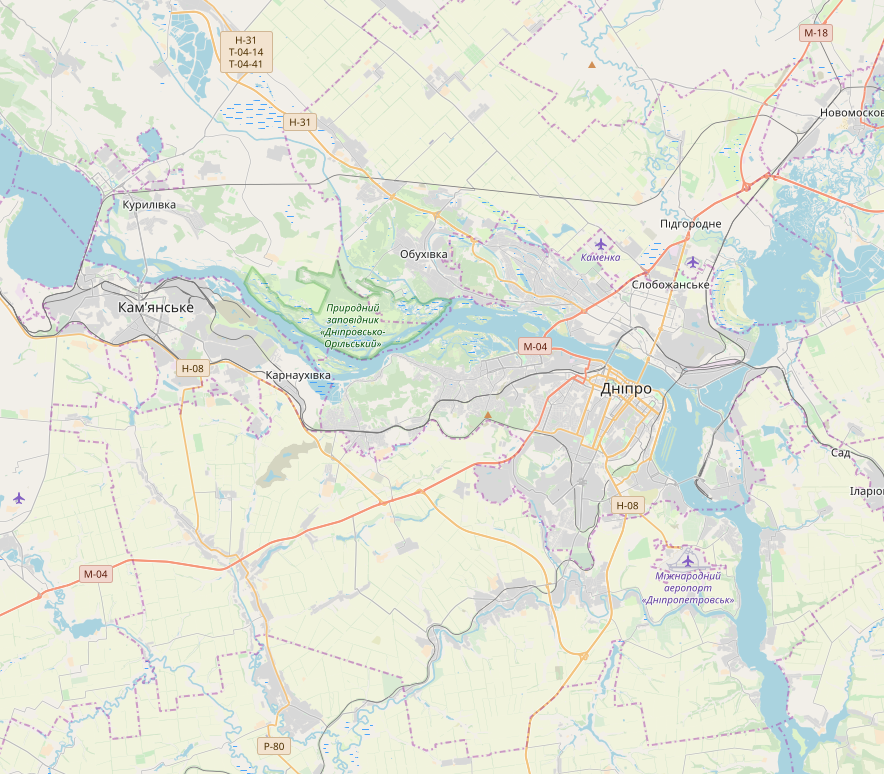
- Location of Taromske within the city of Dnipro Taromske (Ukraine)
- Coordinates: 48°27′42″N 34°46′58″E
- Country: Ukraine
- Municipality: Dnipro Municipality
- Urban district: Novokodatskyi District
- Settlement status: 1938
- Liquidated: September 2001

Area
  - Total: 75 km^{2} (29 sq mi)

Population (2005)
  - Total: 15,500
  - Density: 210/km^{2} (540/sq mi)
- Time zone: UTC+2 (EET)
  - Summer (DST): UTC+3 (EEST)
- Postal code: 69061
- Area code: +380 61

Taromske (Ukrainian: Таромське) is a former urban-type settlement (and constituent unit of its own settlement council) and now a neighborhood of the Novokodatskyi District (urban district) of the Dnipro Municipality in southern Ukraine. Its population was 15,500 in 2005.

== Population ==
=== Language ===
Distribution of the population by native language according to the 2001 census:

Language	Number	Percentage
Ukrainian	14 023	88.47%
Russian	1 738	10.97%
Other^{[a]}	89	0.56%
Total	15 850	100.00%

^{a} Those who did not indicate their native language or indicated a language that was native to less than 1% of the local population.

== History ==
The location of Taromske has been known since 1190 as Tarentsky Rih.

It was settled by Zaporizhian Cossacks at least since 1564. In 1704 Taromske became a town in Kodak Palanka of Zaporizhian Sich. It was located on the historic road from Kyiv to Khortytsia.

In 1764 Taromske was granted a State military status as denizens were exempt from serfdom but had to serve in the Russian military.

In 1885, the populated settlement of Taromske was a village. In 1938, it was given the status of an urban-type settlement. Since 1970, the settlement was included into the boundaries of city of Dnipropetrovsk (present day Dnipro).

From 1992 to 2001, the settlement was an autonomous settlement that was subordinate to the Dnipropetrovsk Municipality. In September 2001, its status of an urban-type settlement was liquidated and it was absorbed into the city's Leninskyi District. On 26 November 2015 Leninskyi District (named after Vladimir Lenin) was renamed to Novokodatskyi District to comply with decommunization laws.
