= Samarskyi District =

Samarskyi District Самарський район
- Urban district
- Interactive map of Samarskyi District
- Coordinates: 48°25′01″N 35°07′04″E
- Country: Ukraine
- City: Dnipro
- Established: 6 April 1977

Area
  - Total: 66.83 km^{2} (25.80 sq mi)

Population (2001 census)
  - Total: 78,997
  - Density: 1,182/km^{2} (3,062/sq mi)
- Time zone: UTC+2 (EET)
  - Summer (DST): UTC+3 (EEST)
- Area code: +380 562
- KOATUU: 1210138400

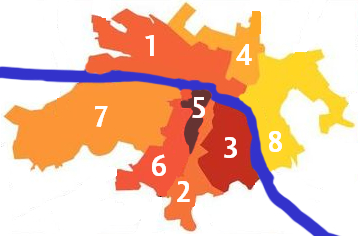
1. Amur-Nyzhnodniprovskyi District; 2. Shevchenkivskyi District; 3. Sobornyi District; 4. Industrialnyi District; 5. Tsentralnyi District; 6. Chechelivskyi District; 7. Novokodatskyi District; 8. Samarskyi District

The Samarskyi District (Ukrainian: Самарський район) is an urban district of the city of Dnipro, in southern Ukraine. It is located at the confluence of the Dnieper and Samara rivers in the eastern and southeastern parts of the city.

== History ==
The district was created on 6 April 1977 out of the neighborhood of Samar previously in the Industrialnyi District and the newly added cities of Prydniprovsk (1956–1977) and Ihren (1959–1977) as well as a historic Cossack settlement of Chapli. Archeologic founds suggest that Samar existed in 1524. Archaeologists of the Dnipro National University have discovered artifacts there dated around 1520s.

The town of Prydniprovsk was created around the Prydniprovsk State District Power Station (DRES), today a thermal power station that was built in 1954, while the town of Ihren was created around the Ihren Rail Station, which still exists since 1873. They were both absorbed into the boundaries of the Samarskyi District.

Samarskyi District did not escape the Russian aerial attacks on Dnipro (of the Russian invasion of Ukraine); a Russian strike in the night of 26 to 27 January 2025 damaged three high-rise residential buildings and industrial buildings in the district. On 25 November 2025 four residential buildings and an educational institution were damaged in a Shahed strike.

== Population ==
=== Language ===
Distribution of the population by native language according to the 2001 census:

Language	Number	Percentage
Ukrainian	40 852	51.71%
Russian	37 543	47.53%
Other^{[a]}	602	0.76%
Total	78 997	100.00%

^{a} Those who did not indicate their native language or indicated a language that was native to less than 1% of the local population.

== Neighborhoods ==
- Chapli
- Ihren
- Kseniivka
- Odynkivka
- Nyzniodniprovsk-Vuzol
- Prydniprovs'k
- Samar
- Shevchenko
- Stara Ihren

== Gallery ==
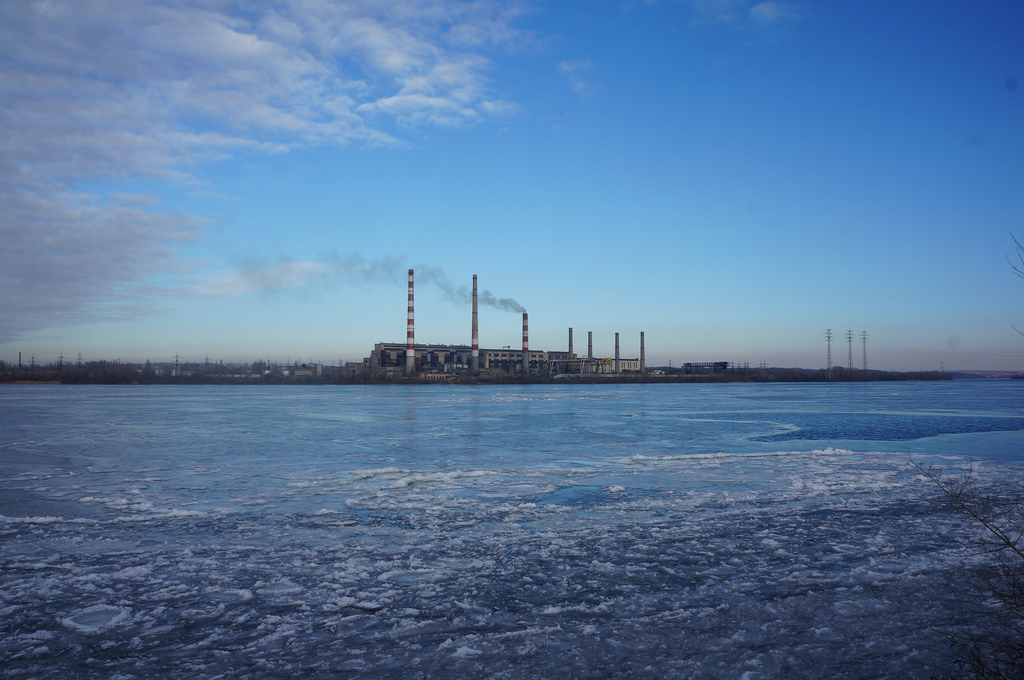
Prydniprovsk Power Plant

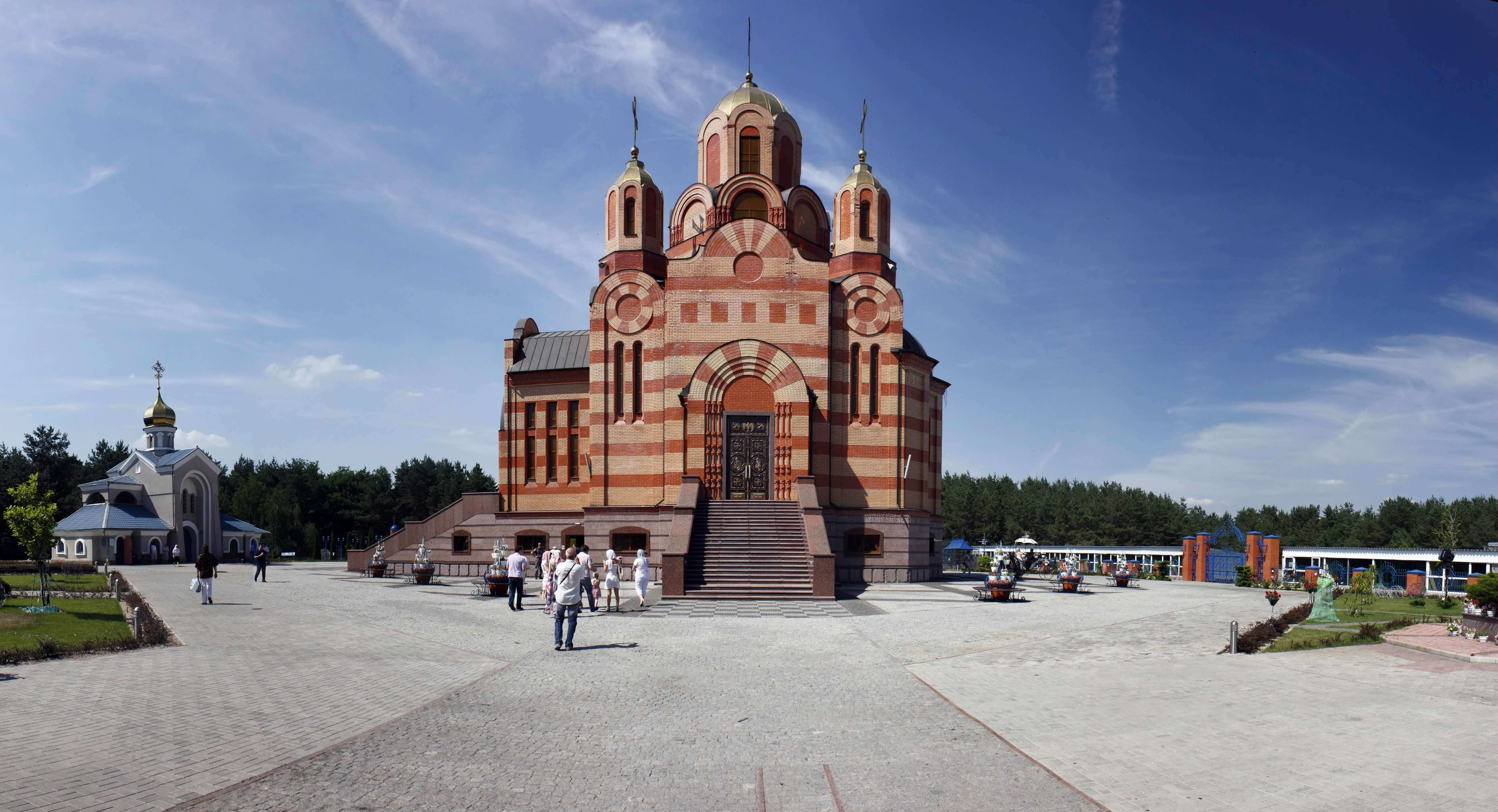
Church

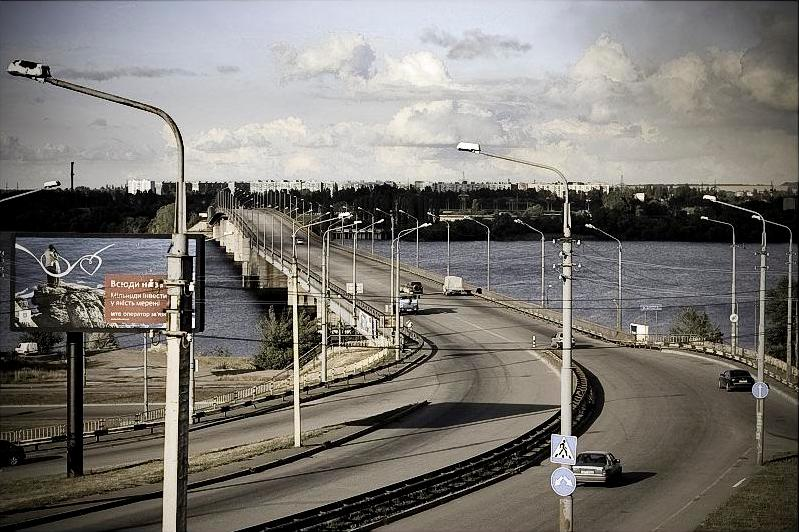
South bridge
