= Novokodatskyi District =

Novokodatskyi District Новокодацький район
- Urban district
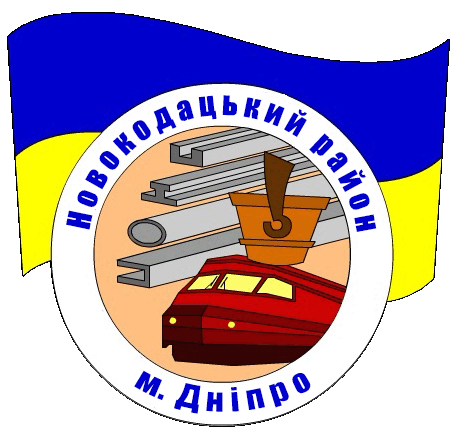
- Coat of arms
- Interactive map of Novokodatskyi District
- Coordinates: 48°28′30″N 34°56′42″E
- Country: Ukraine
- City: Dnipro
- Established: 1920

Government
  - Chairman of District Council: Oleh Denysenko

Area
  - Total: 88.7 km^{2} (34.2 sq mi)

Population (2001 census)
  - Total: 161,026
  - Density: 1,820/km^{2} (4,700/sq mi)
- Time zone: UTC+2 (EET)
  - Summer (DST): UTC+3 (EEST)
- Area code: +380 562
- KOATUU: 1210138100

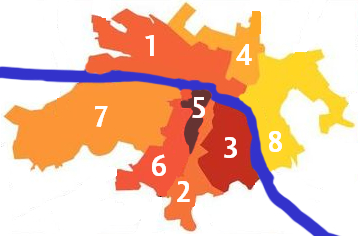
1. Amur-Nyzhnodniprovskyi District; 2. Shevchenkivskyi District; 3. Sobornyi District; 4. Industrialnyi District; 5. Tsentralnyi District; 6. Chechelivskyi District; 7. Novokodatskyi District; 8. Samarskyi District

The Novokodatskyi District (Ukrainian: Новокодацький район) is an urban district of the city of Dnipro, in central Ukraine. It is in the right-bank western part of the city and borders the city of Kamianske.

== History ==
The area of the district includes many former Cossack settlements among which are Diiivka, Novi Kodaky, Sukhachivka and others. Novi Kodaky was founded during the reign of Bohdan Khmelnytsky as Hetman of Zaporizhian Host and was the center of the "Kodak palanquin" of the Zaporozhian Sich. A trade route from Poltava passed through Novi Kodak. At the end of the 19th century the area became the center of the metallurgical industry of what is now Ukraine. The colony of the Bryansk plant was formed to house factory workers. Other settlements for laborers grew together with it: Chechelivka, Shlyakhovka and Fabryka. Near the factories a railway station – Horiayinove, a secondary school for 600 people and hospital were built. In 1928, the Ilyich Palace of Culture was built, and in 1936 the building of the Industrial Technical School was built.

The current district was created in 1940 out of the city's Kodatskyi and Fabrychno-Chechelivskyi districts. In 2006, the old Cossack town of Taromske, which was located between former Dnipropetrovsk and former Dniprodzerzhynsk (now Kamianske), was merged into the district. Taromske was located on the ancient road from Kyiv to Khortytsia.

Until 26 November 2015 the district was named after Vladimir Lenin (Ukrainian: Ленінський район, Leninskyi District); that day it was renamed to Novokodatskyi District to comply with decommunization laws.

Novokodatskyi District did not escape the Russian aerial attacks on Dnipro (of the Russian invasion of Ukraine); in the evening of 25 October 2024 a missile attack in the district destroyed and partially destroyed two two-story buildings and two dozen apartment buildings were damaged. The attack killed five people and injured 21.

== Population ==
=== Language ===
Distribution of the population by native language according to the 2001 census:

Language	Number	Percentage
Ukrainian	85 771	53.27%
Russian	73 077	45.38%
Other^{[a]}	2 178	1.35%
Total	161 026	100.00%

^{a} Those who did not indicate their native language or indicated a language that was native to less than 1% of the local population.

== Neighborhoods ==
- Bryanka
- Shliahivka
- Novi Kodaky (Novi Kaidaky)
- Diivka
- Diivka-2
- Chervonyi Kamin
- Pokrovsky
- Parus
- Sukhachivka
- Taromske
- Fabryka
- Krupske
- Nove
- Zakhidnyi

== Gallery ==
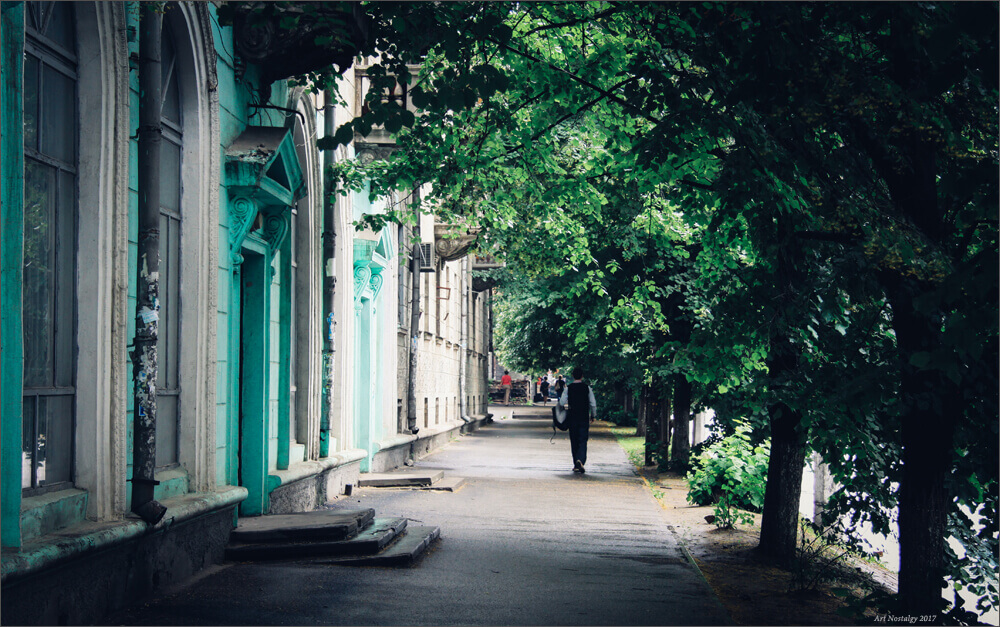
Pedestrian part of the district's Ivan Mazepa Avenue

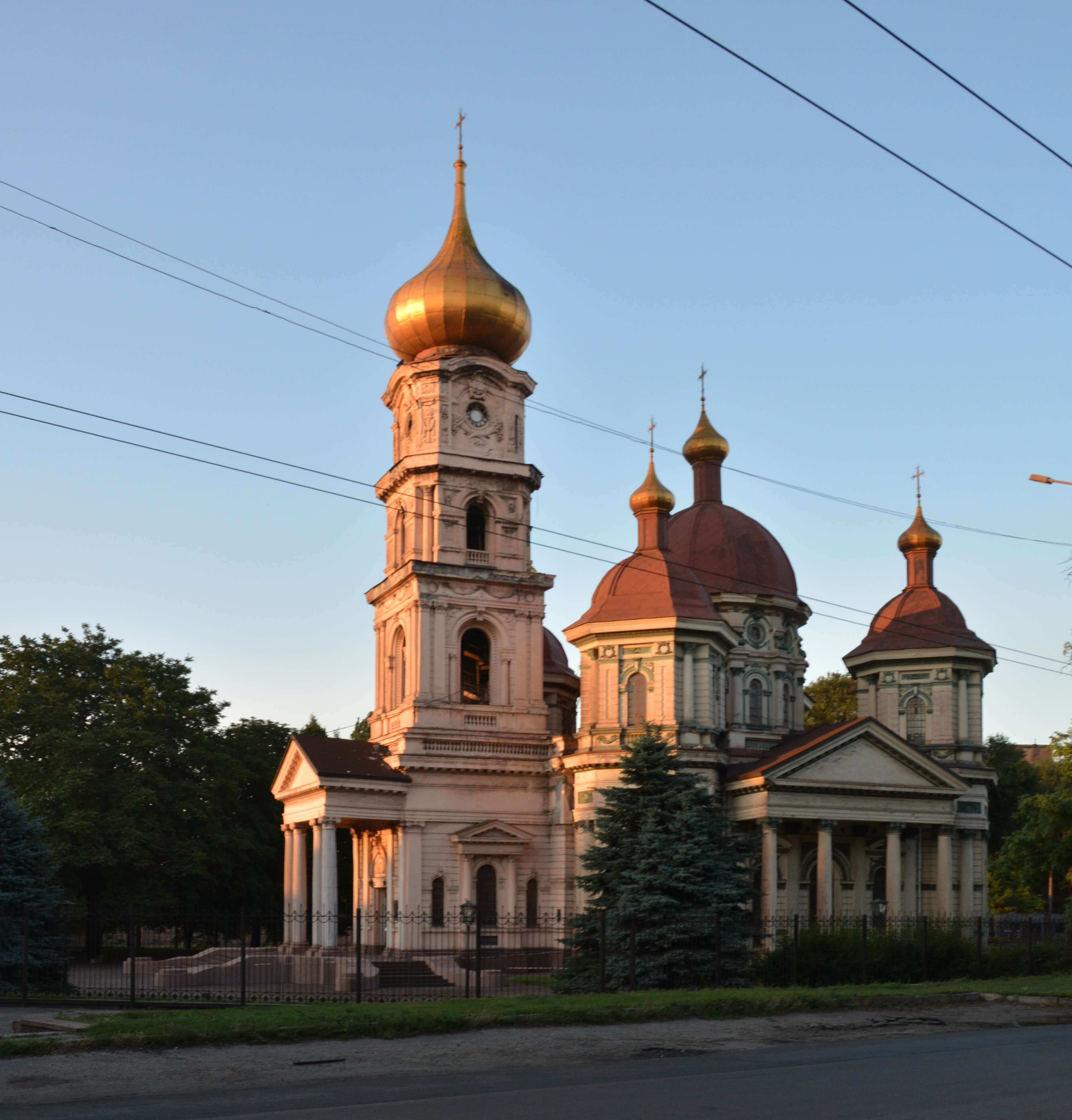
Bryansk Church of Saint Nicholas on Serhiy Nigoyan Avenue

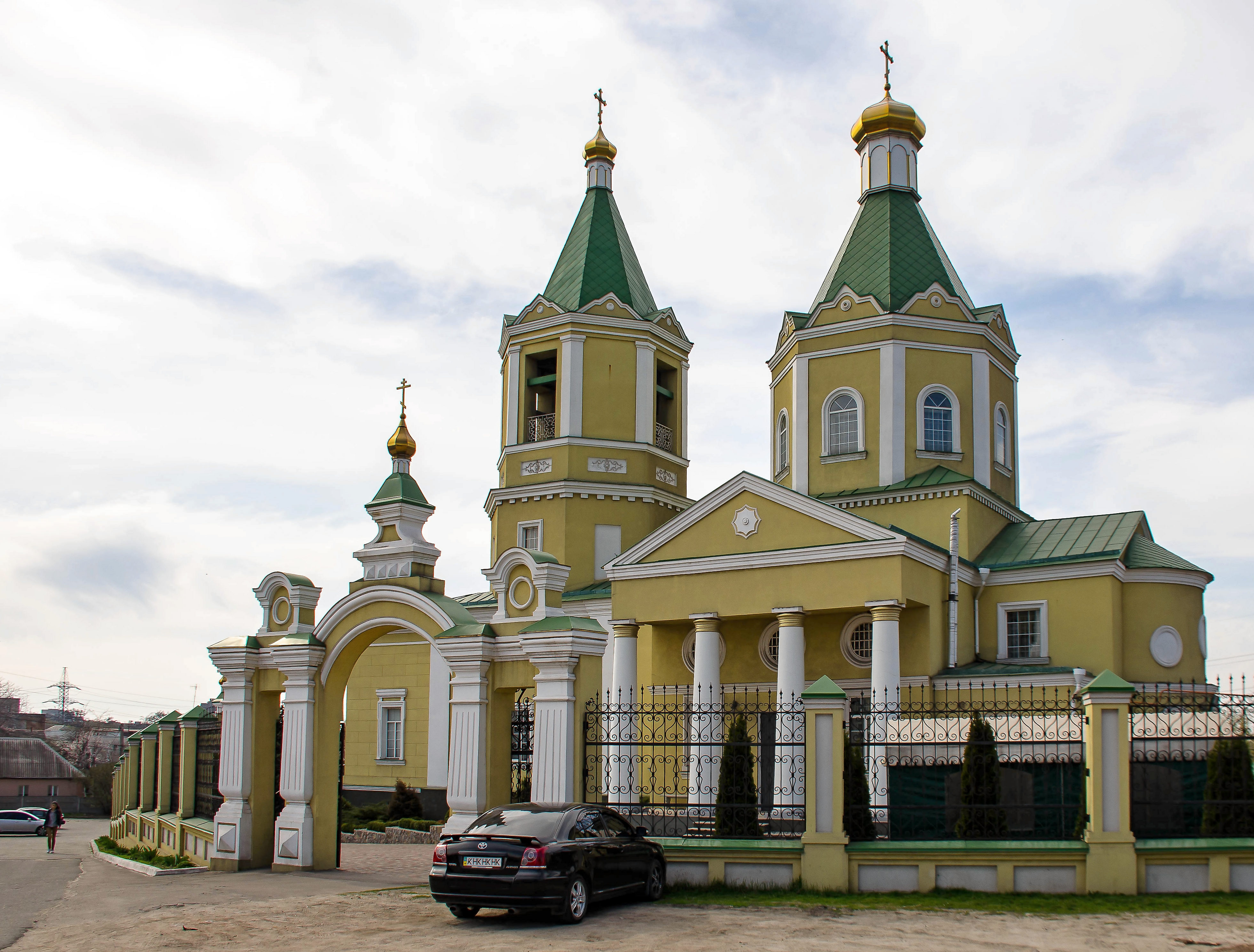
Saint Nicholas Church on 108 Fortechna Street

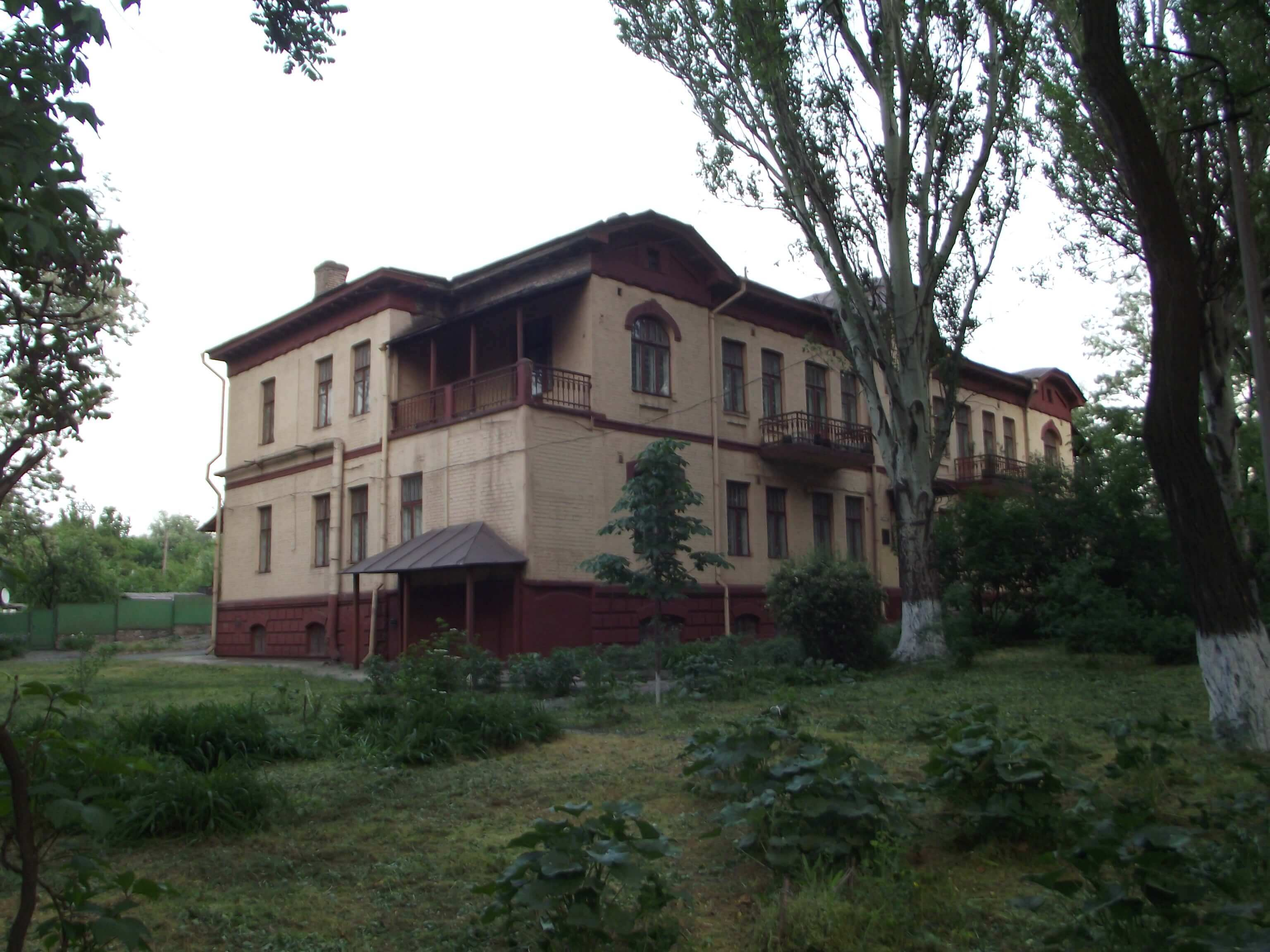
Dwelling house of engineering and technical workers of the colony of the Bryansk plant on Belhiiska Street
