= Shevchenkivskyi District, Dnipro =

Shevchenkivskyi District Шевченківський район
- Urban district
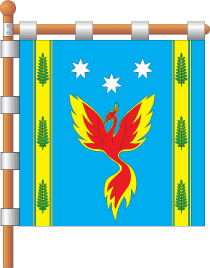
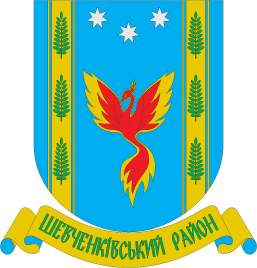
- Flag Coat of arms
- Interactive map of Shevchenkivskyi District
- Coordinates: 48°31′16″N 34°58′42″E
- Country: Ukraine
- City: Dnipro
- Established: 12 April 1973

Government
  - Chairman of District Council: Oleh Yurashko

Area
  - Total: 31 km^{2} (12 sq mi)

Population (2001 census)
  - Total: 159,914
  - Density: 5,200/km^{2} (13,000/sq mi)
- Time zone: UTC+2 (EET)
  - Summer (DST): UTC+3 (EEST)
- Area code: +380 562
- KOATUU: 1210136600

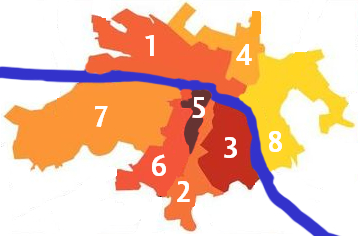
1. Amur-Nyzhnodniprovskyi District; 2. Shevchenkivskyi District; 3. Sobornyi District; 4. Industrialnyi District; 5. Tsentralnyi District; 6. Chechelivskyi District; 7. Novokodatskyi District; 8. Samarskyi District

The Shevchenkivskyi District (also Shevchenko District; Ukrainian: Шевченківський район) is a right-bank urban district of the city of Dnipro, located in southern Ukraine. It is formerly known as Babushkinskyi District.

== History ==
The district was formed on 12 April 1973 from the territory of Zhovtnevyi, Kirovskyi and Krasnohvardiiskyi districts and was named after Russian Bolshevik revolutionary Ivan Babushkin. On 26 November 2015, in compliance with to comply with decommunization laws, the Dnipropetrovsk City Council renamed this district to its current name. The district is now named after the poet, writer, artist and political figure Taras Shevchenko.

== Population ==
=== Language ===
Distribution of the population by native language according to the 2001 census:

Language	Number	Percentage
Ukrainian	66 949	41.87%
Russian	91 074	56.95%
Other^{[a]}	1 891	1.18%
Total	159 914	100.00%

^{a} Those who did not indicate their native language or indicated a language that was native to less than 1% of the local population.

== Notable places ==
- Dnipro Main Post Office
- Dnipro City Council
- Holy Trinity Orthodox Cathedral

== Neighborhoods ==
- City centre (TsUM)
- Pidstantsiia
- 12th Kvartal
- Topolia
- Koreia
- Myrne
- Mlyny
- Krotova

== Main streets ==
- Prospekt Dmytra Yavornytskoho (Dmytro Yavornytsky Avenue), former Yekaterininsky and Karla Marksa
- Sicheslavska naberezhna (Sicheslav Embankment), former Naberezhna Lenina
- Vulytsia Sviatoslava Khorobroho (Sviatoslav the Brave Street), former Bazarna and Chkalova
- Vulytsia Mykhaila Hrushevskoho (Mykhailo Hrushevsky Street), former Kazanska and Karla Libknekhta
- Vulytsia Sichovykh Striltsiv (Sich Riflemen Street), former Oleksandrivska and Artema
- Prospekt Bohdana Khmelnytskoho (Bohdan Khmelnytsky Avenue), former Dnipropetrovska street and Heroiv Stalinhrada street
- Vulytsia Panikakhy (Panikakha Street)
- Zaporizke Shose (Zaporizhzhia Chaussée)

Note: In May 2015, President of Ukraine Petro Poroshenko signed a bill into law, that started a six-month period for the removal of communist monuments and the mandatory renaming of settlements with names related to Communism. Hence, the topography of Dnipro was renamed in order to comply with this decommunization law. The city's name also changed from Dnipropetrovsk to its current name Dnipro in 2016.

== Gallery ==
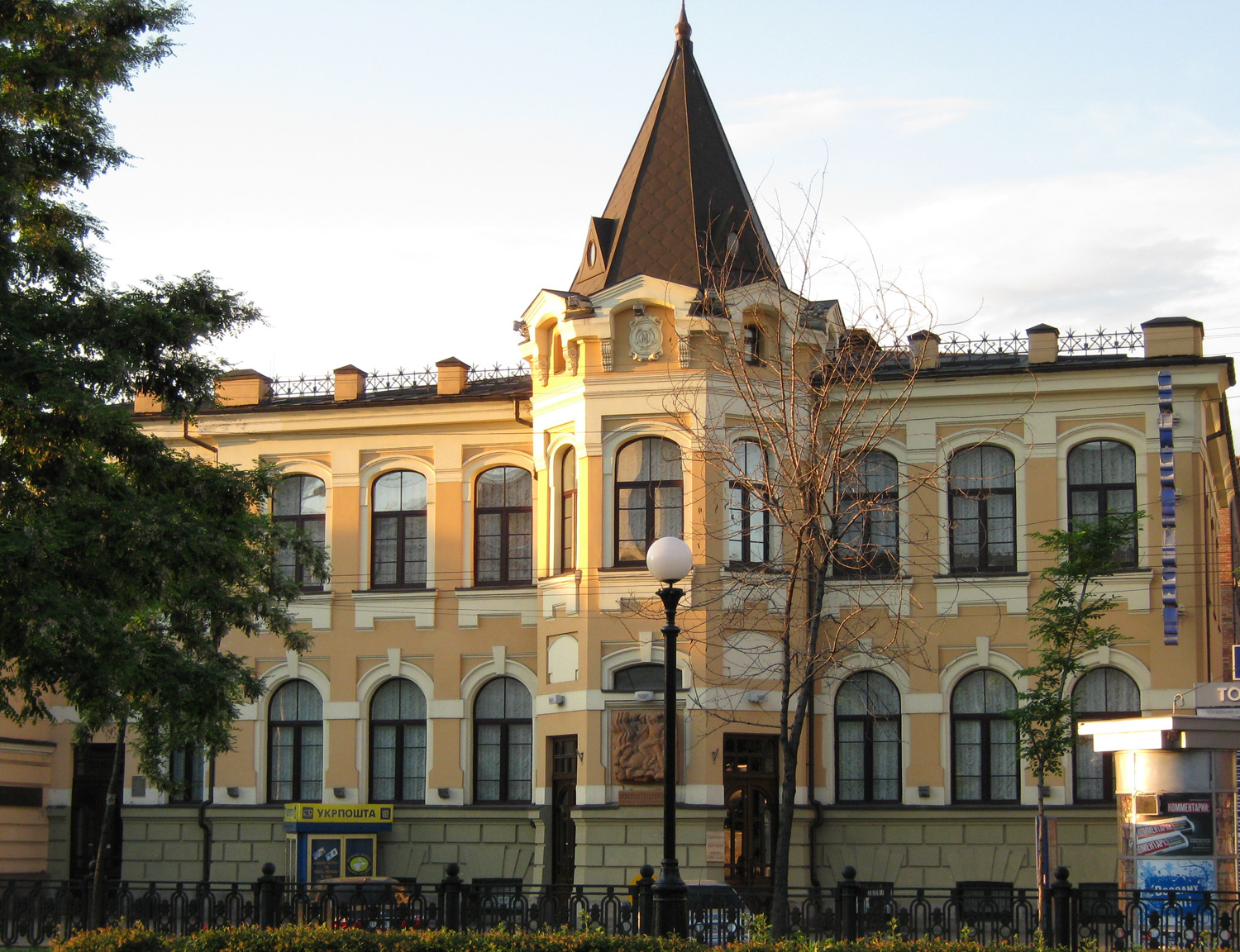
Dnipro Main Post Office

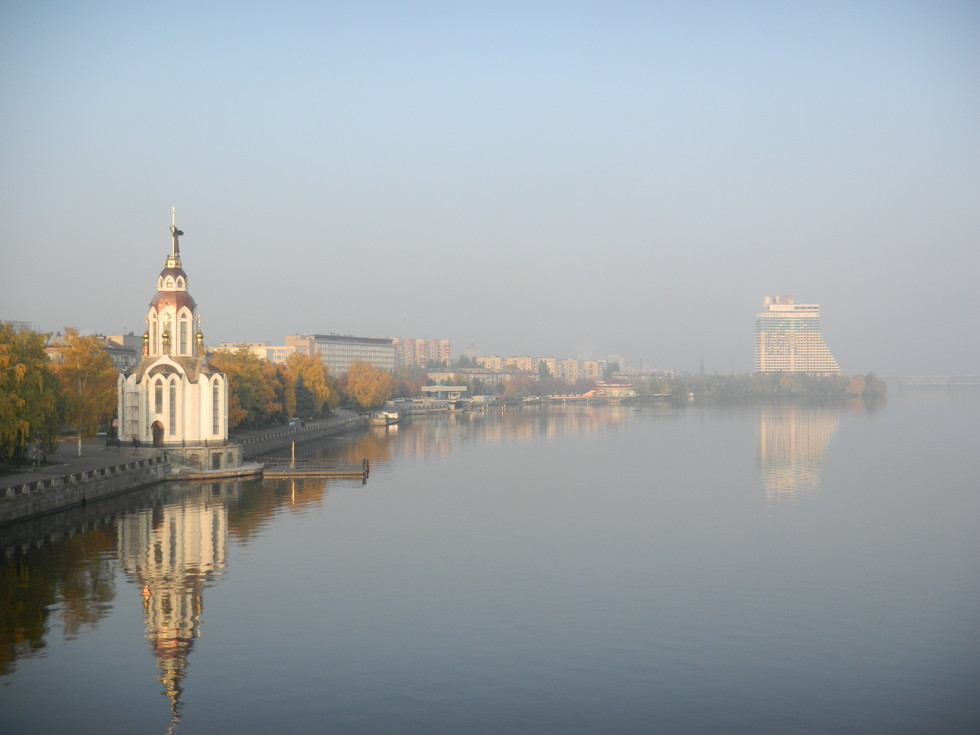
Dnipro river embankment of Shevchenkivskyi District

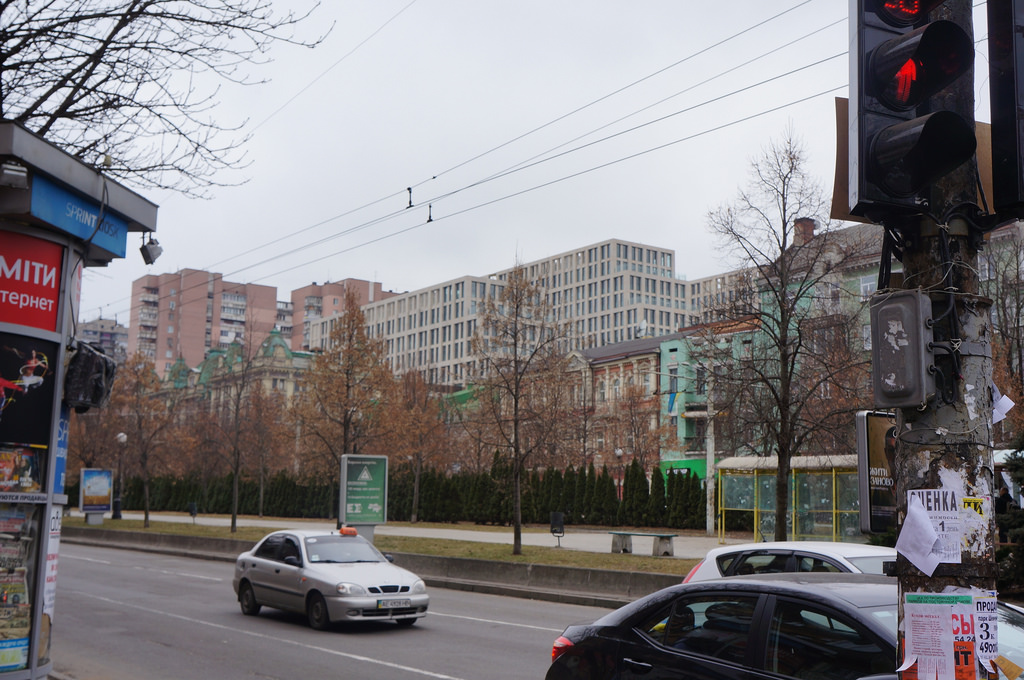
Dmytro Yavornytsky Avenue in Shevchenkivskyi District

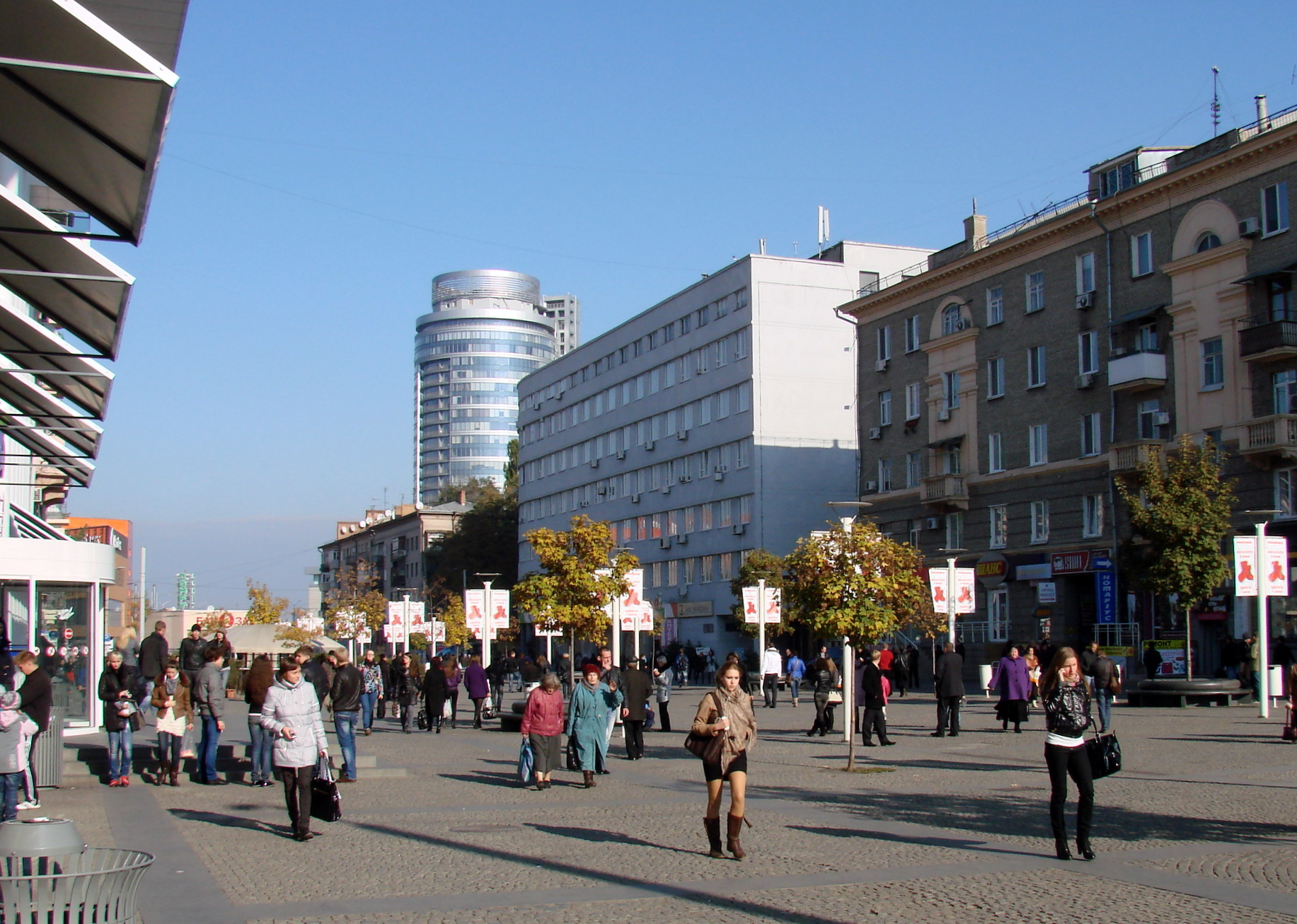
European Square

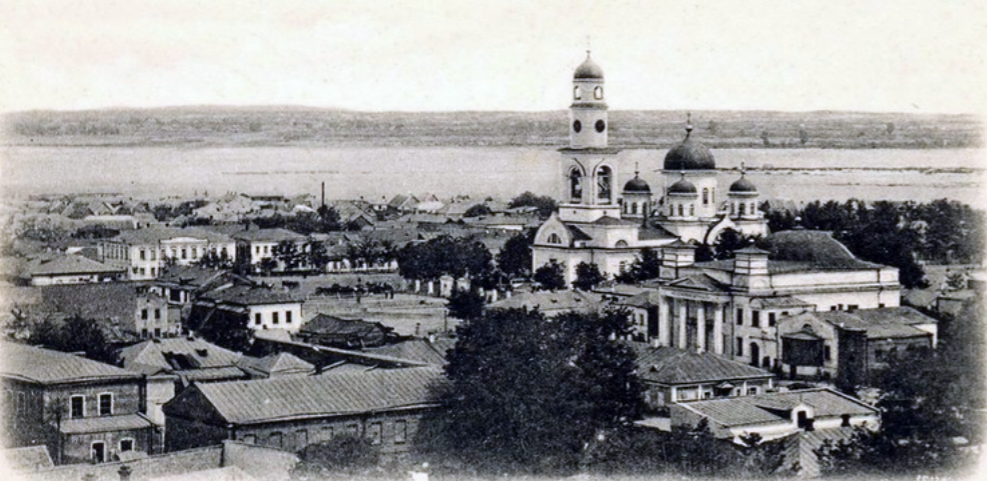
Shevchenkivskyi District in 1910 with the Holy Dormition Cathedral destroyed by the Soviet Union in 1936
