= Chechelivskyi District =

Chechelivskyi District Чечелівський район
- Urban district
- Interactive map of Chechelivskyi District
- Coordinates: 48°25′16″N 34°58′01″E
- Country: Ukraine
- City: Dnipro
- Established: 1897 (1932)

Government
  - Chairman of District Council: Ivan Zahora

Population (2001 census)
  - Total: 120,706
- Time zone: UTC+2 (EET)
  - Summer (DST): UTC+3 (EEST)
- Area code: +380 562
- KOATUU: 1210137800
- Website: http://www.chechdp.gov.ua/

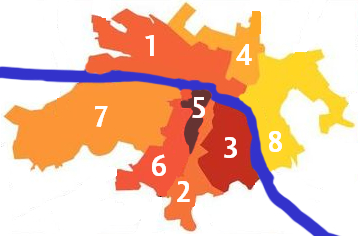
1. Amur-Nyzhnodniprovskyi District; 2. Shevchenkivskyi District; 3. Sobornyi District; 4. Industrialnyi District; 5. Tsentralnyi District; 6. Chechelivskyi District; 7. Novokodatskyi District; 8. Samarskyi District

The Chechelivskyi District (Ukrainian: Чечелівський район) is an urban district of the city of Dnipro, in southern Ukraine. It is located in the city's center on the southwestern outskirts and the right-bank of the Dnieper River.

== History ==
According to archeological finds, in the Paleolithic period (7—3 thousand Anno Domini) human settlements appear near the Aptekarska brook in what is now the Chechelivskyi District.

The district was known as the 5th court district of Yekaterinoslav (Dnipro's former name) when it was first created on 1 December 1897. After the 1905 revolution, the district was renamed into the Zavodskyi District and in 1917 the Brianskyi District after the same Briansk Factory (today, Petrovsky Metallurgical Factory).

From 1920 to 1923 the district was named the Fabrychno-Chechelivskyi District. In 1923 its name was changed again, this time to the Chechelivskyi District. In 1925 it became known as the Krasnohvardiiskyi District.

In 1963 the eastern portions of the district were annexed to the newly formed Zhovtnevyi District. In 1973 some additional territories of the Zhovtnevyi and Krasnohvardiiskyi districts were also annexed to the newly formed Babushkinskyi District.

On 26 November, 2015, according to the order of Acting Mayor, to comply with decommunization, Krasnohvardiiskyi District was renamed to Chechelivskyi District. It is now named after Dmytro Chechel, the commanding officer of the Baturyn garrison during the reign of Ivan Mazepa as Hetman of Zaporizhian Host.

== Population ==
=== Language ===
Distribution of the population by native language according to the 2001 census:

Language	Number	Percentage
Ukrainian	56 708	46.98%
Russian	62 674	51.92%
Other^{[a]}	1 324	1.10%
Total	120 706	100.00%

^{a} Those who did not indicate their native language or indicated a language that was native to less than 1% of the local population.

== Neighborhoods ==
- Chechelivka
- Shliakhivka
- Krasnopillia
- Shevchenko
- Verkhnii

== Gallery ==
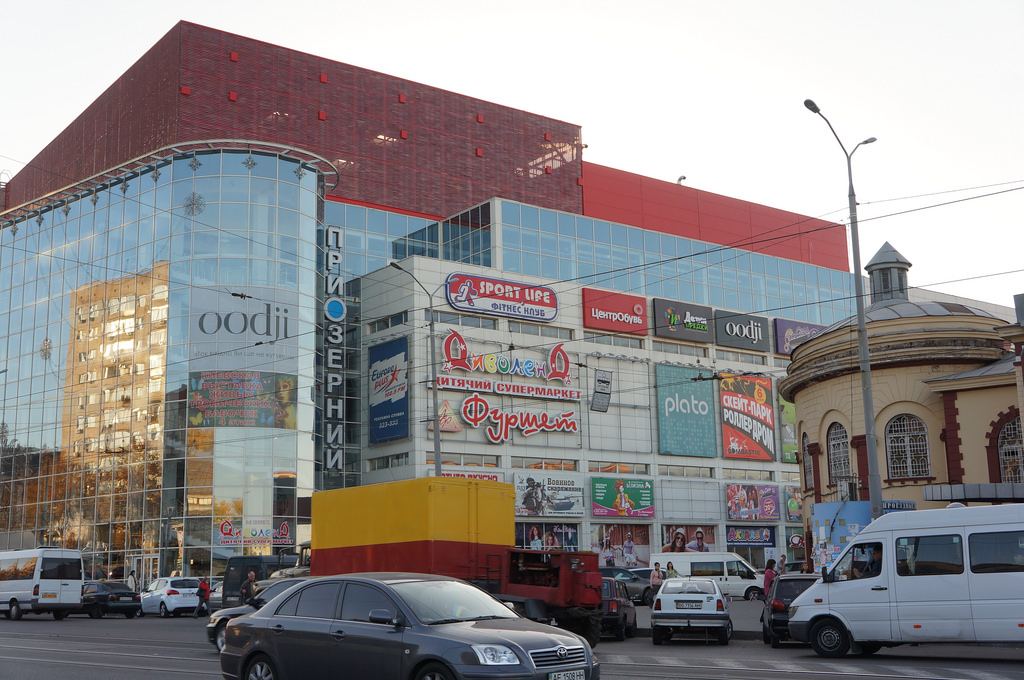
A shopping mall in Chechelivskyi District

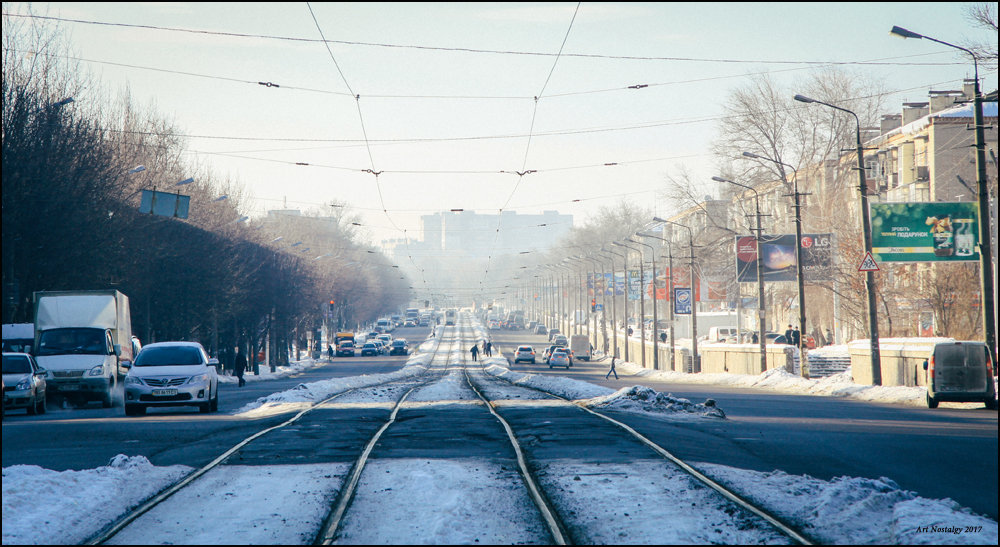
Bohdana Khmelnytskoho Avenue

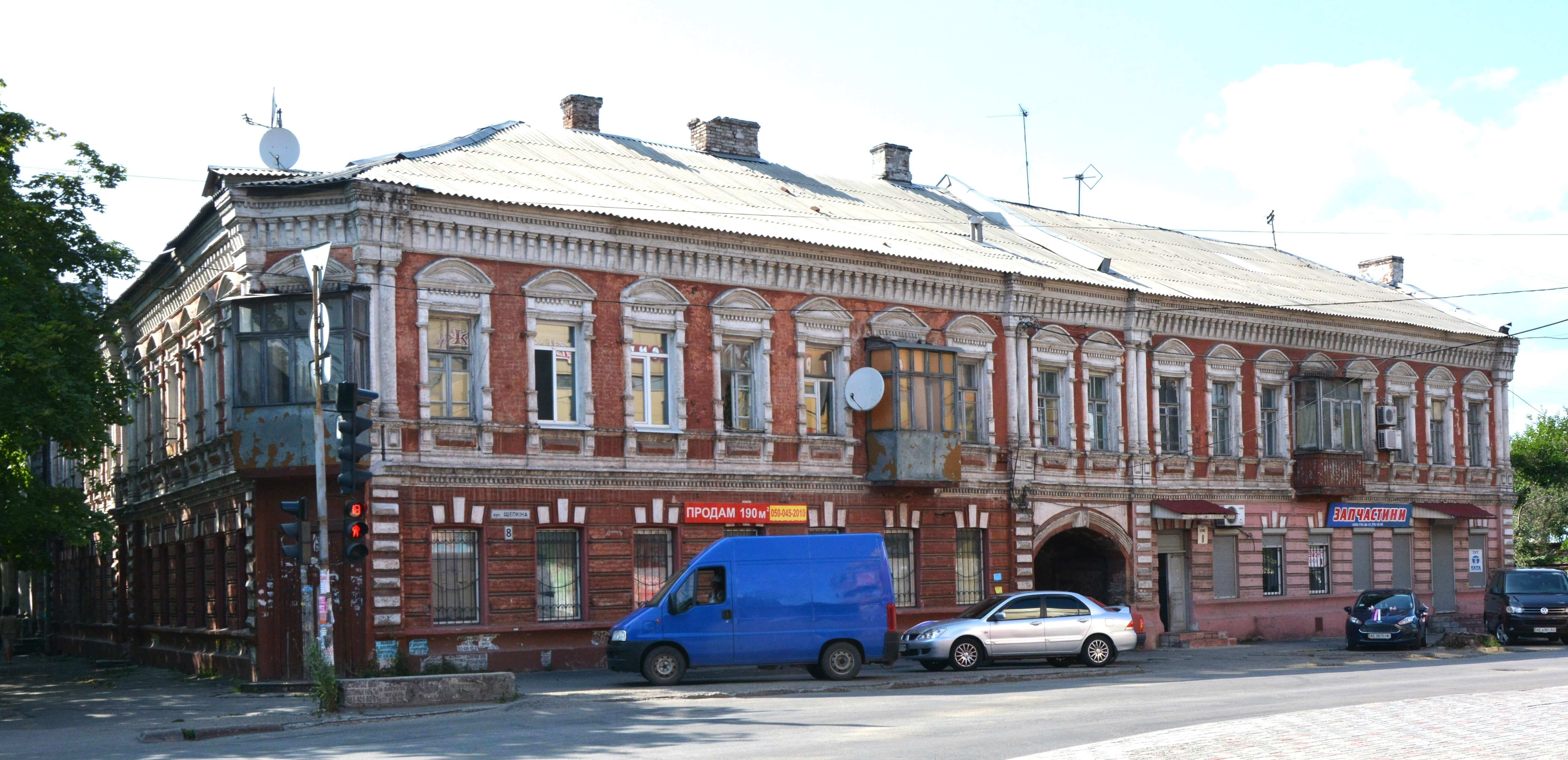
Shchepkina Street

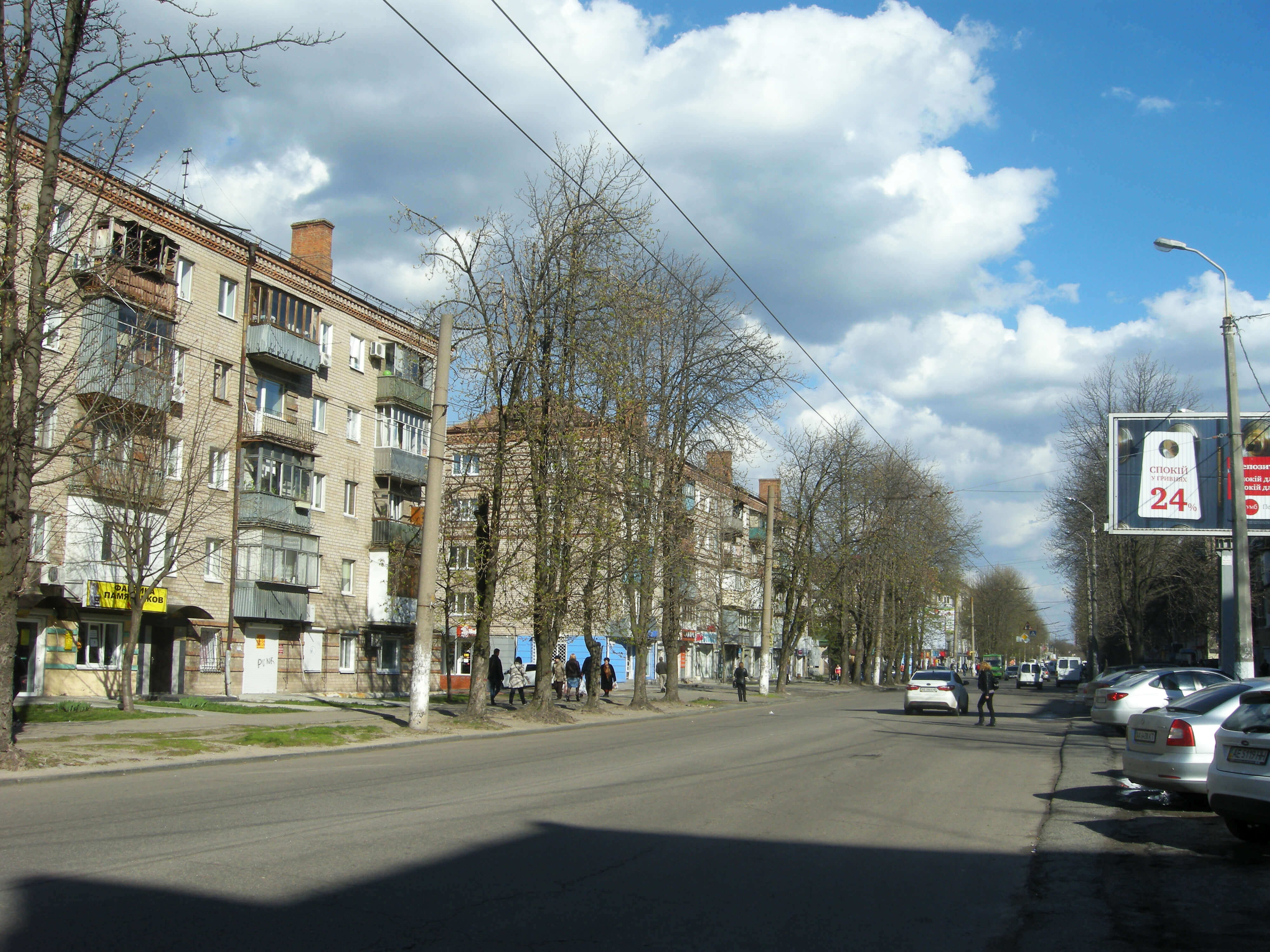
Titova Street
