= Transdnieper =

Historical region around the Dnieper river

Transdnieper (Ukrainian: Задніпров’я, romanized: Zadniprovia, Polish: Zadnieprze, Russian: Заднепровье, Заднепровский край, romanized: Zadneprovye, Zadneprovsky kray) is a historical steppe region on the bank of the Dnieper and beyond. The term was used mostly in the 16th and 17th centuries.

Which bank of the Dnieper it refers to varies between languages, since which side is "across" the Dnieper depends on which direction you're coming from:

- In Ukrainian and Polish it approximately corresponds to Left-bank Ukraine, which is a territorial name for the part of modern Ukraine located on the east bank of the Dnieper River.
- In Russian it approximately corresponds to Right-bank Ukraine, which is a territorial name for the part of modern Ukraine located on the west bank of the Dnieper River.
