= Missile strike on Dnipro on 15 July 2022 =

- Part of Russian invasion of Ukraine
- Location: Dnipro, Ukraine
- Date: 15 July 2022; 21:00 (UTC+3)
- Target: Pivdenmash and residential district
- Attack type: Missile strike
- Weapon: Kh-101 cruise missiles
- Deaths: 4
- Injuries: 16
- Perpetrator: Russian Armed Forces

The missile strike on the city of Dnipro was a missile attack carried out by Russian forces on 15 July 2022 during the Russian invasion of Ukraine. Four people were killed and 16 were injured.

The city was targeted by Tu-95 TS aircraft from the northern part of the Caspian Sea using Kh-101 missiles. According to preliminary reports, a total of 8 missiles were fired. Four missiles were shot down by Ukrainian air defences. Each missile costs $13 million (the eight missiles cost Russia over $100 million).

Some of the missiles struck the Pivdenmash plant. The strike damaged the town’s water supply system, leaving some residents without water. More than ten vehicles were damaged, and doors and windows in residential buildings were shattered.

== Background ==
Dnipro is located about a hundred kilometres from the front line, and the Dnipropetrovsk region comes under fire almost every day.

== Victims ==
Four people were killed. One of the victims was a city bus driver. On the first day, 15 people were reported to have been injured, and the following day that number rose to 16.

== See also ==
- Dnipro strikes (2022–present)
- Timeline of the Russo-Ukrainian war (2022–present)
