= Dnipro strikes (2022–present) =

Russian missile attacks on Dnipro, Ukraine

Coordinates: 48°28′03″N 35°02′24″E

- Part of the Russo-Ukrainian war and the Russian strikes against Ukrainian infrastructure
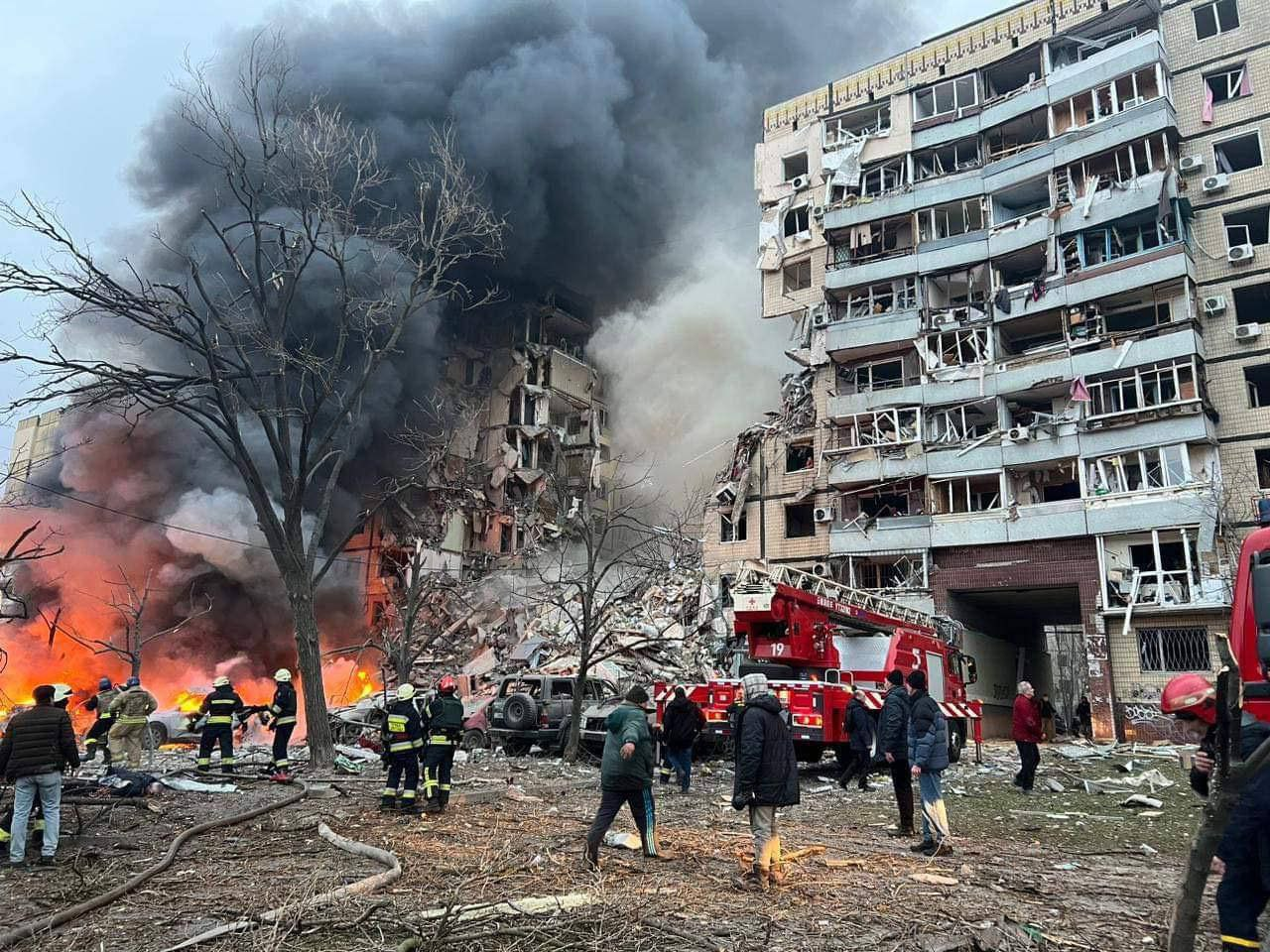
- Destruction of an apartment building due to Russian shelling of 14 January 2023
- Location: Dnipro, Ukraine
- Date: 11 March 2022 – present (4 years, 7 months and 3 weeks)
- Attack type: Missile strikes
- Deaths: 140+ (Total)
- Injuries: 990+ (Total)
- Perpetrator: Russian Armed Forces

During the Russo-Ukrainian war, the Russian Armed Forces have launched several missile attacks over the city of Dnipro in Ukraine. These have led to more than one hundred fatalities and about one thousand injuries among the civilian population.

== Strikes in 2022 ==
=== March ===
Dnipro was first hit during the Russian invasion of Ukraine on 11 March 2022. Three missiles hit the city and killed one person, striking close to an apartment building and a kindergarten. On 22 March the Dnipropetrovsk House of Organ and Chamber Music was damaged in an attack. On 15 March, Dnipro International Airport was heavily damaged by Russian missiles. This destroyed the runaway of the airport. On 30 March, Russian forces struck an oil terminal in Dnipro, destroying it. There were no casualties.

=== April ===
Another attack on the Dnipro airport on 10 April completely destroyed the airport and the infrastructure nearby. One Ukrainian Su-25 was destroyed in the ground inside its hangar, one Ukrainian technician was wounded as well.

=== June ===
On 28 June, Russian forces fired six 3M-14E Kalibr cruise missiles from the Black Sea to Dnipro at around 5:30 local time. One of them hit an Avtodiesel car repair shop, killing a man and a woman. Seven other people, including a six-year-old boy, were injured. Fragments of the Kalibr missile were found afterwards.

=== July ===
An attack on Dnipro proper was carried out by Russian armed forces on 15 July 2022. As a result, four people died, 16 were injured. The main target was the largest space plant of Ukraine located within the city.

The city was shelled from Tu-95 aircraft from the northern part of the Caspian Sea with X-101 missiles. According to preliminary data, a total of eight rockets were fired. Four missiles were shot down by the Ukrainian Air Defence Forces. Each missile costs 13 million dollars (8 missiles cost Russia more than 100 million dollars).

Part of the rockets hit the "Pivdenmash" enterprise. As a result of the impact, the city's water supply was damaged, and part of the city's residents were left without water supply. More than ten cars were damaged, doors and windows were destroyed in residential buildings.

Four people were killed. One of the victims was a city bus driver. On the first day, 15 wounded were reported, and the next day their number increased to 16.

=== September ===
On the morning of 29 September 2022 missiles hit residential areas in Dnipro, and three people were killed. The central bus station was also hit.

=== October ===
Dnipro was also hit during the 10 October 2022 Russian missile strikes on critical infrastructure. It was hit by at least five missiles. During the attack that took place during morning rush hour three civilians were killed.

On 18 October 2022 Russian missile strikes targeted the energy infrastructure of Dnipro. One man was injured and a large-scale fire broke out at an energy infrastructure facility that was severely damaged. Also more than three dozen residential buildings were damaged, including schools and kindergartens.

On 25 October 2022 two people were killed, including a pregnant woman, and four injured due to a fire at a petrol station in Dnipro after fragments of a Russian missile had hit it.

=== November ===
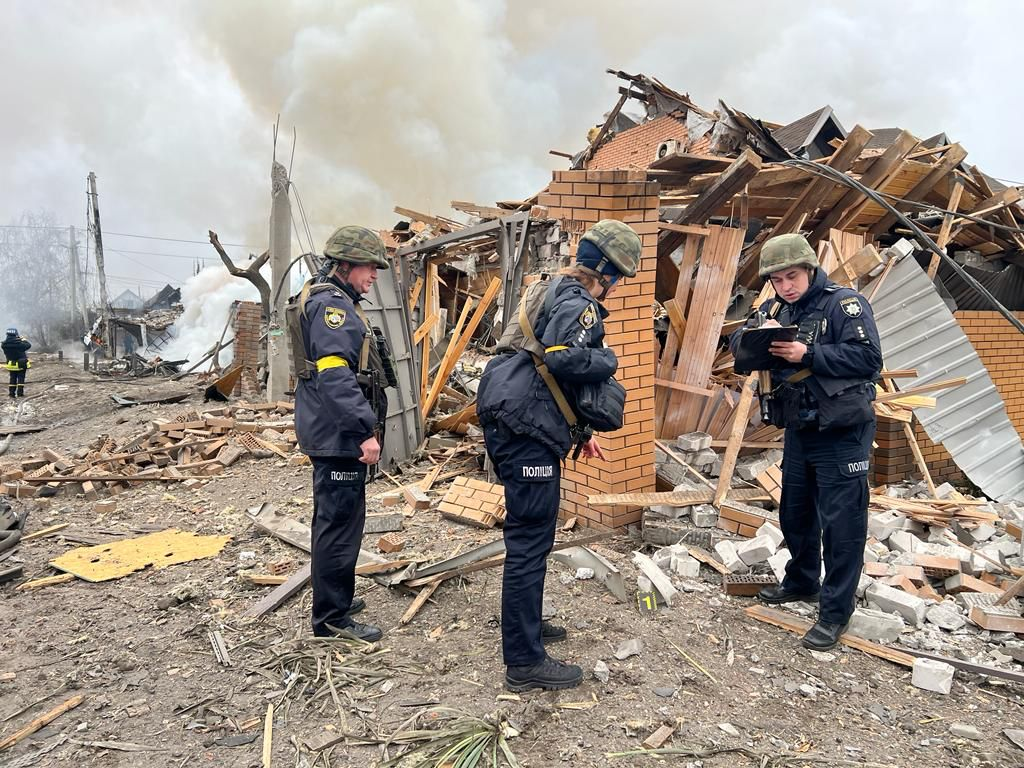
Houses in Dnipro after the strike on 26 November

In the early hours of 9 November 2022 Russian forces deployed kamikaze drones in an attack hitting a logistics business and causing a large fire. Four employees sustained injuries, three severe. Anti-aircraft defence systems destroyed five loitering munitions.

Around 08:30 in the morning of 15 November, while people where commuting to work, Dnipro was hit by a strike on (according to Prime Minister Denys Shmyhal) the PA Pivdenmash missile plant. Governor of Dnipropetrovsk Oblast Valentyn Reznichenko stated that an industrial company, houses, trolleybuses and a "lively street" were damaged. Reznichenko claimed that 23 people were injured, including a teenager. Dnipro mayor Borys Filatov claimed a city hall employee was wounded in the attack while out helping elderly women.

On 26 November 2022, around noon, a Russian missile strike on Dnipro injured 13 people and partially destroyed seven private houses in Dnipro's Amur-Nyzhnodniprovskyi District. Dnipro mayor Borys Filatov reported that city communications and infrastructure were not damaged. Governor Valentyn Reznichenko stated that due to the attack one woman was hospitalised in critical condition. The following day Reznichenko reported that a man was found dead under the rubble.

A Russian nightly multiple missile strike destroyed an enterprise 29 November 2022. No casualties were reported.

== Strikes in 2023 ==
=== January ===
Aftermath of the 15 January attack

On 14 January a multi-storey residential building in Dnipro was hit by a Russian attack. The explosion was heard at approximately 3:41 p.m. A local air alert had begun at 2 p.m. On 19 January, 46 people are known to be killed and 80 to be injured. Eleven people remain missing. Thirty-nine people were rescued.

=== March ===
On 9 March Dnipro was also hit during a nationwide Russian missile strike. According to the Dnipro City Council dozens of buildings were damaged by blast waves and in more than 120 apartments windows were broken. Fragments of a rocket were scattered almost all over the terrain of yacht club Sich. No casualties were reported.

During a night attack on 27–28 March a Russian drone hit a private business in Dnipro and caused a large-scale fire. No casualties were reported. According to Governor of Dnipropetrovsk Oblast Serhiy Lysak two other Russian drones were shot down over Dnipropetrovsk Oblast.

=== April ===
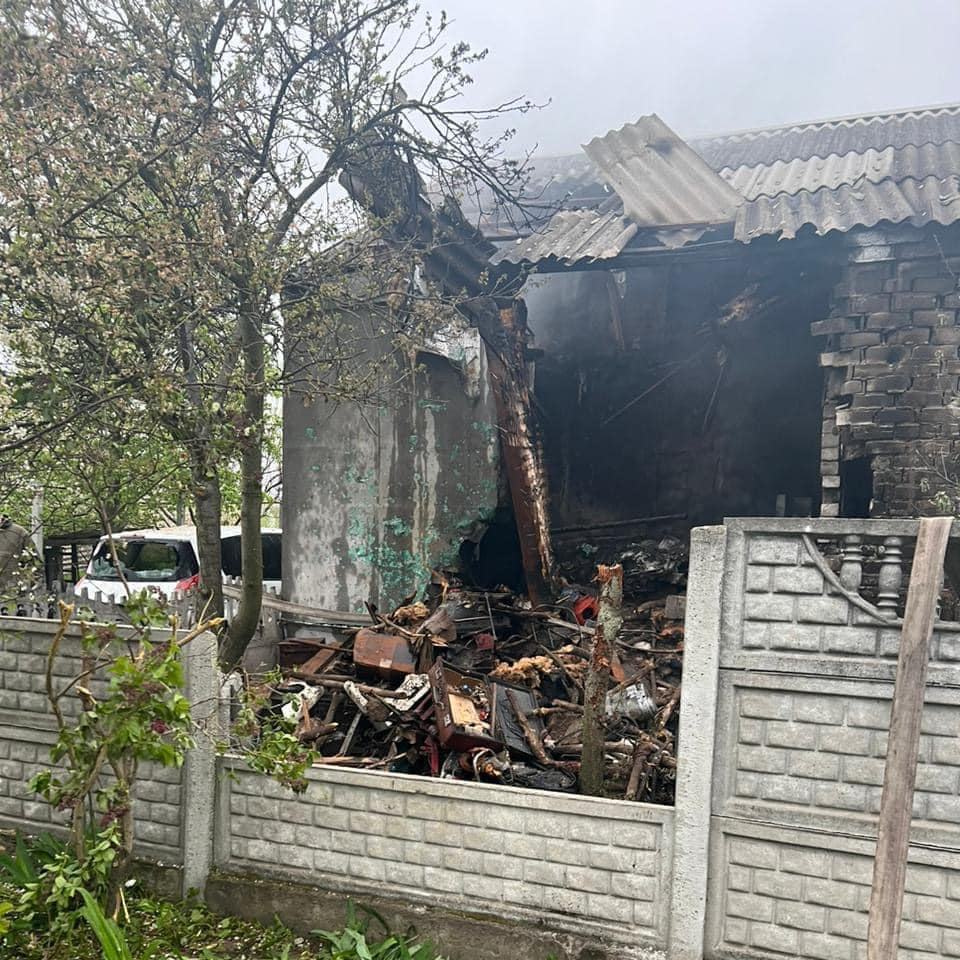
The house destroyed on 28 April

On 28 April a mother and her three-year-old daughter were killed in their home in a rural suburb of Dnipro. According to Governor Lysak seven Russian missiles had targeted the city. Local police told neighbours (of the victims) that fragments of one of them, shot down by air defences, appeared to have fallen on the house.

=== May ===
On 3 May, in the night, a drone hit an administrative building in Dnipro. According to Governor Lysak it was set on fire, although that was put out by morning. Lysak also reported that the attack had not led to casualties. Ukrainian Air Defence Forces reported that they had shot down seven missiles flying over Dnipropetrovsk Oblast, and that this one drone had (still) hit its target.

In the evening of 8 May a 32-year-old woman was wounded and hospitalised when debris from Russian missiles fell on a four-storey building in Dnipro. A missile warhead was found on the third floor of the building. All eight missiles launched by Russian forces on Dnipropetrovsk Oblast were downed by Ukrainian Air Defence Forces.

During the night of 21–22 May the premises of a private firm were hit by a Russian missile strike; eight people were injured (three of them hospitalised) and three buildings were damaged as a result. 20 pieces of equipment of the State Emergency Service of Ukraine were destroyed. Ukraine's air defence forces reported that they had shot down 15 Russian drones and four cruise missiles during the attack on Dnipropetrovsk Oblast.

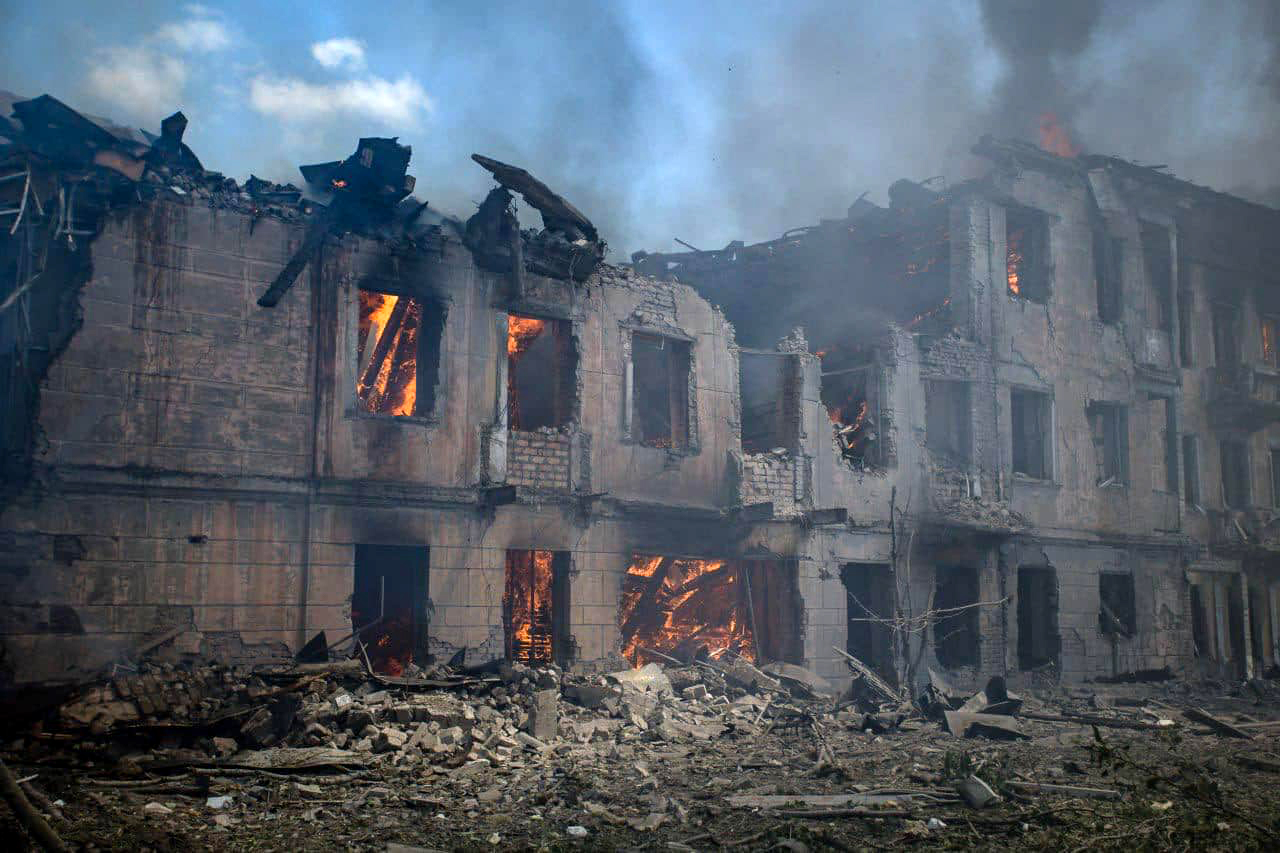
Clinic in Dnipro after the strike on 26 May

On 26 May a Russian missile strike hit an outpatient clinic and a veterinarian clinic, killing 4 people and injuring 30 (three severely wounded). The missile attack hit a three-storey building within a medical institution that was partially destroyed and caught fire. The fire then also engulfed a neighbouring building. Among the injured were a baby and a child, born in 2020 and 2017 respectively. 27 May was declared a day of mourning for those who died as a result of the attack.

=== June ===
During the night of 3–4 June a Russian missiles struck a residential area killing a two-year-old girl and injuring another 22 people, including five children. The attack destroyed or damaged several buildings in Pidhorodne, which lies on the outskirts of Dnipro city. (Note: Local news website Informator called Pidhorodne a suburb of Dnipro, The Guardian called Pidhorodne a town on the outskirts of Dnipro city.) According to the General Staff of the Ukrainian Armed Forces one Iskander-K missile had hit a two-story apartment building. (According to local police) 10 private houses, cars, shops and gas pipelines were destroyed after a fire broke out as a result of the explosion. The rescue operation was completed at 3 am.

In the night of 24 June, 11 people, including three children, were injured by a missile attack that destroyed four homes in a residential area. The blast wave damaged more than 20 buildings.

=== July ===
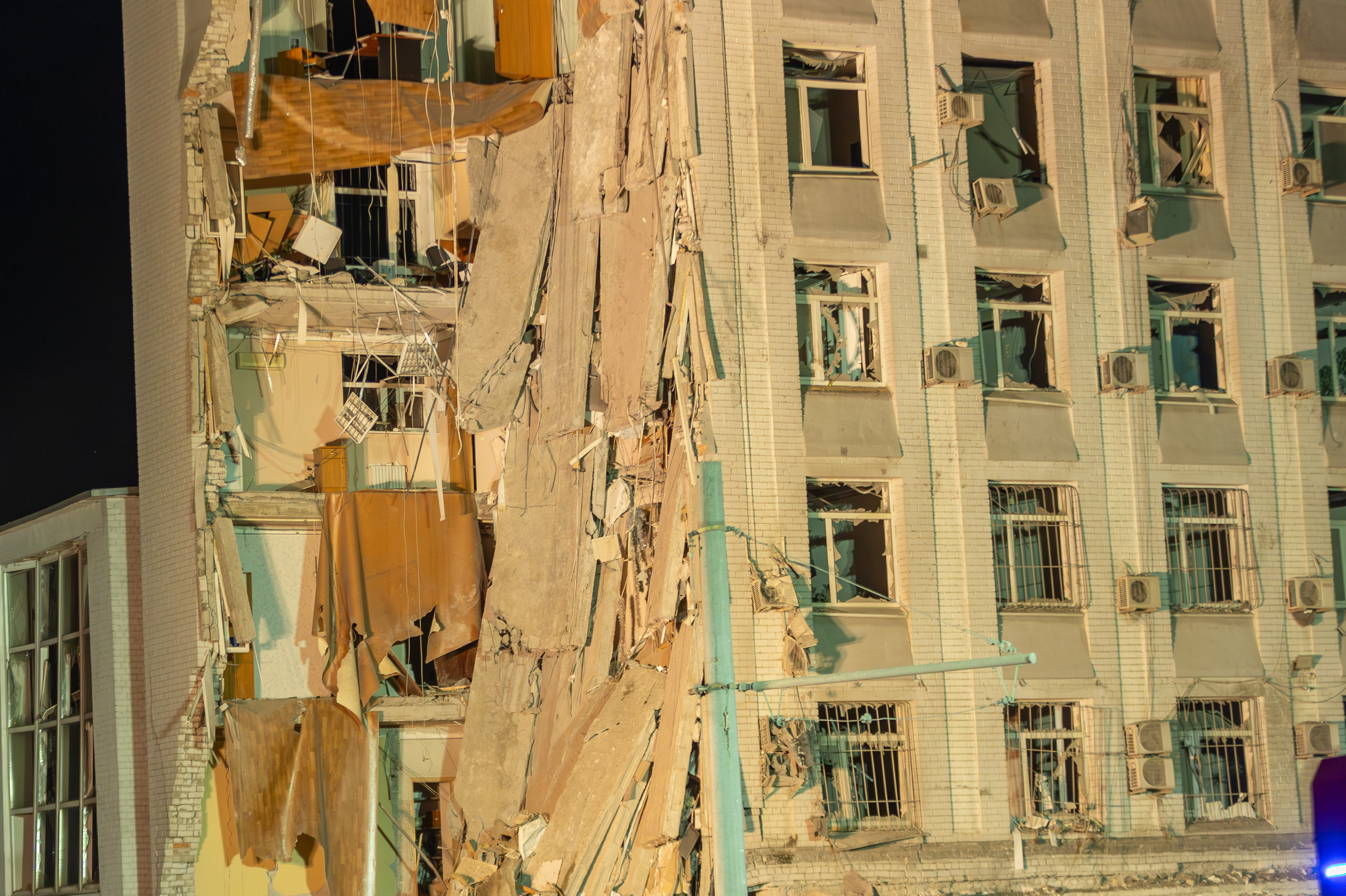
The building, hit on 28 July

At around 20.30 hour on 28 July 2023 a Russian missiles attack (locals heard two explosions) hit a high-rise building in the centre of Dnipro. A new residential complex, where many apartments were still uninhabited, was damaged. An office of the Security Service of Ukraine was also hit, but was reported to have been not in use for a while. (Note: Dnipro mayor Borys Filatov claimed that this strike was the third time the Security Service of Ukraine building had been targeted by Russia.) Dnipro mayor Borys Filatov claimed that Russian Iskander missals had hit the buildings. Nine injured were reported and no deaths have been reported. On 29 July 2023 Russia's Defense Ministry spokesman Igor Konashenkov claimed "On the evening of July 28, the Russian Armed Forces targeted the Ukrainian armed forces' command center in the city of Dnipro with high-precision weapons. The target was hit." (Note: The city of Dnipropetrovsk was renamed to its current name Dnipro in 2016 to comply with decommunization laws; in his report Igor Konashenkov referred to the city as Dnepropetrovsk; the Russian language version of the name Dnipropetrovsk.)

=== August ===
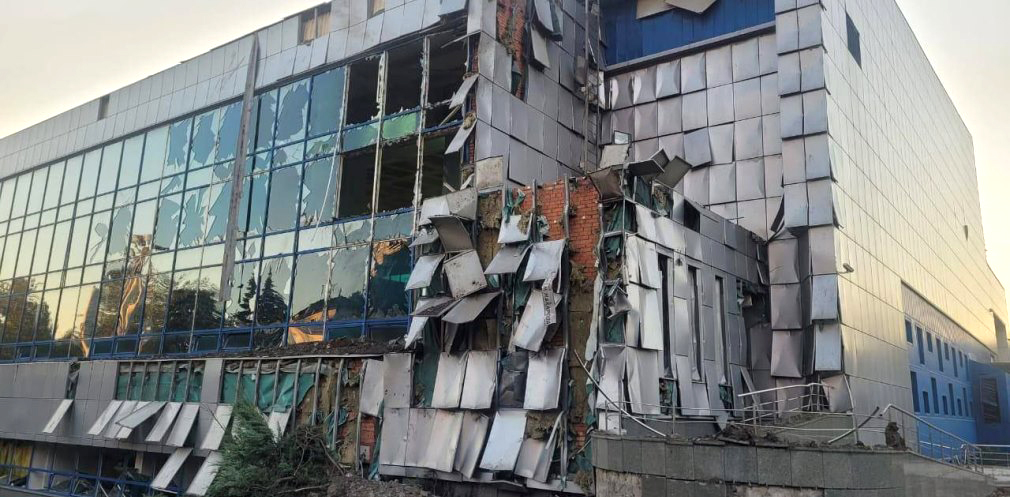
Palace of water sports damaged on 15 August

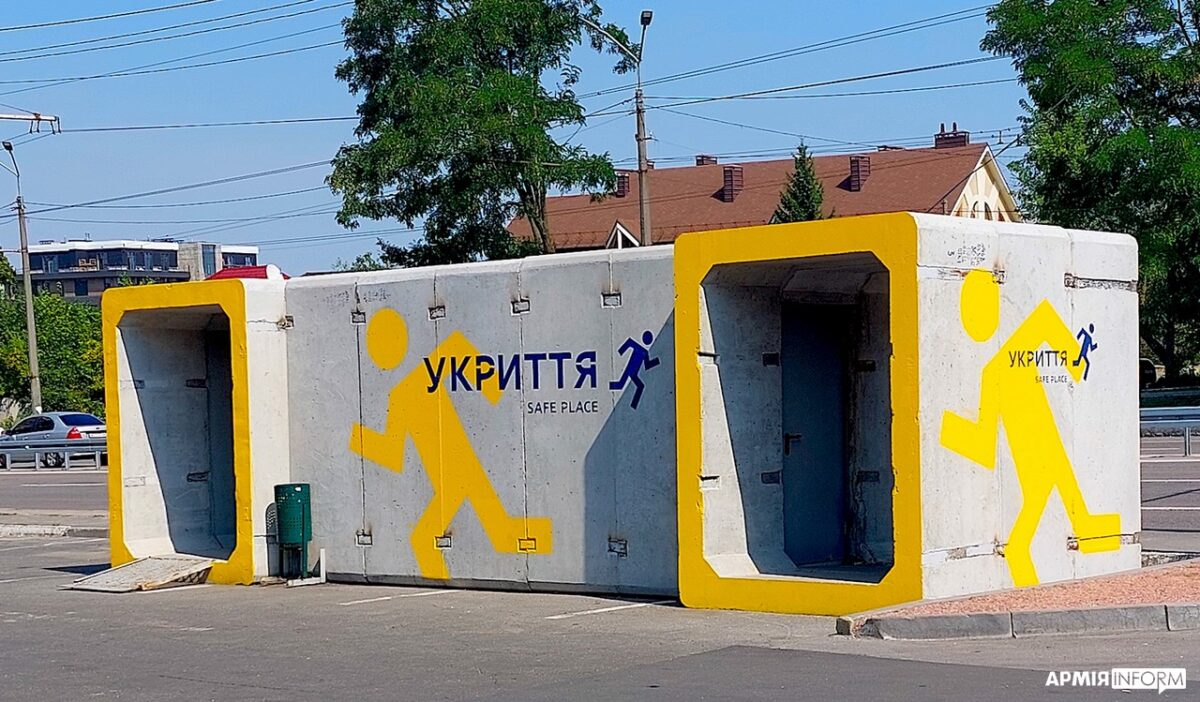
Bomb shelter in Dnipro, August 2023

At 4:20 on 15 August 2023 one of the industrial facilities in Dnipro was hit, 2 wounded were reported. At around the same time a swimming pool was also hit, with no casualties reported. Later that day Russian military spokesman Igor Konashenkov claimed that these attacks had been a "concentrated blow to key enterprises in the military industry of the Kyiv regime." According to him, the goal of the strikes was achieved.

At around 2:30 on 24 August 2023 (Ukrainian independence day) multiple rockets hit Dnipro's Central Bus Station. Ten people were injured, six were hospitalised with minor injuries. 15 shops near the station were destroyed or damaged. Besides the bus station 10 other buildings were also damaged including two residential buildings, a bank, a petrol station, a hotel, premises belonging to an agricultural company, a furniture manufacturer and an administrative building. Additionally three buses and several cars, a trolleybus network line, as well as water and gas pipelines, were damaged. Later that day Russian military spokesman Igor Konashenkov claimed that the previous night "a multiple-launch strike by seaborne and ground-based long-range precision weapons against a Ukrainian military command center" had destroyed this target. (Note: Russia's Defense Ministry spokesman Igor Konashenkov spoke of only 1 night time strike by multiple rockets in the night prior (the night of 23 to 24 August 2023).)

=== September ===
On 23 September Governor of Dnipropetrovsk Oblast Serhiy Lysak reported that the previous night wreckage from a shot down Russian drone had damaged "a critical infrastructure facility" in Dnipro.

=== October ===
On 3 October Governor of Dnipropetrovsk Oblast Serhiy Lysak reported that falling debris, of the 13 UAVs and a cruise missile that had been shot down over Dnipropetrovsk Oblast, had caused a fire at a Dnipro private firm that was quickly doused. In a later update Lysak stated that a school, a kindergarten, a petrol station and three apartment buildings in Dnipro were damaged by "fragments of downed Russian junk"; in addition to a warehouse being destroyed by fire.

=== December ===
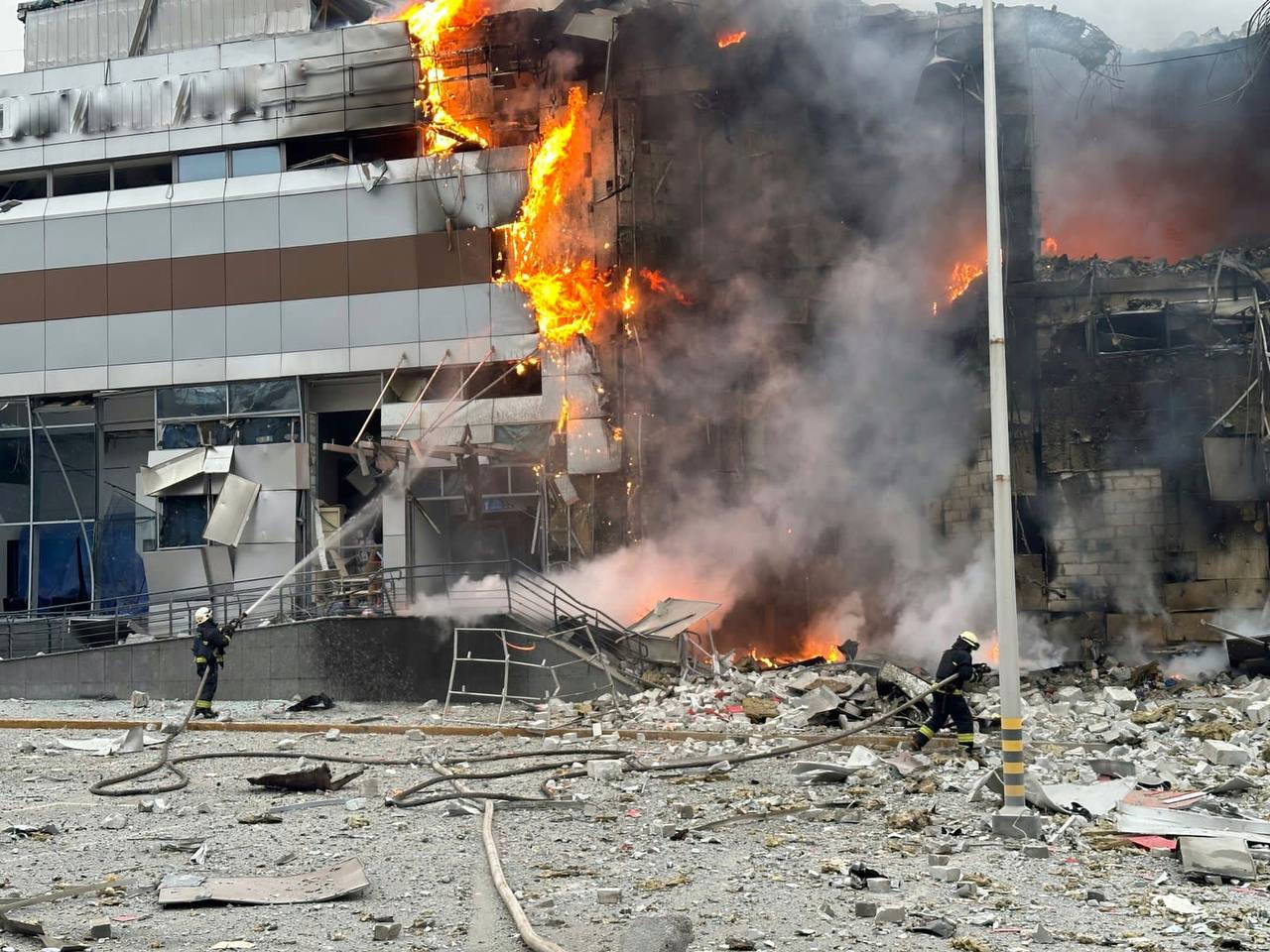
Aftermath of the missile strike on a shopping mall

On 29 December 2023, Russia launched at least 122 cruise and ballistic missiles and 36 drones which struck multiple cities (Kyiv, Odesa, Kharkiv and Lviv and) including Dnipro, in what was one of the largest aerial attacks on Ukraine so far. Governor of Dnipropetrovsk Oblast Serhiy Lysak reported that six people died and 28 people were injured in the attack. Missiles struck a shopping centre, a maternity hospital a house and a six-storey residential building. Local online newspaper Informator reported that at the time of the attack in the maternity hospital there were 12 women giving birth, four newborns and medical personnel. All of them survived since they had relocated to a shelter. Two schools and a library were also damaged as a result of the rocket attacks.

The following day was declared a day of mourning.

Two days after the attack another man died in hospital due to injuries sustained in the 29 December 2023 attacks. On 31 December 2023 18 people, including a 18-month-old baby, attack victims were still in hospital. Two patients were in serious condition.

== Strikes in 2024 ==
=== February ===
Video by the National Police of Ukraine of a Shahed drone "type 136" landed by air defense in Dnipropetrovsk Oblast on 9 February 2024.

In the evening of 12 February a thermal power plant in Dnipro was significantly damaged in a drone and missile attack (one missile and 11 drones). No casualties were reported. The plant stopped operations.

Ukrainian Air Defence Forces reported that they had shot down 10 Shahed drones flying over Dnipro Raion, but that this one drone had (still) hit its target. The all-clear was given at 00:35 on 13 February.

On 13 February a city hospital was evacuated and several city school were closed due to heating issues.

In the night of 22–23 February a Russian Shahed kamikaze drone hit a high-rise residential building in Dnipro's Amur-Nyzhniodniprovskyi District and an unnamed businessfacility. Eight people were injured. Ukrainian Air Defence Forces claimed five attack drones were destroyed in Dnipropetrovsk Oblast, but others could not be intercepted. In the afternoon of 23 February the lifeless bodies of a man and a woman were recovered from the rubble of the apartment building. Dnipro Mayor Borys Filatov declared 24 February a day of mourning.

In the evening of 25 February, 10 private houses and several cars were damaged due to a Russian attack. The attack injured two men and two women. According to Governor of Dnipropetrovsk Oblast Serhiy Lysak air defence had downed three cruise missiles and three UAVs.

=== March ===
In the largest Russian attack on Ukrainian energy infrastructure since the 2022 invasion Dnipro was damaged too. In this 22 March nightly attack high-rise buildings and private houses were damaged by falling wreckage of shot down rockets and kamikaze drones, no injuries were reported. Governor of Dnipropetrovsk Oblast Serhiy Lysak reported that 7 drones and 14 rockets had been shot down in Dnipropetrovsk Oblast. The attack left 156 houses in Dnipro without heating. Emergency electricity shutdown schedules were introduced. Parts of the city were also left without water due to the attack leading to a lack of energy supply.

=== April ===
In the early hours of 2 April four houses were damaged by a Russian attack of Shahed drones. No injuries were reported. Another nine drones heading to Dnipro were shot down. In the afternoon a Russian missile strike damaged a kindergarten, a college and a commercial enterprise. The attack injured 18 people including children aged 14 to 17 (five children were hospitalized). According to Governor of Dnipropetrovsk Oblast Serhiy Lysak "Fortunately, all of the children were hiding when the blow was delivered. This may have saved their lives." Later in the afternoon the Ukrainian Air Defence Forces claimed to have shot down a Russian Kh-59 cruise missile that was destined to destroy an unknown target in Dnipro.

At (as reported) 17.50 hours on 14 April the debris of a destroyed cruise missile fell down in Dnipro and Lyubymivka hromada injuring 13 people.

In the morning of 19 April three people were killed in a Russian attack on a residential building and 24 people were injured. More than a dozen residential, public transport, commercial and educational buildings were damaged by the attack. Operations at Dnipro railway station were temporarily suspended. The shockwave of the explosion (also) damaged Dnipro's Central Bus Station, its operations were also temporarily suspended. 16 rockets and 10 drones were fired at Dnipropetrovsk Oblast. According to the Ukrainian Air Defence Forces the Russian forces had fired a total of 22 missiles of various types and 14 attack drones at Ukraine, of this total number 22 had been reportedly shot down. Dnipro Mayor Borys Filatov declared 20 April a day of mourning. Filatov stated that the city had been struck with a Kh-22 missile "designed to destroy aircraft carriers." In the early evening (of 19 April) President Volodymyr Zelenskyy visited the site of the Russian attack where he thanked the city's emergency workers.

=== May ===
Wreckage of downed Russian drones damaged infrastructure facilities and a high-rise building in Dnipro in the early hours of 5 May. No injuries were reported.

On 15 May wreckage of downed Russian Kh-69 missile killed two people. Residential houses, an administrative building and a dog shelter were damaged in the attack.

=== June ===
Missile debris from two Iskander-K cruise missiles shot down by the Ukrainian air force in the early hours of 4 June damaged private houses, causing a fire and injuring seven people, including two minors (the oldest being 17 years old, the youngest 1 month old).

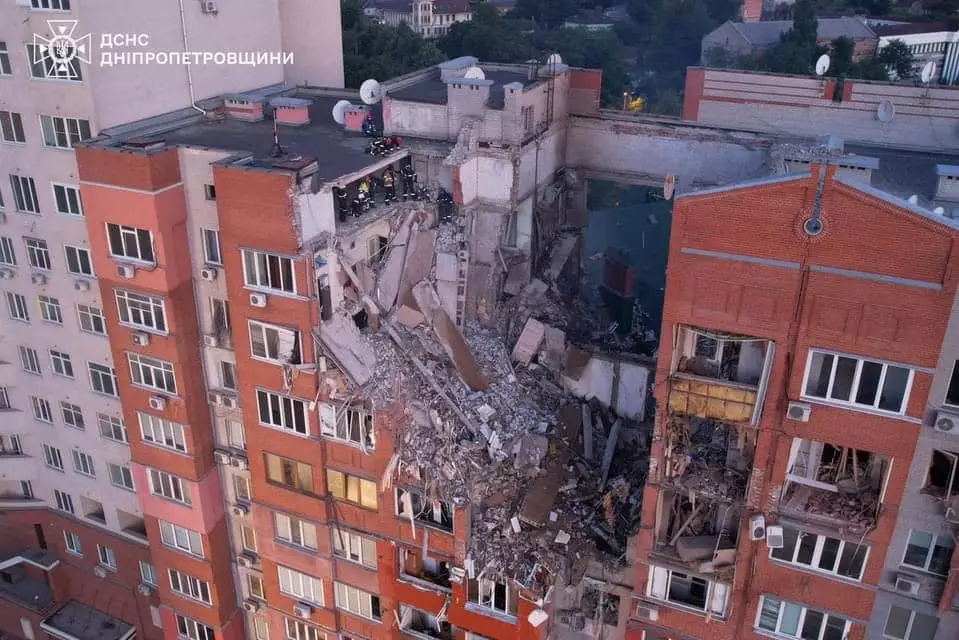
The nine-storey residential building hit on 28 June after the attack.

On 28 June a Russian missile strike hit a nine-storey residential building in Dnipro, killing one person and injuring 13 and two women considered missing. Among the injured was a 7-month-old baby and a pregnant woman. Six days later (4 July 2024) a body of a woman was found under the rubble raising the death toll of attack to three. On 4 July 90% of the rubble of the building was removed, this rubble weighed 1,600 ton.

=== July ===
A Russian nighttime ballistic missile attack on 1 July wounded seven people. Private and multi-storey residential buildings, a shop and cars were damaged.

A morning strike on 3 July (instantly) killed five people and injured 53. The following two days two of the injured died in hospital, raising the death toll of attack to seven. A hospital, a shopping centre, two schools and three kindergartens were damaged. 5 July was a day of mourning (in the city). The Ukrainian Air Force claimed it had downed six drones and five out of seven missiles which had targeted Dnipro.

On 8 July, in an attack that was part of a large daytime aerial attack on Ukraine, one person was killed in Dnipro and twelve more injured. Three people were hospitalized, one in serious condition. A high-rise building and a gas station were hit.

=== August ===
The 26 August 2024 Russian massive missile and drone attacks against Ukraine also affected Dnipro. In Dnipro Raion one man died due to the attack while another man was rescued alive from the rubble of a holiday home. Power outages caused by attacks were reported in the city (of Dnipro). The following day continuing (scheduled) power outages (due to the destruction by Russia of parts of Ukraine's energy grid) disrupted the working of traffic lights, plunging the city into traffic jams.

=== September ===
A Russian missile attack on Dnipro in the evening on 2 September killed a 51-year-old man and injured six people. A 37-year-old spend the following night in hospital while the five others recovered at home. All the windows or a kindergarten and seven houses were broken and premises belonging to a business were damaged. Three cars were burnt out and 12 more were damaged.

=== October ===
In the evening of 25 October a missile attack on Dnipro damaged residential buildings. Five people were killed and 21 injured (including seven hospitalized). One two-story building was completely destroyed and another one partially destroyed (both situated in Novokodatskyi District) and the Mechnikov Hospital and two dozen apartment buildings were damaged. 27 October was declared a day of mourning by the city council of Dnipro.

In the evening of 30 October an attack with Shahed drones injured a 14-year-old.

=== November ===
In the afternoon of 1 November Dnipro was hit by a missile attack, other than it causing a fire and windows have being blown out, no casualties were reported.

Overnight and in the early morning of 17 November Russia launched a massive air attack with over 200 missile and drones on cities across Ukraine. In Dnipro during this attack high-rise buildings, schools and cars were damaged. A 42-year-old man was injured.

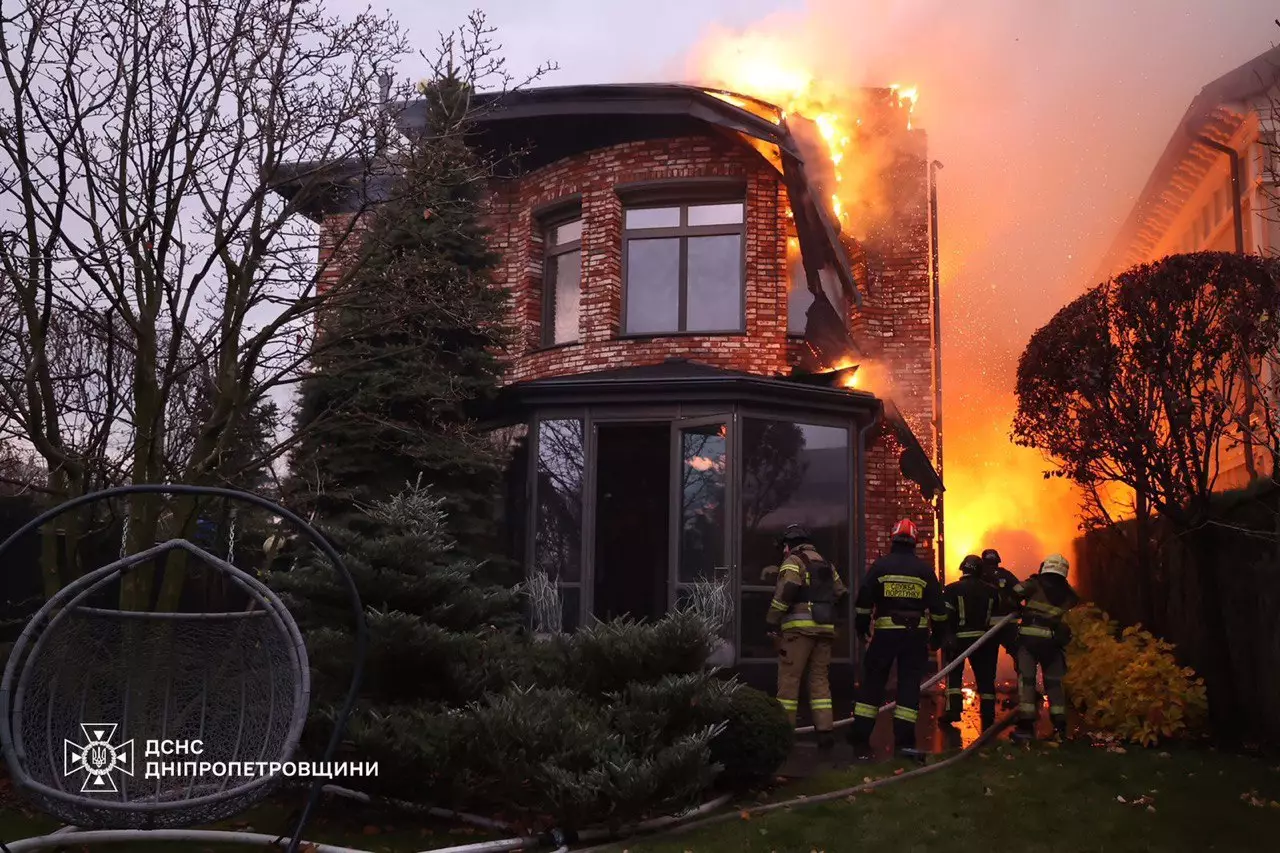
A house destroyed on 21 November

Shortly after five in the morning of 21 November a series of explosions were audible in Dnipro for around three hours. Three people were injured. A rehabilitation centre for people with disabilities was damaged, two houses were damaged and nine garages were set on fire. The Ukrainian Air Force claimed that the attack had been carried out by a Russian RS-26 Rubezh intercontinental ballistic missile (ICBM), which would be the first time that an ICBM had been used in any armed conflict. Anonymous western officials through ABC News dismissed this claim as being an exaggeration and they claimed that the weapon used was a shorter-range ballistic missile, similar to the types used repeatedly by Russia against Ukraine since the start of the war. The Ukrainian Air Force also claimed that its anti-aircraft missile units had destroyed six of the seven Kh-101 missiles used in the attack and that the other missiles used "did not cause any significant damage." Speaking during an unannounced televised in the evening of 21 November Russian president Vladimir Putin claimed the morning strike was carried out using "a new conventional intermediate-range missile" called Oreshnik. (Note: In his 21 November 2024 address Russian president Vladimir Putin spoke of an attack on Dnepropetrovsk, the Russian language version of the name of the former name of the city which was Dnipropetrovsk. The city of Dnipropetrovsk was renamed to its current name Dnipro in 2016 to comply with decommunization laws.) (Note: Vladimir Putin claimed that the strike had "successful" targeted "one of Ukraine’s largest industrial complexes, known since Soviet times for producing rocket technology and other weaponry.")

=== December ===
On Christmas Day (25 December) Dnipro was hit by a missile attack, an administrative building and residential building were hit, no casualties were reported. Seven educational institutions were also damaged. A hospitals, that had more than 100 patients, was evacuated. Mid-afternoon about 65 houses were still without heat, with the temperature in Dnipro being 4 °C.

== Strikes in 2025 ==
=== January ===
In the morning of 21 January a warehouse in Dnipro was partially damaged in a Russian missile attack. Casualties or fatalities were not reported.

A Russian attack on Dnipro on the night of 26 to 27 January damaged three high-rise residential buildings and industrial buildings in Samarskyi District. Governor of Dnipropetrovsk Oblast Serhiy Lysak reported (in the morning of 27 January) that Air Command East had destroyed 13 drones in Dnipropetrovsk Oblast in the evening and at night. No casualties or fatalities were reported.

=== March ===
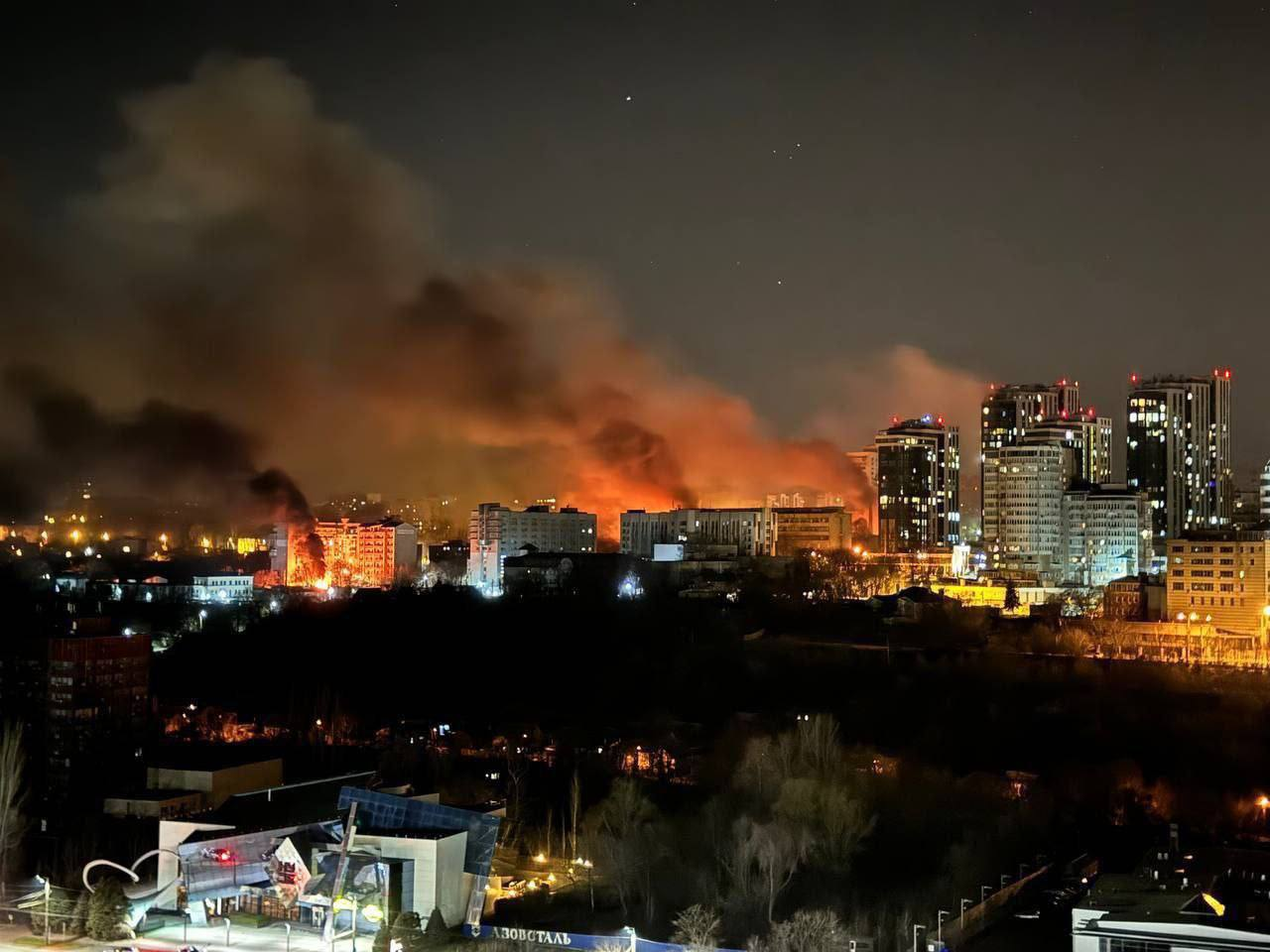
City centre of Dnipro (after a Russian attack) in the night of 26 March

In the late evening of 11 March Dnipro was hit by a large-scale drone attack that continued into the night. A man was injured due to the attacks. Infrastructure, enterprises and around 10 private homes were damaged by the attacks or the fires it created. All the windows of a school and kindergarten were shattered.

Infrastructure was damaged and set on fire by a drone attack in Dnipro on 13 March. Three people sustained shrapnel wounds.

In the night of 19 March Dnipro a drone attack caused a fire in Dnipro, one or more of (the) eight shot down UAVs caused the fire. The fire did not cause casualties.

In the evening of 26 March Dnipro was again attacked by drones. Three people were injured, over a dozen high-rise buildings and businesses, educational and cultural buildings were damaged. Over 60 cars and two lorries were damaged and several cars were destroyed.

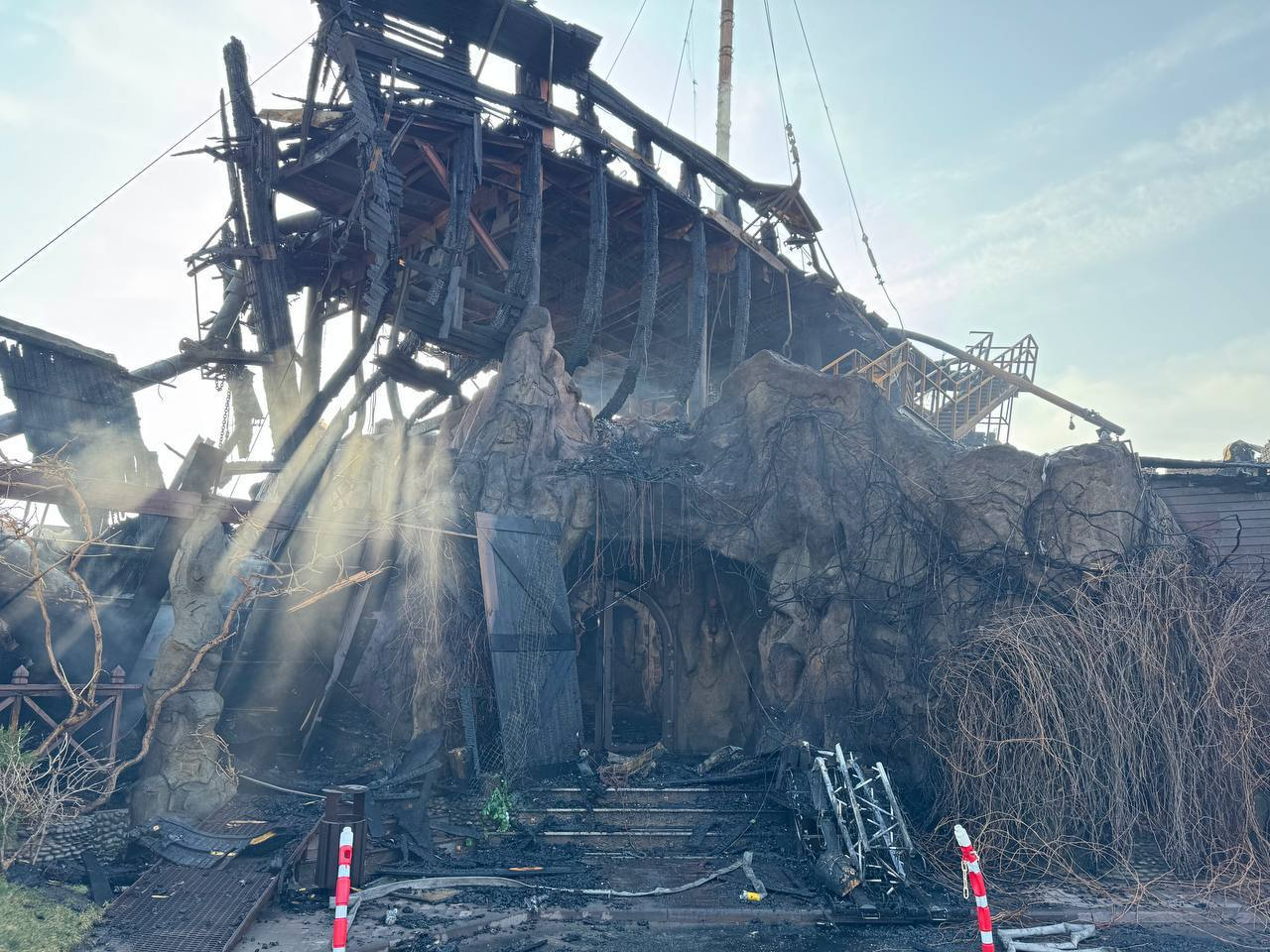
A mock ship of hotel-restaurant complex Bartolomeo destroyed on 28 March

Dnipro was attacked by drones on the evening of 28 March. Four people were killed and 28 people were injured. A large fire broke out in a hotel and restaurant complex, high-rise buildings were damaged, 11 houses, garages and a car repair station caught fire and 21 cars were damaged. Dnipro mayor Borys Filatov declared 30 March as day of mourning for the four people killed.

=== April ===
In the evening of 8 April a Russian drone attack damaged five high-rise buildings causing fires and damage. 14 people were injured.

A Russian missile strike on Dnipro in the afternoon of 10 April killed a man and injured nine others. An infrastructure facility was set on fire and was significantly damaged. The fire covered 6,000 square metre. According to Biosphere Corporation the attack destroyed one of its (household and hygiene products) warehouses.

An attack with UAVs late in the evening of 16 April killed three people, including one child. 33 people were injured, including six children. About a dozen apartment buildings and a dozen houses were damaged. An educational institution building, a student accommodation building and a secondary school were damaged. Various shops and offices also sustained damage.

In the morning of 18 April a Russian missile attack on Dnipro damaged a hotel, an office and a fitness centre. No victims were reported.

In the evening of 29 April a Russian missile attack killed one person.

One man was killed and one injured in a 30 April 2025 large-scale Shahed drone attack on Dnipro. One house and a funeral home were destroyed and several houses were damaged.

=== June ===
On the night of 6–7 June Dnipropetrovsk Oblast was hit by a Russian missile and drone attack. In Dnipro a business, an educational institution and several dozen garages and cars were damaged.

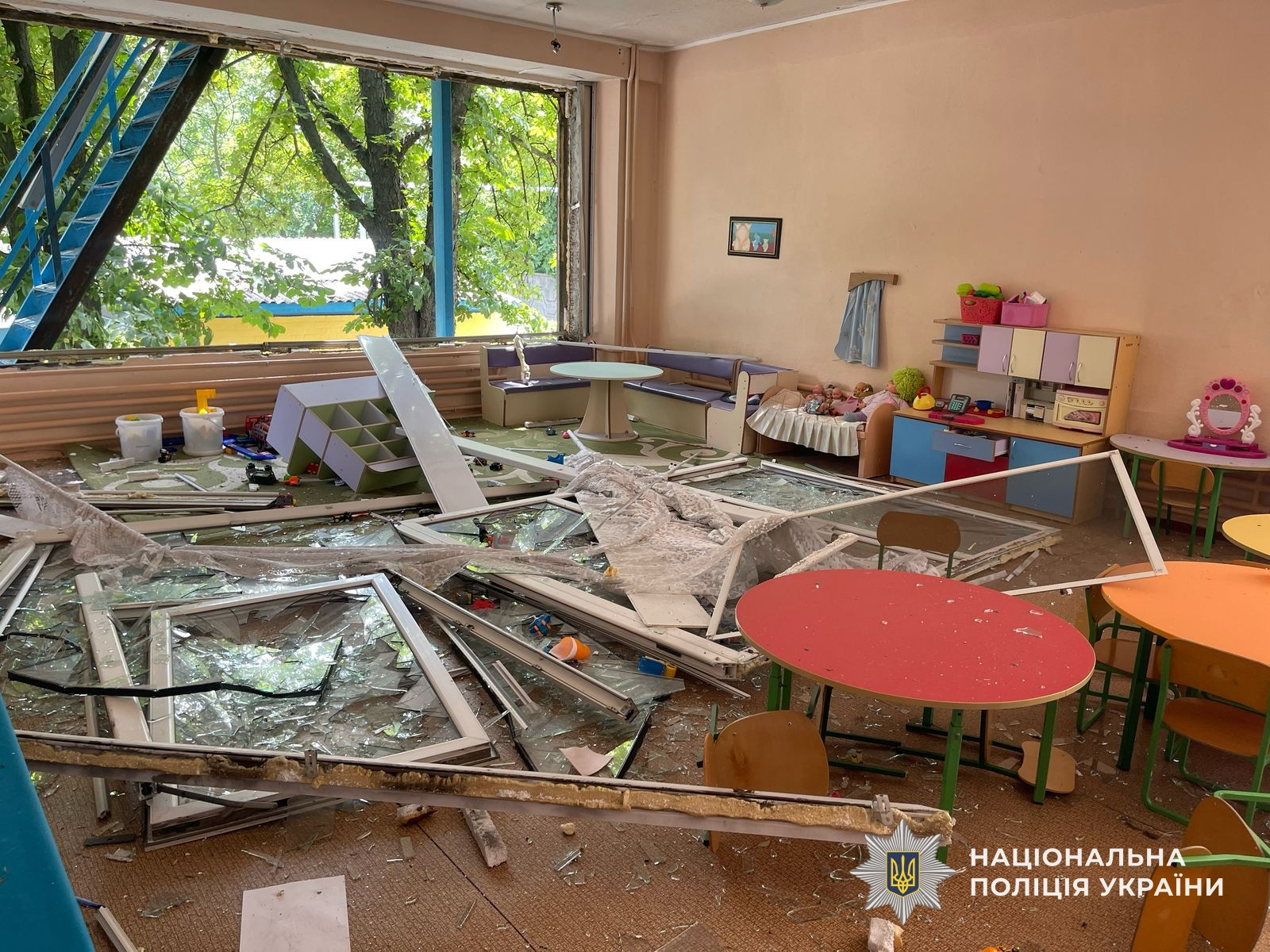
Kindergarten in Dnipro after the Russian attack of 24 June

In a rare daytime attack on 24 June twenty one people were killed and 279 people injured. According to Dnipro Mayor Borys Filatov 19 schools, 10 kindergartens, a vocational school and a music school were damaged. Also damaged were eight medical facilities, a hospital, outpatient clinics, three out-of-school learning centres and a dental clinic and 46 high-rise buildings, 41 private houses and several dormitories. The Dnipropetrovsk House of Organ and Chamber Music was also damaged in the attack. The following day was declared a day of mourning in Dnipro and its Dnipropetrovsk Oblast.

=== July ===
On the night of 16–17 July a logistic company in Dnipro was hit by 12 drones. One employee was killed and five other vivid were injured, three of them seriously injured.

An attack with missiles and UAV's in the night of 25–26 July killed a man and injured a women. The upper floors of a 26-story residential complex in the city center were destroyed and about a dozen cars in its parking lot burned down.

=== August ===
In the night of 6–7 August Russian drones struck the Dnipro again, four people were injured. One private residence was destroyed, eight residential buildings and one administrative building and several cars were damaged after fires broke out.

In the morning of 9 August three people were injured by a Russian missile strike. The strike damaged an industrial facility, a disused building and several cars were burned out.

Two people were injured in a UAV attack on the city on 29 August. Governor of Dnipropetrovsk Oblast Serhiy Lysak reported that an infrastructure facility and a fire station were damaged in this attack.

In the night of 29–30 August Russian drones struck the Dnipro again, no-one was injured. A private house was destroyed, a local shopping center was damaged and 11 private houses were also damaged. The area around the strike was temporary left without water supply and electricity. The family that lived in the destroyed house was by change absent, the family cat miraculously survived the strike.

=== September ===
In the night of 4–5 September Russian drones struck an industrial facility in Dnipro Fires broke out, but no casualties were recorded.

One person was killed in Dnipro during a Russian large scale drone attack on Ukraine in the night of 19–20 September. 36 people were injured. 36 houses were damaged and Dnipro mayor Borys Filatov reported that 8 schools and kindergartens were damaged and buildings and dormitories of two vocational schools were destroyed. The city's trolleybus depot and several trolleybuses were also damaged. The city's urban districts Shevchenkivskyi, Chechelivskyi and Industrialnyi were affected.

On 20 September 2025 a Russian missiles hit an ATB-Market warehouse located in Dnipro. A fire broke out and lorries were damaged, but nobody was injured.

In the evening of 30 September a Russian large scale drone attack on Dnipro killed one person and wounded 31 people. The attack damaged a medical and an educational facility, a museum, and (according to the city authorities) at least 20 residential buildings.

=== October ===
On the night of 30 October a Russian missile hit a commercial enterprise, no casualties or injuries were reported. In the evening of 30 October and the following night a ballistic missile and a KAB aerial bomb hit a civilian enterprise, one person was injured.

=== November ===
In the morning of 3 November a Russian missile hit an industrial facility, one man was mildly injured.

In the evening of 6 November a drone attack on Dnipro caused a fire and injured six people. A four-storey residential building was damaged.

In the night of 7–8 November a drone hit an apartment building in Dnipro killing 3 people and injuring 11, including two children. Two days of mourning was declared in Dnipro observed on 9 and 10 November.

In the night of 14–15 November Russian drones hit Dnipro causing several fires to break out. Private businesses were damaged and a car destroyed, no casualties were reported.

Late on the evening of 17 November Dnipro was again attacked by Russian drones damaging six high-rise residential buildings, the Dnipro railway station, a TV center and film studio and various enterprises, garages and over 20 cars and three cars were destroyed. Two people were injured. According to the Center for Countering Disinformation Russian disinformation attempted to justify the strikes on the TV center, claiming that it was a place of "training UAV operators" and of storing "military equipment."

In a Russian drone attack on 19 November a warehouse belonging to the UN World Food Programme caught fire. At least 10,000 food kits intended to support civilians in frontline areas were lost in the fire; other foodstuff was also lost.

In the night of 22–23 November a Russian drone strike caused fires in an apartment building. 15 people were injured and six cars were damaged.

In the afternoon of 25 November a four-storey residential building and an educational institution in Samarskyi District and a power line were damaged in a Russian drone attack. A woman and a four-year-old girl were injured.

=== December ===
A Russian missile strike on Dnipro city centre in the morning of 1 December killed four people and injured 40 people. Eleven people were reported to be seriously injured. Damaged were an industrial facility, a production facility, an educational institution, high-rise buildings, shops, a bank office and various cars. More than 200 windows were broken by the blast wave. A day of mourning was declared in Dnipro observed on 2 December.

On 6 December fragments of a Russian rocket fell on a playground in Lazar Hloba Park. One facility in the park was (also) hit and damaged. A fire broke out in a warehouse that raged for hours. A fire broke out in a BADM warehouse, it stored medicines for millions of consumers across Ukraine. In this fire $110m worth of medicines (to be distributed by BADM) were destroyed, about 30% of Ukraine's monthly supply. The warehouse was also used by the International Rescue Committee (IRC) who stated it had lost $195,000 worth of medication and supplies, which could have helped 30,000 people. IRC stated that the lost warehouse had been "a critical hub." Due to the fire the air quality in Dnipro deteriorated. Because of this, Dnipro residents were advised, by local publication Informator, to reduce their time outdoors. Personal injuries were not reported in Dnipro. Dnipro mayor Borys Filatov reported on Telegram that a warehouse of gauze and bandages and a warehouse with tires had been hit and were burning. In a post on Telegram the Russian defense ministry stated it had (throughout Ukraine) "targeted Ukrainian military-industrial enterprises, the energy facilities that support their operation and the port infrastructure used by the Ukrainian forces" in response to "Ukrainian attacks on civilian targets."

== Strikes in 2026 ==
=== January 2026 ===
On 5 January a Russian drone damaged a municipal facility and a power transmission line and caused a large-scale fire. No casualties were reported.power outages Several cars were also heavily damaged. A sunflower oil production plant of the American company Bunge Global was hit. Dnipro Mayor Borys Filatov claimed (this resulted in) 300 tonnes of oil had spilled onto roads making the city's embankment road unusable for about two to three days. However, utility workers cleaned up the streets earlier than expected and trafic resumed the next day. According to city officials this swift cleunup prevented an ecological disaster since the oil had not reached the Dnipro river. Ukrainian Foreign Minister Andrii Sybiha claimed on 6 January 2026 that the attack on the Bunge plant was not accidental and he assessed that Russia was systematically attacking American businesses in Ukraine.

In the evening of 6 January Dnipro was hit by a large-scale drone attack. Eight people were injured in the attack. A vocational school was damaged, two kindergarten and a music school, in ten apartment buildings almost all windows were smashed, numerous cars were burned-out, the heating networks near one of the residential buildings was damaged and two trolleybuses were damaged. About about 25 tons of debris and glas had to be removed from the streets. The Shevchenkivskyi and Sobornyi Districts suffered the most from the attack. On 8 January 2026 Mayor Filatov declared a national emergency in the city, power engineers were gradually restoring power to hospitals, the left bank of the city was powered by backup sources and work was ongoing to restore heat and water supplies in many city districts. The rest of Dnipropetrovsk Oblast was almost completely without electricity due to Russian attacks on Ukraine's energy infrastructure. Also because of the power outages caused by the attack school holidays in Dnipro were extended for another two days. At the evening of 8 January Mayor Filatov reported that water, electricity and heating supply had been restored while the trolleybuslines would not restarted until stable power returned to traction substations.

In the evening of 10 January Dnipro was hit by a drone attack. One man was injured. Two garages were hit and burned out, 27 others were damaged. More than 50,000 people were left without electricity. Additionally, in nine apartment blocks nearly 400 windows were smashed. In the morning of 12 January water and power supply had not been restored in several city districts on left bank of the city. Late afternoon (of 12 January) 18,000 families remained without electricity. On 13 January some parts of the left bank of the city were still without electricity. Generators were supplied to provide electricity to buildings.

In the night of 19 to 20 January Dnipro a Russian attack caused an enterprise was damaged and set on fire. Windows in a high-rise building were broken and five cars were damaged. A boiler house that provided heat to 90 homes, 10 educational institutions, and 2 hospitals was also damaged to such an extent that ten streets were left without heating. Two women were injured in the attack.

Midday on 22 January a Russian drone hit a 16-story building in Dnipro. 14 people were injured. 16 people had to be rescued from the upper floors of the building. The building was partially destroyed and two apartments with a total area of 200 square metro caught fire.

=== February 2026 ===
In the early hours of 1 February a Russian UAV strike killed a man and a woman in their home. Their house was destroyed and two others damaged. And also a car was damaged.

In the night of 2 to 3 February Dnipro was hit by ballistic missiles and drones. A thermal power plant used exclusively to heat residential areas was attacked and damaged for the ninth time. In a dormitory for displaced persons took damage and it's 85 windows were broke, a three-story residential building and two private homes were also damaged. A car parked in a yard also took damage. No human casualties were reported. The strike caused problems with heat supply, about 8,600 subscribers were left without heat.

=== April 2026 ===
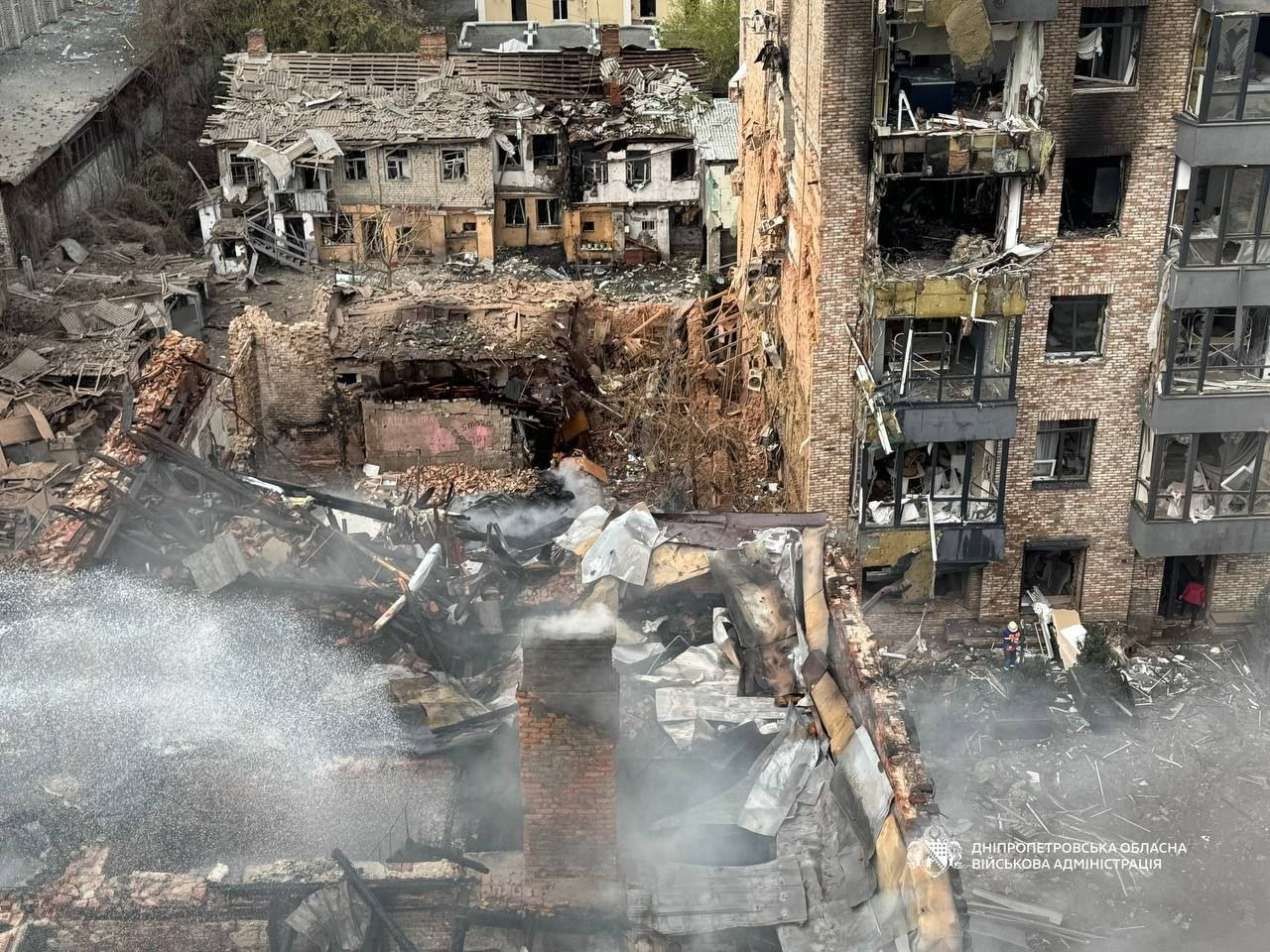
Destructions in Dnipro after Russian attack, April 2026

On 25 April 2026, Russian forces launched a large-scale overnight drone and ballistic missile attack on the city of Dnipro, as part of a wider wave of strikes across the country. The assault, carried out in several waves, targeted residential areas and civilian infrastructure, causing significant destruction. At least 10 people were killed and 49 injured.

=== August 2026 ===
On 7 August 2026, Russian forces struck a World Health Organization (WHO) humanitarian aid warehouse, destroying it. 5 people were killed and 16 injured in the attack on the Dnipro region.

=== October 2026 ===
In the afternoon of 29 October 2026, Russian forces struck the Dnipro railway station with one rocket-propelled UAV after three others were shot down. The attack hit the platform near where train No. 866, which goes on the Dnipro to Zaporizhzhia route, was located at the time. At least 14 people were killed due to the strike, and another 10 to 14 were wounded. Of the wounded, around 6 were in the hospital in serious condition. In a statement on X, the French president, Emmanuel Macron, expressed his condolences to the Ukrainian people over the attack.

== See also ==
- Kyiv strikes (2022–present)
- Kharkiv strikes (2022–present)
- Odesa strikes (2022–present)
