= Armavir Air Base =

Airport in Krasnodar Krai, Russia

Armavir
- Armavir, Krasnodar Krai in Russia
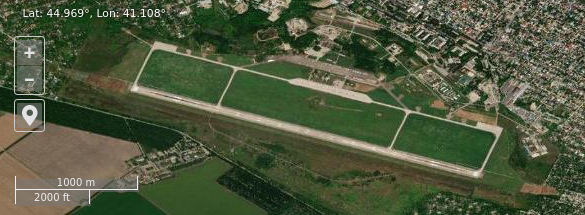
- Satellite imagery of Armavir air base

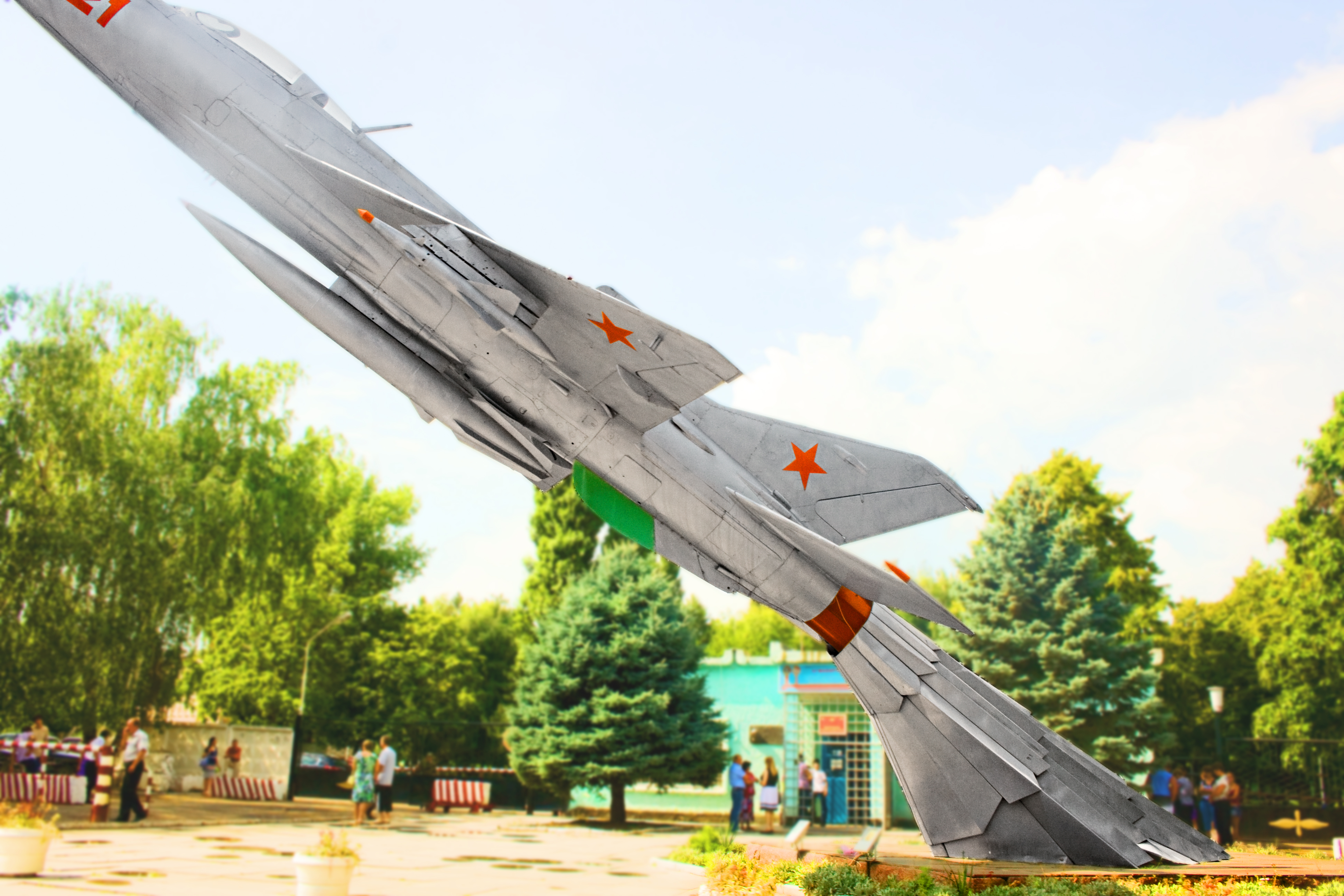
- MiG-21 monument at Armavir air base entrance

Site information
- Type: Air Base
- Owner: Ministry of Defence
- Operator: Russian Aerospace Forces

Location
- Shown within Krasnodar Krai Armavir (Russia)
- Coordinates: 44°58′09″N 41°06′29″E

Site history
- In use: -present

Airfield information
- Identifiers: ICAO: URKR
- Elevation: 83 metres (272 ft) AMSL
Runways
Direction	Length and surface
10/28	2,500 metres (8,202 ft) Concrete

Armavir is a military airfield in Krasnodar Territory, located on the southern outskirts of the city Armavir. The 713th Training Aviation Regiment (Military Unit Number 78738) is based at the aerodrome, which is part of the 783rd Training Center. The regiment instructors provide training for fighter aircraft on the Yak-130 L-39 and MiG-29 aircraft.

An airfield (the second in the immediate area) was built on the eve of the war during the creation of the Armavir Military Aviation School of Pilots. The official start date for the formation of the school is December 1, 1940, the annual holiday of the unit is set for February 23, 1941.

The Armavir Military Aviation School of Pilots and its three regiments were transferred to the Soviet Air Defence Forces in 1960.

As of 2014 the possibility is being discussed of creating an Armavir airport by reconstructing the military aerodrome and bringing it into compliance with the standards of civil aviation aerodromes.

== Accidents and incidents ==
- September 14, 2006: in the area of Armavir city, a L-39 training aircraft crashed during a scheduled training flight. A cadet ejected and the pilot-instructor Dmitry Khrebtov died.
- February 1, 2008: a L-39 crashed. During the performance of a flight task, the engine stopped. After two unsuccessful attempts to restart, the pilot took the plane to a safe area and Second-class pilot Major Serov safely ejected.
- September 4, 2014: in the Armavir region, during a training flight of a MiG-31 aircraft, the landing gear did not lower during the approach to landing. Both pilots ejected and managed to survive. According to the official representative of the Russian Defense Ministry Igor Konashenkov, the pilots were quickly found and taken by helicopter to the base airfield.

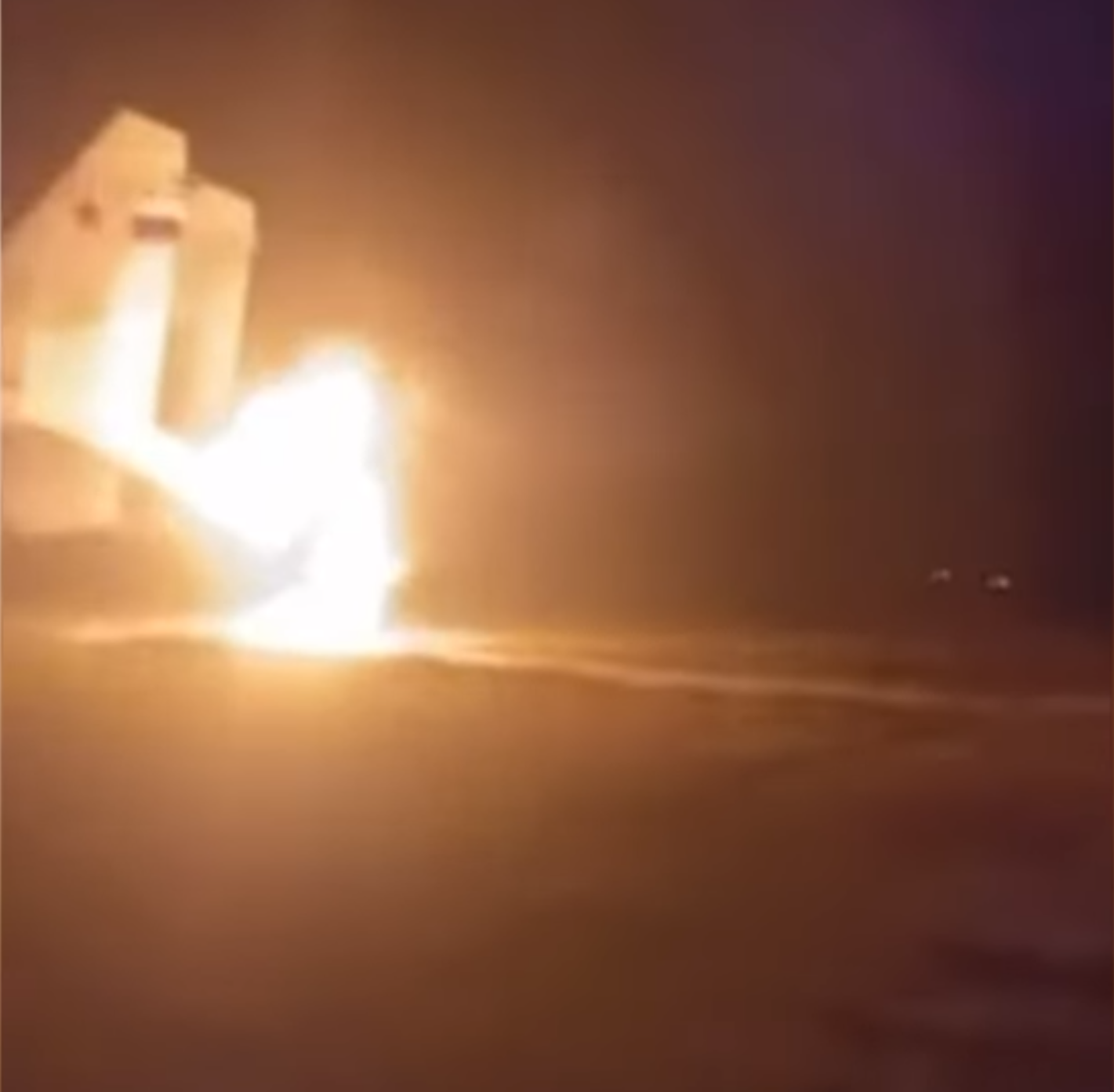
Su-27UB on fire at Armavir air base

- 26 July, 2025: During the Russian invasion of Ukraine Ukraine's Main Directorate of Intelligence published footage along with a claim that during the night an operative had burned down a two-seat Su-27UB combat trainer.

== See also ==
- List of military airbases in Russia
