= Meteor Palace of Sports =

Sports complex in Dnipro, Ukraine

Ice Palace of Sports "Meteor"
- Палац спорту "Метеор". Дніпро
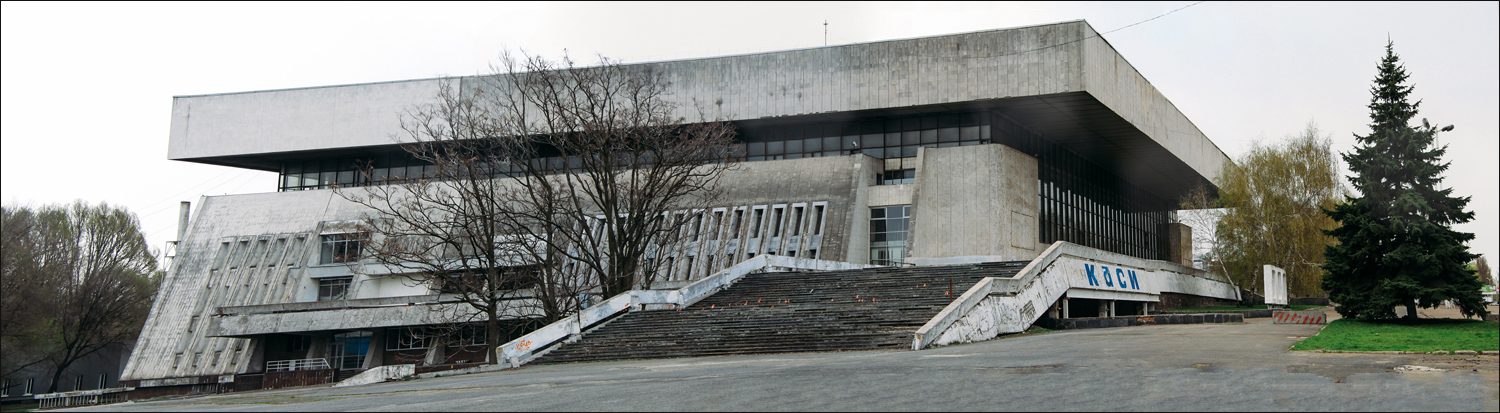
- Interactive map of Ice Palace of Sports "Meteor"
- Location: Dnipro, Ukraine
- Coordinates: 48.4356°N 35.0056°E
- Owner: State company "Yuzhmash"
- Capacity: Ice hockey: 5,500

Construction
- Opened: 1980

Ice Palace of Sports "Meteor" (Ukrainian: Палац спорту «Метеор», romanized: Palats sportu Meteor) is a multifunctional facility located in city of Dnipro, Ukraine. Built in 1980, it is one of major ice hockey venues in the country with seating capacity of 6,000. The arena is part of the Sports Complex Meteor.

== History ==
The venue was originally designated for ice rink sports (i.e. figure skating, ice hockey) and has two ice rinks, yet later it was transformed into multifunctional facility providing training site for basketball, martial arts, badminton and other sports. In 2013 it was closed for reconstruction for the 2015 EuroBasket, but the construction was later suspended.

It is used by HC Dniprovski Vovky and sometimes by a basketball team BC Dnipro.

The size of a rink is 61x30. The training rink is the same size with a seating capacity of 300 and located behind the arena.

== See also ==
- Sports Complex Meteor
