= Dnipro House of Organ and Chamber Music =

Church and concert venue in Dnipro, Ukraine

- Дніпровський Будинок органної та камерної музики
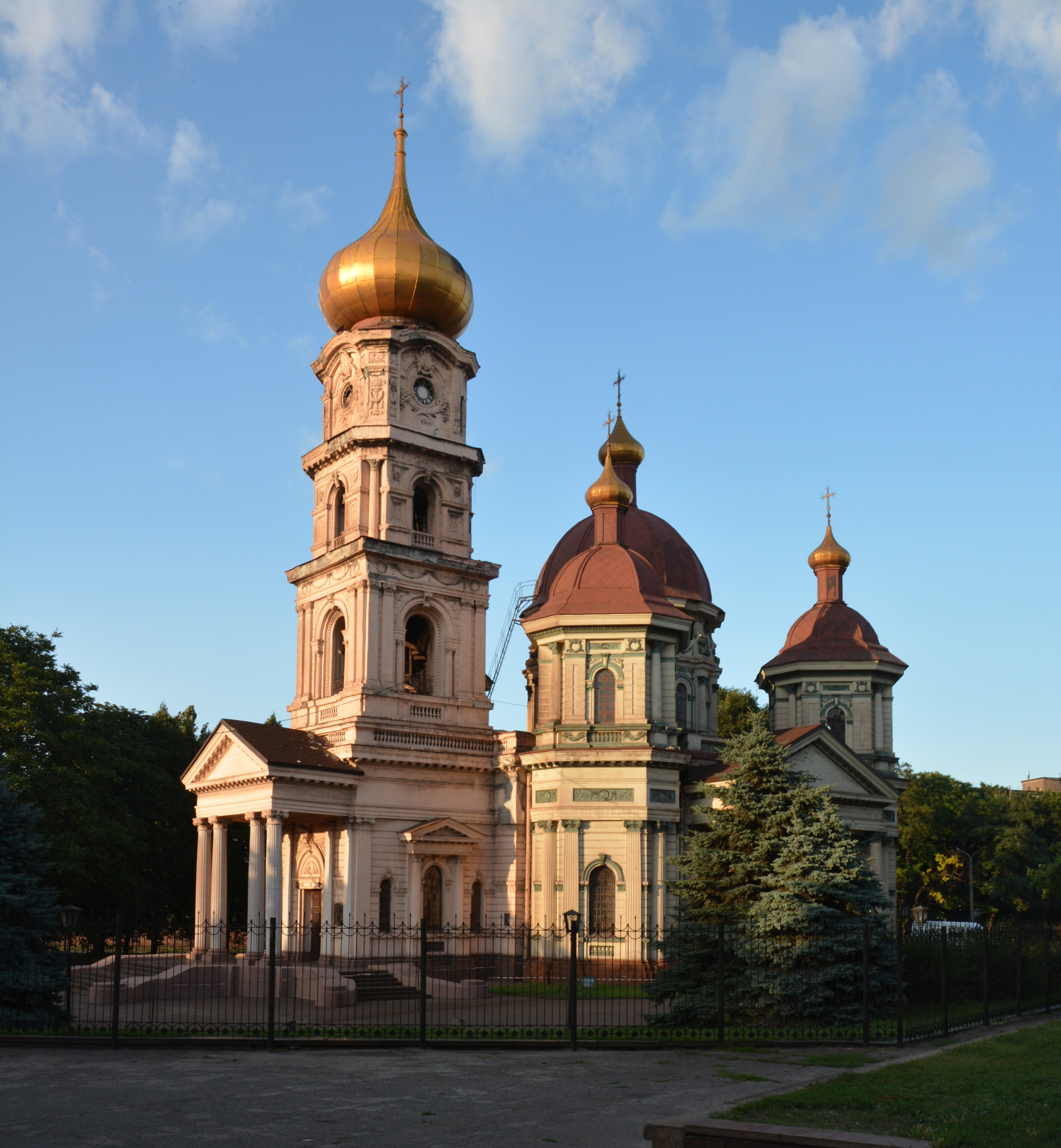
- The building in 2015
- Interactive map of Dnipro House of Organ and Chamber Music
- Former names: Bryansk Church
- Address: Serhiia Nihoiana Ave; Dnipro; Ukraine
- Location: Dnipro, Dnipropetrovsk Oblast, Ukraine
- Coordinates: 48.4770882°N 34.9862261°E
- Type: Church and concert venue

Construction
- Built: 1913–1915
- Opened: 1987
- Renovated: 1986
- Architect: Heorgii Turovets

Website
- www.domorgan.dp.ua

Immovable Monument of National Significance of Ukraine
- Official name: Брянська (Миколаївська) церква (Дніпропетровський будинок органної та камерної музики) (Bryansk (St. Nicholas) Church (Dnipropetrovsk House of Organ and Chamber Music))
- Type: Architecture, History
- Reference no.: 040024-Н

The Dnipro House of Organ and Chamber Music (Ukrainian: Дніпровський Будинок органної та камерної музики, romanized: Dniprovskyi Budynok orhannoi ta kamernoi muzyky) or the Bryansk Church of Saint Nicholas in Dnipro, is a 20th-century Eastern Orthodox cathedral of the Ukrainian Orthodox Church (UOC) and concert venue in Dnipro, Ukraine. Additionally, the building itself is a architectural and historic monument of national significance. Because of its position on the grounds of the hamlet Briansky close to the metallurgical plant in the western portion of Dnipropetrovsk, people quickly gave it the moniker Brianska.

The establishment of the house marked the start of a new era in Dnipro's cultural life. This is the European level of the organ and chamber music era. Renowned European and international musicians take the stage there, transforming the perception of the area.

== Design ==
The building was designed by Poltava provincial church architect Heorgii Turovets in a neoclassical style with baroque characteristics to commemorate the 300th anniversary of the Romanovs' rule. Five domes and a three-tiered bell tower with a clock were features of the cross-shaped church. The outside and interior were embellished with authentic stucco. Yevstafii Kostiantynovych, an architect and artist from Saint Petersburg, was responsible for the interior design and, in particular, for the golden iconostasis, which was made in the Rastrelli style. Mykhailo Ivanov created paintings for the cathedral. Electric lights and a steam heating system were features of the structure.

== History ==
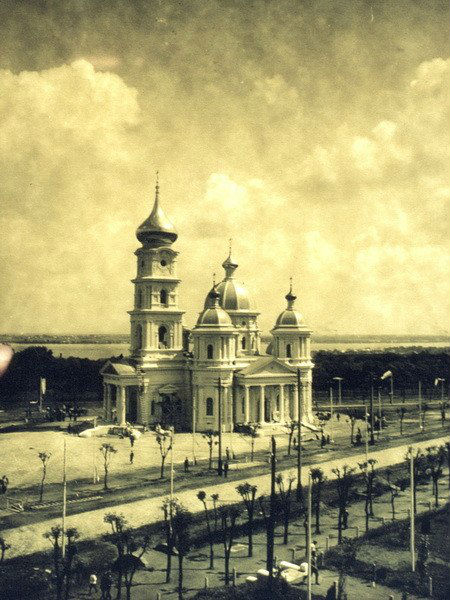
Bryansk Church seen in 1915

Built between 1913 and 1915, the church had no connection to organ music at first. It was the Bryansk (Saint Nicholas) church. Even though the First World War broke out in the fall of 1914, the chapel was completed in just 28 weeks on the outskirts of the city. However, the church and several other places of worship were shut down by the Bolsheviks when they seized control of Ukraine. An exhibition of Petrovsky-named metallurgical plant samples was held at the end of 1932; however, a year later, the Monument was moved to the factory House of Pioneers and Schoolchildren for the children's technical station. For a long period during the second half of the 1930s, the building was used as a coal storehouse and a home for pioneers.

The church was reverted to the religious community between 1941 and 1961. The structure suffered only little damage during World War II (shattered windows and a partially destroyed roof above the altar area). Early in the decade of the 1960s, it became the Children's Sports School No.4 was the new location for the monument, which already has a number of amenities established. But the building already required significant repairs in the 1970s, thus it was moved to the balance of the Construction and Repair Management.

The church was only listed to the state's register of architectural monuments at the end of the 1970s, at the local community's request. Additionally, a decision was taken to convert the old church into an organ hall and restore its original architectural aspect in the early 1980s. This is how the building's new life as a center of culture and the organ and classical music scene at the European level in Dnipro started.

1986 saw the building's restoration. Viacheslav Danylov and Serhii Isaiev, two Ukrainian painters, painted new paintings since the originals were destroyed. A year following the renovation, the organ—which was made by the German company Sauer—was being placed. Delivered from Frankfurt to Dnipro was a 12 tonnes (12 long tons; 13 short tons), two-manual mechanical organ with 30 registers and 2,074 pipes of different sizes and lengths.

The House of Organ and Chamber Music has played home to several international festivals, competitions, and tours featuring artists from Europe and throughout the globe since its inaugural performance on 27 April 1987. Every year, some 300 performances took place here, drawing in over 30,000 people. For 35 years, 70 musicians, 4 orchestras, 4 quartets, and 2 lecture rooms dedicated to music have produced art and served as a source of inspiration for the public.

The facility was made available for worship to the UOC-MP community on 26 August 2010, as per the settlement agreement signed by the Economic Court of the Dnipropetrovsk area. However, this was contingent upon guaranteeing the uninterrupted operation of the House of Organ and Chamber Music. After the religious community took ownership of the temple building in 2011, they redesigned a portion of the basements to accommodate an Orthodox church. Regular church services have been conducted in the temple's basement since 14 March 2013.

Concert nights honoring the spring festivals and Passover were hosted by the House of Organ and Chamber Music. There was a concert titled 25 Years on the Musical Olympus on 30 April 2014. Employees of cultural organizations and representatives of Dniepropetrovsk's national minorities were invited to the event.

During the Russian invasion of Ukraine on 11 March 2022, the well-known device temporarily stopped working. Fragments of shell struck the House of Organ and Chamber Music's windows and walls on 22 March 2022, the nationally significant architectural landmark made a partial recovery. The building was again hit in a Russian attack on the city on 24 June 2025. A blast wave shattered 2 large and over 40 small stained glass windows. The normal programing resumed after the attack. The third strike was on the night of June 15, 2026. Not only the building was damaged, but also the unique organ.

== Gallery ==
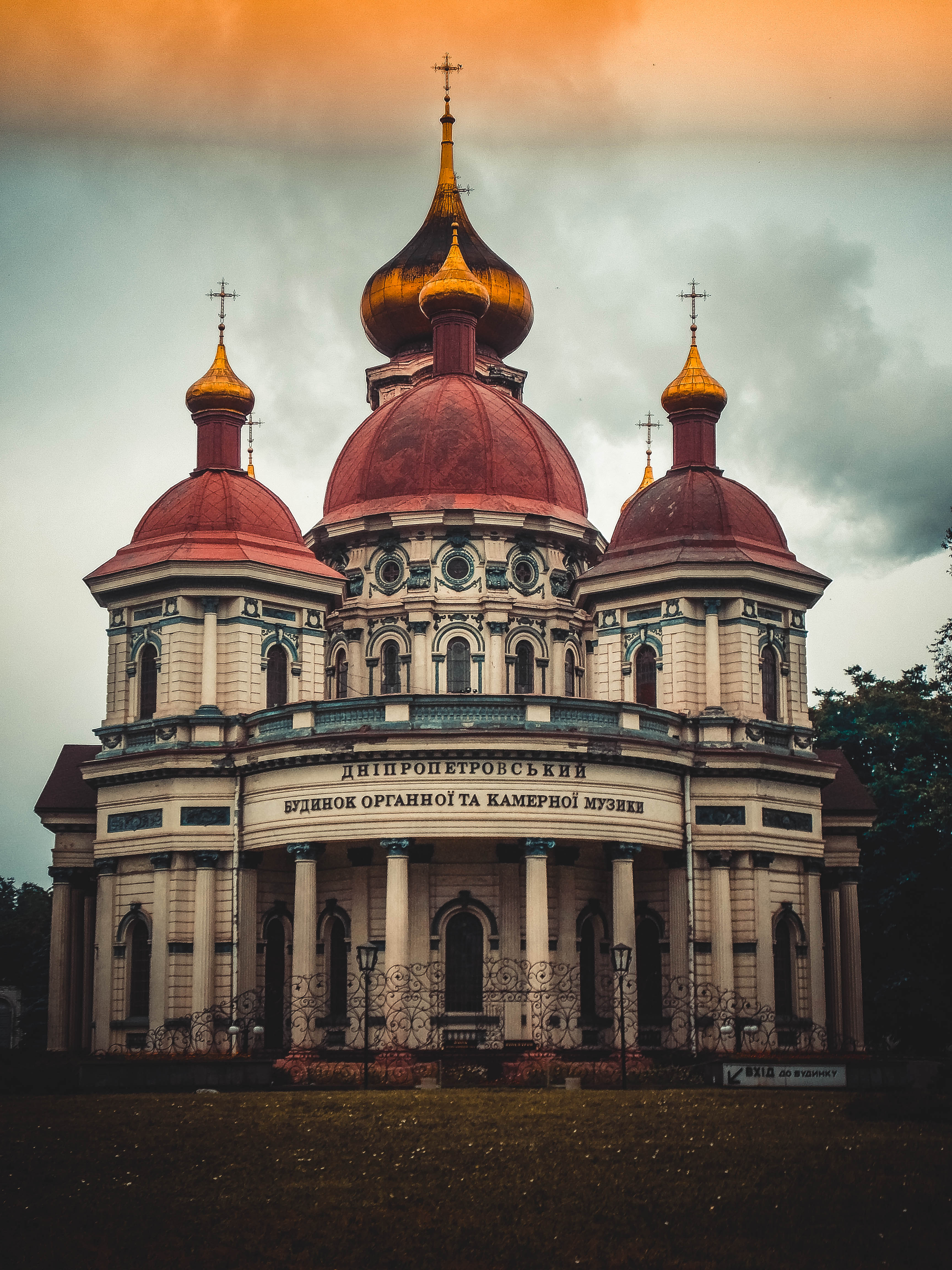
View of the church's three domes in 2015

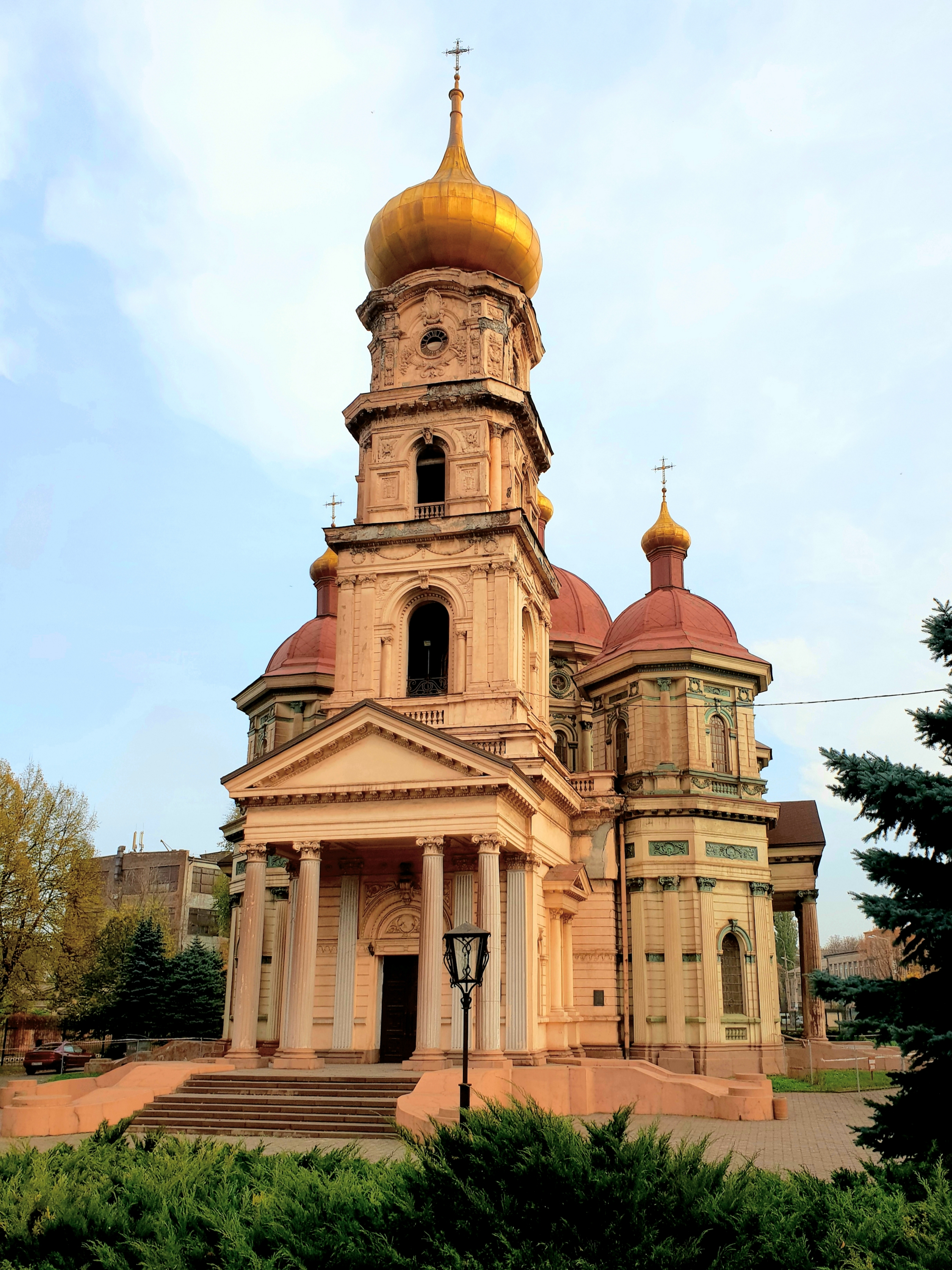
The church's bell tower in 2018

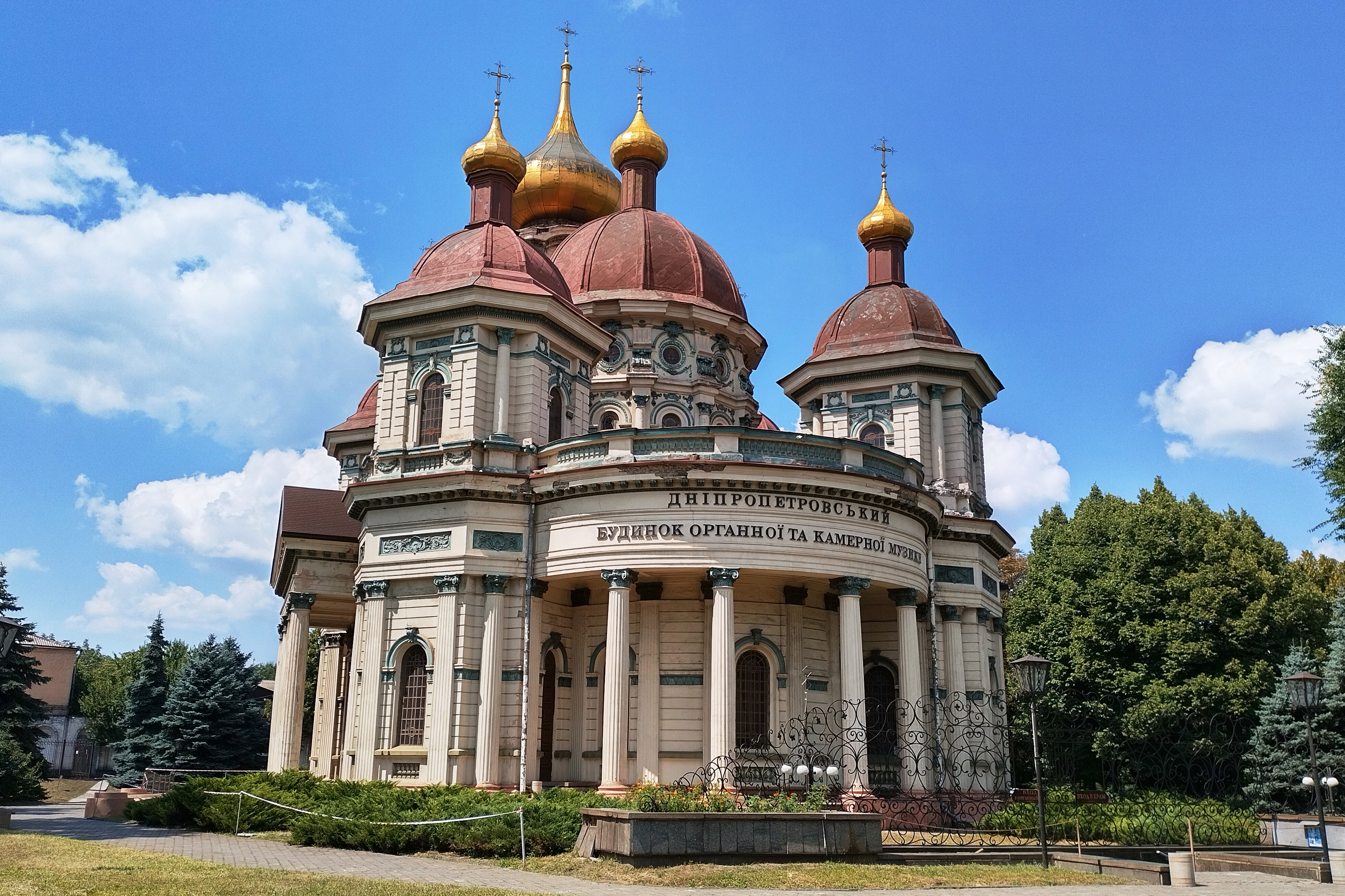
The church in 2021

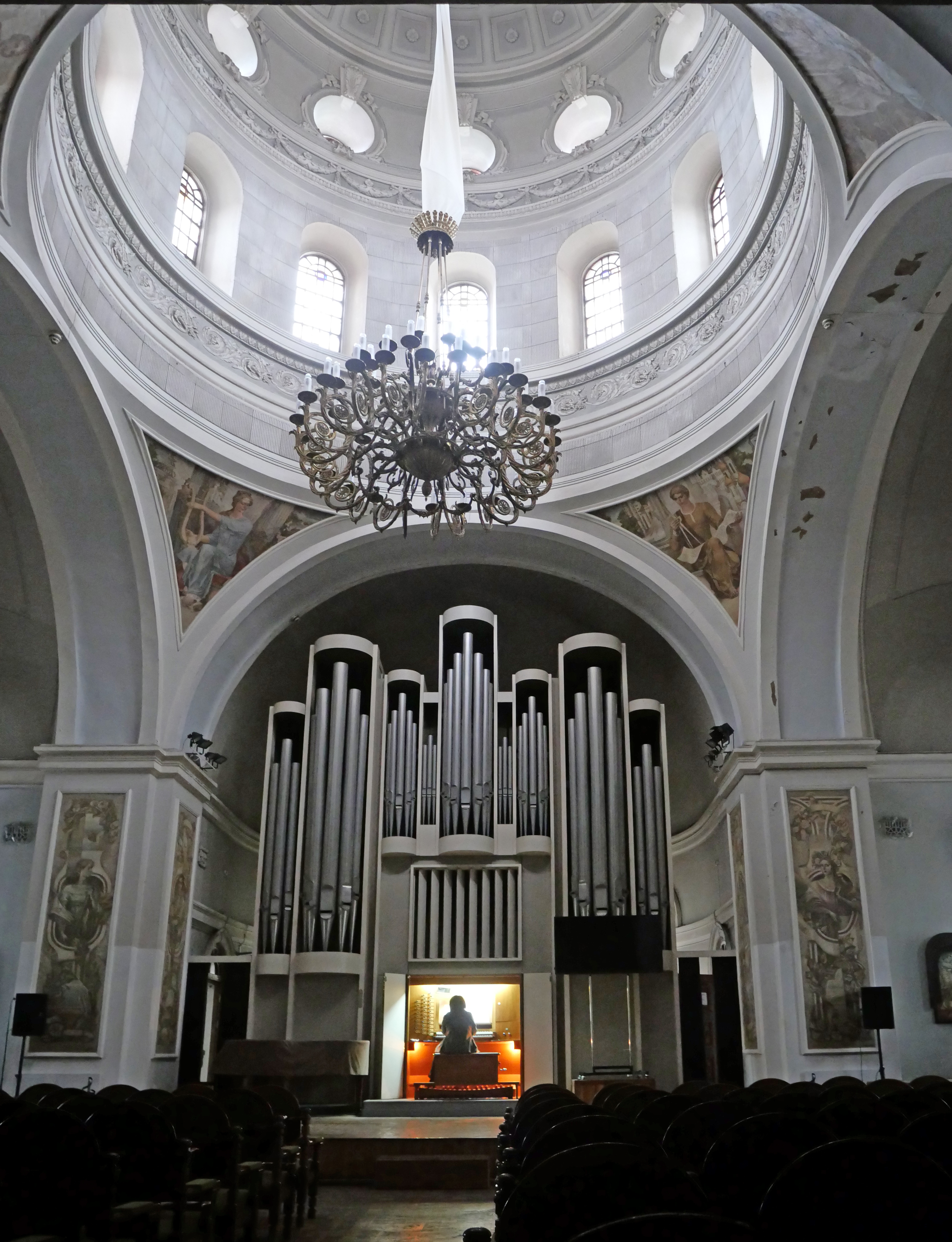
The church's organ in 2021

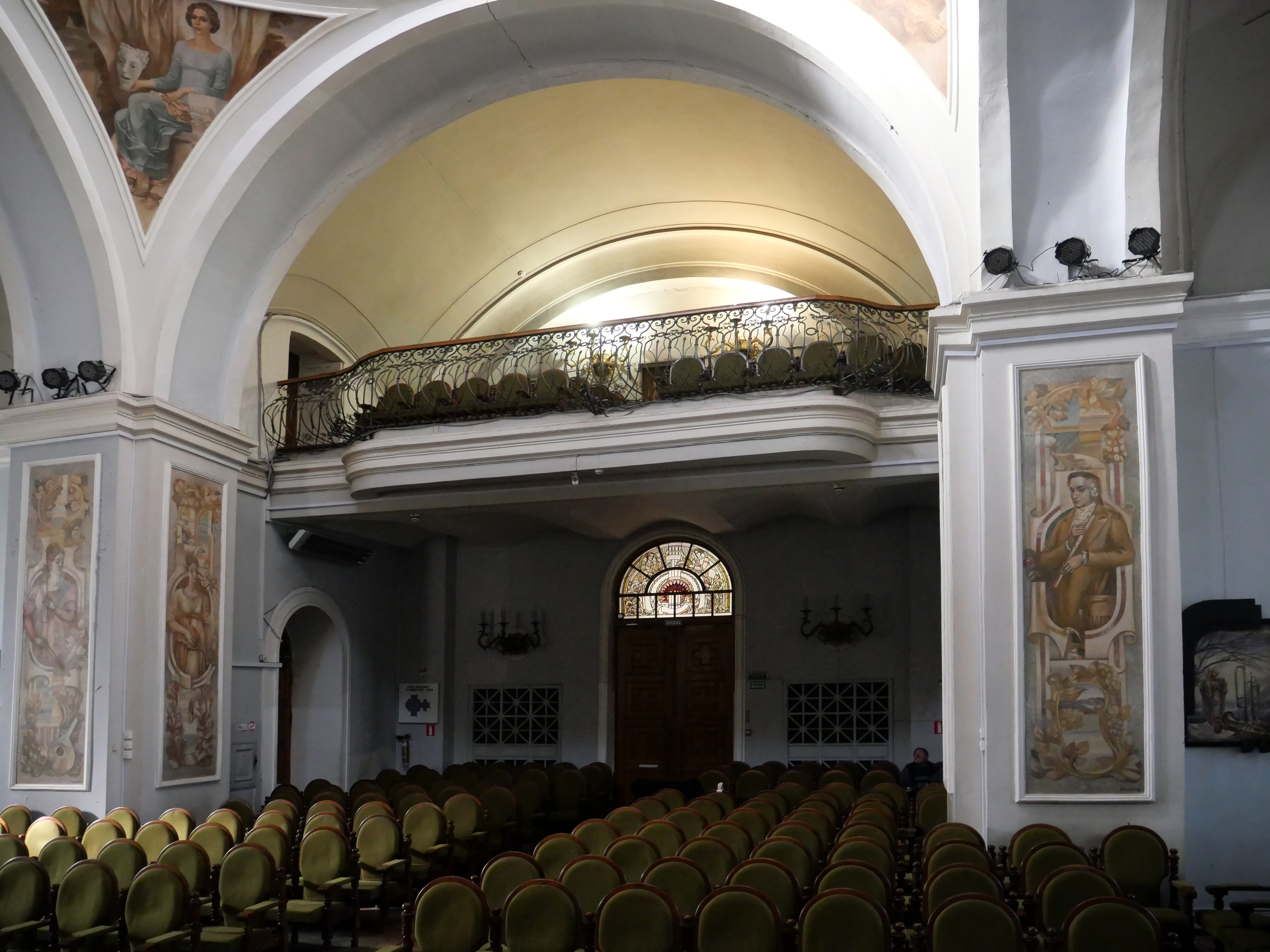
Interior of the church in 2023

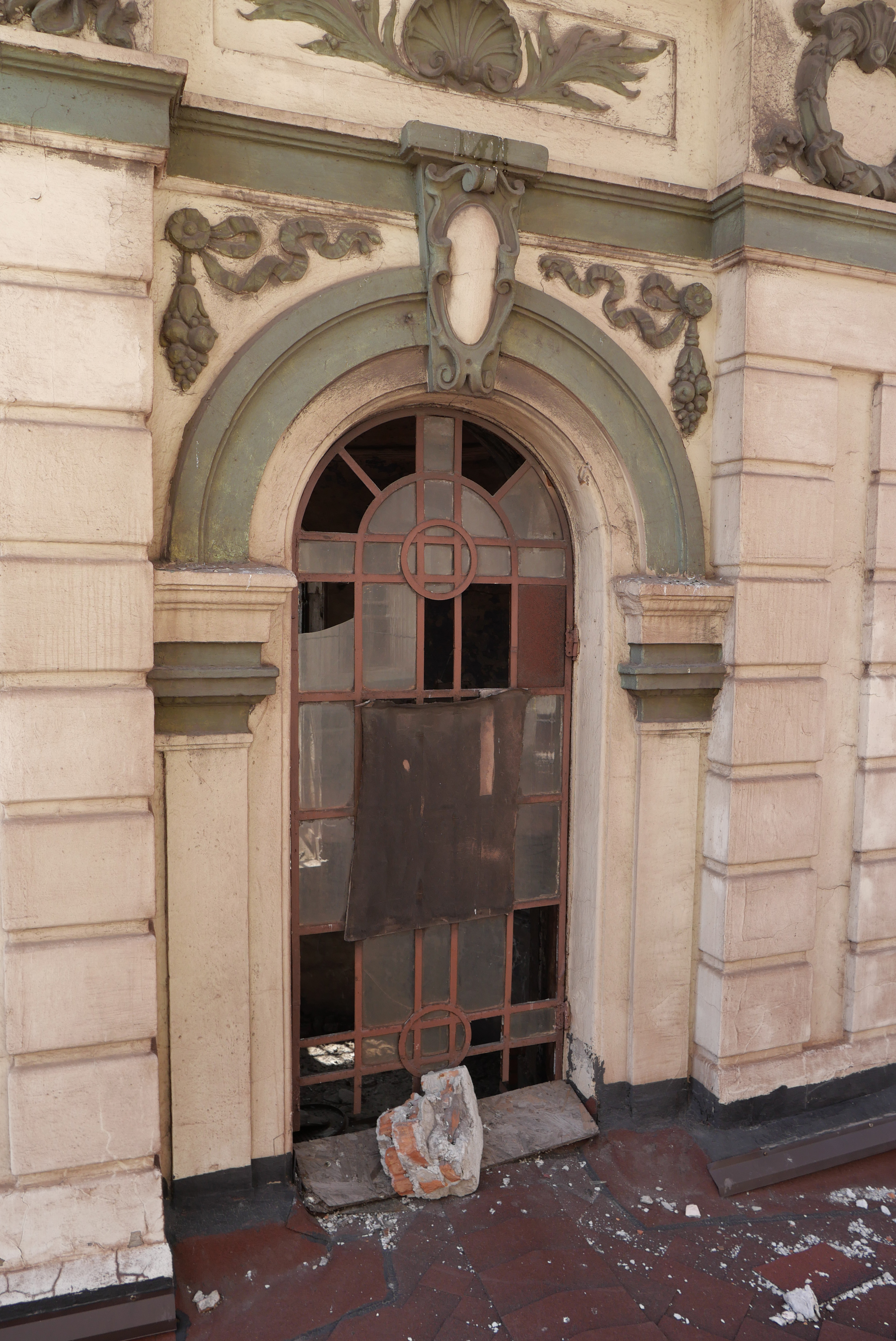
Windows shattered by the blast wave, fragments of decorative trim on the roof after the 2022 strike.

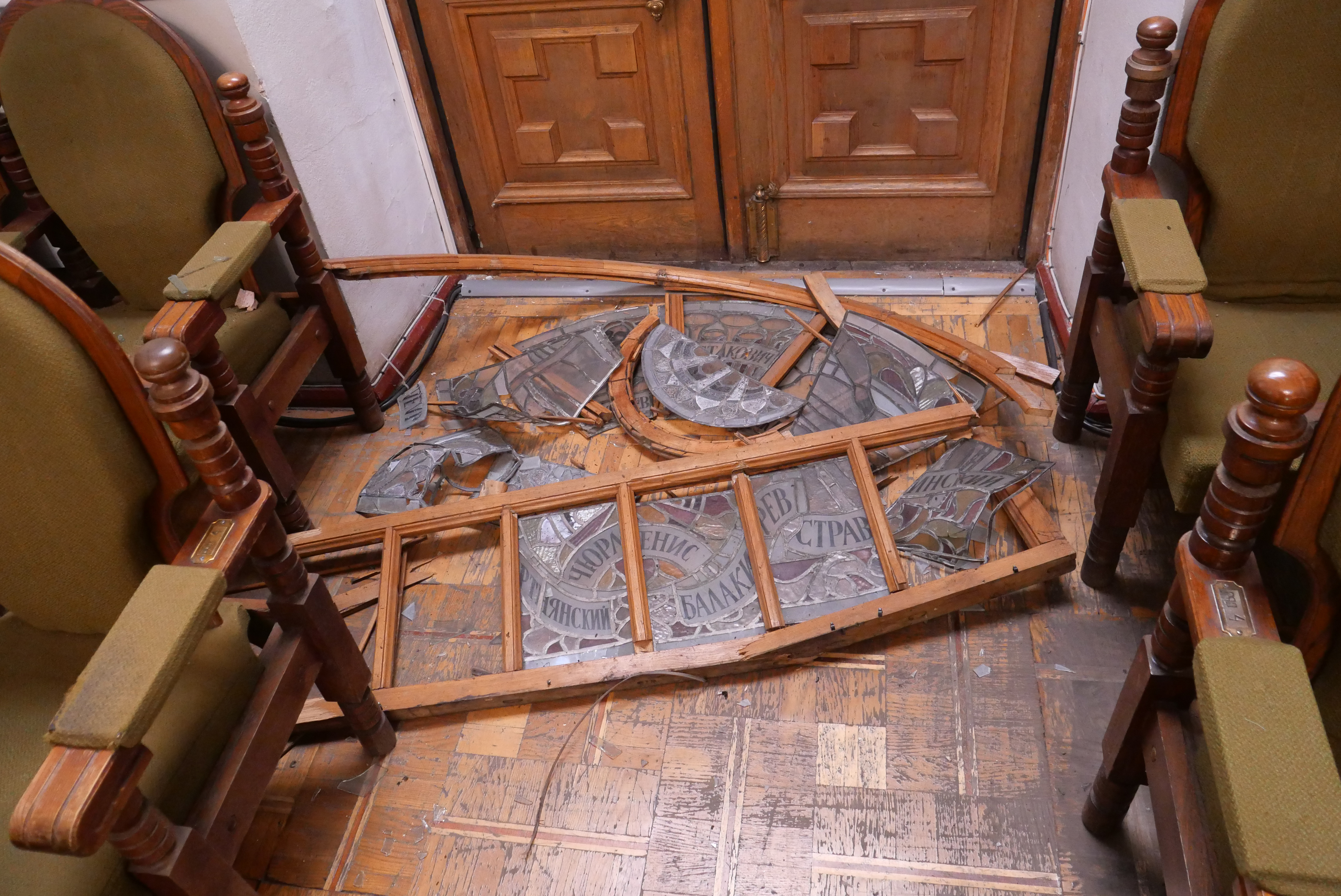
Remains of the stained glass window from the transom above the door on the south side after the 2022 strike.
