= Sports Complex Meteor =

Sports venue in Dnipro, Ukraine

Sports Complex Meteor (Ukrainian: Спортивний комплекс Метеор, romanized: Sportynvyi kompleks Meteor) is the biggest center of sports and cultural life in Dnipro, Ukraine. The complex is a home to the Olympic and Paralympic teams of Ukraine with status national since October 10, 2001. Meteor belongs to the State Company "Production Union Southern Machine-building Factory of Makarov" (Yuzhmash) and Sports Club Meteor. Sports Club Meteor was established in 1962.

== Composition ==
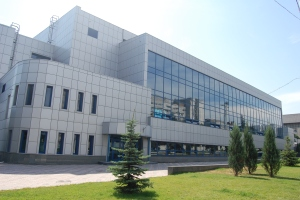
Palace of water sports Meteor

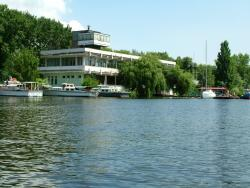
Machine-builder water sports facility

The complex includes:

- Stadium Meteor (1966)
- Palace of water sports Meteor (1970, main pool)
- Ice Palace of Sports Meteor (1980)
- Machine-builder water sports facility (1958) is located in a remote location (Shevchenko City Park, Monastyrskyi Island)

The Meteor is home to five sports schools four of which are the Olympic reserves and another one is a complex school that specialized in six sports.

== History ==
The stadium was opened in 1966 and reconstructed in 2001. The Palace of water sports was opened in 1970 and closed for reconstruction in 2003. The Ice Palace of Sports was opened in 1983. By 2019, the sports complex fell into disrepair. In the end of 2021, a new reconstruction began. The complex was intended to open in 2023.

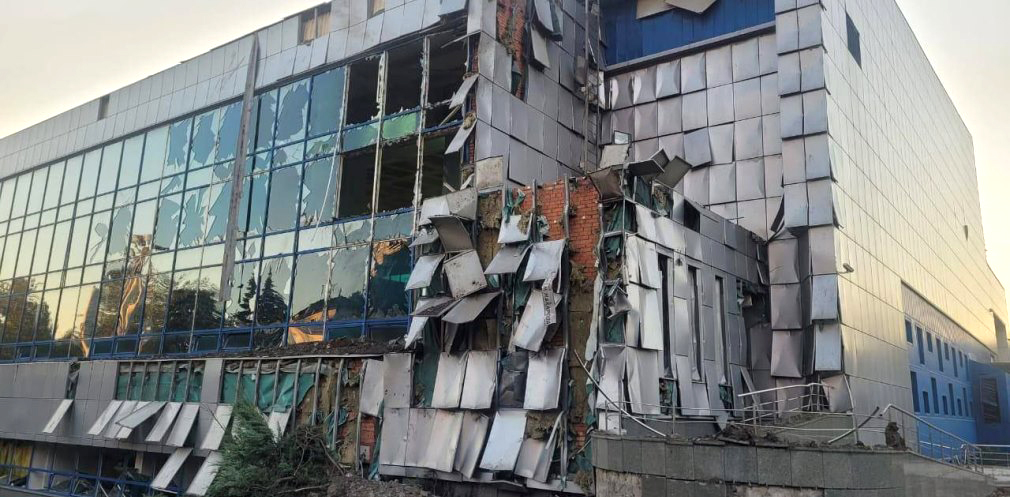
The Palace of water sports after missile attack

On 15 August 2023, the Palace of water sports was damaged by Russian missile attack on the city.

SC Meteor Presidents

- 1962–1982: Anatoliy Haiduk
- 1982–1986: Yuriy Olkhovyk
- 1986–2009: Konstantin Vavilov
- 2009–present: Olga Dengina

== Notable sports people ==
- Lyudmila Shevtsova – Olympian champion in athletics at the 1960 Summer Olympics – Women's 800 metres
- Yury Zaitsev – Olympian champion in weightlifting at the 1976 Summer Olympics
- Oksana Baiul – Olympian champion in figure skating at the 1994 Winter Olympics
- Yevhen Braslavets and Ihor Matviyenko – Olympian champions in sailing at the 1996 Summer Olympics – Men's 470
