= Igor Konashenkov =

Russian military officer (born 1966)

- Игорь Конашенков
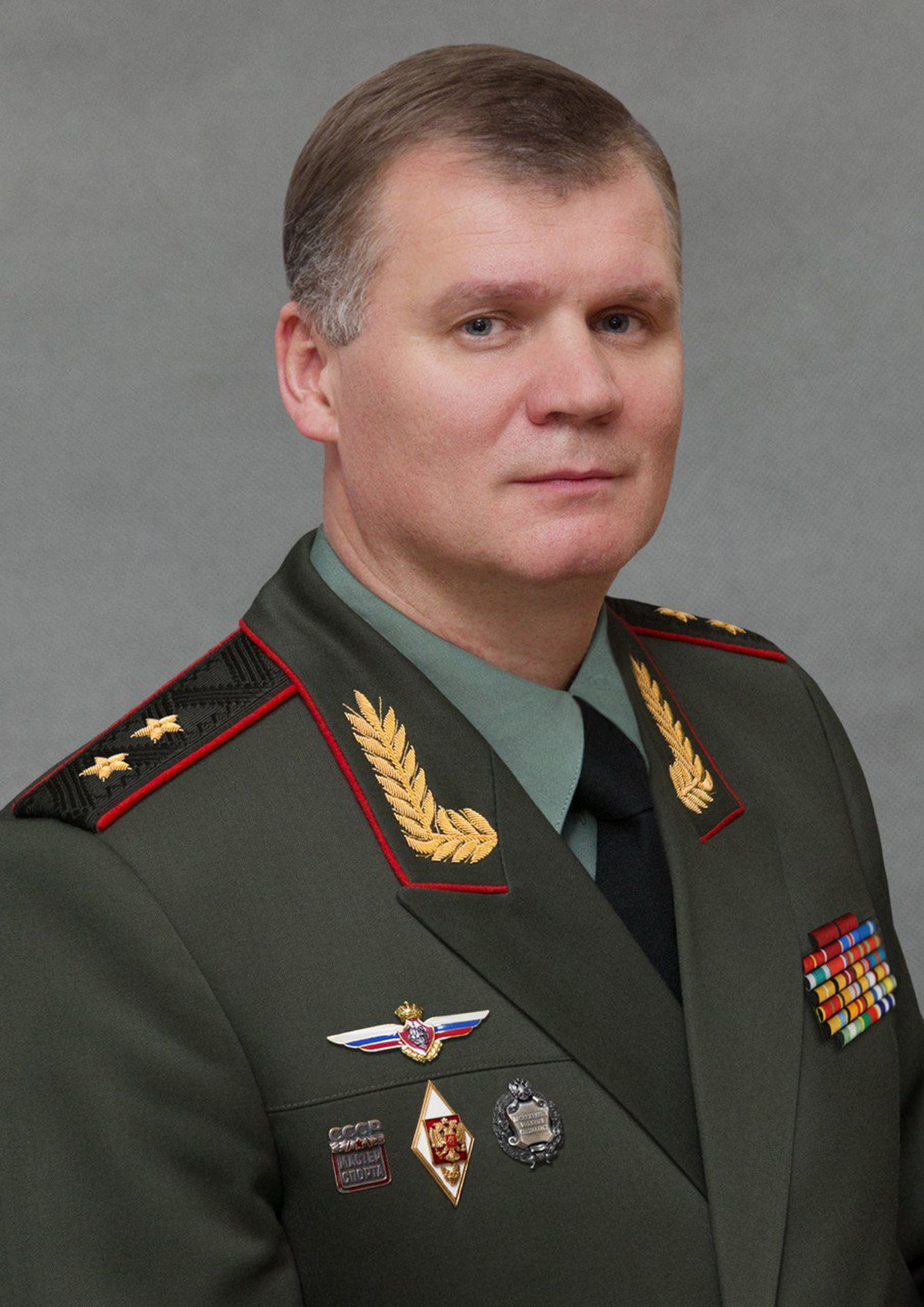
- Official portrait, 2013

Chief Spokesperson for the Russian Ministry of Defence
- Incumbent
- Assumed office 30 August 2011
- President: Dmitry Medvedev; Vladimir Putin
- Prime Minister: Vladimir Putin; Dmitry Medvedev; Mikhail Mishustin
- Defence Minister: Anatoly Serdyukov; Sergei Shoigu
- Preceded by: Office established

Personal details
- Born: May 15, 1966 (age 59) Kishinev, Moldavian SSR, Soviet Union (now Chișinău, Moldova)
- Party: United Russia
- Religion: Russian Orthodoxy

Military service
- Allegiance: Soviet Union; Russia
- Rank: Lieutenant general

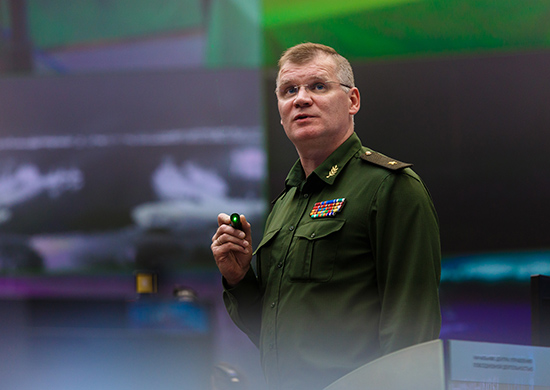
Konashenkov giving a briefing in 2015

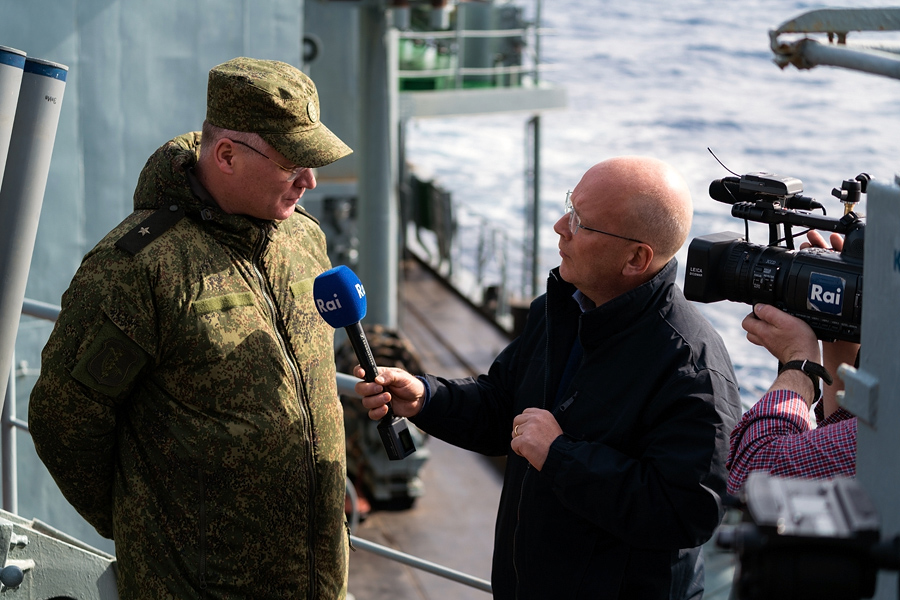
Konashenkov being interviewed during the deployment of the Russian Navy in the Mediterranean Sea, January 2016

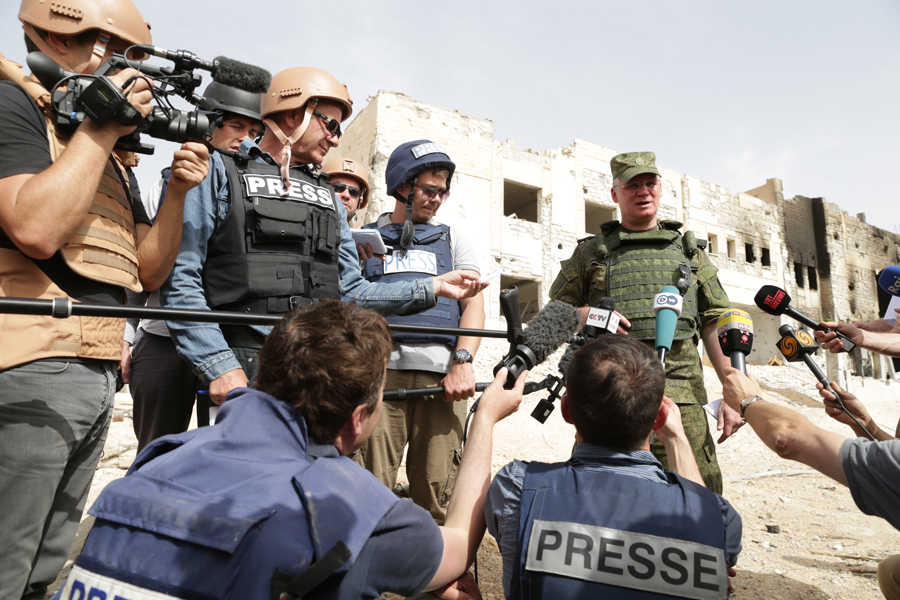
Konashenkov with journalists at El-Karjatein in Syria, April 2016

Lieutenant General Igor Yevgenyevich Konashenkov (Russian: Игорь Евгеньевич Конашенков; born 15 May 1966) is a Russian military officer serving as the Head of the Department of Information and Mass Communication of the Ministry of Defence of the Russian Federation.

== Early life ==
Igor Konashenkov was born on 15 May 1966 in Kishinev, Moldavian SSR, Soviet Union.

== Career ==
Konashenkov graduated with distinction from the engineering department of Zhytomyr Higher Military School of Radioelectronics of Air Defence in 1988. In 1998, he graduated from the Air Defence Military Academy. In 2006, he graduated from the higher courses of the Military Academy of the General Staff of the Armed Forces of Russia.

He has served in the Soviet Air Defence Forces and in the Russian Aerospace Defence Forces, in the directorate of the major command of the Territorial Air Defence Forces.

== Military spokesman ==
From 1998, Konashenkov was the senior officer, chief of group, and deputy chief of the Department for Cooperation with Russian and Foreign Media of the Russian Federation Ministry of Defence Press Service.

In 2003, he became chief of the press service and assistant commander of the North Caucasus Military District for public and media affairs. In 2005 he became chief of the press service of the army and assistant commander-in-chief of the army for public and media affairs.

In 2009, he was appointed deputy chief of the Department of Media Affairs and Information of the Russian Federation Ministry of Defence. In August 2011, he became chief of the Department of Media Affairs and Information of the Russian Federation Ministry of Defence. He is Russia's chief military spokesman.

He has headed units for informational support of the Russian military in the North Caucasus, and the Collective Force for Peacekeeping in the Georgia–Abkhazia conflict zone.

During the Russian invasion of Ukraine, Konashenkov claimed that U.S. forces had planned to infect birds in Ukraine with a spreadable form of the H5N1 flu strain "with a mortality rate of 50 percent" as well as Newcastle disease. He was promoted to the rank of Lieutenant General.

== Sanctions ==
In April 2022, Konashenkov was added to the European Union sanctions list "in response to the ongoing unjustified and unprovoked Russian military aggression against Ukraine and other actions undermining or threatening the territorial integrity, sovereignty and independence of Ukraine".

He was sanctioned by the UK government in 2022 in relation to the Russo-Ukrainian War.

== Honours ==
Konashenkov has received the Order of Courage, Order of Military Merit, Order of Friendship, and 14 other medals.

Konashenkov is a member of the presidium of the Union of Journalists in Moscow who awarded him a diploma for services to openness in the press in 2016.
