= Hennadii Lahuta =

Ukrainian politician (1974–2023)

- Геннадій Лагута
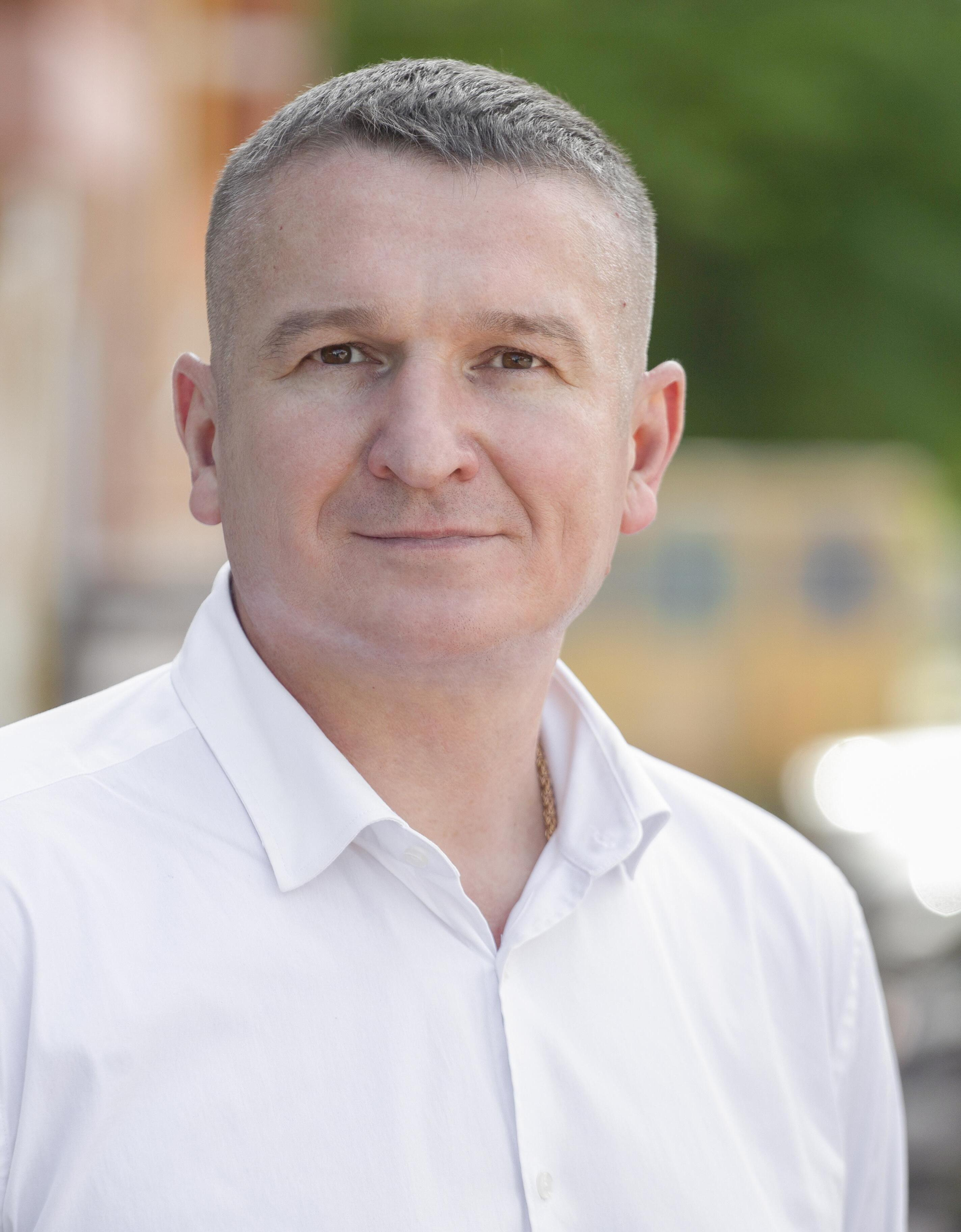
- Lahuta in 2021

Governor of Kherson Oblast
- In office 26 October 2021 – 9 July 2022; Disputed: 26 April – 9 July 2022 (Note: Control over Kherson Oblast is disputed due to the 2022 Russian invasion of Ukraine. Vladimir Saldo was installed by Russian forces on 26 April 2022, while Lahuta was still in office and remained loyal to the Ukrainian government. Lahuta was then replaced by Yaroslav Yanushevych.)
- President: Volodymyr Zelenskyy
- Preceded by: Serhiy Kozyr
- Succeeded by: Dmytro Butriy (acting); Yaroslav Yanushevych

Personal details
- Born: 10 August 1974 Berdiansk, Zaporizhzhia Oblast, Ukrainian SSR, Soviet Union
- Died: 17 September 2023 (aged 49) Kyiv, Ukraine
- Party: We Have to Live Here
- Other political affiliations: People's Party; Opposition Bloc
- Education: Berdiansk State Pedagogical University

Hennadii Mykolaiovych Lahuta (Ukrainian: Геннадій Миколайович Лагута; 10 August 1974 – 17 September 2023) was a Ukrainian politician who served as the governor of Kherson Oblast from 26 October 2021 to 9 July 2022. Lahuta was removed from office by the Russian military on 26 April 2022 during the Russian occupation of Kherson Oblast. He was removed from office by President Volodymyr Zelenskyy on 9 July. He was a member of the We Have to Live Here party headed by the mayor of Kherson Ihor Kolykhaiev.

== Political career ==
In the 2010 Ukrainian local elections, Lahuta was elected to the Chaplynka village council for the People's Party.

Lahuta was elected in the 2015 Ukrainian local elections into the Kherson Oblast Council for Opposition Bloc.

Lahuta was re-elected into the Kherson Oblast Council in the 2020 Ukrainian local elections for the local party We Have to Live Here.

Lahuta ran for the Verkhovna Rada (the national parliament of Ukraine) in the October 2021 early elections, to replace the mandate of Ihor Kolykhaiev. Kolykhaiev had given back his mandate won in constituency 184 (first past the post) in the 2019 Ukrainian parliamentary election to focus on his role as mayor of Kherson. Lahuta was the candidate of the party, led by Kolykhaiev, We Have to Live Here. Lahuta had been an assistant of Kolykhaiev in parliament. In the election campaign he withdraw his candidacy in favor of then Governor of Kherson Oblast Serhiy Kozyr of the party Servant of the People. In October 2021, Kozyr was elected into parliament, winning 62.6% of the vote (21,365 votes) Kozyr left the office of Governor on 26 October, being replaced by Lahuta.

On 24 February 2022, Russia invaded Ukraine. Immediately, Russian forces invaded Kherson Oblast, resulting in multiple Russian victories. On 2 March, Russian forces captured Kherson, the capital of the oblast. beginning a military occupation of the region. On 26 April 2022, Vladimir Saldo was appointed by the Russian military as head of the territory under their control, while Lahuta remained governor of the territory still held by Ukraine.

Lahuta was officially removed from office by President Volodymyr Zelenskyy on 9 July 2022.

== Death ==
Hennadii Lahuta died in Kyiv on 17 September 2023, at the age of 49.
