= Serhiy Kozyr =

Ukrainian politician (born 1984)

- Сергій Козир
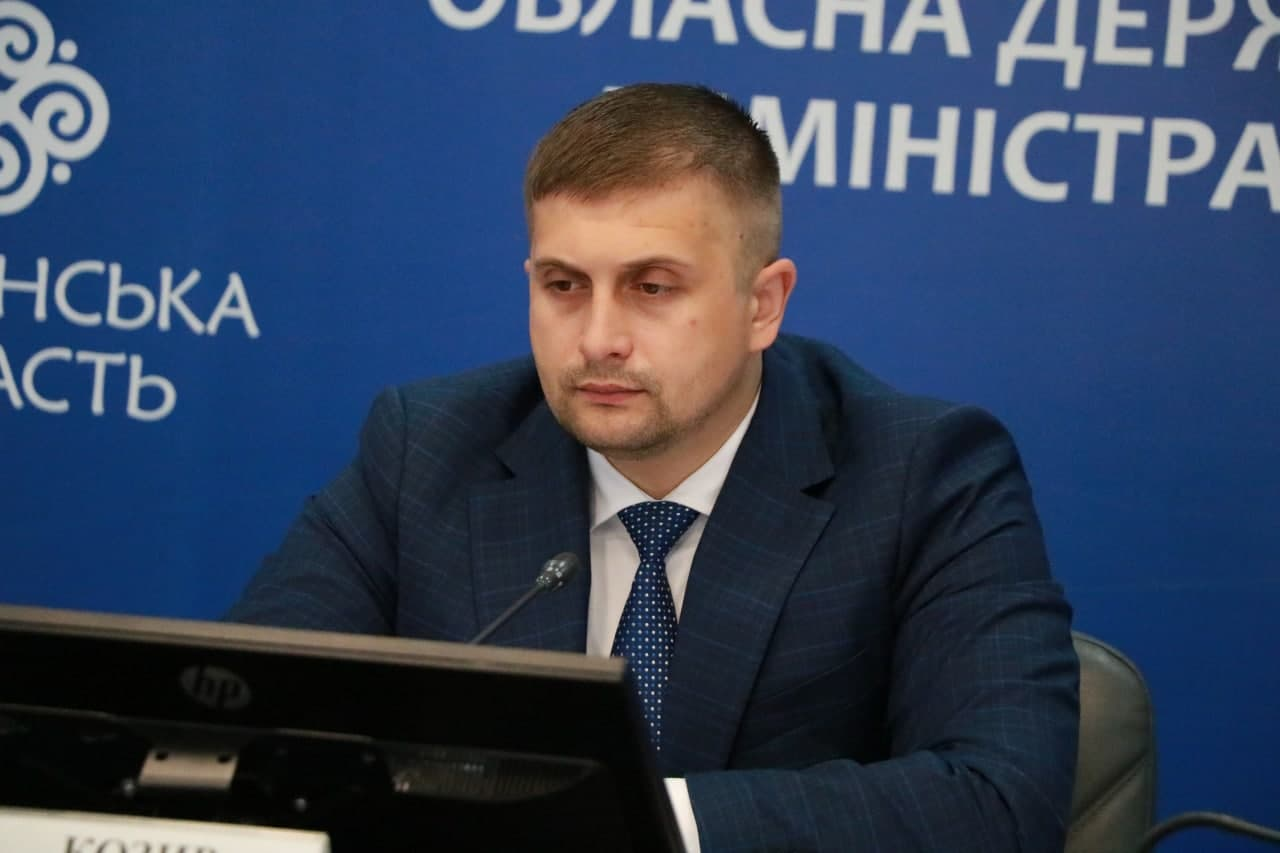

Member of the Verkhovna Rada
- Incumbent
- Assumed office 16 November 2021

Governor of Kherson Oblast
- In office 1 March 2021 – 26 October 2021
- Preceded by: Yuriy Husev
- Succeeded by: Hennadiy Lahuta

Governor of Kherson Oblast (acting)
- In office 3 December 2020 – 1 March 2021

Personal details
- Born: Serhiy Vyacheslavovych Kozyr; 20 June 1979 (age 46) Donetsk, Soviet Union
- Party: Servant of the People

Serhiy Vyacheslavovych Kozyr (Ukrainian: Сергій В'ячеславович Козир; born on 20 June 1984), is a Ukrainian politician who is currently a member of the Verkhovna Rada since 16 November 2021.

He had served as the governor of Kherson Oblast since 2020, before officially sworn into office on 1 March 2021 until 26 October 2021.

== Biography ==
Serhiy Kozyr was born in Donetsk on 20 June 1984.

Between September 2002 and December 2007, he studied at the Donetsk National Technical University, majoring in "Development of mineral deposits", master's degree in development of mineral deposits.

In July 2004, he became an apprentice miner for the repair of mining workings of the underground section of ventilation and safety equipment of the Trudivske mine management.

From August 2005 to March 2006 — mining foreman of the underground ventilation and safety equipment section of the Trudivske mine management.

From March to November 2006, he was assistant to the head of the underground ventilation and safety department of the Trudivske mine management department.

From November 2006 to October 2007, he was the deputy head of the underground ventilation and safety department of the Trudivske mine management.

From October 2007 to May 2008, he was the head of the underground coal mining section of ventilation and safety equipment of the Trudivske mine management. From May to June 2008, he was the assistant head of the underground coal mining section No. 2, From June to July 2008, he was the deputy head of the underground coal mining site No. 1, and from July 2008 to April 2010, he was the head of underground coal mining site No. 2.

In 2009, he graduated in absentia from the State Higher Educational Institution "Donetsk National Technical University", "Finance", specialist in finance.

From April to August 2010 - head of underground section No. 1, Zhovtnevy Rudnyk mine. From August 2010 to January 2011, he was the deputy director for production of the Zhovtnevy Rudnyk mine.

From January to August 2011, he was the head of the conveyor transportation department of the separate division "Trudivske Mining Department" of the state-owned enterprise "Donetsk Coal Energy Company" int Donetsk. From August 2011 to July 2014, he was the head of coal mining department No. 1, Trudivske Mine Department.

FRom January to March 2015, he was a mining foreman of the production structural unit "Pershotravenske Mine Management" of the public joint-stock company "DTEK Pavlogradvugilya", in Pavlograd, Dnipropetrovsk Oblast. From March to August 2015, he was the shift chief of production service No. 2 of the production structural unit of the separated structural unit "Mining Management" in the name of Heroes of the Cosmos" of the public joint-stock company "DTEK Pavlograd coal" in Pavlograd.

From September to November 2015, he was the chief miner for underground transport of the state enterprise "Donetsk Coal Energy Company", based in Donetsk. From November 2015 to June 2016, he was the acting director of the mine named after Kalinin, "Donetsk Coal Power Company", based in Donetsk. From June to August 2016, acting director of the mine of the separate unit "M.I. Kalinin Mine" of the state enterprise "Donetsk Coal Energy Company" in Donetsk. From August 2016 to March 2017, he was promoted to the director of the mine named after Kalinin. From March to April 2017, he was the acting director of production at the Donetsk coal-fired power company.

From April to July 2017, he became the director of the Mine named after Kalinin, in July to August 2017, he was the acting technical director — 1st deputy general director of the management of the state enterprise "Donetsk Coal Energy Company", in Donetsk.

From September to December 2017, he became the shift chief of the "Dniprovske" mine management, "DTEK Pavlogradvugillia", base in Pavlohrad, And from December 2017 to March 2019, he was the site chief.

From March to July 2019, unemployment benefits had been paid at the Pavlohrad micro-district employment center in Dnipropetrovsk Oblast. From July to August 2019, unemployment benefits had been paid at the Darnytsk district branch of the Kyiv City Employment Center.

=== Politics ===
From August to September 2019, he was an adviser to the patronage service of the Kherson regional state administration.

From September 5, 2019, to March 1, 2021, he was the deputy head of the Kherson regional state administration for regional development, infrastructure and ecology.

On 3 December 2020, Kozyr became the acting temporary acting Governor of Kherson Oblast, replacing Yuriy Husev.

On 1 March 2021, Kozyr was sworn into office.

On 20 September 2021, Kozyr ran for the Verkhovna Rada (the national parliament of Ukraine) in the October early elections, to replace Ihor Kolykhaiev. Kolykhaiev had given back his mandate won in constituency 184 (first past the post) in the 2019 Ukrainian parliamentary election to focus on his role as mayor of Kherson.

In October 2021, Kozyr was elected into parliament, winning 62.6% of the vote (21,365 votes) He left office on 26 October, being replaced by Hennadiy Lahuta. Lahuta had been a fellow candidate (for the party We Have to Live Here headed by Kolykhaiev) in the election but had in the election campaign withdraw his candidacy in favor of Kozyr.

He is a member of the Committee on Human Rights, Deoccupation and Reintegration of Temporarily Occupied Territories in Donetsk, Luhansk Oblasts and the Autonomous Republic of Crimea, the City of Sevastopol, National Minorities and International Relations.
