= Political history of the world =

The political history of the world is the history of the various political entities created by the human race throughout their existence and the way these states define their borders. Throughout history, political systems have expanded from basic systems of self-governance and monarchy to the complex democratic and totalitarian systems that exist today. In parallel, political entities have expanded from vaguely defined frontier-type boundaries, to the national definite boundaries existing today.

== Prehistoric era ==
The primate ancestors of human beings already had social and political skills. The first forms of human social organization were families living in band societies as hunter-gatherers.

After the invention of agriculture around (7,000–8,000 BCE) across various parts of the world, human societies started transitioning to tribal forms of organization. Food surpluses made possible the development of a social elite who were not engaged in agriculture, industry or commerce, but dominated their communities and monopolized decision-making. Nonetheless, larger societies made it more feasible for people to adopt diverse decision making and governance models.

There is evidence of diplomacy between different tribes, but also of endemic warfare. This could have been caused by theft of livestock or crops, abduction of women, or resource and status competition.

The three-age system of periodization of prehistory was first introduced for Scandinavia by Christian Jürgensen Thomsen in the 1830s. By the 1860s, it was embraced as a useful division of the "earliest history of mankind" in general and began to be applied in Assyriology. The now-conventional periodization in the archaeology of the Ancient Near East was developed in the 1920s to 1930s.

== Ancient history ==
The early distribution of political power was determined by the availability of fresh water, fertile soil, and temperate climate of different locations. These were all necessary for the development of highly organized societies. The locations of these early societies were near, or benefiting from, the edges of tectonic plates.

The Indus Valley Civilization was located next to the Himalayas (which were created by tectonic pressures) and the Indus and Ganges rivers, which deposit sediment from the mountains to produce fertile land. A similar dynamic existed in Mesopotamia, where the Tigris and Euphrates did the same with the Zagros Mountains. Ancient Egypt was helped by the Nile depositing sediments from the East African highlands of its origins, while the Yellow River and Yangtze acted in the same way for Ancient China. Eurasia was advantaged in the development of agriculture by the natural occurrence of domesticable wild grass species and the east–west orientation of the landmass, allowing for the easy spread of domesticated crops. A similar advantage was given to it by half of the world's large mammal species living there, which could be domesticated.

As the cooling and drying of the climate by 3800 BCE caused drought in Mesopotamia, village farmers began co-operating and started creating larger settlements with irrigation systems. This new water infrastructure in turn required centralised administration with complex social organisation. However, there is archaeological evidence that shows similar successes with more egalitarian and decentralized complex societies. The first cities and systems of greater social organisation emerged in Mesopotamia, followed within a few centuries by ones at the Indus and Yellow River Valleys. In the cities, the workforce could specialise as the whole population did not have to work for food production, while stored food allowed for large armies to create empires. The first empires were those of Ancient Egypt and Mesopotamia. Smaller kingdoms existed in North China Plain, Indo-Gangetic Plain, Central Asia, Anatolia, Eastern Mediterranean, and Central America, while the rest of humanity continued to live in small tribes.

=== Middle East and the Mediterranean ===
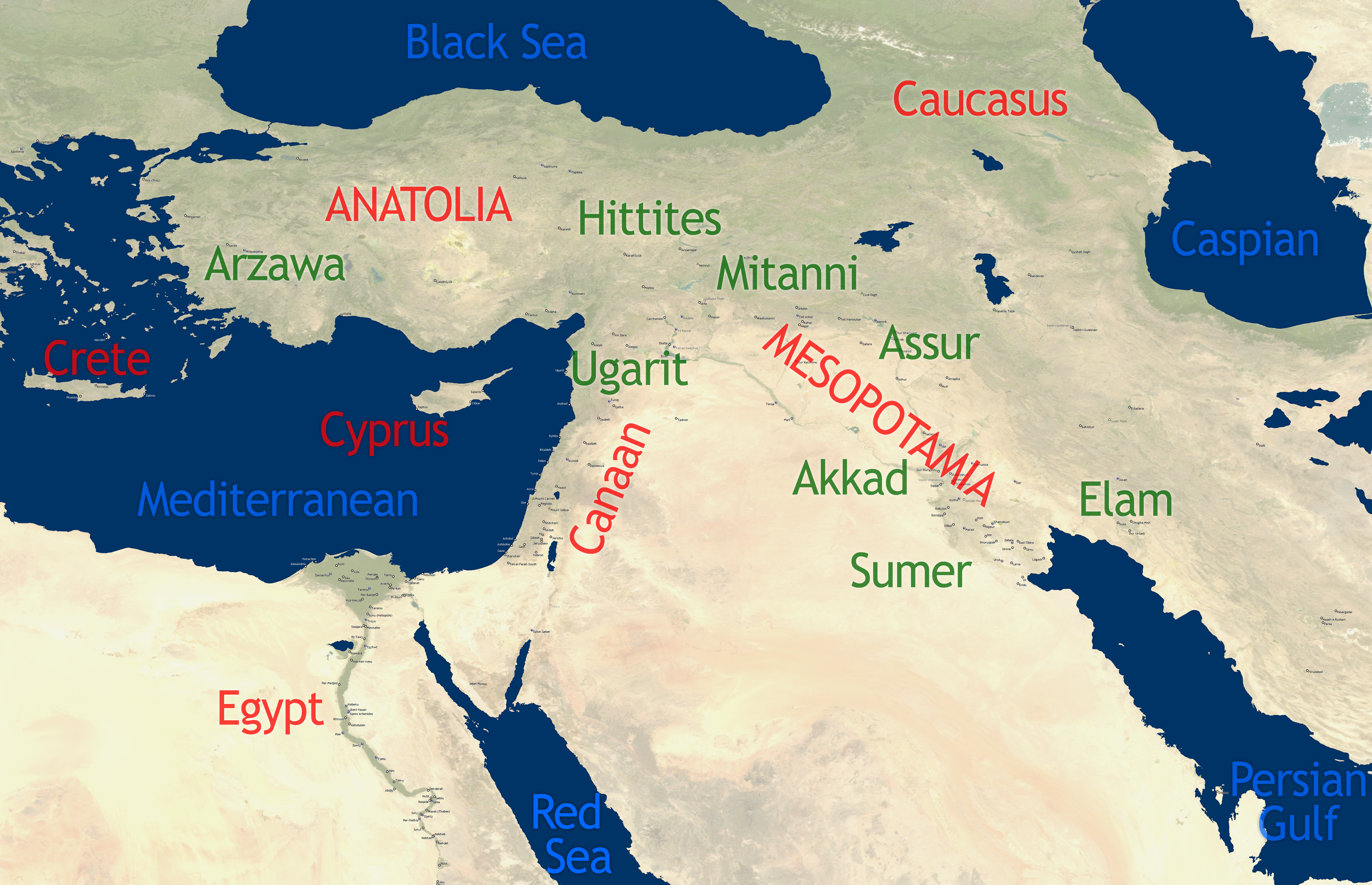
Overview map of the ancient Near East

The first states of sorts were those of early dynastic Sumer and early dynastic Egypt, which arose from the Uruk period and Predynastic Egypt respectively at approximately 3000BCE. Early dynastic Egypt was based around the Nile River in the north-east of Africa, the kingdom's boundaries being based around the Nile and stretching to areas where oases existed. Upper and Lower Egypt were unified around 3150 BCE by Pharaoh Menes. This process of consolidation was driven by the crowding of migrants from the expanding Sahara in the Nile Delta. Nevertheless, political competition continued within the country between centers of power such as Memphis and Thebes. The prevailing north-east trade winds made it easier to sail up the river, thereby helping the unification of the state. The geopolitical environment of the Egyptians had them surrounded by Nubia in the smaller southern oases of the Nile unreachable by boat, as well as by Libyan warlords operating from the oases around modern-day Benghazi, and finally by raiders across the Sinai and the sea. The country was well defended by natural barriers formed by the Sahara on both sides, though this also limited its ability to expand into a larger empire, mostly remaining a regional power along the Nile (except for a conquest of the Levant in the second millennium BCE). The lack of timber also made it too expensive to build a large navy for power projection across the Mediterranean or Red Seas.

==== Mesopotamian dominance ====
Mesopotamia is situated between the major rivers of Tigris and Euphrates, and the first political power in the region was the Akkadian Empire starting around 2300 BCE. They were preceded by Sumer, and later followed by Babylon, and Assyria. They faced competition from the mountainous areas to the north, strategically positioned above the Mesopotamian plains, with kingdoms such as Mitanni, Urartu, Elam, and Medes. The Mesopotamians also innovated in governance by writing the first laws.

A dry climate in the Iron Age caused turmoil as movements of people put pressure on the existing states resulting in the Late Bronze Age collapse, with Cimmerians, Arameans, Dorians, and the Sea Peoples migrating among others. Babylon never recovered following the death of Hammurabi in 1699 BCE. Following this, Assyria grew in power under Adad-nirari II. By the late ninth century BCE, the Assyrian Empire controlled almost all of Mesopotamia and much of the Levant and Anatolia. Meanwhile, Egypt was weakened, eventually breaking apart after the death of Osorkon II until 710 BCE. In 853, the Assyrians fought and won a battle against a coalition of Babylon, Egypt, Persia, Israel, Aram, and ten other nations, with over 60,000 troops taking part according to contemporary sources. However, the empire was weakened by internal struggles for power, and was plunged into a decade of turmoil beginning with a plague in 763 BCE. Following revolts by cities and lesser kingdoms against the empire, a coup d'état was staged in 745 by Tiglath-Pileser III. He raised the army from 44,000 to 72,000, followed by his successor Sennacherib who raised it to 208,000, and finally by Ashurbanipal who raised an army of over 300,000. This allowed the empire to spread over Cyprus, the entire Levant, Phrygia, Urartu, Cimmerians, Persia, Medes, Elam, and Babylon.

==== Persian dominance ====
By 650 BCE, Assyria had started declining as a severe drought hit the Middle East and an alliance was formed against them. Eventually they were replaced by the Median empire as the main power of the region following the Battle of Carchemish (605 BCE) and the Battle of the Eclipse (585 BCE). The Medians served as the launching pad for the rise of the Persian Empire. After first serving as vassals, under the third Persian king Cambyses I their influence rose, and in 553 BCE they rose against the Medians. By the death of Cyrus the Great, the Persian Achaemenid Empire reached from Aegean Sea to Indus River and Caucasus to Nubia. The empire was divided into provinces ruled by satraps, who collected taxes and were typically local power brokers. The empire controlled about a third of the world's farm land and a quarter of its population. In 522 BCE, after King Cambyses II's death, Darius the Great took over power.

==== Greek dominance ====
As the population of Ancient Greece grew, they began a colonization of the Mediterranean region. This encouraged trade, which in turn caused political changes in the city-states with old elites being overthrown in Corinth in 657 BCE and in Athens in 632, for example. There were many wars between the cities as well, including the Messenian Wars (743–742 BCE; 685–668 BCE), the Lelantine War (710–650 BCE), and the First Sacred War (595–585 BCE). In the seventh and sixth centuries, Corinth and Sparta were the dominant powers of Greece. The former was eventually supplanted by Athens as the main sea power, while Sparta remained the dominant land-force. In 499 BCE, in the Ionian Revolt Greek cities in Asia Minor rebelled against the Persian Empire but were crushed in the Battle of Lade. After this, the Persians invaded the Greek mainland in the Greco-Persian Wars (499–449 BCE).

The Macedonian King Philip II (350–336 BCE) conquered much of Greece. In 338 BCE, he formed the League of Corinth to liberate Greeks in Asia Minor from the Persians, with 10,000 troops invading in 336 BCE. After his murder, his son Alexander the Great took charge and crossed the Dardanelles in 334 BCE. After Asia Minor had been conquered, Alexander invaded Levant, Egypt, and Mesopotamia, defeating the Persians under Darius the Great in the Battle of Gaugamela in 331 BCE, and ending the last resistance by 328 BCE. After Alexander's death in Babylon in 323 BCE, the Macedonian Empire had no designated successor. This led to its division into four: the Antigonid dynasty in Macedonia, the Attalid dynasty in Anatolia, the Ptolemaic Kingdom in Egypt, and the Seleucid Empire over Mesopotamia.

==== Roman dominance ====
Territory of Rome

The Roman Republic became dominant in the Mediterranean Basin in the 3rd century BCE after defeating the Samnites, the Gauls and the Etruscans for control of the Italian Peninsula. In 264 BCE, it challenged its main rival Carthage to a fight for Sicily, starting the Punic Wars. A truce was signed in 241 BCE, with Rome gaining Corsica and Sardinia in addition to Sicily. In 218 BCE, the Carthaginian Army general Hannibal marched out of Iberia towards Italy, crossing the Alps with his war elephants. After 15 years of fighting, the Roman republican army beat him and then sent troops against Carthage itself, defeating it in 202 BCE. The Second Punic War alone cost Rome 100,000 casualties. In 146 BCE, Carthage was finally destroyed completely at the end of the Third Punic War.

Rome suffered from various internal disturbances and instabilities. In 133 BCE, Tiberius Gracchus was killed alongside hundreds of supporters after trying to redistribute public land to the poor under the Lex Sempronia Agraria. The Social War (91–88 BCE) was caused by neighbouring cities trying to secure themselves the benefits of Roman citizenship. In 82 BCE, general Sulla captured power violently, ending the Roman Republic and becoming a dictator. Following his death new power struggles emerged, and in Caesar's Civil War (49–46 BCE), Julius Caesar and Pompey fought over the empire, with the former winning. After the assassination of Julius Caesar in 44 BCE, a second civil war broke out between his potential heirs, Mark Antony and Augustus, the latter gaining the new title of Roman emperor. This then led to the Pax Romana, a long period of peace in the Roman Empire. The quarrels between the Ptolemaic Kingdom, the Seleucid Empire, the Parthian Empire and the Kingdom of Pontus in the Near East allowed the Romans to expand up to the Euphrates. During Augustus' reign the Rhine, Danube, and the Sahara became the other borders of the empire. The population reached about 60 million.

Political instability in Rome grew. Emperor Caligula (37–41 CE) was murdered by the Praetorian Guard to replace him with Claudius (41–53), while his successor Nero (54–68) was rumored to have burned Rome down. The average reign from his death to Philip the Arab (244–249) was six years. Nevertheless, external expansion continued, with Trajan (98–117) invading Dacia, Parthia and Arabia. Its only formidable enemy was the Parthian Empire. Migrating peoples started exerting pressure on the borders of the empire in the Migration Period. The drying climate of Central Asia forced the Huns to move, and in 370 they crossed Don and soon after the Danube, forcing the Goths on the move, which in turn caused other Germanic tribes to overrun Roman borders. In 293, Diocletian (284–305) appointed three rulers for different parts of the empire. It was formally divided in 395 by Theodosius I (379–395) into the Western Roman and Byzantine Empires. In 406 the northern border of the former was overrun by the Alemanni, Vandals and Suebi. In 408 the Visigoths invaded Italy and then sacked Rome in 410. The final collapse of the Western Empire came in 476 with the deposal of Romulus Augustulus (475–476).

=== Indian subcontinent ===
Built around the Indus River, by 3300 BCE the Indus Valley Civilization, located in modern-day India, Pakistan and Afghanistan, had formed. The civilization's boundaries extended to 600 km from the Arabian Sea. After its cities Mohenjo-daro and Harappa were abandoned around 1900 BCE, no political power is known to have replaced it.

States began to form in 12th century BCE with the formation of Kuru kingdom which was first state level administration in Indian subcontinent. In 6th century BCE with the emergence of Mahajanapadas. Out of sixteen such states, four strong ones emerged: Kosala, Magadha, Vatsa, and Avanti, with Magadha dominating the rest by the mid-fifth century. The Magadha then transformed into the Nanda Empire under Mahapadma Nanda (345–321 BCE), extending from the Gangetic plains to the Hindu Kush and the Deccan Plateau. The empire was, however, overtaken by Chandragupta Maurya (324–298 BCE), turning it into the Maurya Empire. He defended against Alexander's invasion from the West and received control of the Hindu Kush mountain passes in a peace treaty signed in 303 BCE. By the time of his grandson Ashoka's rule, the empire stretched from Zagros Mountains to the Brahmaputra River. The empire contained a population of 50 to 60 million, governed by a system of provinces ruled by governor-princes, with a capital in Pataliputra.

After Ashoka's death, the empire had begun to decline, with Kashmir in the north, Shunga and Satavahana in the centre, and Kalinga as well as Pandya in the south becoming independent. In to this power vacuum, the Yuezhi were able to establish the new Kushan Empire in 30 CE. The Gupta Empire was founded by Chandragupta I (320–335), which in sixty years expanded from the Ganges to the Bay of Bengal and the Indus River following the downfall of the Kushan Empire. Gupta governance was similar to that of the Maurya. Following wars with the Hephthalites and other problems, the empire fell by 550.

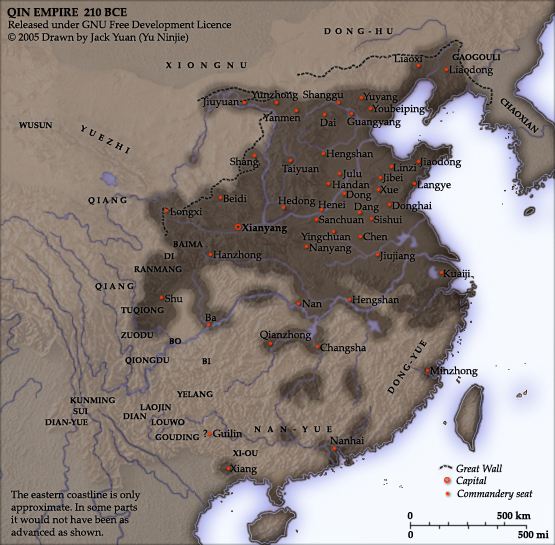
Qin dynasty

=== China ===
In the North China Plain, the Yellow River allowed the rise of states such as Wei and Qi. This area was first unified by the Shang dynasty around 1600 BCE, and replaced by the Zhou dynasty in the Battle of Muye in 1046 BCE, with reportedly millions taking part in the fighting. The victors were however hit by internal unrest soon after. The main rivals of the Zhou were the Dongyi in Shandong, the Xianyun in Ordos, the Guifang in Shanxi, as well as the Chu in the middle reaches of the Yangtze.

Beginning in the eighth century BCE China, fell into chaos for five centuries during the Spring and Autumn (771–476 BCE) and Warring States periods (476–221 BCE). During the latter period, the Jin dynasty split into the Wei, Zhao and Han states, while the rest of the North China Plain was composed of the Chu, Qin, Qi and Yan states, while the Zhou remained in the centre with largely ceremonial power. While the Zhao had an advantage at first, the Qin ended up defeating them in 260 BCE with about half a million soldiers fighting on each side at the Battle of Changping. The other states tried to form an alliance against the Qin but were defeated. In 221 BCE, the Qin dynasty was established with a population of about 40 million, with a capital of 350,000 in Linzi. Under the leadership of Qin Shi Huang, the dynasty initiated reforms such as establishing territorial administrative units, infrastructure projects (including the Great Wall of China) and uniform Chinese characters. However, after his death and burial with the Terracotta Army, the empire started falling apart when the Chu and Han started fighting over a power vacuum left by a weak heir, with the Han dynasty rising to power in 204 BCE.

Under the Han, the population of China rose to 50 million, with 400,000 in the capital Chang'an, and with territorial expansion to Korea, Vietnam and Tien Shan. Expeditions were also sent against the Xiongnu and to secure the Hexi Corridor, the Nanyue kingdom was annexed, and Hainan and Taiwan conquered. The Chinese pressure on the Xiongnu forced them towards the west, leading to the exodus of the Yuezhi, who in turn pillaged the capital of Bactria. This then led to their new Kushan Empire. The end of the Han dynasty in 220 CE came following internal upheavals, with its split into the Shu, Wu and Wei states. Following a brief unification under the Jin dynasty (266–420), China was divided again in 304 due to the rebellion of the Five Barbarians (304–316). Northern China and Sichuan were ruled by the Sixteen Kingdoms, while the Jin relocated south of the Yangtze River. By 439, the Xianbei-led Northern Wei unified the north while the Jin was usurped by the Liu Song, transitioning into the Northern and Southern dynasties period. China would be unified by the Sui dynasty in 589 CE.

=== Americas ===
The Olmecs were the first major Indigenous American culture, with some smaller ones such as the Chavín culture amongst mainly hunter-gatherers. The Olmecs were limited by the dense forests and the long rainy season of the Olmec heartland, as well as the lack of horses.

== Post-classical era ==
=== Africa ===
The coast of East Africa contained a string of trading cities connected to kingdoms in the interior. The Horn of Africa was dominated by the Ethiopian Empire by the 13th and 14th centuries. South from it were the Swahili cities of Mogadishu, Mombasa, Zanzibar, Kilwa, and Sofala. By the 14th century, Kilwa had conquered most of the others. It also engaged in campaigns against the inland power of Great Zimbabwe. Great Zimbabwe was itself overtaken in trade by its rival, the Kingdom of Mutapa. Towards the north, the Empire of Kitara dominated the African Great Lakes in the fourteenth and fifteenth centuries. Towards the Atlantic coast, the Kingdom of Kongo was of regional importance around the same time. The Gulf of Guinea had the Kingdom of Benin. To the north, in the Sahel, there was a tripartite competition between the Mossi Kingdoms, the Songhai Empire, as well as the Mali Empire, with the latter declining in the fifteenth century.

=== Americas ===
The Tiwanaku Polity in western Bolivia was based in the southern Lake Titicaca Basin. Its influence extended into present-day Peru and Chile and lasted from around 600 to 1000 AD. Chimor was the political grouping of the Chimú culture that ruled the northern coast of Peru beginning around 850 and ending around 1470. Chimor was the largest kingdom in the Late Intermediate period, encompassing 1,000 kilometres (620 mi) of coastline. The Aymara kingdoms in turn were a group of native polities that flourished towards the Late Intermediate Period, after the fall of the Tiwanaku Empire, whose societies were geographically located in the Qullaw. They were developed between 1150 and 1477, before the kingdoms disappeared due to the military conquest of the Inca Empire.

Beginning around 250 AD, the Maya civilization developed many city-states linked by a complex trade network. In the Maya Lowlands two great rivals, the cities of Tikal and Calakmul, became powerful. The period also saw the intrusive intervention of the central Mexican city of Teotihuacan in Maya dynastic politics. In the 9th century, there was a widespread political collapse in the central Maya region, resulting in internecine warfare, the abandonment of cities, and a northward shift of population. The Postclassic period saw the rise of Chichen Itza in the north, and the expansion of the aggressive Kʼicheʼ kingdom in the Guatemalan Highlands. In the 16th century, the Spanish Empire colonised the Mesoamerican region, and a lengthy series of campaigns saw the fall of Nojpetén, the last Maya city, in 1697.

The Aztec Empire was formed as an alliance of three Nahua altepetl city-states: Mexico-Tenochtitlan, Tetzcoco, and Tlacopan. from the victorious factions of a civil war fought between the city of Azcapotzalco and its former tributary provinces. These three city-states ruled the area in and around the Valley of Mexico from 1428 until the combined forces of the Spanish conquistadores and their native allies under Hernán Cortés defeated them in 1521. Despite the initial conception of the empire as an alliance of three self-governed city-states, Tenochtitlan quickly became dominant militarily. By the time the Spanish arrived in 1519, the lands of the Alliance were effectively ruled from Tenochtitlan, while the other partners in the alliance had taken subsidiary roles. The Tarascan state was the second-largest state in Mesoamerica at the time. It was founded in the early 14th century.

=== Asia ===
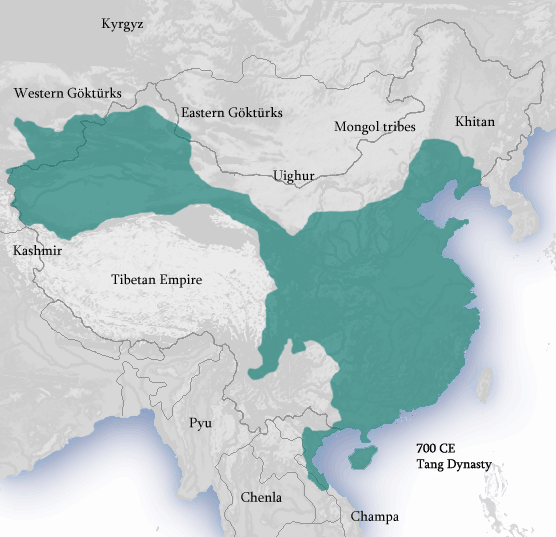
The Tang dynasty in 700 CE

When China entered the Sui dynasty, the government changed and expanded in its borders as the many separate bureaucracies unified under one banner. This evolved into the Tang dynasty when Li Yuan took control of China in 626. By now, the Chinese borders had expanded from eastern China, up north into the Tang Empire. The Tang Empire fell apart in 907 and split into ten regional kingdoms and five dynasties with vague borders. Fifty-three years after the separation of the Tang Empire, China entered the Song dynasty under the rule of Chao K'uang, although the borders of this country expanded, they were never as large as those of the Tang dynasty and were constantly being redefined due to attacks from the neighboring Tartar (Mongol) people known as the Khitan tribes.

The Mongol Empire emerged from the unification of several nomadic tribes in the Mongol homeland under the leadership of Genghis Khan (c. 1162–1227), whom a council proclaimed as the ruler of all Mongols in 1206. The empire grew rapidly under his rule and that of his descendants, who sent out invading armies in every direction. The vast transcontinental empire connected the East with the West, the Pacific to the Mediterranean, in an enforced Pax Mongolica, allowing the dissemination and exchange of trade, technologies, commodities and ideologies across Eurasia. The Mongol invasion halted China's economic development for over 150 years, decisively changing the balance of power in the Eastern Hemisphere.

The empire began to split due to wars over succession, as the grandchildren of Genghis Khan disputed whether the royal line should follow from his son and initial heir Ögedei or from one of his other sons, such as Tolui, Chagatai, or Jochi. The Toluids prevailed after a bloody purge of Ögedeid and Chagataid factions, but disputes continued among the descendants of Tolui. After Möngke Khan died (1259), rival kurultai councils simultaneously elected different successors, the brothers Ariq Böke and Kublai Khan, who fought each other in the Toluid Civil War (1260–1264) and also dealt with challenges from the descendants of other sons of Genghis. Kublai successfully took power, but civil war ensued as he sought unsuccessfully to regain control of the Chagatayid and Ögedeid families. By the time of Kublai's death in 1294 the Mongol Empire had fractured into four separate khanates or empires, each pursuing its own separate interests and objectives: the Golden Horde khanate in the northwest, the Chagatai Khanate in Central Asia, the Ilkhanate in the southwest, and the Yuan dynasty in the east, based in modern-day Beijing.

In 1304, the three western khanates briefly accepted the nominal suzerainty of the Yuan dynasty, but in 1368 the Han Chinese Ming dynasty took over the Mongol capital. The Genghisid rulers of the Yuan retreated to the Mongolian homeland and continued to rule there as the Northern Yuan dynasty. The Ming dynasty, the largest army in the world, with almost a million soldiers. It was therefore able to conduct military campaigns in Manchuria, Inner Mongolia, Yunnan, and Vietnam. Naval voyages were also sent, with the Ming treasure voyages reaching Africa. These also intervened militarily in Java, Sumatra, and Sri Lanka. The Ilkhanate disintegrated in 1335–1353. The Golden Horde had broken into competing khanates by the end of the 15th century and was defeated by the Russians in 1480, while the Chagatai Khanate lasted in one form or another until 1687.

=== Middle East and Europe ===
The Byzantine–Sasanian Wars of 572–591 and 602–628 produced the cumulative effects of a century of almost continuous conflict, leaving both empires crippled. When Kavadh II died only months after coming to the throne, the Sasanian Empire was plunged into several years of dynastic turmoil and civil war. The Sasanians were further weakened by economic decline, heavy taxation from Khosrau II's campaigns, religious unrest, and the increasing power of the provincial landholders. The Byzantine Empire was also severely affected, with its financial reserves exhausted by the war and the Balkans now largely in the hands of the Slavs. Additionally, Anatolia was devastated by repeated Persian invasions; the Empire's hold on its recently regained territories in the Caucasus, Syria, Mesopotamia, Palestine and Egypt was loosened by many years of Persian occupation. Neither empire was given any chance to recover, and according to George Liska, the "unnecessarily prolonged Byzantine–Persian conflict opened the way for Islam".

The Quraysh ruled the city of Mecca, and expelled their member Muhammad from it to the city of Medina in 622, from where he began spreading his new religion, Islam. In 631 Muhammad marched with 10,000 to Mecca and conquered it before dying the next year. His successors united most of Arabia in the Ridda wars (632–633) and then started the Muslim conquests of the Levant (634–641), Egypt (639–642) and Persia (633–651), the latter ending the Sasanian empire. In less than a decade after his death, the Islamic Rashidun Caliphate extended its reach from Atlas Mountains in the west to the Hindu Kush in the east. However, the First Fitna led to its replacement by the Umayyad Caliphate in 661, moving the centre of power to Damascus. At its height, the Umayaads ruled a third of the world's population. In 750, the Abbasid Caliphate replaced the Umayyads in the Abbasid Revolution. In 762, they moved the capital to Baghdad. The Emirate of Córdoba remained under Umayaad rule, while in 788 the Idrisid dynasty broke away in Morocco. The Fatimid Caliphate started taking over North Africa from 909 onwards, and the Buyid dynasty broke away in Persia and later Mesopotamia starting in the 930s. In 711, the Umayyad conquest of Hispania began, and in 717 they crossed the Pyrenees into the European Plain. They were met by the Merovingian dynasty, which had been established by Clovis I (481–511), which was in decline, leading Charles Martel to seize power and defeat the invasion force at the Battle of Tours in 732. His son Pepin the Short established the Carolingian dynasty in 751. Charlemagne (768–814) turned it into the Carolingian Empire, being crowned Emperor of the Romans in 800 by the Pope, with this forming the basis for the later Holy Roman Empire. Meanwhile, in Eastern Europe, Krum (795–814) expanded the Bulgarian Empire. The Treaty of Verdun divided Carolingian Empire into West, Middle and East Francia.

During the Viking Age (793–1066 AD), Norsemen known as Vikings undertook large-scale raiding, colonizing, conquest, and trading throughout Europe, and reached North America. Voyaging by sea from their homelands in Denmark, Norway and Sweden, the Norse people settled in the British Isles, Ireland, the Faroe Islands, Iceland, Greenland, Normandy, the Baltic coast, and along the Dnieper and Volga trade routes in eastern Europe, where they were also known as Varangians. They also briefly settled in Newfoundland, becoming the first Europeans to reach North America. The Vikings founded several kingdoms and earldoms in Europe: the kingdom of the Isles (Suðreyjar), Orkney (Norðreyjar), York (Jórvík) and the Danelaw (Danalǫg), Dublin (Dyflin), Normandy, and Kievan Rus' (Garðaríki). The Norse homelands were also unified into larger kingdoms during the Viking Age, and the short-lived North Sea Empire included large swathes of Scandinavia and Britain.

In 1095, Pope Urban II proclaimed the First Crusade at the Council of Clermont. He encouraged military support for Byzantine Emperor Alexios I against the Seljuk Turks and an armed pilgrimage to Jerusalem. Across all social strata in western Europe there was an enthusiastic popular response. Volunteers took a public vow to join the crusade. Historians now debate the combination of their motivations, which included the prospect of mass ascension into Heaven at Jerusalem, satisfying feudal obligations, opportunities for renown, and economic and political advantage. Initial successes established four Crusader states in the Near East: the County of Edessa; the Principality of Antioch; the Kingdom of Jerusalem; and the County of Tripoli. The crusader presence remained in the region in some form until the city of Acre fell in 1291, leading to the rapid loss of all remaining territory in the Levant. After this, there were no further crusades to recover the Holy Land.

Following the end of the Carolingian Empire, the largest polities in Western Europe were the Holy Roman Empire, the Byzantine Empire, Kingdom of France, and the Kingdom of England. The Catholic Church also wielded tremendous power. In Eastern Europe, the Mongol invasion of Europe killed half the population 1237 to 1241. The resulting power vacuum helped the Teutonic Order, while the Kingdom of Poland and the Kingdom of Hungary became the main Catholic realms. Further east, Kievan Rus' emerged from Novgorod and later became a federation of principalities; the region continued to prosper following the Mongol invasions. By the 15th century, Moscow threw off the "Tatar yoke" and laid the foundations for the Russian Empire. The main power to the south meanwhile was the Byzantine Empire. However, by 1180, the Republic of Venice had changed the balance of maritime power in the Mediterranean. In the Greater Middle East, power was divided between the Seljuk Empire, the Fatimid Caliphate, the Buyid dynasty, and the Ghaznavids. No Islamic power was able to hold Egypt, the Levant, Mesopotamia, and Persia at the same time again. In 1258, the Mongol Siege of Baghdad pushed the Islamic world into disarray.

The Seljuk dynasty was founded by Osman I (1200–1323), leading to the Ottoman Empire. In 1345, the Ottomans entered Europe across the Dardanelles, conquering Thessaloniki in 1387, and advancing to Kosovo by 1389. The Fall of Constantinople followed in 1453. The Fall of Constantinople marked the end of the Byzantine Empire, and effectively the end of the Roman Empire, a state which dated back to 27 BC and lasted nearly 1,500 years. The conquest of Constantinople and the fall of the Byzantine Empire was a key event of the Late Middle Ages and is considered the end of the Medieval period.

=== Indian subcontinent ===
Indian politics revolved around the struggle between the Buddhist Pala Empire, the Hindu Gurjara-Pratihara dynasty, the Jainist Rashtrakuta dynasty, as well as the Islamic caliphate. The Pala Empire had risen around 750 in Bengal under Gopala I, while the Rashtrakutas had emerged around the same time in the Deccan Plateau and the southern coast under Dantidurga. The Pratiharas first united the Indo-Gangetic Plain under Nagabhata I (c. 730–760), who has defeated an Islamic invasion of northern India. The struggle between the four lasted for almost 200 years. By the ninth century, the Ghaznavids, a breakaway from the caliphate, arose after taking advantage of the others' internal weaknesses.

The Chola dynasty arose as the one of Asia's strongest trading powers before invading Sri Lanka at the end of the 900's. In 1025, they attacked rival commercial kingdom of Srivijaya in Southeast Asia. Their enemies in India included an alliance of Pandyan princes and the Chalukya dynasty. However, the Ghurid dynasty invaded the northern parts of the subcontinent 1175 to 1186, conquering much of them. In 1206, Qutb al-Din Aibak founded the Delhi Sultanate. By the 14th century, it controlled the Indo-Gangetic Plain and the Deccan Plateau. In the middle of the century, the latter saw the rise of the Vijayanagara Empire, which ruled much of southern India as a federation. The Sultanate and the Empire engaged in continuous warfare without either being able to defeat the other.

== Early modern era ==
=== Americas ===
Beginning with the 1492 arrival of Christopher Columbus in the Caribbean and gaining control over more territory for over three centuries, the Spanish Empire would expand across the Caribbean Islands, half of South America, most of Central America and much of North America. The major empires of the American continents were defeated by much smaller Spanish forces. The Aztec Empire under Moctezuma II had 200,000 troops under its command, but was defeated by little over 600 conquistadors. The Inca Empire under Atahualpa with 60,000 soldiers was defeated by 168 Spaniards, meanwhile.

Following an earlier expedition to Yucatán led by Juan de Grijalva in 1518, Spanish conquistador Hernán Cortés led an expedition (entrada) to Mexico. Two years later, in 1519, Cortés and his retinue set sail for Mexico. Cortés made alliances with tributary city-states (altepetl) of the Aztec Empire as well as their political rivals, particularly the Tlaxcaltecs and Tetzcocans, a former partner in the Aztec Triple Alliance. Other city-states also joined, including Cempoala and Huejotzingo and polities bordering Lake Texcoco, the inland lake system of the Valley of Mexico. The Spanish campaign against the Aztec Empire had its final victory on 13 August 1521, when a coalition army of Spanish forces and native Tlaxcalan warriors led by Cortés and Xicotencatl the Younger captured the emperor Cuauhtémoc and Tenochtitlan, the capital of the Aztec Empire. The fall of Tenochtitlan marks the beginning of Spanish rule in central Mexico, and they established their capital of Mexico City on the ruins of Tenochtitlan.

After years of preliminary exploration and military skirmishes, 168 Spanish soldiers under conquistador Francisco Pizarro, his brothers, and their indigenous allies captured the Sapa Inca Atahualpa in the 1532 Battle of Cajamarca. It was the first step in a long campaign that took decades of fighting but ended in Spanish victory in 1572 and colonization of the region as the Viceroyalty of Peru.

The Spanish conquest of the Muisca took place from 1537 to 1540. Meanwhile, the Calchaquí Wars were a series of military conflicts between the Diaguita Confederation and the Spanish Empire in the 1560–1667 period. After many initial Spanish successes in the Arauco War against the Mapuche, the Battle of Curalaba in 1598 and the following destruction of the Seven Cities marked a turning point in the war leading to the establishment of a clear frontier between the Spanish domains and the land of the independent Mapuche.

=== Asia ===
==== Gunpowder empires ====
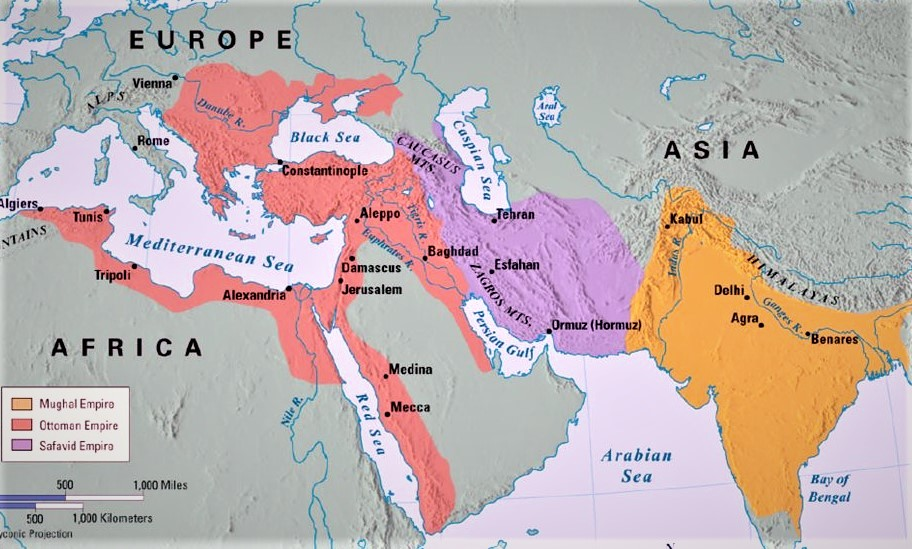
The gunpowder empires

The gunpowder empires were the Ottoman, Safavid, and Mughal empires as they flourished from the 16th century to the 18th century. These three empires were among the strongest and most stable economies of the early modern period, leading to commercial expansion, and greater patronage of culture, while their political and legal institutions were consolidated with an increasing degree of centralisation. The empires underwent a significant increase in per capita income and population, and a sustained pace of technological innovation. They stretched from Central Europe and North Africa in the west to between today's modern Bangladesh and Myanmar in the east.

Under Sultan Selim I (1512–1520), the Ottomans defeated the Safavids in the Battle of Chaldiran (1514). His successor, Suleiman the Magnificent (1520–1566), the Ottoman Empire marked the peak of its power and prosperity as well as the highest development of its government, social, and economic systems. Already controlling the Balkans, it was able to invade Hungary and win in the Battle of Mohács (1526). However, further advancement failed after the Siege of Vienna (1529). Following naval victories in the Battle of Preveza (1538) and the Battle of Djerba (1560), the Ottomans also emerged as the dominant maritime power in the Mediterranean. A sailing voyage even reached the Aceh Sultanate in 1565. At the beginning of the 17th century, the empire contained 32 provinces and numerous vassal states. Some of these were later absorbed into the Ottoman Empire, while others were granted various types of autonomy over the course of centuries. (Note: The empire also temporarily gained authority over distant overseas lands through declarations of allegiance to the Ottoman Sultan and Caliph, such as the declaration by the Sultan of Aceh in 1565, or through temporary acquisitions of islands such as Lanzarote in the Atlantic Ocean in 1585, Turkish Navy Official Website: "Atlantik'te Türk Denizciliği")

However, the Ottomans began to face many challenges. The failure to conquer the Safavid Empire forced it to keep forces in the east, while the expansion of the Russian Empire put pressure on the Black Sea territories. Meanwhile, Western powers began to overtake their maritime capabilities, with the Battle of Lepanto (1571) being a turning point. In 1683, the Battle of Vienna halted an Ottoman invasion again, with the Christian Holy League driving the Empire back into the Balkans. Despite the Venetian reconquest of Morea (Peloponnese) in the 1680s and it was recovered in 1715, while the island of Corfu under Venetian rule remained the only Greek island not conquered by the Ottomans. The Ottoman Empire still remained the largest power in the Mediterranean and the Middle East.

The Safavid dynasty ruled Persia from 1501 to 1722 (experiencing a brief restoration from 1729 to 1736). It ruled from the Black Sea to the Hindu Kush, with more than 50 million inhabitants. Originating from Caucasian warriors called the Qizilbash, they conquered Armenia in 1501, most of Persia by 1504, parts of Uzbekistan in 1511, and unsuccessfully fighting over Caucasus and Mesopotamia until 1555. However, Baghdad was recaptured in 1623. The expansion of Russia in the north eventually started to pose a threat. The Empire was finally defeated by and divided between the Ottomans and the Russians in 1722–23.

The Mughal Empire was an empire in South Asia. For some two centuries, the empire stretched from the outer fringes of the Indus basin in the west, northern Afghanistan in the northwest, and Kashmir in the north, to the highlands of present-day Assam and Bangladesh in the east, and the uplands of the Deccan Plateau in South India. In 1505, Central Asian invaders had entered the Indo-Gangetic Plain and established the Empire under Akbar (1556–1605). The neglect of northern defences allowed the Persians under Nader Shah to invade in 1739, with the capital Delhi sacked.

=== East Asia ===
Under the Ming dynasty (1368–1644), China's population and economy grew. While the Portuguese Empire was at first successfully kept out, Japanese pirates began to attack the coast, forcing co-operation with the Portuguese who established a trading settlement at Macau in 1554. Northern Mongol and Jurchen people established a coalition to invade the country, reaching Beijing in 1550. In 1592, the Japanese invaded Korea, while rebellions emerged in China.

=== Europe ===
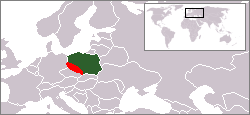
Silesia's position in Europe (in red)

In 1700, Charles II of Spain died, naming Phillip of Anjou, Louis XIV's grandson, his heir. Charles' decision was not well met by the British, who believed that Louis would use the opportunity to ally France and Spain and attempt to take over Europe. Britain formed the Grand Alliance with Holland, Austria and a majority of the German states and declared war against Spain in 1702. The War of the Spanish Succession lasted 11 years, and ended when the Treaty of Utrecht was signed in 1714.

Less than 50 years later, in 1740, war broke out again, sparked by the invasion of Silesia, part of Austria, by King Frederick the Great of Prussia. The British Empire, the Dutch Republic, and the Kingdom of Hungary supported Maria Theresa. Over the next eight years, these and other states participated in the War of the Austrian Succession, until a treaty was signed, allowing Prussia to keep Silesia. The Seven Years' War began when Theresa dissolved her alliance with Britain and allied with France and Russia. In 1763, Britain won the war, claiming Canada and land east of the Mississippi. Prussia also kept Silesia.

=== Oceania ===
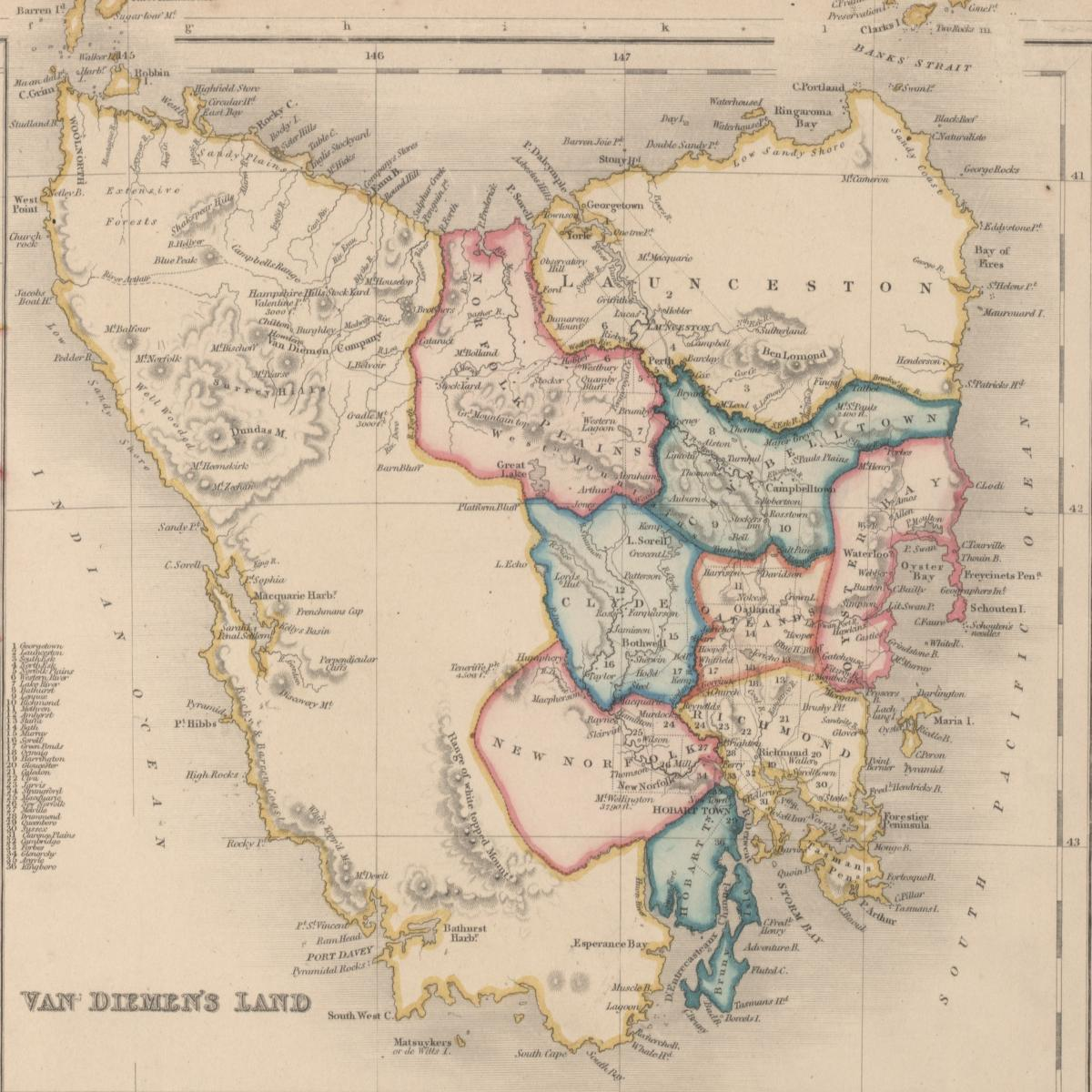
Van Diemen's Land in 1852

Interest in the geography of the Southern Hemisphere began to increase in the 18th century. In 1642, Dutch navigator Abel Tasman was commissioned to explore the Southern Hemisphere; during his voyages, Tasman discovered the island of Van Diemen's Land, which was later named Tasmania, the Australian coast, and New Zealand in 1644. Captain James Cook was commissioned in 1768 to observe a solar eclipse in Tahiti and sailed into Stingray Harbor on Australia's east coast in 1770, claiming the land for the British Crown. Settlements in Australia began in 1788 when Britain began to utilize the country for the deportation of convicts, with the first free settles arriving in 1793. Likewise New Zealand became a home for hunters seeking whales and seals in the 1790s with later non-commercial settlements by the Scottish in the 1820s and 1830s.

== Modern era ==
=== Revolutionary waves ===
The Atlantic Revolutions were a revolutionary wave in the late eighteenth and early nineteenth centuries. It took place in both the Americas and Europe. Following the Age of Enlightenment, ideas critical of absolutist monarchies began to spread, spreading liberalism. The first of these was the Corsican Revolution (1755–1769), which led to the first modern constitution and lead to female suffrage, inspired by the thought of Jean-Jacques Rousseau. In the American Revolution (1765–1783), American colonies of the British Empire rose against taxation without representation and declared that all men are created equal. Other revolutions included the Geneva Revolution of 1782, Revolt of Dutch Patriots (1785), Liège Revolution (1789–1795), Brabant Revolution (1790), Haitian Revolution (1791–1804), Batavian Revolution (1795), Slave revolt in Curaçao (1795), Fédon's rebellion (1796), Scottish Rebellion (1797), Irish Rebellion (1798), Helvetic Revolution (1798), and Altamuran Revolution (1799), 1811 German Coast uprising (1811), and the Norwegian War of Independence (1814). There were smaller upheavals in Switzerland, Russia, and Brazil. The revolutionaries in each country knew of the others and to some degree were inspired by or emulated them.

The French Revolutionary Wars were a series of sweeping military conflicts lasting from 1792 until 1802 and resulting from the French Revolution. They pitted France against Great Britain, the Holy Roman Empire, Prussia, Russia, and several other monarchies. They are divided in two periods: the War of the First Coalition (1792–1797) and the War of the Second Coalition (1798–1802). Initially confined to Europe, the fighting gradually assumed a global dimension. After a decade of constant warfare and aggressive diplomacy, France had conquered territories in the Italian Peninsula, the Low Countries and the Rhineland in Europe and was retroceded Louisiana in North America. French success in these conflicts ensured the spread of revolutionary principles over much of Europe.

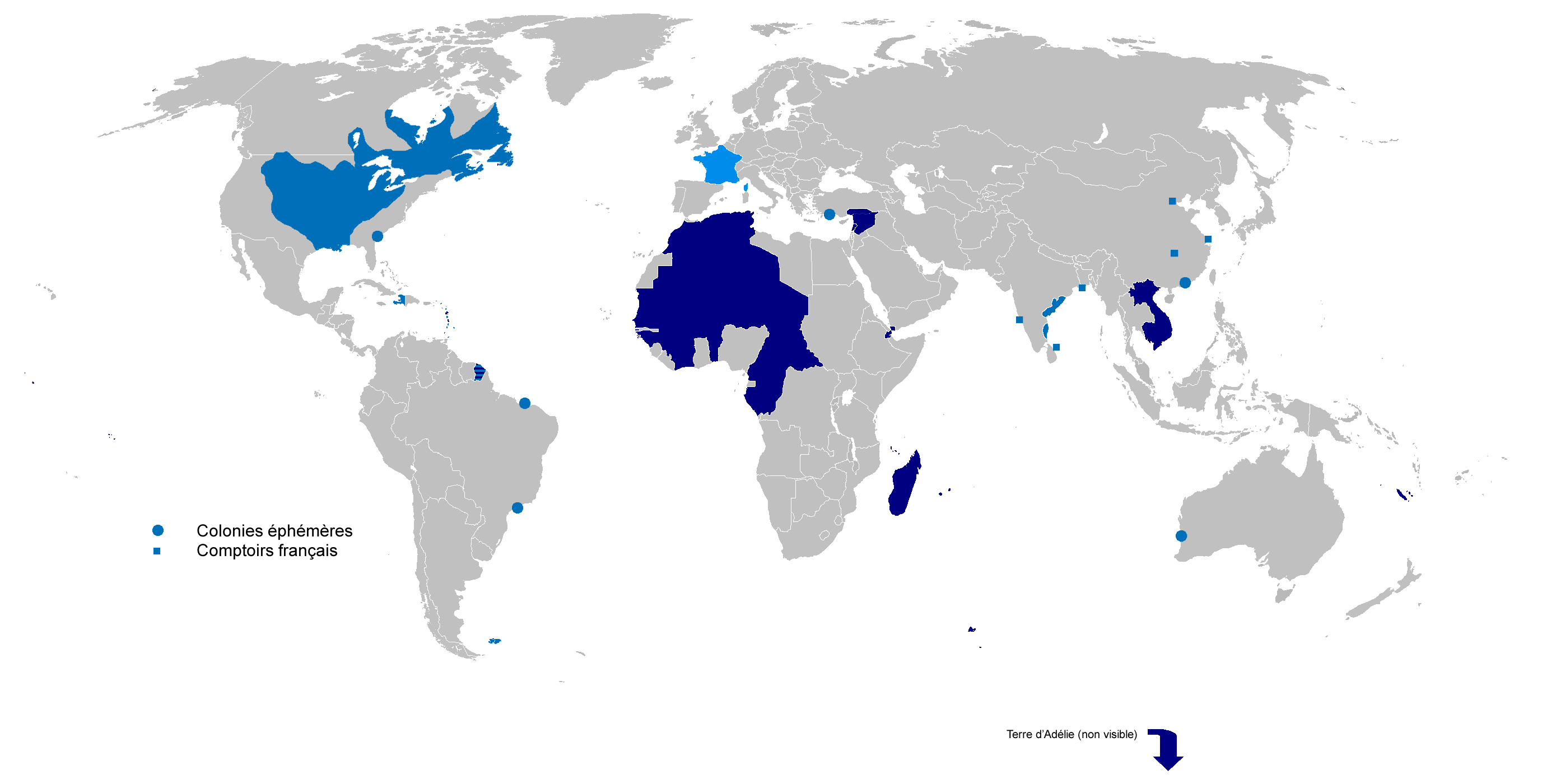
The French colonial empire was the second largest empire in the world behind the British Empire.

The Coup of 18 Brumaire brought General Napoleon Bonaparte to power as First Consul of France and in the view of most historians ended the French Revolution. The Napoleonic Wars (1803–1815) were a series of major conflicts pitting the French Empire and its allies, led by Napoleon I, against a fluctuating array of European powers formed into various coalitions. It produced a brief period of French domination over most of continental Europe. The wars stemmed from the unresolved disputes associated with the French Revolution and its resultant conflict. The wars are often categorised into five conflicts, each termed after the coalition that fought Napoleon: the Third Coalition (1805), the Fourth (1806–07), the Fifth (1809), the Sixth (1813–14), and the Seventh (1815).

The Peninsular War with France, which resulted from the Napoleonic occupation of Spain, caused Spanish Creoles in Spanish America to question their allegiance to Spain, stoking independence movements that culminated in various Spanish American wars of independence (1808–1833), which were primarily fought between opposing groups of colonists and only secondarily against Spanish forces. At the same time, the Portuguese monarchy relocated to Brazil during Portugal's French occupation. After the royal court returned to Lisbon, the prince regent, Pedro, remained in Brazil and in 1822 successfully declared himself emperor of a newly independent Brazilian Empire.

Revolutions during the 1820s included the Carbonari in Italy, the Trienio Liberal in Spain, the Liberal Revolution of 1820 in the Kingdom of Portugal, the Greek War of Independence, and the Decembrist revolt in the Russian Empire. Followed by these, the Revolutions of 1830 were an included the Belgian Revolution in the United Kingdom of the Netherlands, the July Revolution in France, the November Uprising in the Congress Poland, and the Ustertag in Switzerland. The Revolutions of 1848 in turn were the most widespread revolutionary wave in European history. They included the March Revolution, French Revolution, German revolutions, the Revolutions in the Italian states, Greater Poland uprising, March Unrest, Revolutions in the Austrian Empire, Praieira revolt, Revolution in Luxembourg, Moldavian Revolution, Wallachian Revolution, Chartism, and the Young Ireland rebellion.

=== Great power competition ===
Inspired by the rebellions in the 1820s and 1830s against the outcome of the Congress of Vienna, the Italian unification process was precipitated by the revolutions of 1848. It reached completion in 1871, when the Papal States were captured and Rome was officially designated the capital of the Kingdom of Italy. After the Franco-Prussian War of 1870–71, Prussia, under Otto von Bismarck, brought together almost all the German states (excluding the Austrian Empire, Luxembourg, and Liechtenstein) into a new German Empire. Bismarck's new empire became the most powerful state in Continental Europe until 1914. Meanwhile, Britain had entered an era of "splendid isolation", avoiding entanglements that had led it into the Crimean War in 1854–1856. It concentrated on internal industrial development and political reform, and building up its great international holdings, the British Empire, while maintaining by far the world's strongest Navy to protect its island home and its many overseas possessions.

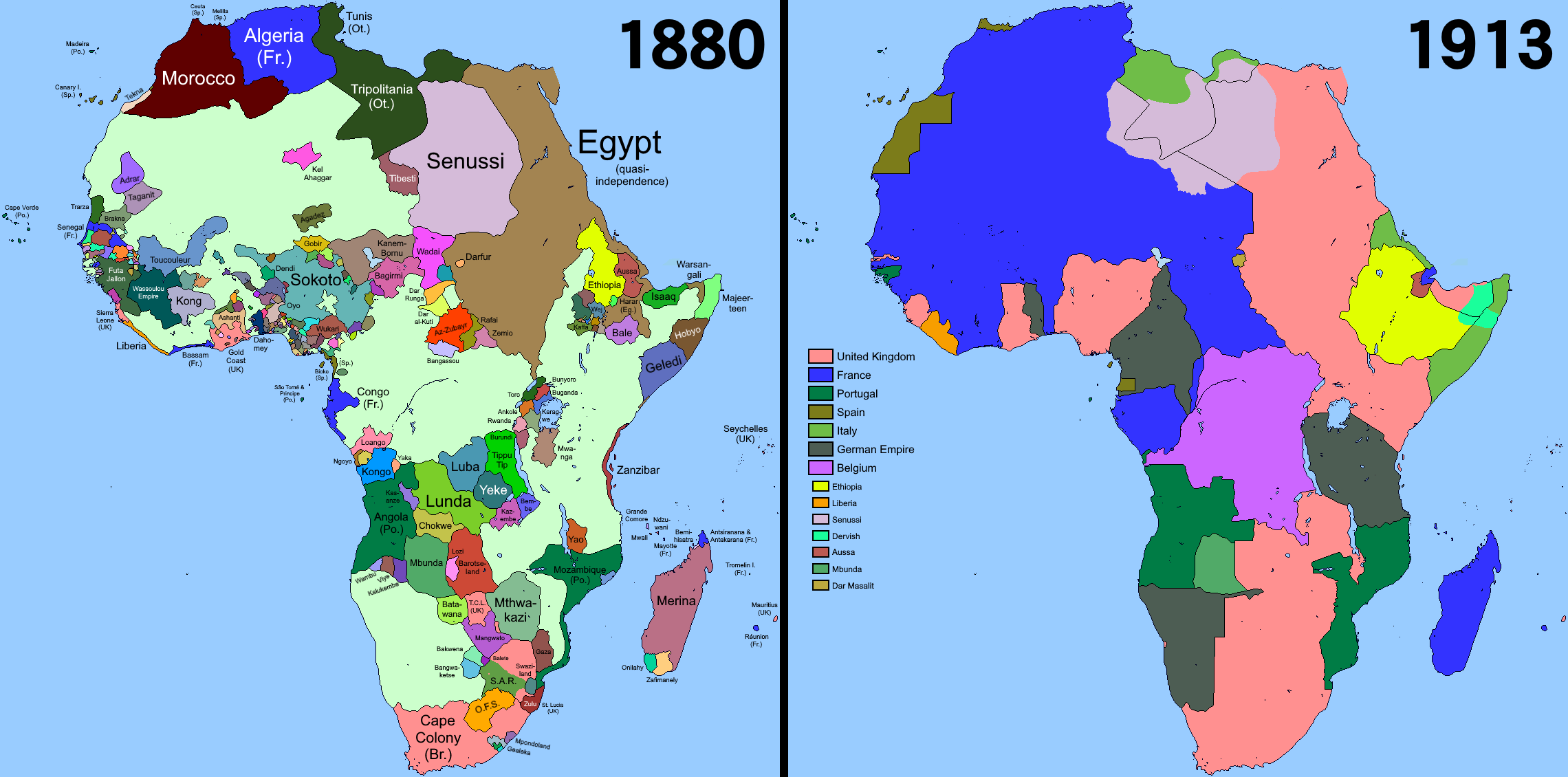
Comparison of Africa in the years 1880 and 1913

The Berlin Conference of 1884, which regulated European colonization and trade in Africa, is usually accepted as the beginning of the Scramble for Africa. In the last quarter of the 19th century, there were considerable political rivalries among the empires of the European continent, leading to the African continent being partitioned without wars between European nations. As late as the 1870s, Europeans controlled approximately 10% of the African continent, with all their territories located near the coasts. The most important holdings were Angola and Mozambique, held by Portugal; the Cape Colony, held by Great Britain; and Algeria, held by France. By 1914, only Ethiopia and Liberia remained independent of European control, with the latter having strong connections to the United States.

In the Spanish–American War of 1898, the United States intervened in the Cuban War of Independence, leading it to emerge as the predominant power in the Caribbean region, and resulting in U.S. acquisition of Spain's Pacific possessions. It also led to United States involvement in the Philippine Revolution and later to the Philippine–American War. The Banana Wars were a series of conflicts that consisted of military occupation, police action, and intervention by the United States in Central America and the Caribbean following the end of the Spanish–American War in 1898, after which the United States proceeded to conduct military interventions in Cuba, Panama, Nicaragua, Mexico, Haiti, and the Dominican Republic.

=== World wars ===
==== World War I and aftermath ====
World War I saw the continent of Europe split into two major opposing alliances; the Allied Powers, primarily composed of the United Kingdom of Great Britain and Ireland, the United States, France, the Russian Empire, Italy, Japan, Portugal, and the many aforementioned Balkan States such as the Kingdom of Serbia and Montenegro; and the Central Powers, primarily composed of the German Empire, the Austro-Hungarian Empire, the Ottoman Empire and Bulgaria. Though Serbia was defeated in the Serbian Campaign of 1915, and Romania joined the Allied Powers in 1916, only to be defeated in 1917, none of the great powers were knocked out of the war until 1918. The 1917 February Revolution in Russia replaced the Russian Empire with the Provisional Government, but continuing discontent with the cost of the war led to the October Revolution, the creation of the Soviet Socialist Republic, and the signing of the Treaty of Brest-Litovsk by the new government in March 1918, ending Russia's involvement in the war. One by one, the Central Powers quit: first Bulgaria (September 29), then the Ottoman Empire (October 31) and the Austro-Hungarian Empire (November 3). With its allies defeated, revolution at home, and the military no longer willing to fight, Kaiser Wilhelm abdicated on 9 November and Germany signed an armistice on 11 November 1918, ending the war.

The partitioning of the Ottoman Empire after the war led to the domination of the Middle East by Western powers such as Britain and France, and saw the creation of the modern Arab world and the Republic of Turkey. The League of Nations mandate granted the French Mandate for Syria and the Lebanon, the British Mandate for Mesopotamia (later Iraq) and the British Mandate for Palestine, later divided into Mandatory Palestine and the Emirate of Transjordan (1921–1946). The Ottoman Empire's possessions in the Arabian Peninsula became the Kingdom of Hejaz, which the Sultanate of Nejd (today Saudi Arabia) was allowed to annex, and the Mutawakkilite Kingdom of Yemen. The Empire's possessions on the western shores of the Persian Gulf were variously annexed by Saudi Arabia (al-Ahsa and Qatif), or remained British protectorates (Kuwait, Bahrain, and Qatar) and became the Arab States of the Persian Gulf.

The Revolutions of 1917–1923 included political unrest and revolts around the world inspired by the success of the Russian Revolution and the disorder created by the aftermath of World War I. In war-torn Imperial Russia, the liberal February Revolution toppled the monarchy. A period of instability followed, and the Bolsheviks seized power during the October Revolution. In response to the emerging Soviet Union, anticommunist forces from a broad assortment of ideological factions fought against the Bolsheviks, particularly by the counter-revolutionary White movement and the peasant Green armies, the various nationalist movements in Ukraine after the Russian Revolution and other would-be new states like those in Soviet Transcaucasia and Soviet Central Asia, the anarchist-inspired Third Russian Revolution and the Tambov Rebellion. The Leninist victories also inspired a surge by world communism: the larger German Revolution and its offspring, like the Bavarian Soviet Republic, the neighbouring Hungarian Revolution, and the Biennio Rosso in Italy, in addition to various smaller uprisings, protests and strikes, all of which proved abortive. The Bolsheviks sought to coordinate this new wave of revolution in the Soviet-led Comintern.

==== The rise of fascism ====
The conditions of economic hardship caused by the Great Depression brought about an international surge of social unrest. In Germany, it contributed to the rise of the Nazi Party, which resulted in the demise of the Weimar Republic and the establishment of the fascist regime, Nazi Germany, under the leadership of Adolf Hitler. Fascist movements grew in strength elsewhere in Europe. Hungarian fascist Gyula Gömbös rose to power as Prime Minister of Hungary in 1932 and attempted to entrench his Party of National Unity throughout the country. The fascist Iron Guard movement in Romania soared in political support after 1933, gaining representation in the Romanian government, and an Iron Guard member assassinated Romanian prime minister Ion Duca. During the 6 February 1934 crisis, France faced the greatest domestic political turmoil since the Dreyfus Affair when the fascist Francist Movement and multiple far-right movements rioted en masse in Paris against the French government resulting in major political violence.

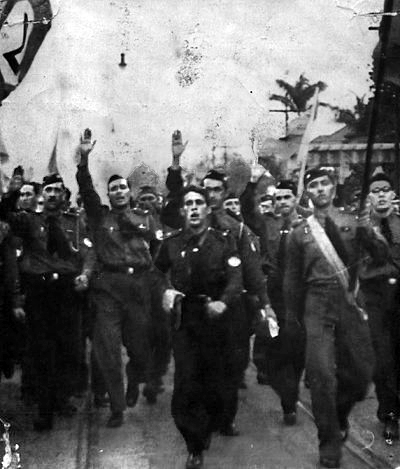
Integralists marching in Brazil

In the Americas, the Brazilian Integralists led by Plínio Salgado claimed as many as 200,000 members although following coup attempts it faced a crackdown from the Estado Novo of Getúlio Vargas in 1937. In the 1930s, the National Socialist Movement of Chile gained seats in Chile's parliament and attempted a coup d'état that resulted in the Seguro Obrero massacre of 1938.

==== World War II ====
World War II is generally considered to have begun on 1 September 1939, when Nazi Germany, under Adolf Hitler, invaded Poland. The United Kingdom and France subsequently declared war on Germany on the 3rd. Under the Molotov–Ribbentrop Pact of August 1939, Germany and the Soviet Union had partitioned Poland and marked out their "spheres of influence" across Finland, Romania and the Baltic states. From late 1939 to early 1941, in a series of campaigns and treaties, Germany conquered or controlled much of continental Europe, and formed the Axis alliance with Italy and Japan (along with other countries later on). Following the onset of campaigns in North Africa and East Africa, and the fall of France in mid-1940, the war continued primarily between the European Axis powers and the British Empire, with war in the Balkans, the aerial Battle of Britain, the Blitz of the UK, and the Battle of the Atlantic. On 22 June 1941, Germany led the European Axis powers in an invasion of the Soviet Union, opening the Eastern Front, the largest land theatre of war in history and trapping the Axis powers, crucially the German Wehrmacht, in a war of attrition.

Japan, which aimed to dominate Asia and the Pacific, was at war with the Republic of China by 1937. In December 1941, Japan attacked American and British territories with near-simultaneous offensives against Southeast Asia and the Central Pacific, including an attack on the US fleet at Pearl Harbor which forced the US to declare war against Japan; the European Axis powers declared war on the US in solidarity. Japan soon captured much of the western Pacific, but its advances were halted in 1942 after losing the critical Battle of Midway; later, Germany and Italy were defeated in North Africa and at the Battle of Stalingrad in the Soviet Union. Key setbacks in 1943—including a series of German defeats on the Eastern Front, the Allied invasions of Sicily and the Italian mainland, and Allied offensives in the Pacific—cost the Axis powers their initiative and forced it into strategic retreat on all fronts. In 1944, the Western Allies invaded German-occupied France, while the Soviet Union regained its territorial losses and turned towards Germany and its allies. During 1944 and 1945, Japan suffered reversals in mainland Asia, while the Allies crippled the Japanese Navy and captured key western Pacific islands.

The war in Europe concluded with the liberation of German-occupied territories, and the invasion of Germany by the Western Allies and the Soviet Union, culminating in the fall of Berlin to Soviet troops, Hitler's suicide and the German unconditional surrender on 8 May 1945. Following the Potsdam Declaration by the Allies on 26 July 1945 and the refusal of Japan to surrender on its terms, the United States dropped the first atomic bombs on the Japanese cities of Hiroshima, on 6 August, and Nagasaki, on 9 August. Faced with an imminent invasion of the Japanese archipelago, the possibility of additional atomic bombings, and the Soviet entry into the war against Japan and its invasion of Manchuria, Japan announced its intention to surrender on 15 August, then signed the surrender document on 2 September 1945, cementing total victory in Asia for the Allies.

World War II changed the political alignment and social structure of the globe. The United Nations (UN) was established to foster international co-operation and prevent future conflicts, and the victorious great powers—China, France, the Soviet Union, the United Kingdom, and the United States—became the permanent members of its Security Council. The Soviet Union and the United States emerged as rival superpowers, setting the stage for the nearly half-century-long Cold War. In the wake of European devastation, the influence of its great powers waned, triggering the decolonisation of Africa and Asia. Most countries whose industries had been damaged moved towards economic recovery and expansion. Political integration, especially in Europe, began as an effort to forestall future hostilities, end pre-war enmities and forge a sense of common identity.

=== Cold War ===
The Cold War was a period of geopolitical tension between the United States and the Soviet Union and their respective allies, the Western Bloc and the Eastern Bloc, which began following World War II. The Western Bloc was led by the United States as well as the other First World nations of the Western Bloc that were generally liberal democratic but tied to a network of the authoritarian states, most of which were their former colonies. (Note: "Where did banana republics get their name?" The Economist, 21 November 2013) The Eastern Bloc was led by the Soviet Union and its Communist Party, which had an influence across the Second World. The US government supported right-wing governments and uprisings across the world, while the Soviet government funded communist parties and revolutions around the world. As nearly all the colonial states achieved independence in the period 1945–1960, they became Third World battlefields in the Cold War.

==== Early Cold War and decolonization ====
The first phase of the Cold War began shortly after the end of the Second World War in 1945. The United States and its allies created the NATO military alliance in 1949 in the apprehension of a Soviet attack and termed their global policy against Soviet influence containment. The Soviet Union formed the Warsaw Pact in 1955 in response to NATO. Major crises of this phase included the 1948–49 Berlin Blockade, the 1927–1949 Chinese Civil War, the 1950–1953 Korean War, the 1956 Hungarian Revolution, the 1956 Suez Crisis, the Berlin Crisis of 1961 and the 1962 Cuban Missile Crisis. The US and the USSR competed for influence in Latin America, the Middle East, and the decolonizing states of Africa and Asia.

==== Détente and the Third World ====
Following the Cuban Missile Crisis, a new phase began that saw the Sino-Soviet split between China and the Soviet Union complicate relations within the Communist sphere, while France, a Western Bloc state, began to demand greater autonomy of action. The USSR invaded Czechoslovakia to suppress the 1968 Prague Spring, while the US experienced internal turmoil from the civil rights movement and opposition to the Vietnam War. In the 1960s–70s, an international peace movement took root among citizens around the world. Movements against nuclear arms testing and for nuclear disarmament took place, with large anti-war protests. By the 1970s, both sides had started making allowances for peace and security, ushering in a period of détente that saw the Strategic Arms Limitation Talks and the US opening relations with the People's Republic of China as a strategic counterweight to the USSR. A number of self-proclaimed Marxist regimes were formed in the second half of the 1970s in the Third World, including Angola, Mozambique, Ethiopia, Cambodia, Afghanistan and Nicaragua.

==== End of the Cold War ====
Détente collapsed at the end of the decade with the beginning of the Soviet–Afghan War in 1979. The early 1980s was another period of elevated tension. The United States increased diplomatic, military, and economic pressures on the Soviet Union, at a time when it was already suffering from economic stagnation. In the mid-1980s, the new Soviet leader Mikhail Gorbachev introduced the liberalizing reforms of glasnost ("openness", c. 1985) and perestroika ("reorganization", 1987) and ended Soviet involvement in Afghanistan. Pressures for national sovereignty grew stronger in Eastern Europe, and Gorbachev refused to militarily support their governments any longer.

In 1989, the fall of the Iron Curtain after the Pan-European Picnic and a peaceful wave of revolutions (with the exception of Romania and Afghanistan) overthrew almost all communist governments of the Eastern Bloc. The Communist Party of the Soviet Union itself lost control in the Soviet Union and was banned following an abortive coup attempt in August 1991. This in turn led to the formal dissolution of the USSR in December 1991, the declaration of independence of its constituent republics and the collapse of communist governments across much of Africa and Asia. The United States was left as the world's only superpower.

=== Post-Cold War era ===
==== 1990s ====
Following the collapse of the Soviet Union, many post-Soviet conflicts took place across its former territory. Secessionist movements fought against their new host governments in the First Nagorno-Karabakh War (1988–1994), Transnistria War(1990–1992), South Ossetia War (1991–1992), War in Abkhazia (1992–1993), and in the First Chechen War (1994–1996). Civil conflicts over power within the new states were fought in Georgia (1991–1993), in Tajikistan (1992–1997), and in Russia in 1993. Czechoslovakia broke apart peacefully in 1993, while the breakup of Yugoslavia starting in 1990 led to the bitter inter-ethnic Yugoslav Wars of the rest of the decade.

Following the end of the global competition between real socialism and market democracies, many Third Way politicians emerged. In the United States, a leading proponent of this was 42nd President Bill Clinton, who was in office from 1993 to 2001. In the United Kingdom, Third Way social-democratic proponent Tony Blair claimed that the socialism he advocated was different from traditional conceptions of socialism and said: "My kind of socialism is a set of values based around notions of social justice. [...] Socialism as a rigid form of economic determinism has ended, and rightly".

Following German reunification, European integration continued, led by Chancellor of Germany Helmut Kohl and President of France François Mitterrand. On 1 November 1993, the Maastricht Treaty became effective, creating the European Union with its pillar system, formalising European Political Cooperation as the Common Foreign and Security Policy and adding the new area of Justice and Home Affairs. On 1 January 1994 the European Economic Area (EEA) entered into force, allowing European Free Trade Association (EFTA) members Norway and Iceland to enter the Single European Market (created the previous year) without joining the Union. The Schengen Agreement later came into effect on 26 March 1995.

Between 7 April and 15 July 1994, during the Rwandan Civil War, the Rwandan genocide occurred. During this period of around 100 days, members of the Tutsi minority ethnic group, as well as some moderate Hutu and Twa, were killed by armed militias. The most widely accepted scholarly estimates are around 500,000 to 662,000 Tutsi deaths. The genocide had lasting and profound effects. In 1996, the RPF-led Rwandan government launched an offensive into Zaire (now the Democratic Republic of the Congo), home to exiled leaders of the former Rwandan government and many Hutu refugees, starting the First Congo War and killing an estimated 200,000 people. The subsequent Second Congo War began in August 1998, little more than a year after the First Congo War, and involved some of the same issues, with nine African countries and around twenty-five armed groups involved in the war.

Under Jiang Zemin's leadership, China experienced substantial economic growth with the continuation of the reform and opening up, saw the return of Hong Kong from the United Kingdom in 1997 and Macau from Portugal in 1999 and improved its relations with the outside world, while the Communist Party maintained its tight control over the state. However, during the Third Taiwan Strait Crisis a series of missile tests conducted by the People's Republic of China in the waters surrounding Taiwan from 21 July 1995 to 23 March 1996, leading the U.S. government responding by staging the biggest display of American military might in Asia since the Vietnam War, while on May 7, 1999, during the NATO bombing of Yugoslavia, U.S. guided bombs hit the People's Republic of China embassy in the Belgrade district of New Belgrade, killing three Chinese journalists and outraging the Chinese public.

Atal Bihari Vajpayee, one of the co-founders of the Bharatiya Janata Party and a member of the Rashtriya Swayamsevak Sangh Hindu nationalist organisation, became the first Indian prime minister not of the Indian National Congress to serve a full term in office. During his tenure, on 28 May 1998, a few weeks after India's second nuclear test (Operation Shakti), Pakistan detonated five nuclear devices during operation Chagai-I, becoming the seventh country in the world to successfully develop and test nuclear weapons. The Kargil War was an armed conflict fought between India and Pakistan from May to July 1999 in the Kargil district of Jammu and Kashmir and elsewhere along the Line of Control (LoC). The 1999 Pakistani coup d'état was a bloodless coup initiated by General Pervez Musharraf, who overthrew the publicly elected Prime Minister Nawaz Sharif on 12 October 1999.

==== 2000s ====
Following the September 11 attacks in 2001 by Al-Qaeda, the American-led intervention in Afghanistan led to the fall of the Taliban government in Afghanistan after the country had harboured the terrorists behind it. However, the US occupation of the country failed to quell the subsequent Taliban insurgency. During the Iraqi conflict, the 2003 invasion of Iraq by a United States-led coalition toppled the government of Saddam Hussein, but the conflict continued as an insurgency emerged to oppose the occupying forces and the post-invasion Iraqi government. The United States also conducted a series of military strikes on al-Qaeda militants in Yemen since the War on Terror began. The insurgency in Khyber Pakhtunkhwa began in 2004 when tensions rooted in the Pakistan Army's search for al-Qaeda fighters in the Waziristan area escalated into armed resistance, with Pakistan's actions presented as its contribution to the War on Terror.

Russia also engaged on its own, largely internally focused, counter-terrorism campaign during the Second Chechen War and the Insurgency in the North Caucasus. Rising to leadership during this time, Vladimir Putin's first tenure as president saw the Russian economy grew on average by seven percent per year, while Russia also experienced democratic backsliding and a shift to authoritarianism, characterised by endemic corruption,. Putin became during this time the second-longest serving contemporary European president after his close ally Alexander Lukashenko of Belarus. In other post-communist states, colour revolutions against the local elites took place, including the Federal Republic of Yugoslavia's Bulldozer Revolution (2000), Georgia's Rose Revolution (2003), Ukraine's Orange Revolution (2004), and Kyrgyzstan's Tulip Revolution (2005). The Russo-Georgian War place in August 2008 following a period of worsening relations between the two countries.

In the 2000s, there was an active movement towards further consolidation of the European Union, with the introduction of symbols and institutions usually reserved for sovereign states, such as citizenship, a common currency (used by 19 out of 27 members), a flag, an anthem and a motto (In Varietate Concordia, "United in Diversity"). An attempt to introduce a European Constitution was made in 2004, but it failed to be ratified; instead, the Treaty of Lisbon was signed in 2007 in order to salvage some of the reforms that had been envisaged in the constitution. The largest expansion of the European Union (EU), in terms of territory, number of states, and population took place on 1 May 2004 with the simultaneous accessions of Cyprus, the Czech Republic, Estonia, Hungary, Latvia, Lithuania, Malta, Poland, Slovakia, and Slovenia. Seven of these were part of the former Eastern Bloc. Part of the same wave of enlargement was also the accession of Bulgaria and Romania in 2007.

Hu Jintao was the paramount leader of China from 2004 to 2012. and the first leader of the Communist Party from a generation younger than the founders of the republic. Along with his colleague Premier Wen Jiabao, he presided over nearly a decade of consistent economic growth and development that cemented China as a major world power. Hu sought to improve socio-economic equality domestically through the Scientific Outlook on Development, which aimed to build a "Harmonious Socialist Society". Under his leadership, the authorities also cracked down on social disturbances, ethnic minority protests, and dissident figures which also led to many controversial events such as the unrest in Tibet and the passing of the Anti-Secession Law. In foreign policy, Hu advocated for "China's peaceful development", pursuing soft power in international relations and a corporate approach to diplomacy. Throughout Hu's tenure, China's influence in Africa, Latin America, and other developing regions increased.

In Latin America, the Pink tide was a political wave and perception of a turn towards left-wing governments in Latin American democracies moving away from the neoliberal economic model at the start of the 21st century. The ideology of such governments was variously described as post-neoliberalism or socialism of the 21st century. Leaders who have advocated for this form of socialism include Hugo Chávez of Venezuela, Néstor Kirchner of Argentina, Rafael Correa of Ecuador, Evo Morales of Bolivia and Luiz Inácio Lula da Silva of Brazil. Following its Bolivarian Revolution, Venezuela tried to export its ideology of Bolivarianism into other countries of the region, establishing and seating regional organisations such as ALBA, the Community of Latin American and Caribbean States, and Petrocaribe. Some pink tide governments have been varyingly characterized by some of its critics as being "anti-American" and populist, and, particularly in the case of Venezuela and Nicaragua, as authoritarian.

==== 2010s ====
The Arab Spring was a series of anti-government protests, uprisings, and armed rebellions that spread across much of the Arab world in the early 2010s. It began in response to corruption and economic stagnation and was influenced by the Tunisian Revolution. From Tunisia, the protests then spread to five other countries: Libya, Egypt, Yemen, Syria, and Bahrain, where either the ruler was deposed (Zine El Abidine Ben Ali, Muammar Gaddafi, Hosni Mubarak, and Ali Abdullah Saleh) or major uprisings and social violence occurred including riots, civil wars, or insurgencies. Sustained street demonstrations also took place in Morocco, Iraq, Algeria, Lebanon, Jordan, Kuwait, Oman, and Sudan. The wave of initial revolutions and protests faded by mid-2012, as many Arab Spring demonstrations met with violent responses from authorities, as well as from pro-government militias, counter-demonstrators, and militaries. Large-scale conflicts resulted: the Syrian Civil War; the rise of ISIL, insurgency in Iraq and the following civil war; the Egyptian Crisis, coup, and subsequent unrest and insurgency; the Libyan Civil War; and the Yemeni Crisis and following civil war. Some referred to the succeeding conflicts as the Arab Winter. Among the effects of the conflicts were the 2015 European migrant crisis.

The handling of the European debt crisis led to the premature end of several European national governments and influenced the outcome of many elections. Following the May 2012 Greek parliamentary election where the popularity of PASOK dropped from 42.5% in 2010 to as low as 7% in some polls in 2012, the term Pasokification was subsequently coined to describe the decline of centre-left social-democratic political parties in European and other Western countries during the 2010s, often accompanied by the rise of nationalist, left-wing and right-wing populist alternatives. In Europe, the share of votes for such parties was at its 70-year lowest in 2015. Populist and far-right political parties in turn proved very successful throughout Europe in the late-2010s. The 2017 French presidential election caused a radical shift in French politics, as the prevailing parties of The Republicans and Socialists failed to make it to the second round of voting, with far-right Marine Le Pen and political newcomer Emmanuel Macron instead facing each other.

On 22 February 2014, Ukrainian president Viktor Yanukovych was ousted from office as a result of the Euromaidan and the Revolution of Dignity, which broke out after his decision to reject the European Union–Ukraine Association Agreement and instead pursue closer ties with Russia and the Eurasian Economic Union. Shortly after Yanukovych's overthrow and exile to Russia, Ukraine's eastern and southern regions erupted with pro-Russia unrest. Simultaneously, unmarked Russian troops moved into Ukraine's Crimea and took control of strategic positions and infrastructure, including the Crimean Parliament on 27 February 2014, subsequently annexing the region. In April 2014, Russian separatists in eastern Ukraine proclaimed the establishment of the Donetsk People's Republic (in Ukraine's Donetsk Oblast) and the Luhansk People's Republic (in Ukraine's Luhansk Oblast) with direct Russian military involvement in the subsequent War in Donbas against Ukraine.

In the United Kingdom, as part of a campaign pledge to win votes from Eurosceptics, Conservative prime minister David Cameron promised to hold a referendum if his government was re-elected. His government subsequently held a referendum on continued EU membership in 2016, in which voters chose to leave the EU with 51.9 per cent of the vote share. This led to his resignation, his replacement by Theresa May, and four years of negotiations with the EU on the terms of departure and on future relations, completed under a Boris Johnson government, with government control remaining with the Conservative Party in this period. In the United States, Donald Trump won the 2016 United States presidential election as the Republican nominee against Democratic nominee Hillary Clinton. His political positions were described as populist, protectionist, isolationist, and nationalist.

In Asia, neo-nationalism spread successfully as well. Chinese Communist Party general secretary Xi Jinping's concept of "Chinese Dream" was described as an expression of new nationalism. It pride in the historic Chinese civilisation, embracing the teachings of Confucius and other ancient Chinese sages, and thus rejecting the anti-Confucius campaign of Party chairman Mao Zedong. Indian Prime Minister Narendra Modi assumed office in 2014 as a member of the Rashtriya Swayamsevak Sangh (RSS), a right-wing paramilitary organisation aligned with the Bharatiya Janata Party, which has also been said to advocate a neo-nationalist ideology. In Japan, The 63rd Prime Minister Shinzō Abe (in office from 2012 to 2020), a member of the right-wing organisation Nippon Kaigi, also promoted ideas of new nationalism. The Philippine President Rodrigo Duterte (assumed office in 2016) and his party PDP-Laban adopted Filipino nationalism as a platform as well.

The conservative wave emerged in the mid-2010s in Latin America as the influence of leftist governments declined in Argentina as the conservative liberal Mauricio Macri succeeded the Peronist Cristina Fernández de Kirchner in 2015; in Brazil, there was Dilma Rousseff's impeachment process that resulted in Rousseff's departure and the rise of her Vice President Michel Temer to power in 2016; in Peru the conservative economist Pedro Pablo Kuczynski succeeded Ollanta Humala; in Chile the conservative Sebastián Piñera succeeded the socialist Michelle Bachelet in 2018 just as it was in 2010; and in 2018 the far-right congressman Jair Bolsonaro became 38th President of Brazil. However, a series of violent protests against austerity measures and income inequality scattered throughout Latin America have also recently occurred including the 2019–20 Chilean protests, 2019–2020 Colombian protests, 2018–19 Haitian protests, 2019 Ecuadorian protests and the 2021 Colombian protests. A resurgence of the pink tide, however, was kicked off by Mexico in 2018 and Argentina in 2019.

==== 2020s ====
In 2022, Russia invaded Ukraine and began several military and military-civilian administrations across captured regions. On March 2, Russia captured the city of Kherson, the capital of Kherson Oblast. After capturing the city, the Russian military began a military occupation of the city. On April 26, Russia unseated Mayor Ihor Kolykhaiev and replaced him with former KGB agent Oleksandr Kobets as the mayor of Kherson. Russia also appointed Vladimir Saldo the new regional administrator for Kherson Oblast.

In 2023, following the Hamas attack on Israel, Israel began a counter invasion of the Gaza Strip to unseat and remove Hamas from political power and military control of the Gaza Strip. Near the end of 2023, Israel captured the city of Beit Hanoun and removed Hamas from power in the city. However, a week later, the Israeli military withdrew from the city, allowing Hamas to regain control militarily and politically.
