= History of politics =

History of politics may refer to:

- Political history
- History of political thought

== See also ==
- Political history of the world
