= Oleksandr Kobets =

Ukrainian and Russian politician (born 1959)

- Олександр Кобець
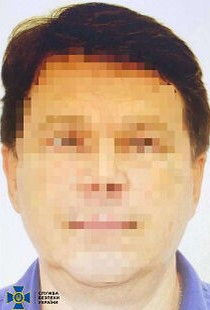
- Censored image of Kobets released by the SBU

Mayor of Kherson
- (contested)
- In office 26 April 2022 – 11 November 2022
- President: Vladimir Putin
- Governor: Vladimir Saldo
- Preceded by: Ihor Kolykhaiev (Note: The government of Kherson is disputed due to the 2022 Russian invasion of Ukraine. Kobets was installed by Russian authorities following Ihor Kolykhaiev's detention by Russia during the occupation of Kherson, while Ukraine continued to recognise him as mayor during Kobets's tenure.)
- Succeeded by: Halyna Luhova (Note: Ukraine regained control of the city following the Battle of Kherson in November 2022. They installed Luhova as Head of the Kherson Military Administration, although this position is not recognised by Russia which continues to claim Kherson as part of Russia.)

Personal details
- Born: Oleksandr Yuriyovych Kobets; 27 September 1959 (age 66) Kherson, Ukrainian SSR, Soviet Union
- Party: United Russia
- Spouse: Hanna Kobets
- Relations: Yuriy Kobets (father); Marianna Kobets (daughter)

Military service
- Allegiance: Soviet Union; Ukraine
- Branch/service: KGB; SBU
- Years of service: Until 1991 (KGB); 1991–2010 (SBU)

Oleksandr Yuriyovych Kobets (Note: Ukrainian: Олександр Юрійович Кобець; Russian: Александр Юрьевич Кобец, romanized: Aleksandr Yuryevich Kobets) (born 27 September 1959) is a Ukrainian and Russian politician, businessman, and former intelligence officer who served as the Russian-installed mayor of Kherson during the Russian occupation of the city, from 26 April 2022 until 11 November 2022, when Ukraine liberated the city.

== Biography ==
Kobets was born on 27 September 1959 in Kherson, in what was then the Ukrainian Soviet Socialist Republic of the Soviet Union.

=== KGB career ===
Kobets served as a KGB officer until 1991, when he started working for the Security Service of Ukraine (SBU). Kobets supervised economic issues in the 1990s, in particular, the work of the Kherson Oil Refinery. In the early 2000s, Kobets was transferred to the head office of the SBU and served as an officer in the operational leadership of the SBU. A pensioner by seniority, he retired from the SBU in 2010.

In his resume, which was compiled in September 2020, he writes that "during his work in the special services, he cooperated with structural units of the Cabinet of Ministers, Ministry of Finance, Ministry of Economy, National Bank, State Property Fund, Antimonopoly Committee, Ministry of Energy and Coal Industry, Naftogaz, Ministry of Industrial Policy, Ministry of Agrarian Policy and Food, Ministry of Health. He carried out measures on financial, energy, food, and environmental security of the state." Oleksandr Kobets wanted to get a position in one of the companies in Kyiv, but was not hired.

=== Activities in retirement ===
Following his retirement, Kobets, together with his wife, founded a company which handles contract mediation for goods, production of juices, mineral water, soft drinks, and trade. The Centre for Journalistic Investigations revealed that Kobets has not repaid a loan of 80,000 dollars for several years.

In the summer of 2006, Oleksandr Kobets registered with Ukragrohimpromholding OJSC, which traded in ammonia and was founded by Oleksandr Bessonov, a former agent of the KGB and a citizen of the Russian Federation with a passport.

In 2007, he got a job at the Ukrainian Collection Agency company, dealing with personnel issues and official investigations.

Kobets then worked at RSB Petroleum FZC in the United Arab Emirates from 2008 to 2011. This company was engaged in trading in petroleum products and oil.

In 2012, he was the director of Transocean Ukraine Export LLC, which traded machines and equipment. In the same year, Oleksandr Kobets got a job as an adviser to the head of the Shevchenkiv district administration of Kyiv.

From 2015 to 2018, he worked at Alfa-Bank, where he managed internal security.

From 2018 to 2020, he held the position of head of internal security at VK Tobacco and Sich Bank.

Prior to the Russian invasion of Ukraine, Kobets lived in Kyiv.

=== Collaborationism during the Russian invasion (2022) ===
Oleksandr Kobets left Kyiv on March 7 in a Mercedes-Benz, registered to his wife Hanna Kobets. On 15 March he left Ukraine through the city of Uzhhorod.

On 26 April, during the Russian occupation of Kherson, Kobets was appointed Mayor of Kherson by the Russian military. The start of his term was marked by protests against the Russian occupation of Kherson. On 11 November 2022 the city of Kherson was liberated by the Ukrainian army. After his departure from Kherson, he was transferred to Henichesk to work on establishing local pro-Russian administrative bodies in the city.

On 1 January 2026, he was formally found guilty in absentia by the Khadzhybeyskyi District Court of Odesa for committing crimes under the Criminal Code of Ukraine, specifically under Part 2 of Article 111 and Part 5 of Article 111-1.

== Sanctions ==
In July 2022, the European Union imposed sanctions on Oleksandr Kobets in relation to the Russian invasion of Ukraine.

He was additionally sanctioned by the United Kingdom government in 2022 in relation to the Russo-Ukrainian War.

== Family ==
Oleksandr Kobets's has a wife named Hanna Kobets and a daughter named Marianna Kramer (Kobets). His father is Yuriy Kobets.
