= Kherson City Council =

Legislature of Kherson, Ukraine

Kherson City Council Херсонська міська рада

Type
- Type: Unicameral

Leadership
- Chairman: Ihor Kolykhaiev, We Have to Live Here; 27 November 2020 – 28 June 2022 (Note: During the Russian occupation of Kherson, Kolykhaiev was abducted by Russian forces, thereby de facto ending his term)

Structure
- Seats: 54
- Political groups: Opposition Platform — For Life (6); We Have to Live Here (12); Servant of the People (8); European Solidarity (5); Volodymyr Saldo Bloc (4) (Note: Since the war, the remaining members reorganized under the name "Support to the programs of the President of Ukraine", signalling support for president Volodymyr Zelenskyy.); Vacant (19) (Note: 17 of them resigned, while 2 were terminated due to treason)
- Length of term: 5 years

Elections
- Last election: 25 October 2020
- Next election: 2025 (May be postponed due to martial law in Ukraine)

Meeting place
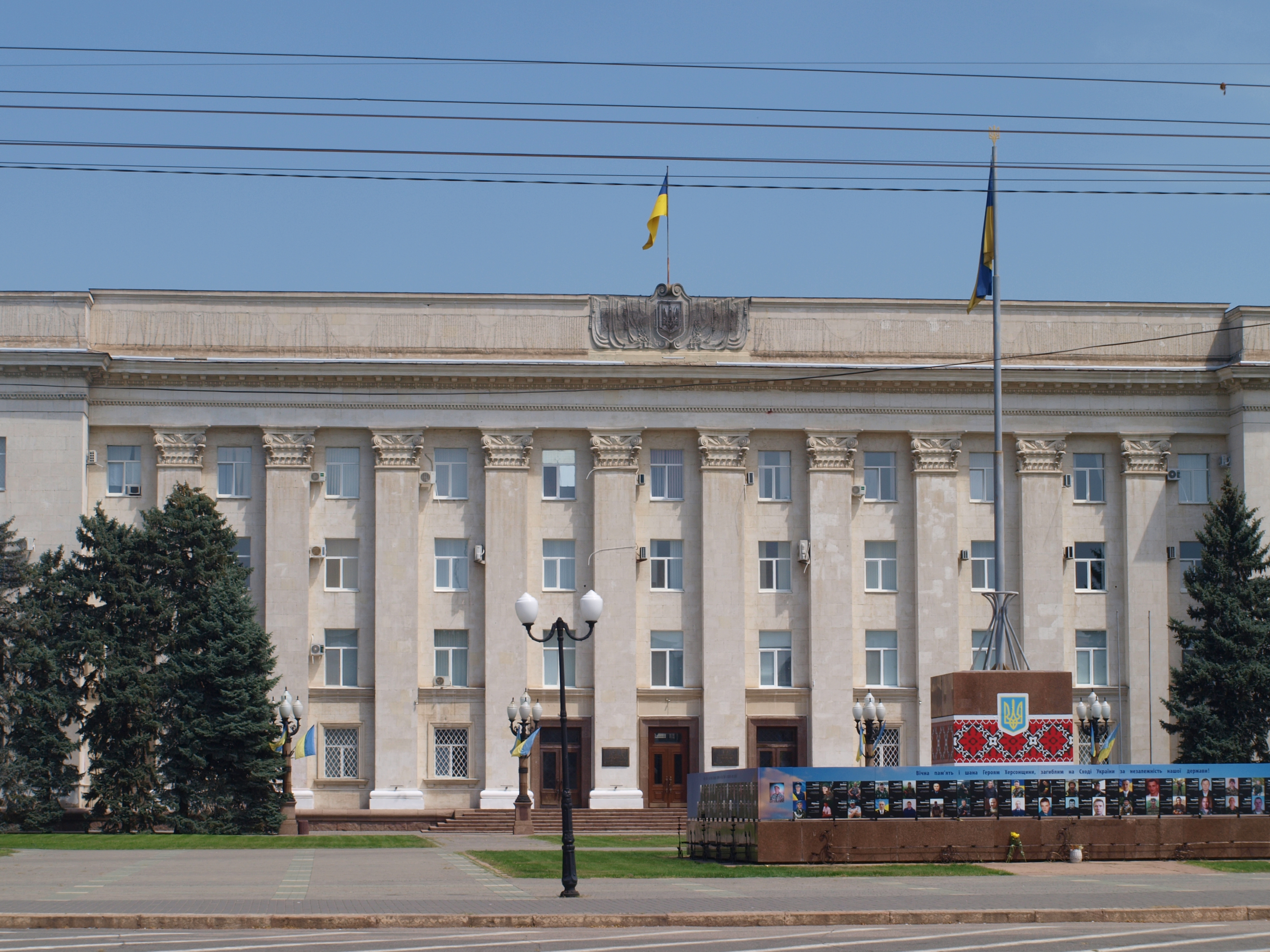

Website
- miskrada-ks.gov.ua

Kherson City Council (Ukrainian: Херсонська міська рада) is the municipal council governing the Ukrainian city of Kherson.

== History ==
=== 2020 local elections ===
On October 25, 2020, the 2020 Ukrainian local elections were held in Kherson. The results were as follows:

Kherson City Council election, 2020
Party	Percentage of vote	Seats
We Have to Live Here!	23.1%	17 seats
Opposition Platform – For Life	14.5%	11 seats
Servant of the People	13.0%	10 seats
Volodymyr Saldo Bloc	11.8%	9 seats
European Solidarity	8.6%	

In the election, the parties that were more pro-Russian and Euroskeptic, including Opposition Platform, Volodymyr Saldo Bloc, and Party of Shariy (3.9%) had a combined vote share just over 30%, and won 20 out of 54 seats.

=== Russian invasion of Ukraine ===
Since the beginning of the Russian invasion of Ukraine in February 2022, the council has not held meetings. Additionally, 19 of the 54 total representatives in the council have either resigned, or have their position terminated due to wartime collaboration. This includes Volodymyr Saldo, leader of the Volodymyr Saldo Bloc, who later became head of the Russian occupation of Kherson Oblast. The parties Opposition Platform - For Life and Volodymyr Saldo Bloc, were suspended and later banned in 2022.
