= Halyna Luhova =

Ukrainian politician

- Галина Лугова

Head of the Kherson City Military Administration
- In office 21 September 2022 – 2 March 2023
- President: Volodymyr Zelenskyy
- Preceded by: Position established
- Succeeded by: Roman Mrochko

Personal details
- Born: 10 April 1976 (age 50) Antonivka, Ukrainian SSR, Soviet Union (now Ukraine)
- Party: We Have to Live Here
- Children: 2
- Education: Kherson State University

Halyna Leonidivna Luhova (Ukrainian: Галина Леонідівна Лугова; born 10 April 1976) is a Ukrainian politician who served as the head of the Kherson City Military Administration from 2022 to 2023.

== Life ==
Luhova was born on 10 April 1976 in Antonivka, Kherson Oblast. She studied foreign languages at the Kherson State University. She was a school teacher and was the head of the Antonivsk comprehensive school of grades 1 to 3 No. 21 of the Kherson City Council.

Luhova became a politician in 2015. During the 2020 Ukrainian local elections, she was elected to the Kherson City Council as a member of the party We Have to Live Here. In 2020, she was appointed as secretary of the city council. On September 21, 2022, following the abduction of city mayor Ihor Kolykhaiev, Luhova was appointed by President Volodymyr Zelenskyy as head of the Kherson City Military Administration. Luhova performs the functions of mayor. During her tenure, she was the only female mayor of a major city in Ukraine. Due to her position, Luhova became a target during the Russian occupation of Kherson Oblast. Luhova was dismissed from her position as head of the Kherson City Military Administration after president Volodymyr Zelenskyy signed a decree on March 2, 2023 appointing military prosecutor Roman Mrochko as the new head of the Kherson City Military Administration.

Luhova has two sons.
