= Kherson Oblast Council =

Legislature of Kherson Oblast, Ukraine

Kherson Oblast Council Херсонська обласна рада

Type
- Type: Unicameral
- Houses: 1
- Established: 1991

Leadership
- Speaker: Oleksandr Samoilenko, Servant of the People since 4 December, 2020

Structure
- Seats: 64
- Political groups: Government (39): Opposition Platform — For Life (15); We Have to Live Here (13); Servant of the People (11); Opposition (25): European Solidarity (7); Our Land (7); Fatherland (6); Volodymyr Saldo Bloc (5), activities banned by the court

Elections
- First election: 26 June 1994
- Last election: 25 October 2020

Meeting place
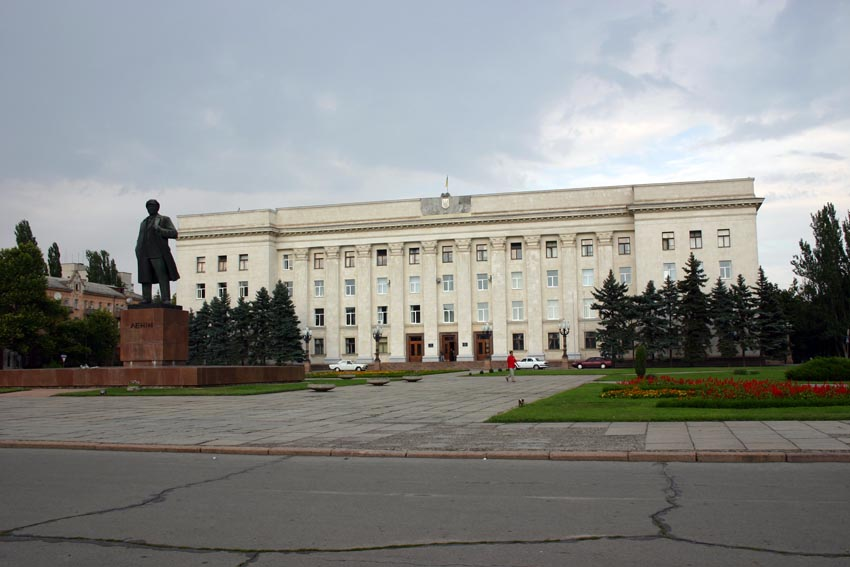
- 1 Freedom Square, Kherson, Ukraine; 46°38′25″N 32°36′57″E

Website
- khor.gov.ua

The Kherson Oblast Council (Ukrainian: Херсонська обласна рада) is the regional oblast council (parliament) of the Kherson Oblast (province) located in Southern Ukraine.

Council members are elected for five year terms. In order to gain representation in the council, a party must gain more than 5 percent of the total vote.

During the Russian takeover and occupation of the oblast, the activities of the Council were temporarily suspended. A collaborationist entity called Salvation Committee for Peace and Order began to operate in its place. Activities of the Council resumed in November 2022.

The Kherson Oblast State Administration building was partially destroyed by a Russian airstrike on 5 June 2025.

== Recent elections ==
=== 2020 ===
Distribution of seats after the 2020 Ukrainian local elections

- 15 Opposition Platform — For Life (banned by the court, the members joined other political parties)
- 13 We Have to Live Here
- 11 Servant of the People
- 7 European Solidarity
- 7 Our Land
- 6 Fatherland
- 5 Volodymyr Saldo Bloc (activities banned by the court)

Election date was 25 October 2020

Note: On 20 March 2022 the faction of the Volodymyr Saldo Bloc ceased to exist. Its deputies joined the newly formed faction "Support to the programs of the President of Ukraine".

=== 2015 ===
Distribution of seats after the 2015 Ukrainian local elections

- 18 Solidarity
- 13 Opposition Bloc
- 9 Fatherland
- 7 Our Land
- 6 Radical Party
- 6 UKROP
- 5 Self Reliance

Election date was 25 October 2015

== Chairmen ==
=== Regional executive committee ===
- Filipp Pasenchenko-Demidenko (1944–1950)
- Timofey Barilnik (1950–1963)
- Nikolai Kobak (industrial, 1963–1964)
- Nikolai Makushenko (agrarian, 1963–1964)
- Nikolai Makushenko (1964–1969)
- Dina Protsenko (1969–1978)
- Vasily Metlyaev (1978–1983)
- Mykhailo Kushnerenko (1983–1987)
- Oleksandr Melnikov (1987–1991)
- Mykhailo Kushnerenko (1991–1992)

=== Regional council ===
- Mykhailo Kushnerenko (1990–1994)
- Vitaliy Zholobov (1994–1996)
- Valerii Tretyakov (1996–2002)
- Anatoliy Yurchenko (2002)
- Volodymyr Khodakovsky (2002–2006)
- Hennadiy Prychyna (acting, 2006)
- Volodymyr Demyokhin (2006–2010)
- Viktor Pelykh (2010–2014)
- Tamara Fedko (acting, 2014–2015)
- Andriy Putilov (2015–2016)
- Vladyslav Manger (2016–2020)
- Oleksandr Samoilenko (since 2020)
