= Vladimir Saldo =

Russian and Ukrainian politician (born 1956)

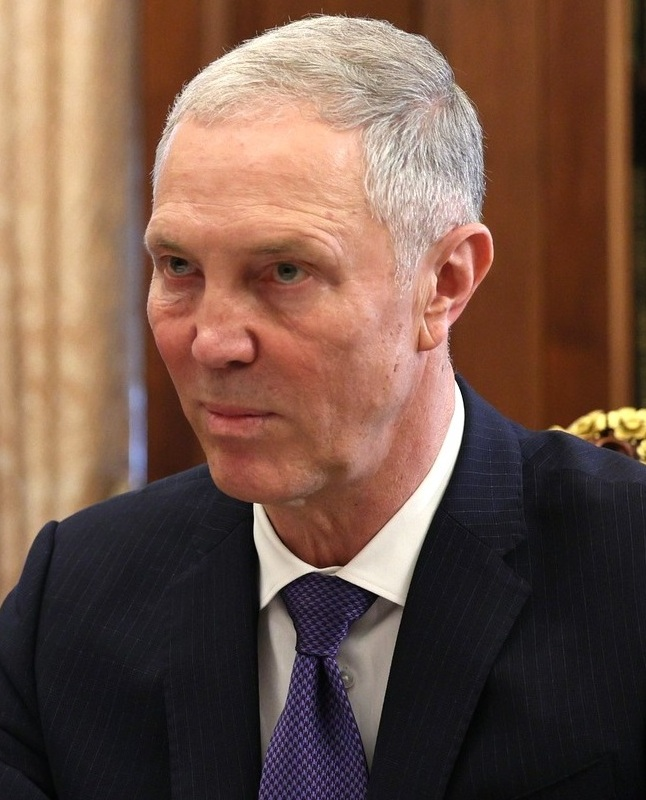
- Saldo in 2023

Governor of Kherson Oblast
- Incumbent
- Assumed office 23 September 2023
- President: Vladimir Putin
- Preceded by: Position established

Head of the Kherson Military-Civilian Administration
- In office 26 April 2022 – 4 October 2022
- Preceded by: Position established
- Succeeded by: Position abolished

Member of the Kherson Oblast Council
- In office 27 November 2015 – 26 April 2022

People's Deputy Verkhovna Rada of Ukraine
- In office 12 December 2012 – 27 November 2014
- Constituency: Party of Regions, N 182

Mayor of Kherson
- In office 12 April 2002 – 25 May 2014
- Preceded by: Mykola Ordynskyy
- Succeeded by: Volodymyr Mykolayenko

Personal details
- Born: 12 June 1956 (age 70) Zhovtneve, Ukrainian SSR, Soviet Union
- Party: Independent (1998–2001); Party of Regions (2001–2014); Our Land (2014–2019); Volodymyr Saldo Bloc (2019–2022); United Russia (2022–present)
- Children: 1
- Education: Kryvyi Rih Mining Institute

Vladimir Vasilyevich Saldo (Russian: Владимир Васильевич Сальдо, Ukrainian: Володимир Васильович Сальдо, romanized: Volodymyr Vasylovych Saldo; born 12 June 1956) is a Russian and former Ukrainian politician serving as the governor of the Russian-occupied Kherson Oblast since 23 September 2023.

Saldo served three terms as mayor of Kherson from 2002 to 2012, and later as a People's Deputy in the Verkhovna Rada Ukraine from 2012 to 2014, representing the Party of Regions.

== Early life and engineering career ==
Saldo was born on 12 June 1956 in the town of Zhovtneve, Mykolaiv Oblast, in what was then Ukrainian Soviet Socialist Republic of the Soviet Union. In 1978 he graduated from the Kryvyi Rih Mining Institute with a degree in industrial and civil construction. He specialized as a civil engineer and earned a PhD in economics in 2008. From 1978 to 2001, he worked as an engineer and head of installation departments at the Khersonpromstroy plant.

== Political career in Ukraine ==
=== Low-level Kherson Oblast politics (1998–2002) ===
Saldo was elected to the Kherson City Council in 1998, and served in his position for three years. In 2001, he joined the Party of Regions and was named the head of its regional branch in Kherson Oblast. In 2001, he was named deputy governor of Kherson Oblast, in charge of construction, housing and communal services, and served until 2002.

=== Mayor of Kherson (2002–2012) ===
In 2002, Saldo ran in the elections for mayor of Kherson. He won the race against Serhiy Sokolov, the former head of traffic police in Crimea by only 20,000 votes. In 2005, ahead of the upcoming 2006 elections, in which Saldo would have once again faced Sokolov as his main opponent, Sokolov died in a car accident. During the election itself in 2006, Saldo won re-election to a second term. That same year, Saldo was also named the head of the Party of Regions branch in Kherson city. Saldo won re-election to a third term in 2010, and served as mayor until 2012.

The Association for the Reintegration of Crimea reported after the Russian invasion of Ukraine in March 2022 that Saldo's ten-year mayoralty was a "time of total embezzlement and corruption that entangled all spheres of the city's life, at times grandiose scandals". Kherson journalist Konstantin Ryzhenko said that "Saldo has become a symbol of decline, economic ruin, corruption, forcible takeovers and gang violence", and that the former mayor's name was "connected to a few very suspicious deaths", none of which were "investigated properly".

=== People's Deputy of Ukraine (2012–2015) ===
Saldo was elected a People's Deputy of Ukraine in the 2012 Ukrainian parliamentary elections and served until 2015. Following his election, he was named the deputy chairman of the Verkhovna Rada's committee for construction, urban planning, housing and communal services and regional policy.

During the Revolution of Dignity, Saldo became a recurring figure on Russian state TV, and actively condemned the Euromaidan protests. He voted for the set of anti-protest laws, also called the "dictatorship laws", on 16 January 2014.

=== Kherson City Councillor (2015–2022) ===
After the end of the Revolution of Dignity, Saldo experienced a political decline. He joined the Our Land party, described as a popular destination party for former Party of Regions members. In 2015, he ran for Mayor of Kherson as a member of Our Land, but lost. He was later elected as a deputy in the Kherson City Council once again, where he served as a leader of Our Land.

In 2019, he founded the Volodymyr Saldo Bloc political party, and in 2020 was re-elected to the City Council, while finishing second in the mayoral election again, losing to Ihor Kolykhaiev.

== Collaboration with Russia during the Russian invasion of Ukraine (2022–present) ==
Following the start of the Russian invasion of Ukraine, Saldo took a pro-Russian position. On 13 March, he took part in a pro-Russian rally in Kherson. Saldo stated that he did not support the creation of a "people's republic" in Kherson Oblast, and said his collaboration was driven by a desire to maintain Kherson as part of Ukraine. The head of the Volodymyr Saldo Bloc on the Kherson Oblast Council, Valery Lytvyn, sent a letter to the first deputy chairman of the Oblast Council Yuriy Sobolevsky, stating that the deputies did not agree with Saldo's choice to attend the 13 March rally. Deputies of the bloc announced that they would continue their activities in the Kherson Oblast Council as part of a new faction, titled the "Support to the programs of the President of Ukraine" faction.

Saldo received attention following his participation in a meeting of the Salvation Committee for Peace and Order, a Russian-established government organ in Kherson Oblast. Following the meeting, Olga Spivakina, a deputy of the Kherson City Council, posted Saldo's statement on Facebook, in which he said he had been taken captive and forced to participate in the meeting. Saldo was officially appointed head of Kherson military-civilian administration by the Russian military on 26 April 2022. Following a Ukrainian missile attack on Kherson on 27 April, Saldo stated that "Kyiv abandoned people from Kherson".

On 20 December 2022, President Putin awarded Saldo the Order "For Merit to the Fatherland".

=== Integration of Kherson Oblast into Russia ===
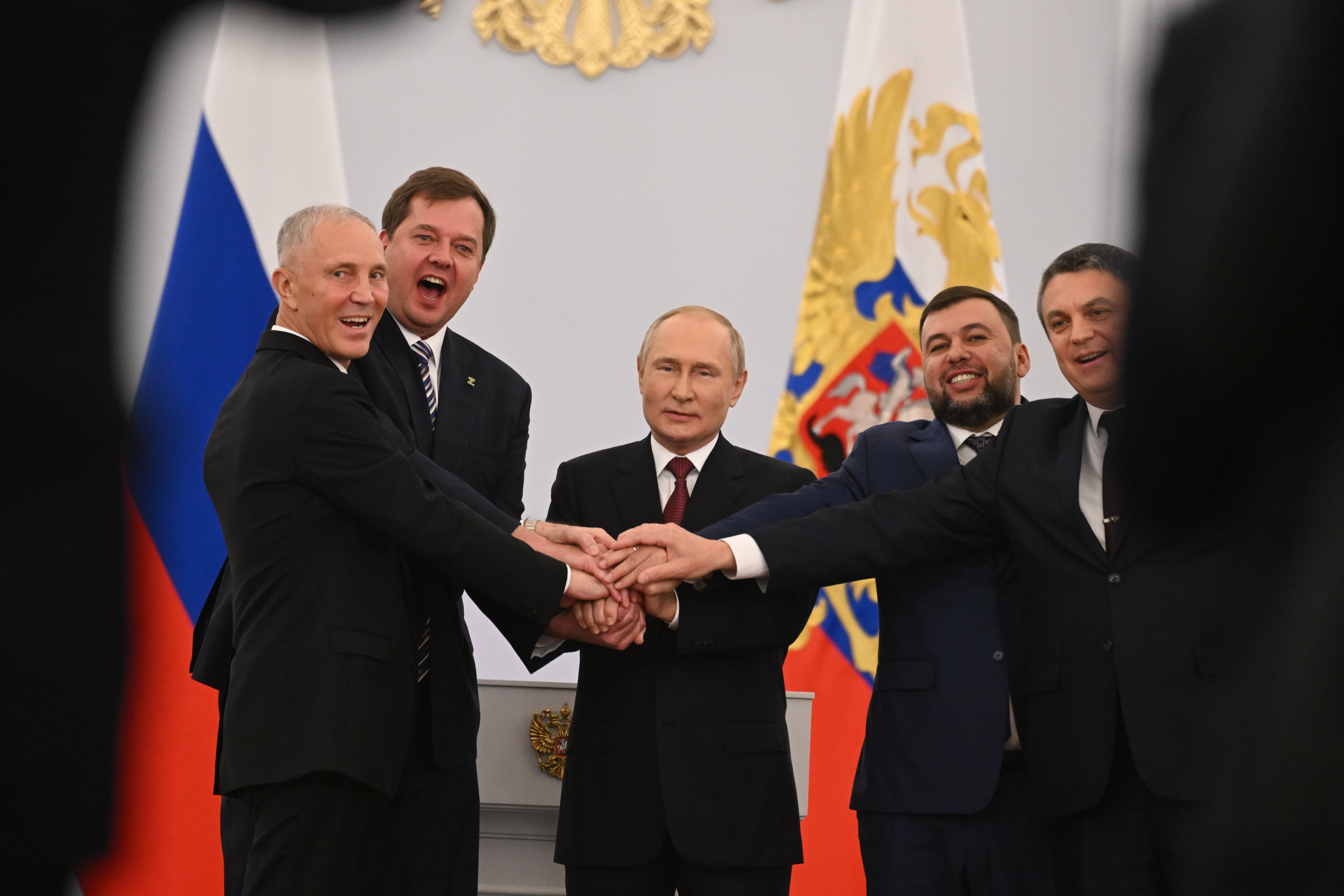
Saldo (left) and three other Russian-installed oblast leaders shaking hands with Vladimir Putin to celebrate the annexations

On 6 May 2022, Saldo met with Denis Pushilin, head of the Donetsk People's Republic, and Andrey Turchak, secretary of the general council of United Russia. During an interview on the same day, Saldo stated that Kherson Oblast was already an "integral part of the big family of Russia". On 11 June, he received a Russian passport, and was quoted as saying "For me, this is a truly historic moment. I have always thought that we [Ukraine and Russia] are one country and one people."

On September 20, Saldo announced via the messaging app Telegram that the Kherson region, where Russian forces occupied about 95% of the region at the time, would hold a referendum on joining Russia, saying that he hoped the region would become "a part of Russia, a fully-fledged subject of a united country." The referendum began on September 23, at the same time as referendums in three other occupied regions. The referendums were declared invalid and illegal by the United Nations General Assembly. Saldo claimed victory on social media after the self-styled referendum ended in a 87% vote for 'yes', saying that "It's already clear that the vast majority of people supported the issue of secession from Ukraine and joining Russia".

On September 30, together with the other pro-Russian occupation heads Denis Pushilin, Leonid Pasechnik and Yevgeny Balitsky, Saldo attended in Moscow the ceremony in which Vladimir Putin formally announced the annexation of the Donetsk, Kherson, Luhansk and Zaporizhzhia oblasts.

In December 2022, Saldo became a member of the regional political council of United Russia in the occupied Kherson Oblast.

=== Administration and projects in the occupied oblast ===
On 29 April 2022, Saldo stated that official languages in the Kherson Oblast will be both Ukrainian and Russian, and that the International Settlements Bank from South Ossetia would soon open 200 branches in Kherson Oblast.

In late October, as Ukrainian troops advanced on Kherson, Saldo's administration ordered all residents to evacuate the city. On November 8, just before Russian troops announced their withdrawal, Saldo's Deputy Kirill Stremousov was killed in a car crash. After Ukrainian troops retook Kherson, the pro-Russian administration centre was temporarily relocated to Henichesk.

In December 2022, Saldo announced plans to build a planned city on the Arabat Spit. In March 2023, Kherson Regional Council deputy Serhii Khlan, along with locals, reported that construction of the city had accelerated, with "guest workers" shipped in to work on it.

In late 2022, Saldo was bit on the hand by the raccoon of Kherson.

On 6 April 2023, Saldo, along with the three other occupation officials, had a one-on-one meeting with Vladimir Putin. The two discussed gas supply issues in Russian-occupied areas of Kherson Oblast.

On 6 June 2023, amidst the extreme flooding in Kherson Oblast caused by the destruction of the Kakhovka Dam, Saldo accused Ukraine of perpetrating a missile attack on the dam. He said the situation was "manageable", and that no major evacuation was required. In a video, Saldo said that life was going on as normal, saying "I just drove through the streets. Petrol stations are working, some shops are working, even businesses are working." In the video, visibly flooded streets can be seen behind Saldo.

=== Assassination attempts ===
Throughout the occupation, Ukrainian partisans have repeatedly tried to assassinate Saldo.

On 20 March 2022, Saldo's aide Pavel Slobodchikov was assassinated in Kherson by being shot and killed in his car.

On 5 August 2022, Russian authorities announced that Saldo would be transferred to Moscow for medical treatment, after a "Minister of Health" approached him insisting on a medical examination by doctors on hand in his office, against his will. Following his departure to Russia, he was replaced by Sergei Yeliseyev. It was initially reported by RT that Saldo had suffered from a stroke and was comatose. Saldo's deputy Kirill Stremousov, said that such reports were, "part of Ukraine's information war against Russia." Some reports said he was poisoned on that day. According to Russian (RIA Novosti and Lenta.ru) and Ukrainian media reports, on September 12, Saldo died in intensive care after alleged poisoning. Soon, articles in the Russian media about his death were deleted. Kirill Stremousov also wrote about the supposed death of Saldo, but then deleted the post. On 19 September 2022, Ria Novosti reported that Saldo had returned to "fulfilling his duties".

=== Legal consequences ===
==== Sanctions ====
On 3 June 2022, he was sanctioned by the European Union due to his role in the Russian occupation of Kherson Oblast and for providing support and promoting policies that undermine the territorial integrity, sovereignty and independence of Ukraine. Following the placement of EU sanctions, the Czech Ministry of Finance announced that they had launched an investigation into Saldo's ownership of part of the Czech company Agriatis. Saldo had bought part of the company in 2015, which was mostly owned by his Ukrainian partner Volodymyr Erekhynskyi.

He was sanctioned by the UK government in 2022 in relation to the Russo-Ukrainian War.

==== Prosecution by Ukraine ====
On 17 March, the Office of the Prosecutor General of Ukraine opened proceedings on treason related to the "creation of a pseudo-authority in the Kherson Oblast," with Saldo as a prime suspect in the case. The Volodymyr Saldo Bloc party's activities were suspended by the National Security and Defense Council on 20 March, for having ties to Russia. On 14 June the Eighth Administrative Court of Appeal banned the party's activities.

On 29 April 2022, the Ukrainian prosecutor pressed treason charges against Saldo for his collaborationism.

In early January 2023, the Ukrainian State Bureau of Investigation and the Kherson Oblast prosecutor's office raided Saldo's home. According to their findings, Saldo had been given direct orders from Russian higher-ups to commit crimes against Ukraine. Information was also uncovered about the structure of the occupation regime and salaries paid in rubles.

== Legal issues ==
In 2016, Saldo was held in the Dominican Republic for three months after he was accused of kidnapping and torturing Denys Pashchenko, a 33-year-old Ukrainian businessman who allegedly owed him and his partner $334,000. Saldo later said that Pashchenko had held Saldo hostage and tortured him via electrocution into speaking phrases, which Pashchenko "edit[ed] together" to create a false confession of Saldo collaborating with Russia. A year later, Denys's brother Igor Pashchenko was murdered "contract-style" with two gunshots to the head. His relatives have said that Saldo ordered Pashchenko's death.

== Honours ==
=== Orders ===
Award or decoration	Country/entity	Date
Order of Merit	Ukraine	17 May 1999
Order of St. Sergius of Radonezh	Russian Orthodox Church	2005
Order of Merit	Ukraine	6 December 2006
Order of the Holy Apostle John the Theologian	Ukrainian Orthodox Church	2008
Order of Merit	Ukraine	23 August 2011
Order "For Merit to the Fatherland"	Russia	20 December 2022

== See also ==
- Collaboration with Russia during the Russian invasion of Ukraine
