= Volodymyr Saldo Bloc =

Political party in Ukraine

Volodymyr Saldo Bloc Блок Володимира Сальдо Блок Владимира Сальдо
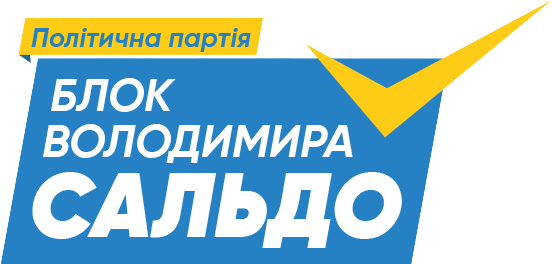
- Abbreviation: BVS
- Leader: Volodymyr Saldo
- Chairman: Iryna Khrunyk
- Founded: 3 April 2019
- Banned: 20 March 2022 (suspended); 14 June 2022 (banned)
- Split from: Our Land
- Merged into: United Russia
- Headquarters: Kherson
- Ideology: Kherson regionalism Decentralization; Russophilia
- Political position: Centre
- Colours: Blue; Yellow

Website
- Facebook page

The Volodymyr Saldo Bloc (Ukrainian: Блок Володимира Сальдо, romanized: Blok Volodymyra Saldo, Russian: Блок Владимира Сальдо, romanized: Blok Vladimira Saldo, abbr. БВС or BVS) was a minor political party in Kherson Oblast, Ukraine headed by Volodymyr Saldo. The party was founded in 2019 and won 5 seats in the Kherson Oblast Council in the 2020 local elections, while Saldo finished second in the mayoral election.

Following their opposition to Saldo's activities in Russian-occupied Kherson in 2022, deputies of the Saldo Bloc announced that they would be serving in the "Support to the programs of the President of Ukraine" faction. On 20 March 2022, the party's activities were suspended by the National Security and Defense Council for the duration of martial law due to allegations by the Council that the party had ties to Russia. The party chair at the time was Iryna Khrunyk. On 14 June 2022, the Eighth Administrative Court of Appeal banned the party's activities.
