= Dina Protsenko =

Soviet Ukrainian politician (1926–2006)

Dina Iosypivna Protsenko (Ukrainian: Діна Йосипівна Проценко; 21 January 1926, Kherson — 30 July 2006, Kherson) was a Soviet and Ukrainian politician.

She was appointed Chairperson of the State-Committee of the Protection of Nature in 1975.
