= We Have to Live Here =

We Have to Live Here Нам тут жити
- Leader: Hennadiy Lahuta
- Founder: Ihor Kolykhaiev
- Founded: December 16, 2014
- Headquarters: Kherson
- Ideology: Social democracy; Regionalism
- Political position: Centre-left
- Colours: Blue
- Kherson Oblast Council: 13 / 64
- Kherson City Council: 12 / 76

Website
- namtutzhyty.com

We Have to Live Here (Full name: Ihor Kolykhaiev Party — We Have to Live Here; Ukrainian: Партія Ігоря Колихаєва «Нам тут жити», romanized: Partiia Ihoria Kolykhaieva «Nam tut zhyty»), is a Ukrainian political party established in December 2014, and is most active in Kherson Oblast.

== History ==
=== Establishment as "Renaissance of Ukraine" ===
In July 2014, a group of public figures, including Professor Fedir Kyryliuk, writer Petro Osadchuk, and Halyna Vysotska, joined together and held a meeting in Kyiv to create a new political party. On December 12, 2014, they registered a new party called "Renaissance of Ukraine" («Відродження України»).

The party is engaged in social work, volunteer activities, assistance to Ukrainian military personnel in the ATO zone, control of the government, and advocates for the concept of "equal opportunities" in Ukrainian society.

=== Rebranding as "We Have to Live Here" ===
On February 11, 2020, the party was renamed to its current name, called "Ihor Kolykhaiev Party — We Have to Live Here", and its headquarters were moved to Kherson. Currently, the party leader is Hennadiy Lahuta, who used to work as Ihor Kolykhaiev's assistant.

During the 2020 Ukrainian local elections, the party won 13 out of 64 seats in the Kherson Oblast Council. At the same time, Ihor Kolykhaiev won the mayoral election in Kherson with this party, becoming the next mayor.
