= Salvation Committee for Peace and Order =

Russian Military Government in Kherson Oblast, Ukraine

- Russian: Комитет спасения за мир и порядок Ukrainian: Комітет порятунку за мир та порядок
- Coat of arms and flag designed by Russia for its occupational administration in Kherson Oblast

Overview
- Established: 10 March 2022
- Country: Kherson Oblast
- Leader: Kirill Stremousov (until his death on 9 November 2022)
- Headquarters: Henichesk (2022–now); Kherson (2022)

The Salvation Committee for Peace and Order (Russian: Комитет спасения за мир и порядок, romanized: Komitet spaseniya za myr i poryadok; Ukrainian: Комітет порятунку за мир та порядок, romanized: Komitet poriatunku za myr ta poriadok) is the collaborationist supreme administrative and executive authority in the territory of the Kherson Oblast, formed by the constituent Assembly on 10 March 2022 following the capture of most of the oblast's territory by Russian troops in the Russian invasion of Ukraine.

The committee was later transformed into the Kherson military-civilian administration.

After Ukraine took back control over the city of Kherson, the Committee fled to Henichesk on October 19, 2022.

== Formation ==
After the Russian army captured Kherson and occupied most of the region amidst the 2022 Russian invasion of Ukraine, former mayor of Kherson, Volodymyr Saldo, the former deputy mayor for Social and Humanitarian Affairs Serhiy (Sergey) Cherevko, as well as the director of the news agency Tavria News Kirill Stremousov, went to cooperate with Russia. As a result, on March 10, the "Salvation Committee for Peace and Order" was formed at the meeting, which declared its goal to 'maintain law and order in the territories of the region', as well as establishing trade, economic and socio-cultural ties with Russia.

The President of the Committee Stremousov died in a car crash on 9 November 2022. This left Saldo and the former mayor of the Russian city of Krasnodar, Andrey Alekseyenko, in charge.

== Activity ==
According to Nezavisimaya Gazeta, the activities of the committee encountered constant resistance among the population, and a number of its members were killed by the Ukrainian secret service Chief Directorate of Intelligence (GUR) or Ukrainian partisans.

So far, one of the most significant actions of the committee is the introduction of the Russian ruble on the territory of the Kherson Oblast.

== See also ==
- Russian occupation of Kharkiv Oblast
- Russian occupation of Zaporizhzhia Oblast
