= Ihor Kolykhaiev =

Ukrainian politician and entrepreneur (born 1971)

- Ігор Колихаєв
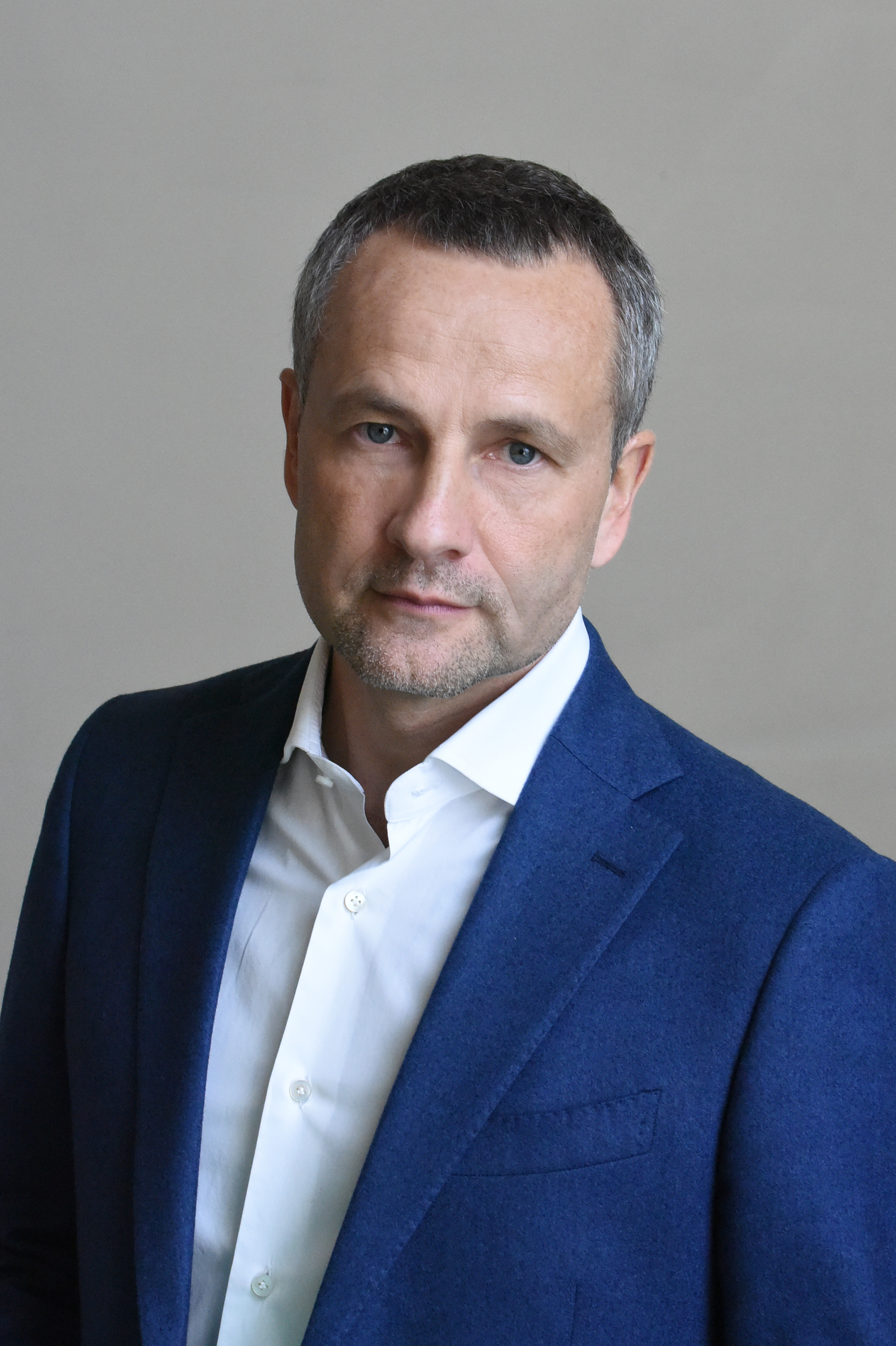
- Kolykhaiev in February 2020

Mayor of Kherson
- Incumbent
- In office 27 November 2020 – 28 June 2022 (de-facto, after going missing)
- Preceded by: Volodymyr Mykolaienko
- Succeeded by: Halyna Luhova (as Head of the Kherson City Military Administration)

Member of the Verkhovna Rada
- In office 29 August 2019 – 30 March 2021

Personal details
- Born: 8 May 1971 (age 55) Kherson, Ukrainian SSR, Soviet Union
- Education: A. Popov Navy Institute of Radio-electronics
- Profession: Entrepreneur; politician

Ihor Viktorovych Kolykhaiev (Ukrainian: Ігор Вікторович Колихаєв; born 8 May 1971) is a Ukrainian politician who has served as mayor of Kherson since the 2020 Ukrainian local elections. Kolykhaiev is former People's Deputy of Ukraine, elected in the 2019 Ukrainian parliamentary election.

On 28 June 2022, Kolykhaiev was abducted by Russian agents amidst the 2022 Russian invasion of Ukraine and the occupation of Kherson. His whereabouts became unknown until on 13 September 2023 the Red Cross confirmed to Kolykhaiev's son that his father's been added to the Russian list of prisoners and he was in Russia. According to his son, Sviatoslav, in June 2025, no information about Kolykhaiev's location or condition has been made public since February 2025, with the last reports stating Kolykhaiev was in poor condition with multiple ailments. Kolykhaiev remains in captivity even after the release of prior-Mayor of Kherson, Volodymyr Mykolaienko, from Russian captivity on 24 August 2025.

== Personal life ==
Ihor Kolykhaiev was born on 8 May 1971, in Kherson. His mother worked as a shop assistant, and his father as a lathe operator at the enterprise. After school graduation, he entered A. Popov Navy Institute of Radio-electronics in Saint Petersburg. Having got higher education, Kolykhaiev returned to his native city and in 1995 started to work as an entrepreneur. Kolykhaiev has two children.

In 2006, Yurii Bokalo established the futsal club, MFC Prodexim Kherson, named after Ihor Kolykhaev's enterprise ”Prodexim.”

In 2016, Kolykhaiev founded Ihor Kolykhaev's Charity Fund which is aimed at charity help to sportsmen and Kherson citizens.

== Political career ==
In October 2015, Ihor Kolykhaiev stood for becoming a deputy at Kherson Oblast Council in accordance with the lists of political party Petro Poroshenko Bloc. Having received 25.2% votes at the electoral ward, he was elected in the 2015 Ukrainian local elections a deputy of Kherson Oblast Council of the 7th convocation and in December 2015, he took the oath. On 21 July 2019, he was elected in the 2019 Ukrainian parliamentary election the people's deputy of Ukraine of the 9th convocation at 184 first past the post election constituency. At the Verkhovna Rada (Ukraine's national parliament) of the 9th convocation Faction a Deputy Group member "For the Future". He became the Head's deputy Committee of the Verkhovna Rada of Ukraine on agricultural matters and soil policy at the Verkhovna Rada of the 9th convocation.

Logo of We Have to Live Here, Kolykhaiev's political party

Kolykhaiev was elected mayor of Kherson in the 2020 Ukrainian local elections. A party founded by him called "We Have to Live Here" won 13 of the 54 seats in the Kherson City Council in the same election. On 30 March 2021, Kolykhaiev resigned from the Verkhovna Rada to focus on his role as mayor.

On 24 February 2022, the start of the Russian invasion of Ukraine, Russian forces from Crimea began advancing in the direction of Kherson. Parts of the city were damaged, and Kolykhaiev allowed volunteers to dig mass graves due to heavy civilian casualties. On March 2, Kherson became the first major Ukrainian city to fall. Kolykhaiev reported 10 Russian officers including their commander, came into the city's administration. After some discussion, they came to an agreement on rules the city would have to follow while under Russian occupation. Kolykhaiev pushed for his own demands of the Russian officers during the meeting, which included the Ukrainian flag flying over the administration building, tanks not being allowed into the city, and humanitarian aid / evacuations. He later told The New York Times that the Russian officers had informed him of their plans to set up a military administration. He expressed distaste for the situation. The occupational administration installed a puppet government of Kherson, replacing him with Oleksandr Kobets, on 27 April 2022. On 28 June, Kolykhaiev was abducted by Russian agents. His whereabouts then became unknown.

On 21 September 2022, President of Ukraine Volodymyr Zelenskyy appointed Halyna Luhova as Head of the Kherson City Military Administration. Luhova then started to performs the functions of mayor. On 11 November 2022, Kherson was liberated by the Ukrainian army.

== Captivity ==
After no word since his abduction on 28 June 2022, an update came on 13 September 2023, the Red Cross told Kolykhaiev's son that his father's been added to the Russian list of prisoners and was officially a prisoner of war, and was in Russia. The exactly location of Kolykhaiev and the status of his health was not given by the Russian authorities. On 2 December 2024, it was reported by the Public Interest Journalism Lab that Kolykhaiev was being held in a secret torture facility operated by the Federal Security Service (FSB) in Simferopol, Crimea. The information was sourced from an unnamed man who was recently returned from the prison to Ukraine, where he claimed to have seen Kolykhaiev, additionally stating "the mayor is holding up". Russia, in response, denied both Kolykhaiev's location and the existence of the torture facility.

Conflicting information about Kolykhaiev's location was thereafter spread to his son, Sviatoslav, who stated he had received tips that his father was also located in Chonhar (far south Kherson/Crimea), Taganrog (Russia), and deep Russia/Siberia, all sourced from recently returned prisoners of war who claimed to have seen him there. Sviatoslav was confidently able to say Kolykhaiev was in Taganrog for over a year before being moved to deep inside Russia to possibly a pre-trial detention center in February 2025. From February to June 2025, his location was unknown. The last reports to come about Kolykhaiev claimed he was in a critical state with leg problems preventing him from walking normally, a skin disease, and low moral, to the point where he refused to get up. It was unclear but unlikely Kolykhaiev was receiving medical treatment, as it was reported all prisoners regardless of age or former status were treated the same. Kolykhaiev remained in captivity even after the release of prior-Mayor of Kherson, Volodymyr Mykolaienko, from Russian captivity on 24 August 2025.

== Awards ==
Medal of Merit of Ukraine's Football Federation.
