= Vintov =

Vintov (Russian: Винтов, from винт meaning a screw) is a Russian masculine surname, its feminine counterpart is Vintova. It may refer to

- Maksim Vintov (born 1985), Russian football player
- Roman Vintov (born 1978), Russian football player
