= Tancerev Mykola Olegovich =

Ukrainian athlete

Mykola Tantserev
Personal information
- Nationality: Ukrainian
- Born: 31 July 1997 (age 28) Kherson
- Education: Kherson State University (KSU)

Sport
- Sport: Rowing
- Coached by: Bakarasev Oleksandr
Medal record
Representing Ukraine
Coastal rowing
World championships
Gold medal – first place	Lisbon 2021	M4×+
Gold medal – first place	Lisbon 2021	M4×+

Mykola Tantserev (born 31 July 1997, Kherson) is a Ukrainian athlete, academic rower, two-time world champion.

He was born on 31 July 1997 in the city of Kherson.

== Early years ==
After receiving a basic secondary education, he entered the Kherson Higher School of Physical Culture at the athletics department. Took part in all-Ukrainian competitions and refereeing.

Due to a sports injury, surgery and long rehabilitation, he was forced to leave this sport.

== The beginning of a career in rowing ==
In 2017, he entered Kherson State University at the Faculty of Physical Education and Sports, where he actively participated in the student life of the university and the city.

In the same year, Valentin Vasyliovych Naumenko invited him to attend academic rowing classes as a coxswain.

== Sports achievements ==
In 2018, he won his first championship of Ukraine as part of the swing eight under the leadership of coach Oleksandr Bakarasev.

In 2019, he received the title of Master of Sports of Ukraine.

== Subsequent years ==
In 2021, he won two gold medals at the championship as part of four doubles, in coastal rowing, women's (Oksana Golub, Daryna Verkhoglyad, Olena Buryak, Yevhenia Dovhodko) and men's crews (Maxim Boklazhenko, Dmytro Mikhai, Oleksandr Nadtoka, Ivan Dovhodko) of the world in Lisbon, Portugal.

He became a member of the Olympic team of academic rowing of Ukraine.

In 2021, he entered the Kherson National Technical University, majoring in public administration and administration.

After 24 February 2022, he participated in the resistance against the Russian invasion in Kherson.

In the middle of 2022, he was forced to migrate to the EU for reasons of his own security.

== Sources ==
1. https://worldrowing.com/wp-content/uploads/2020/07/EntryList_Oeiras2021_WRCC_Detail_V1.pdf
2. https://kherson-news.info/society/hersonci-privezli-zoloti-medali-z-chempionaty-svity/
3. https://miskrada.kherson.ua/news/27-vesluvalnykiv-zbirnoi-komandy-oblasti-zavoiuvaly-31-medal-na-chempionati-u-dnipri/
