= VVV-Spetstekhnika =

Dredging factory in Kherson, Ukraine

VVV-Spetstekhnika is a suction dredger factory founded in 2006 in Kherson in southern Ukraine. The factory specializes in making and repairing dredgers. It makes suction dredgers and cutter suction dredgers, of brand HCC. Currently it makes 11 basic models in 64 versions.

== Overview ==
These dredgers' load handling rate varies from 15 meters cubic per hour to 650 cubic meters per hour, and their depth of excavation from 1.5 to 22 meters. The company manufactures the dredgers: free suction dredgers, jet suction dredgers (GR), cutter suction dredgers (F).

The company makes dredgers for the domestic market and for foreign customers. The main customers of the enterprise at the moment are the customers from Belarus, Russia, Nigeria, Ghana, Mali, and others.

Certification

- Certificate of Compliance quality management system ISO 9001: 2008;
- Shipping Register of Ukraine;

Awards

- "Company of the Year", took second place in Ukraine among the companies involved in the construction and repair of ships, 12.26.2012;
- "Industry Leader 2012" -the construction and repair of ships, 28.12.2012
