= Kherson TV Tower =

- Херсонська телевежа
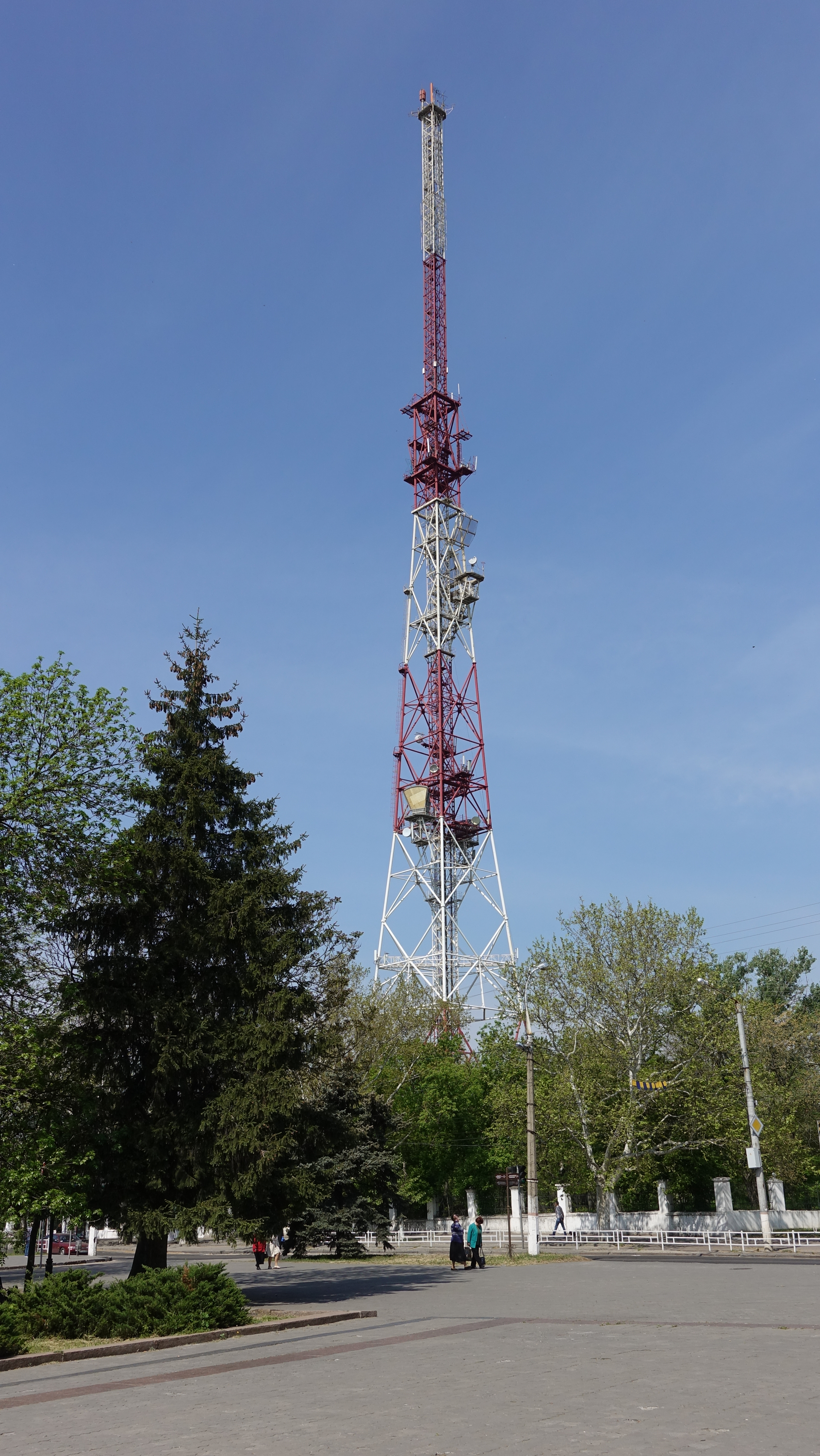

- Location within Ukraine

General information
- Status: Destroyed
- Type: Communications Tower; Telecommunication Tower
- Location: Kherson, Kherson Oblast, Ukraine
- Coordinates: 46.6400°N 32.6266°E
- Construction started: 1991
- Completed: 2005
- Destroyed: 2022

Height
- Antenna spire: 199.00 m (653 ft)
- Roof: 189.89 m (623 ft)

Kherson TV Tower (Ukrainian: Херсонська телевежа) was a 199 m (653 ft) tall steel space framed truss communications tower located in the Ukrainian city of Kherson. The building was uniquely built, having been built by using the cross bracing system. The tower was a truss TV tower, specifically, a Vierendeel truss tower, wherein a structure's members are not triangulated but form rectangular openings instead (see Vierendeel Truss). The tower had an antenna that measured 199.95 m (656 ft) and a roof that measured 189.89 m (623 ft). The tower possessed a total height of 200 m (656 ft), and was the tallest structure in the Kherson Oblast.

During the Russian invasion of Ukraine, the tower was destroyed by retreating Russian forces on 10 November 2022.

== History ==
Although the exact date of the commencing of the tower's construction is unknown, construction of the Kherson TV Tower was begun in 1991 and finished after 14 years, to be exact, in 2005, in the city of Kherson, in Ukraine. During the Russian invasion of Ukraine, the tower was destroyed by retreating Russian forces on 10 November 2022.

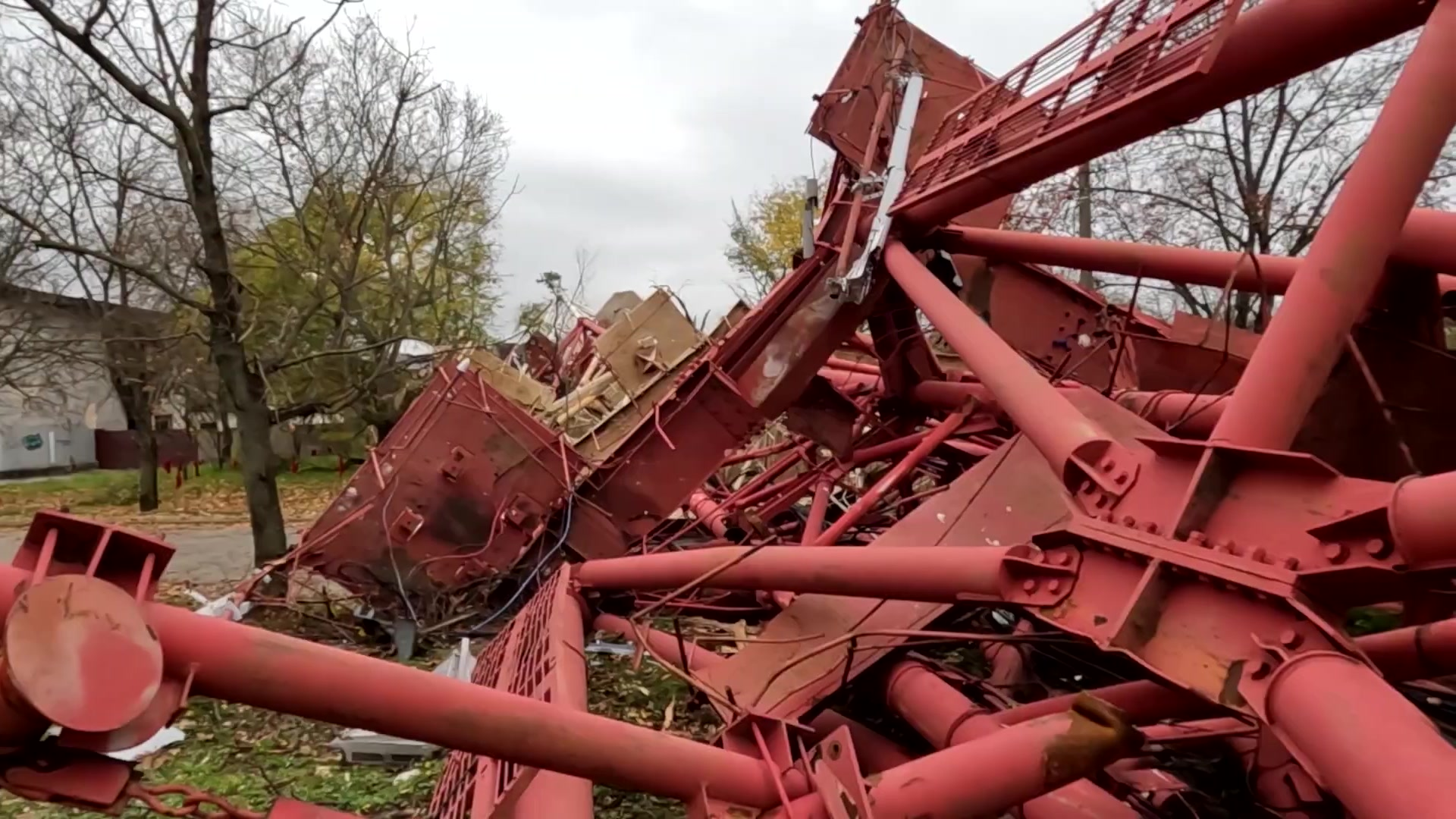
Remains of the tower

== See also ==
- Lattice tower
- List of tallest towers in the world
- Kherson
- Kherson Oblast
- Kyiv TV Tower
