= Kherson Art Museum =

Art museum in Kherson, Ukraine

Coordinates: 46.6298°N 32.6095°E

- Херсонський обласний художній музей імені Олексія Шовкуненка
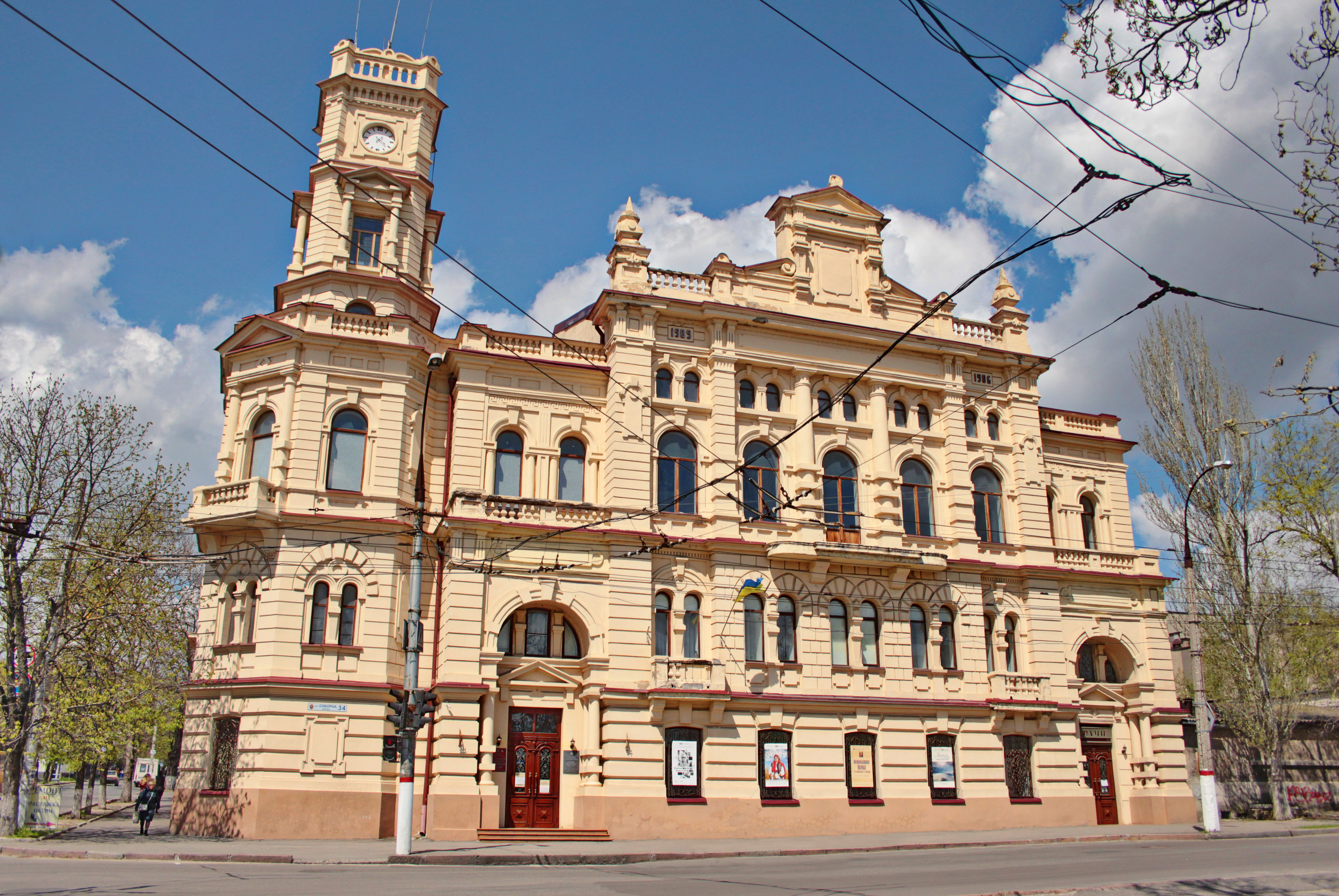
- Established: 27 May 1978
- Location: Kherson, Ukraine
- Type: Art museum
- Website: https://artmuseum.ks.ua

Immovable Monument of Local Significance of Ukraine
- Official name: Міська дума (City hall)
- Type: Architecture
- Reference no.: 230057-Хр

The Kherson Art Museum (also known as the Oleksii Shovkunenko Kherson Regional Art Museum; Ukrainian: Херсонський обласний художній музей імені Олексія Шовкуненка, romanized: Khersonskyi oblasnyi khudozhnii muzei imeni Oleksiia Shovkunenka) is an art museum in Kherson, Ukraine. It is housed in Kherson's former city hall building. The museum opened on 27 May 1978.

During the 2022 Russian invasion of Ukraine, the museum was looted by Russian troops while Kherson was occupied. A short time before the city was liberated by Ukrainian forces, the collection was moved to the Central Museum of Taurida in Simferopol in Russian-occupied Crimea.

== History ==
=== Foundation of the collection ===
Archaeologist and public figure Victor Ivanovich Goshkevich founded an archaeological museum in Kherson in 1890. In 1909, Goshkevych gave the museum as a gift to the city, a gift that comprised both the original Goshkevych museum building and a collection that included numismatic and archaeological finds as well as paintings and icons.

In 1912, on the initiative of local patron Prince Mykola Antonovych Gedroits, a museum of fine arts was opened on the lower floor of the Goshkevych museum building, and the museum expanded its collections with works of painting, sculpture, porcelain, crystal and engraving.

Additions during this period included paintings by Oleksy P. Bogolyubov, I. F. Kolesnikov, Kirill V. Lemokh, Vladimir E.Makovsky, V. D. Polenova, Mykola K. Pymonenko, S. S. Yegornov, and V. I. Zarubin, and works by sculptors I. Ya. Ginzburg and B.W. Edwards.

=== Soviet period ===
In the period of the 20s and 30s following World War I, the collection museum was replenished with works by Russian and Western European masters. On the eve of World War II, the museum's holdings numbered about 700 exhibits. During the years of fascist occupation, the Nazis took most of the museum's valuables, including a collection of works of art, from Kherson to sites in Germany and Romania.

After the liberation of the city in March 1944, attempts were made to repatriate items from the original collection, but it was not until 1966 with the art department was opened.

=== Modern opening and reestablishment ===
In 1976, the city inherited the collection of Leningrad native M.I. Kornilovskaya, which included 500 works of fine art and a unique collection of books. The current Kherson Art Museum was created in 1978 on the basis of the art department of the Museum of Local History and the Leningrad collection. In the first days of creation, a significant number of exhibits from the funds of the Ministries of Culture of the USSR and Ukraine, Unions of Artists of the USSR and Ukraine were transferred to the museum collection. In 1981, O. V. Shovkunenko, the wife of Ukrainian People's Artist of the USSR Oleksii O. Shovkunenko, donated more than 100 works of her husband to the museum.

== Museum building ==
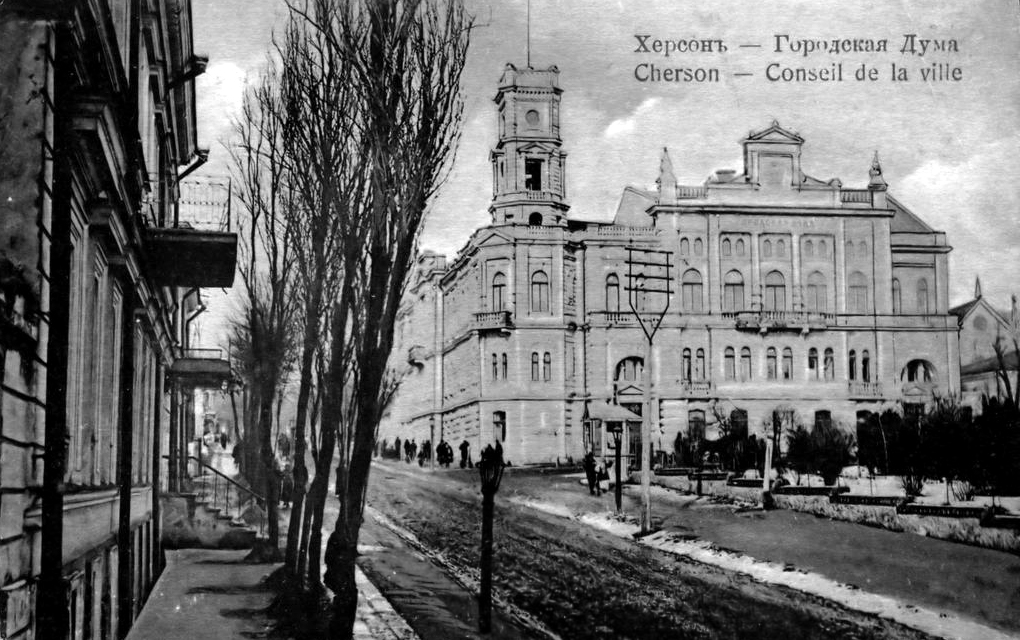
City Duma (Council) of Kherson. (Postcard, bef 1917)

The museum is housed in Kherson's former city hall. Constructed 1905–1906, the building was specifically designed to house the city's administrative offices, including the mayor's office, the city orphans' court and the city public bank. It continues to be both one of the best-known symbols of the city and "a treasury of the city's spiritual heritage."

In 1900, at a meeting of the City Duma (council), Kherson's Mayor I. I. Volokhin raised the issue of constructing a building to centralize the city's offices. Of the four anonymously-submitted proposals presented at the Duma-approved competition, the design by Odessa-born architect Adolf Borisovich Minkus (1870–1948) prevailed. Construction begain May 28, 1905 and was completed in 1906.

The structure intermixes several architectural styles into a unified whole, a "grand Imperial building" with views of the Dnipro.

== Collection ==
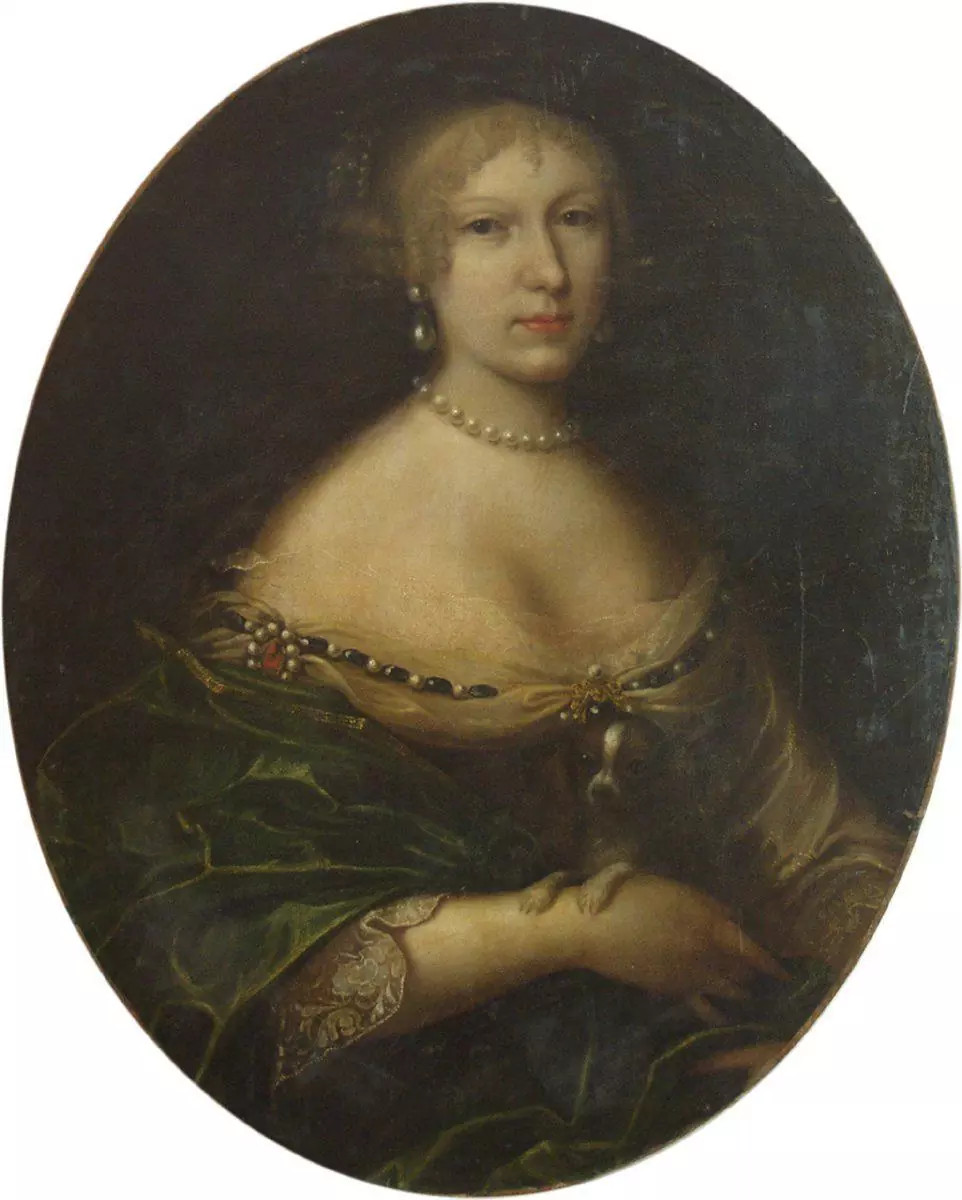
"Lady with a Dog," Peter Lely, 17th c. Kherson Art Museum

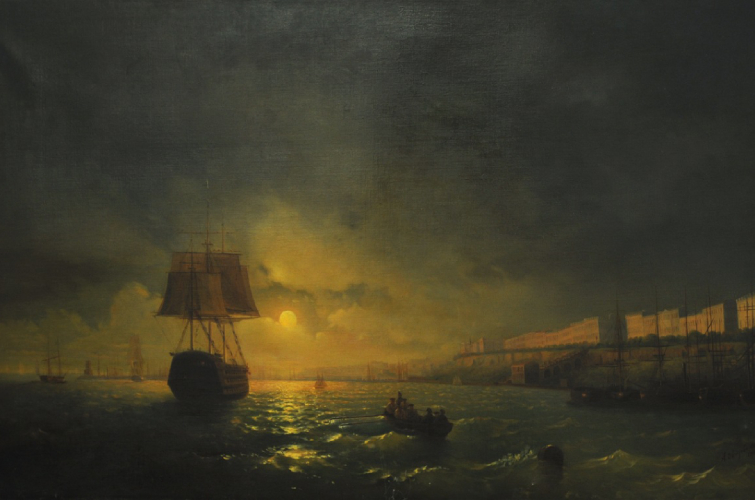
"View of the City of Odesa, 1846," Ivan Aivazovsky (oil on canvas), Kherson Art Museum

As of 2022, the museum's collection included more than 14,000 works of art. The collection included works of Ukrainian and international artists in painting, graphics, sculpture, decorative and applied art, covering 17th century of Russian icon painting through to works by modern Kherson artists. The three main areas of the collection included:

- Icon painting of the 17th – early 20th centuries
- Russian art of the 18th – 1st half of the 19th century
- Ukrainian and Russian art of the second half of the 19th and early 20th centuries.

The best known works in the collection included:

- "Yuri Zmieborets with the holy apostles Peter and Paul" (XVIII – beginning of the XIX century)
- "Mother of God Quell my sorrows" (XIX century)
- "Andrei the First-Called" (XX century)
- "Lady with a Dog," Peter Lely
- "Female portrait", K. E. Makovsky (1883)
- "The storm is coming", Ivan K. Aivazovsky
- "Neapolitan woman", P. Orlov
- "Sunset"), O. K. Savrasov
- "Livestock yard in Abramtsev", V. D. Polenov
- "By the fireplace", I. M. Kramskoi
- "Girl with a clutch"), V. Makovsky
- "Horse with a driver", P. Klodt
- "Prince Svyatoslav", E. O. Lansere
- "Mephistopheles", M. M. Antokolskyi
- "Beside the Prior of the Monastery", August von Bayer (1859).
- "Oaks on the lawn", Oleksii O. Shovkunenko (1956)
- "Molodytsia", Oleksii O. Shovkunenko (1938)
- Still life with a blue jug", Oleksii O. Shovkunenko (1930)

== Current status ==
During the 2022 Russian invasion of Ukraine, the museum was looted by Russian troops while Kherson was occupied. On October 31, 2022, just prior to the city's liberation by Ukrainian forces, Russian trucks began to line up outside the museum. Uniformed Russian soldiers, accompanied by representatives of the Russian Ministry of Culture and Federal Security Service (FSB) officers in civilian clothes "stuffed almost 15,000 works of art carelessly into trucks and buses."

The collection was moved to the Central Museum of Taurida in Simferopol in Russian-occupied Crimea, where Putin enthusiast Simferopol Museum Director Andrei Malgin crowed that the move was made to ensure the safety of the artworks. Numerous works from the Kherson collection have been identified in the pictures from occupied Simferopol, but, as of February 2023, it was not yet known whether the Kherson collection had been kept together in its entirety.

The Kherson police have opened an investigation into what they describe as a "war crime."

The deliberate Russian destruction and looting of more than 500 Ukrainian cultural heritage sites has been characterized by Ukraine's Minister of Culture Oleksandr Tkachenko as cultural genocide.

The building was hit by a russian FPV drone on the morning of August 20, 2026 damaging historic plasterwork and parquet flooring. The strike caused a fire in the museum, and in an outbuilding.

== See also ==
- Ukrainian cultural heritage during the 2022 Russian invasion
