= Kherson =

City in Kherson Oblast, Ukraine

Kherson Херсон
- City
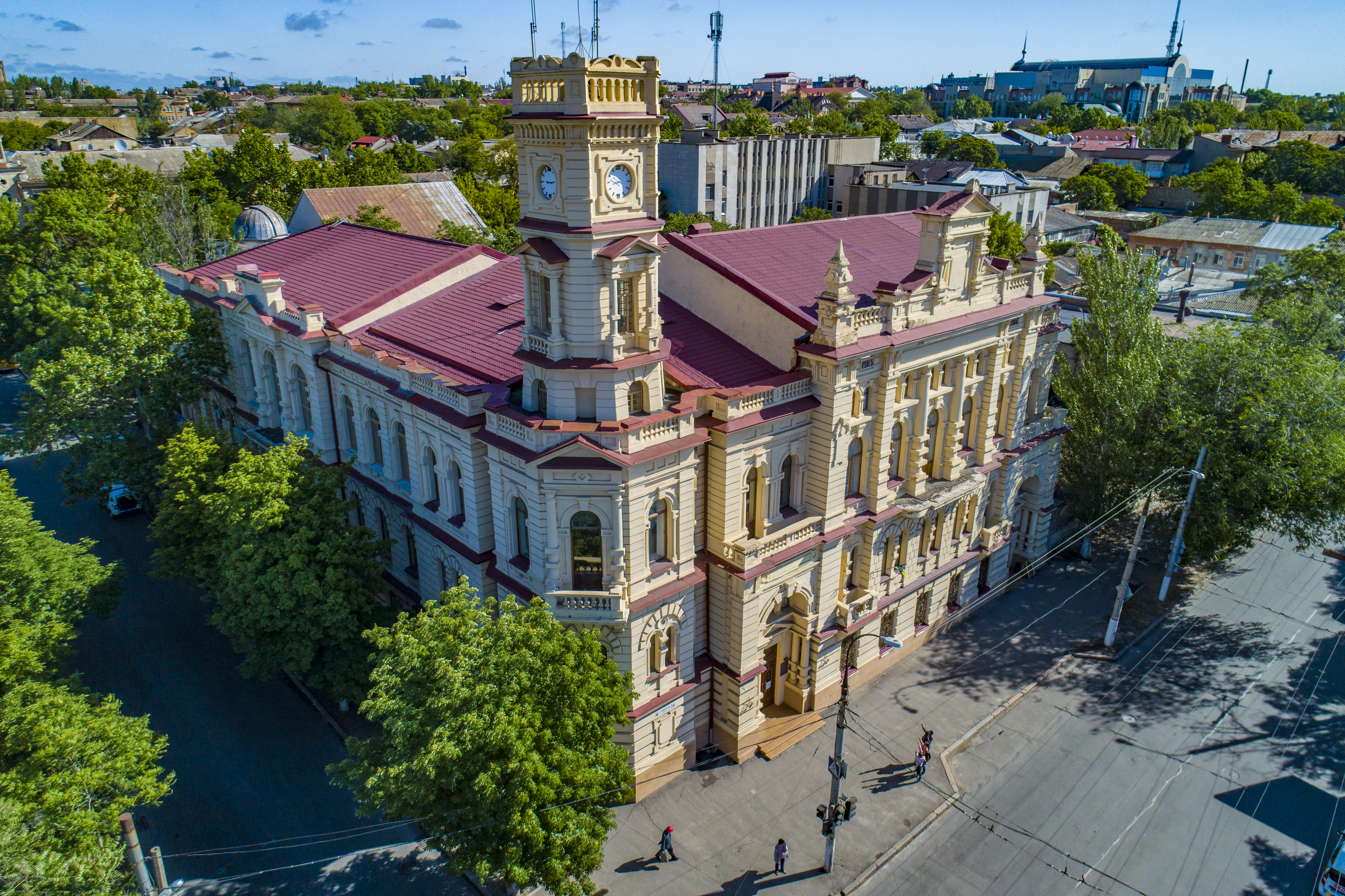
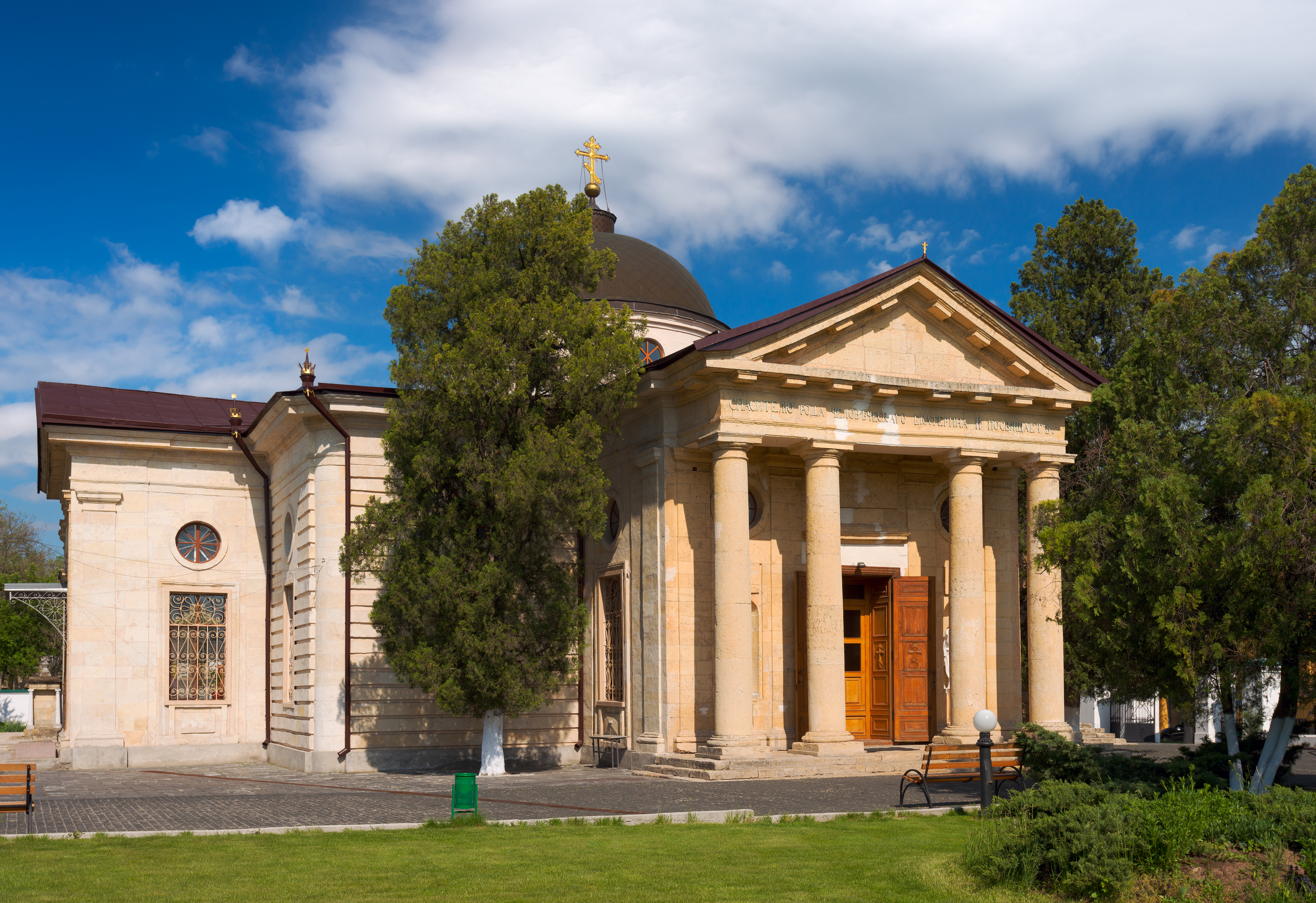
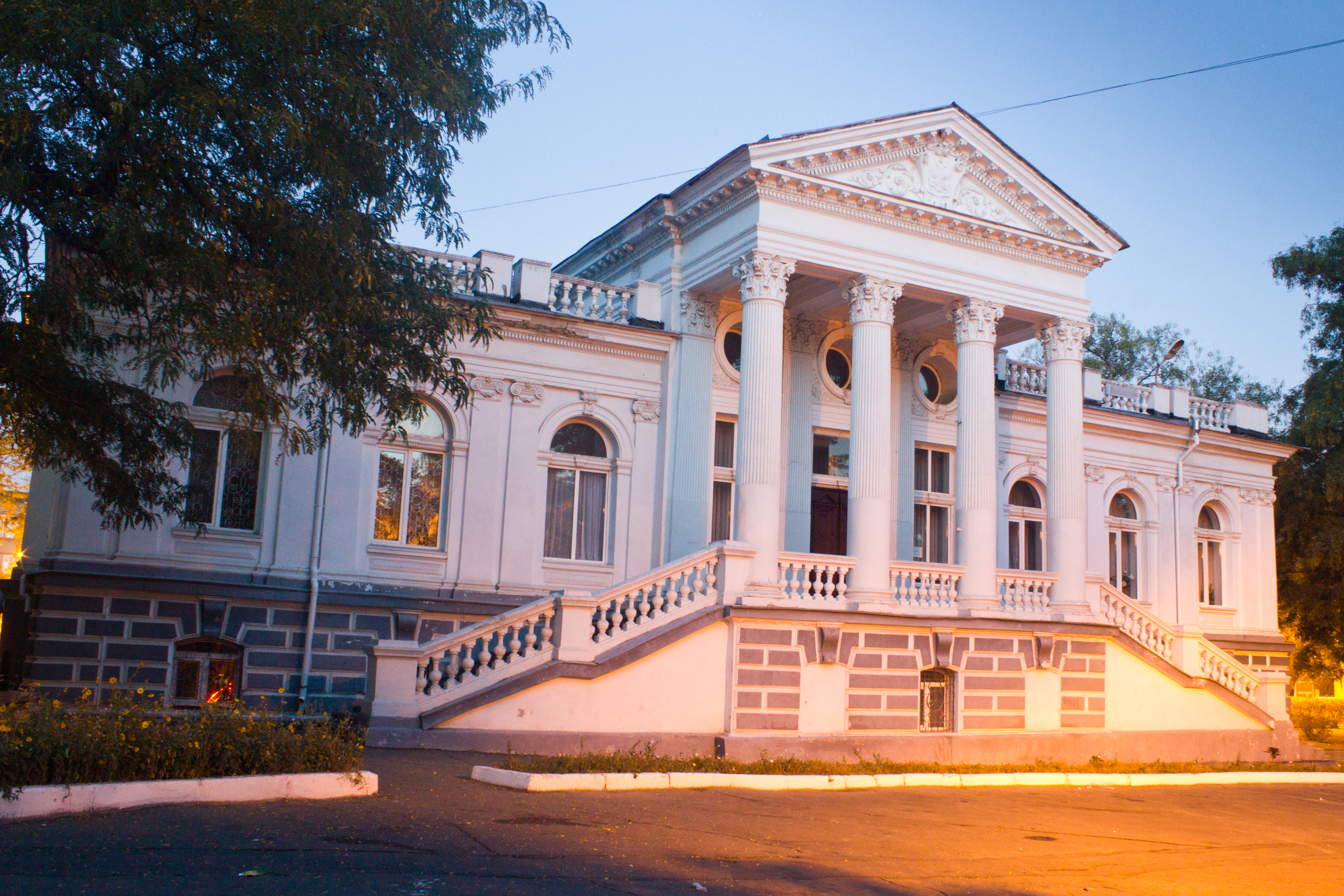
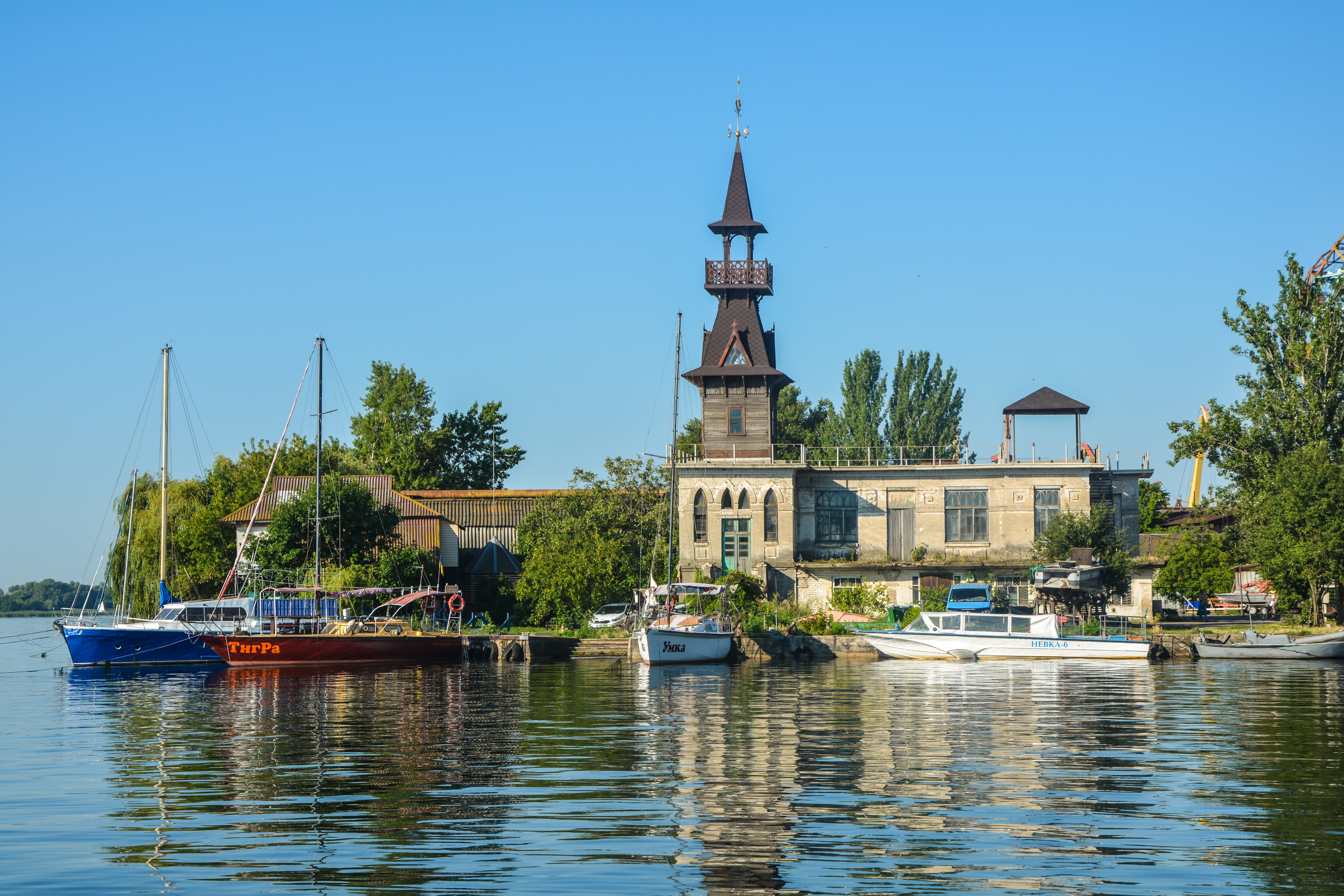
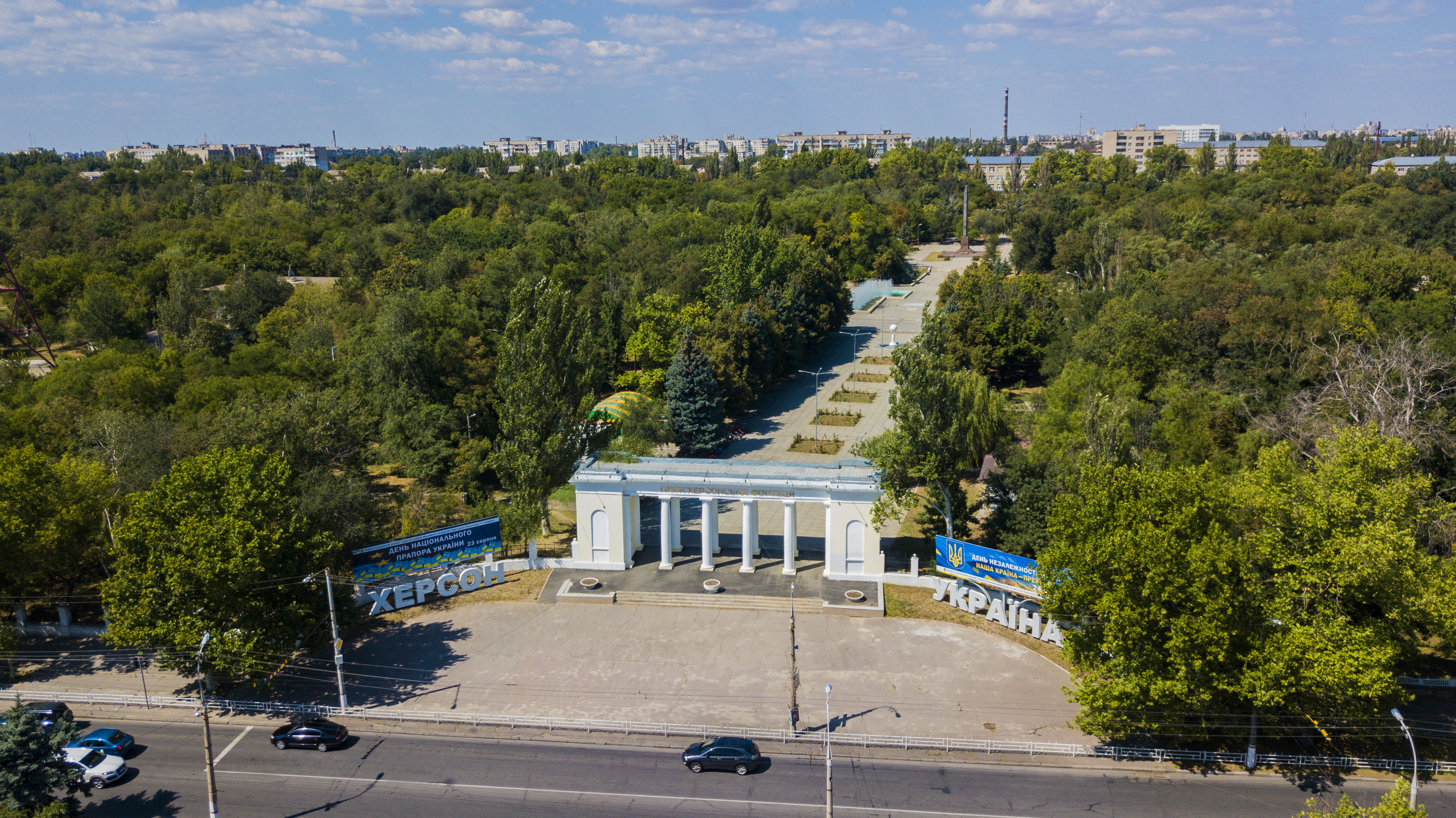
- Kherson Art Museum St. Catherine's Cathedral Kherson Public Library Kherson Yacht Club Shevchenko Park

- Flag Coat of arms
- Interactive map of Kherson
- Location of Kherson Kherson (Ukraine) Kherson (Black Sea)
- Coordinates: 46°38′33″N 32°37′30″E
- Country: Ukraine
- Oblast: Kherson Oblast
- Raion: Kherson Raion
- Hromada: Kherson urban hromada
- Founded: 18 June 1778

Government
  - Head of the city Military Administration: Yaroslav Shanko

Area
  - Total: 135.7 km^{2} (52.4 sq mi)
- Elevation: 46.6 m (153 ft)

Population (2025)
  - Total: 66,000 ▼
  - Density: 490/km^{2} (1,300/sq mi)
- Postal code: 73000
- Area code: +380 552
- Primary airport: Kherson International Airport
- Website: miskrada.kherson.ua

Kherson (Ukrainian and Russian: Херсон, Ukrainian: [xerˈsɔn], Russian: [xʲɪrˈson]) is a port city in southern Ukraine that serves as the administrative centre of Kherson Oblast. Located by the Black Sea and on the Dnieper River, Kherson is the home to a major ship-building industry and is a regional economic centre. At the beginning of 2022, its population was estimated at 279,131.

The city was founded as a base for the Russian Empire's Black Sea Fleet on the site of a fortress previously established by Zaporozhian Cossacks. During the 19th and early 20th century Kherson served as the regional capital of eponymous governorate, becoming a major centre of trade and transport. Under the Soviet rule the city became a major scientific, cultural and industrial centre known for its shipbuilding industry. In modern Ukraine the city is also famous for its watermelons.

From March to November 2022, the city was occupied by Russian forces during their invasion of Ukraine. Ukrainian forces recaptured the city on 11 November 2022. In June 2023, part of the city was flooded following the Russian destruction of the nearby Kakhovka Dam. Since liberation, Kherson has become a target of the human safari Russian terror campaign of deliberate drone targeting of civilians, killing about 200 people as of October 2025 per the UN report.

== Etymology ==
As the first new settlement in the "Greek project" of Empress Catherine and her favourite Grigory Potemkin, it was named after the Heraclea Pontic colony of Chersonesus (Ancient Greek: Χερσόνησος, romanized: Khersónēsos [kʰer.só.nɛː.sos] (Note: From two Greek words: khersos (χέρσος, "dry") and nesos (νῆσος, "land"))) which was located on the Crimean Peninsula, meaning 'peninsular shore'.

== History ==
Historical affiliations

- Crimean Khanate 1648–1774
- Russian Empire 1774–1917
- Beginning of 1917–1921 Revolution
- Russian Provisional Government/Russian Republic Mar–Nov 1917
- Ukrainian PR Nov 1917 – Jan 1918
- Ukrainian PRS Jan–Apr 1918
- Ukrainian People's Republic/Ukrainian State Apr 1918 – Jan 1919
- Southern Russia Intervention Jan–Mar 1919
- (Ukrainian Soviet Socialist Republic) Ukrainian SSR Mar–May 1919
- Borotbists May–Jul 1919
- (Ukrainian Soviet Socialist Republic) Ukrainian SSR Jul 1919
- ARSR Jul 1919 – Apr 1920
- (Ukrainian Soviet Socialist Republic) Ukrainian SSR Apr 1920 – Dec 1922
- End of 1917–1921 Revolution
- Soviet Union 1922–1941
- Nazi Germany 1941–1944 (occupation)
- Soviet Union 1944–1991
- Ukraine 1991–2022
- Russia Sep–Nov 2022 (occupation)
- Ukraine 2022–present

=== Predecessor settlements and the founding of Kherson ===
Kherson was preceded by the town of Bilechowisce, first marked on a map by Guillaume Le Vasseur de Beauplan from 1648. Bilchowisce was listed as one of the three chief towns of Yedisan in a 1701 book by English cartographer Herman Moll. A French-language map of the site in 1769 (inset) shows a Russian-built fort or sconce named St. Alexandre. This had been built in 1737 during the Russo-Turkish War and served the Zaporizhian Sich as an administrative center, run by local Cossacks.

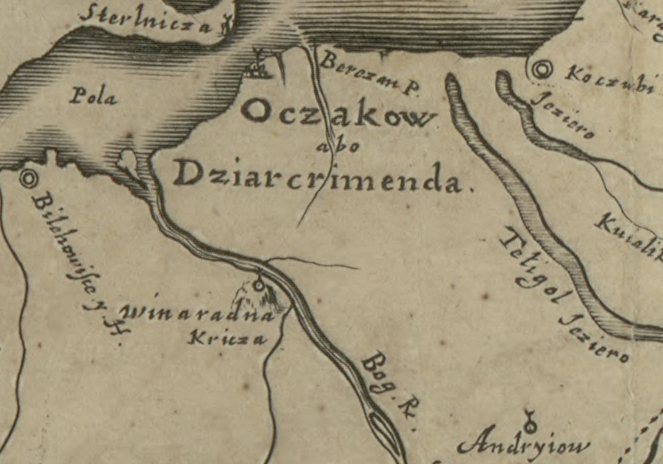
1648 map showing the settlement of Bilechowisce

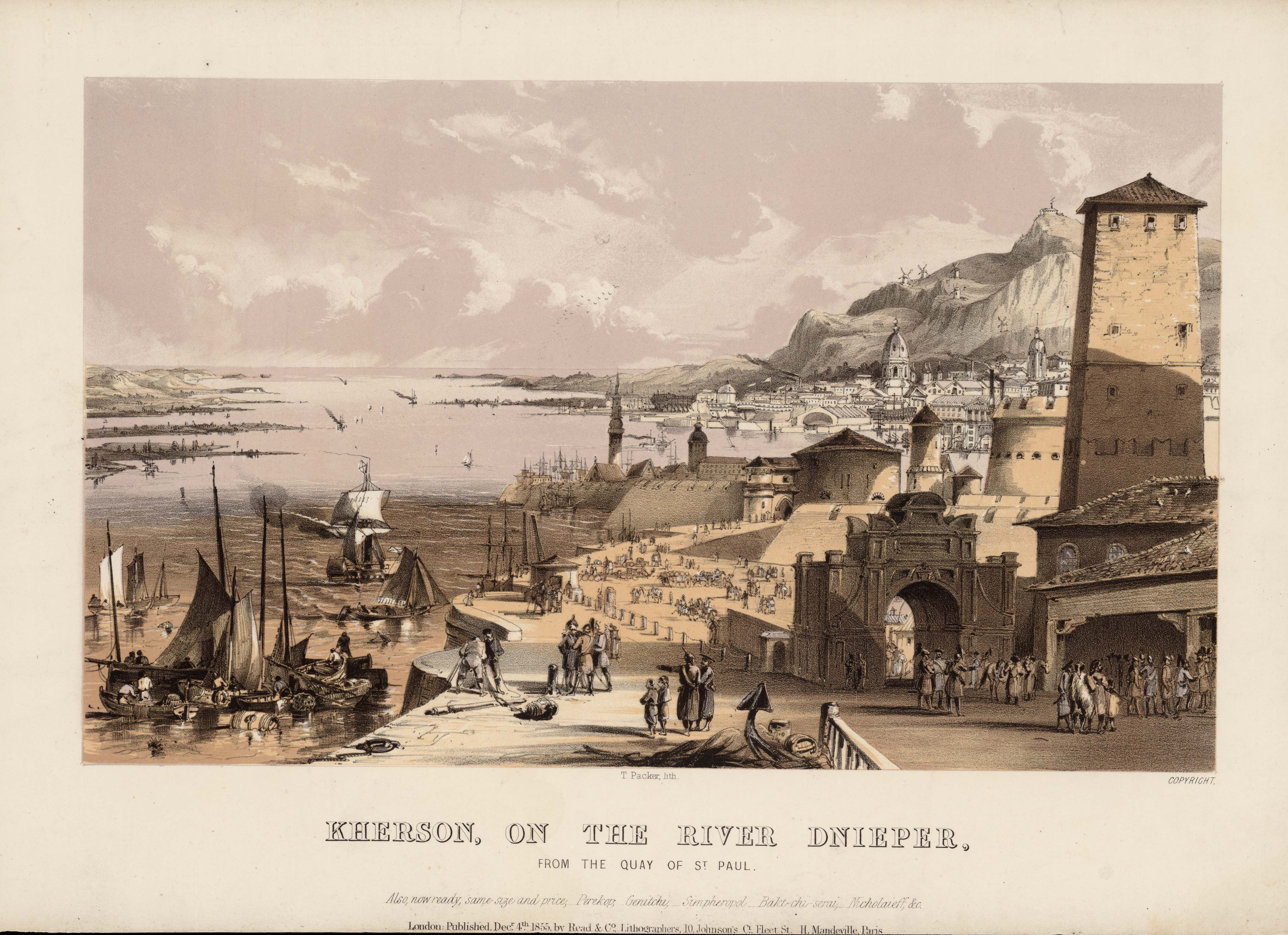
Kherson in 1855

The Russian Empire annexed the territory from the Crimean Khanate in 1774, and a decree of Catherine the Great on 18 June 1778 founded Kherson on the high bank of the Dnieper as a central fortress of the Black Sea Fleet.

1783 saw the city granted the rights of a district town and the opening of a local shipyard where the hulls of the Russian Black Sea fleet were laid. Within a year the Kherson Shipping Company began operations. By the end of the 18th century, the port had established trade with France, Italy, Spain and other European countries. Between 1783 and 1793 Poland's maritime trade via the Black Sea was conducted through Kherson by the Kompania Handlowa Polska. The Poles leased a piece of the shoreline and built houses, exchange offices, workshops and warehouses. There was substantial immigration of Poles and a Polish consulate was established in 1783. In 1791, Potemkin was buried in the newly built St. Catherine's Cathedral. In 1803 the city became the capital of the Kherson Governorate.

Industry, beginning with breweries, tanneries and other food and agricultural processing, developed from the 1850s. According to the Geographical Dictionary of the Kingdom of Poland and other Slavic Countries from 1880, the city was mostly inhabited by Ukrainians, Greeks and Jews. According to the 1897 census, the population of the city was 59,076 of which, on the basis of their first language, 47.2% were recorded as Russian, 29.1% as Jewish, 19.6% Ukrainian, 1.7% Polish. During the revolution of 1905 there were workers' strikes and an army mutiny (an armed demonstration by soldiers of the 10th Disciplinary Battalion) in the city.

=== Early Ukrainian and Soviet rule ===
In the Russian Constituent Assembly election held in November 1917—the first and last free election in Kherson for 70 years—Bolsheviks who had seized power in Petrograd and Moscow received just 13.2 percent of the vote in the Governorate. The largest electoral bloc in the district, with 43 percent of the vote, was an alliance of Ukrainian Socialist Revolutionaries (SRs), Russian Socialist Revolutionaries and the United Jewish Socialist Workers Party.

The Bolsheviks dissolved the SR-dominated Constituent Assembly after its first sitting and, in December 1917, having declared the Ukrainian Soviet Republic, forced from Kyiv the Central Council of Ukraine (Tsentralna Rada) whose response to the Leninist coup had been to proclaim the Ukrainian People's Republic (UPR). But, before the Bolsheviks could secure Kherson, they were obliged to cede the region under the terms of the March 1918 Treaty of Brest-Litovsk to the German and Austrian controlled Ukrainian State. When German and Austrian forces withdrew in November 1918, the efforts of the Petluirites to assert authority of the UPR were frustrated by a French-led Allied intervention which occupied Kherson in January 1919.

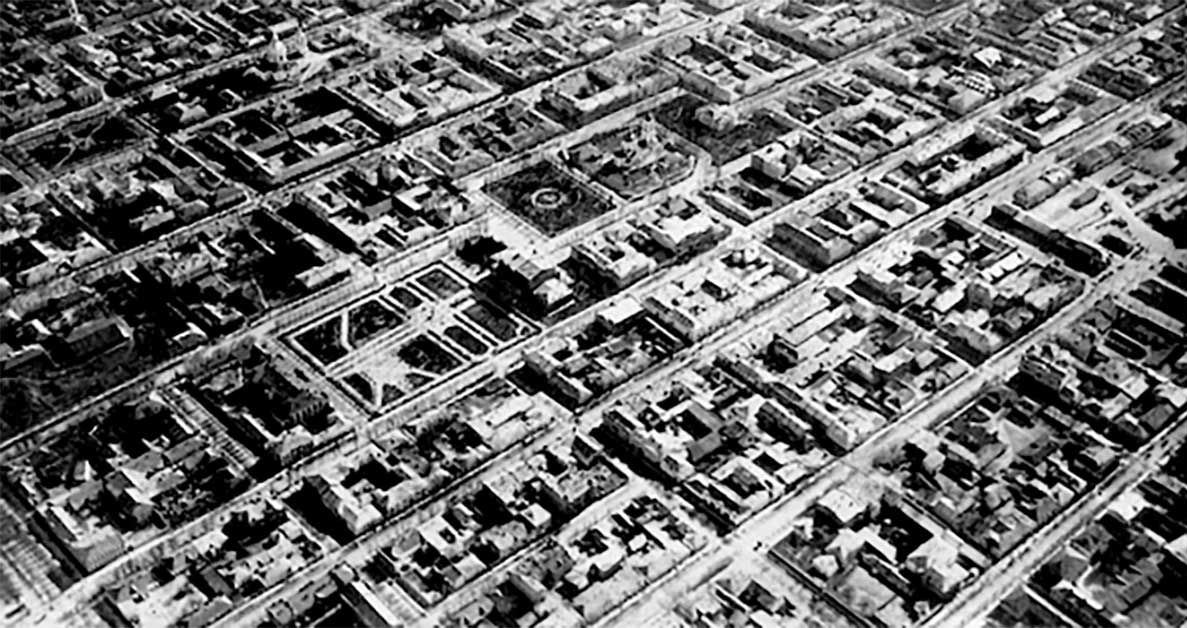
An aerial view of the city in 1918

In March 1919, the Green Army of local warlord Otaman Nykyfor Hryhoriv ousted the French and Greek garrison and precipitated the Allied evacuation from Odesa. In July, the Bolsheviks defeated Hryhoriv who had called upon the Ukrainian people to rise against the "Communist impostors" and their "Jewish commissars", and had perpetrated pogroms, including in the Kherson region. Kherson itself was occupied by the counter-revolutionary Whites before finally falling to the Bolshevik Red Army in February 1920. Afterwards it was administratively part of the Mykolaiv Governorate of Ukraine. On 30 December 1922, as part of what was now the constituent Ukrainian Soviet Socialist Republic, the city and region were incorporated within the newly-declared Soviet Union.

The population was radically reduced from 75,000 to 41,000 by the famine of 1921–1923, but then rose steadily, reaching 97,200 in 1939.

=== World War II ===
In 1940, the city was one of the sites of executions of Polish officers and intelligentsia committed by the Soviets as part of the Katyn massacre.

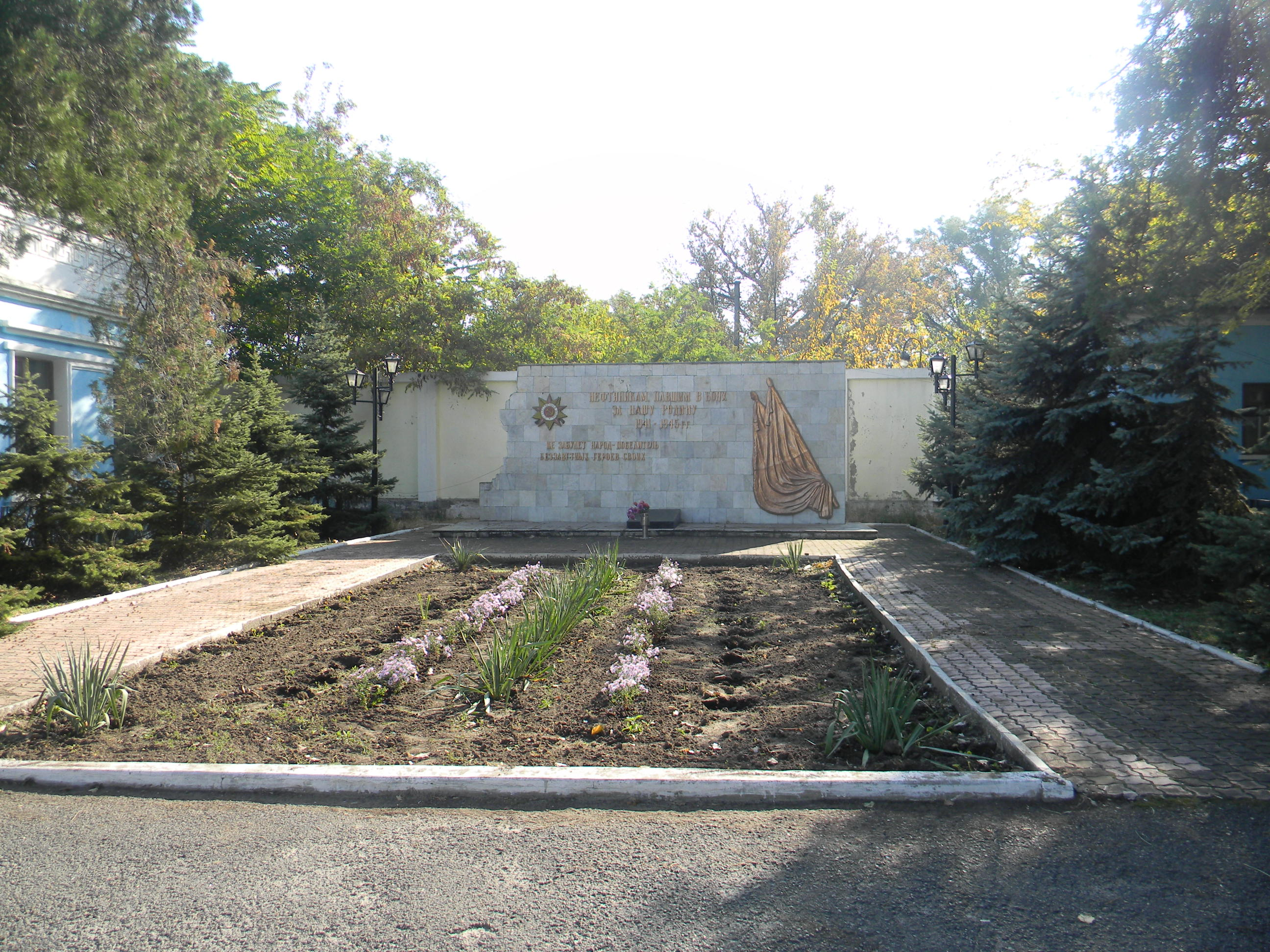
Memorial to local victims of World War II

Further devastation and population loss resulted from the German occupation during the Second World War. The German occupation, which lasted from August 1941 to March 1944, contended with both Soviet and Ukrainian nationalist (OUN) underground cells. The Kherson district leadership of the OUN was headed by Bohdan Bandera (brother of OUN leader Stepan Bandera).

In September 1941, the Germans executed the city's remaining Jewish population, several thousand men, women and children, in anti-tank ditches near the village of Zelenivka. Later, they used the place to bury Soviet soldiers from a prisoner-of-war camp in the city (Stalag 370).

=== Post-war period ===
In the post-war decades, which saw substantial industrial growth, the population more than doubled, reaching 261,000 by 1970. The new factories, including the Comintern Shipbuilding and Repairs Complex, the Kuibyshev Ship Repair Complex, and the Kherson Cotton Textile Manufacturing Complex (one of the largest textile plants in the Soviet Union), and Kherson's growing grain-exporting port, drew in labour from the Ukrainian countryside. This changed the city's ethnic composition, increasing the Ukrainian share from 36% in 1926 to 63% in 1959, while reducing the Russian share from 36 to 29%. The Jewish population never recovered from the Holocaust visited by the Germans: accounting for 26% of residents in 1926, their number had fallen to just 6% in 1959.

=== In independent Ukraine ===
With a turnout of 83.4% of eligible voters, 90.1% of the votes cast in Kherson Oblast affirmed Ukrainian independence in the national referendum of 1 December 1991. With the collapse of the Soviet Union, Kherson and its industries experienced severe dislocation. Over the following three decades, the population of both the city and the region declined, reflecting both a significant excess of deaths over live births and persistent net-emigration from the area.

The 2014 pro-Russian unrest in eastern and southern Ukraine was marked in Kherson by a small demonstration of some 400 persons. Following the Russian occupation of Crimea in 2014, Kherson housed the office of the Ukrainian President's representative in Crimea.

In July 2020, as part of the general administrative reform of Ukraine, the Kherson Municipality was merged as Kherson urban hromada into newly established Kherson Raion, one of five raions in the Kherson Oblast of which the city remained the administrative centre.

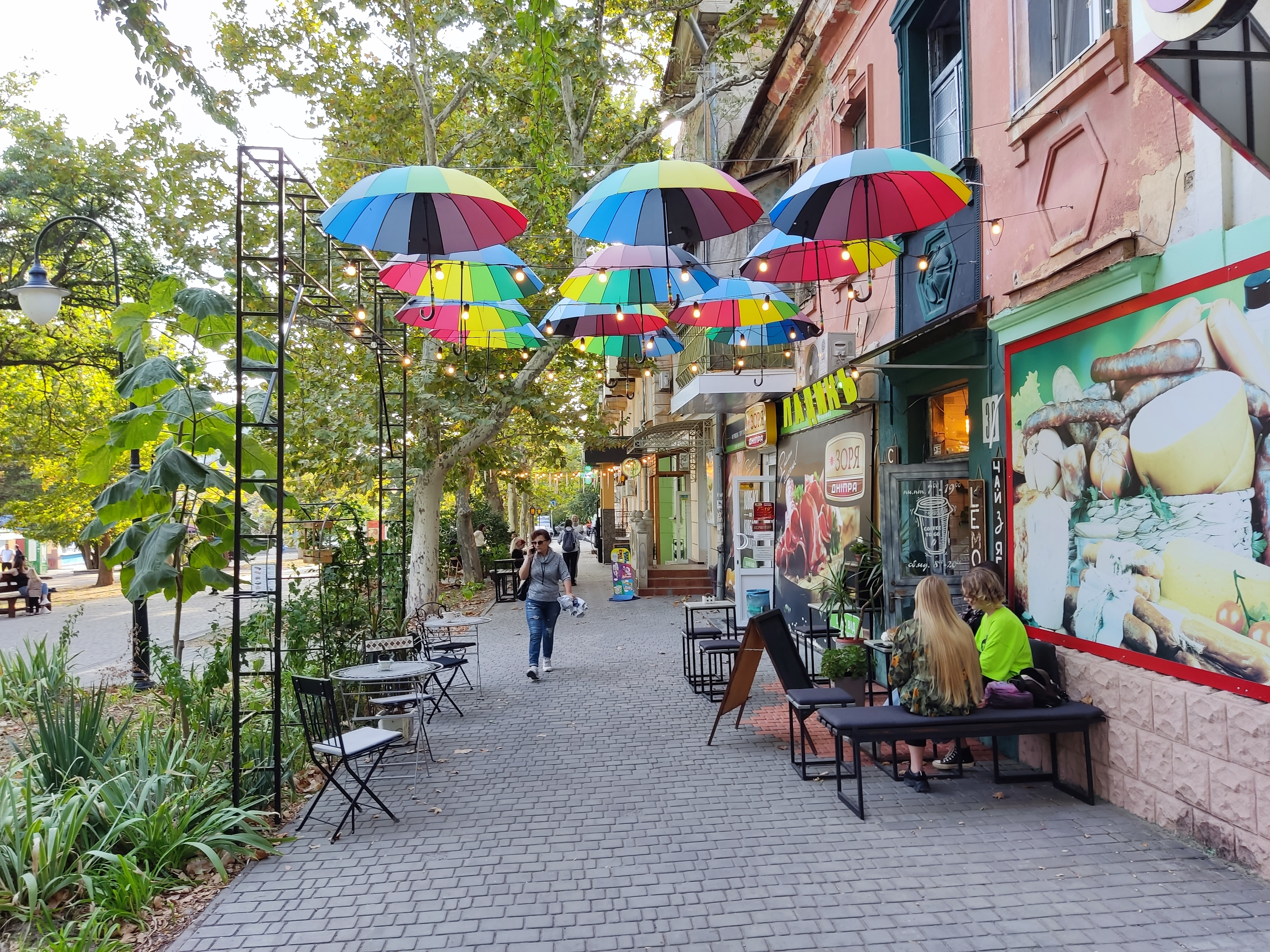
Kherson in 2021

A "City Profile", part of the SCORE (Social Cohesion and Reconciliation) Ukraine 2021 project funded by USAID, the United Nations Development Programme (UNDP), and the European Union, concluded that "more than 80% of citizens in Kherson city feel their locality is a good place to live, work, and raise a family". This was despite a low level of trust in the local authorities in whom corruption was perceived to be high. It also found that, while more inclined to express support for co-operation with Russia than for membership of the EU, "citizens in Kherson feel attached to their Ukrainian identity".

==== 2020 local election ====
In the last free elections before the 2022 Russian invasion, the Ukrainian local elections held on 25 October 2020, the results of Kherson City Council elections were as follows:

Kherson City Council election, 2020
Party	Percentage of vote	Seats
We Have to Live Here!	23.1%	17 seats
Opposition Platform – For Life	14.5%	11 seats
Servant of the People	13.0%	10 seats
Volodymyr Saldo Bloc	11.8%	9 seats
European Solidarity	8.6%	

The parties widely perceived as pro-Russian, and Euro-skeptic, Opposition Platform, Volodymyr Saldo Bloc, and Party of Shariy (3.9%) had a combined vote of just over 30% of the total, and secured 20 out of the 54 seats on the city council. In the wake of the invasion, the Opposition Platform and the Party of Shariy were banned by the National Security Council for alleged ties to the Kremlin.

The Volodymyr Saldo Bloc dissolved; its deputies in Kyiv joined the newly formed faction "Support to the programs of the President of Ukraine". From 26 April 2022, Volodymyr Saldo himself, who had been mayor of Kherson from 2002 to 2012, went on to serve the Russian occupiers, as head of the Kherson military–civilian administration.

=== Russian invasion from February 2022 ===
Kherson witnessed heavy fighting in the first days of the 2022 Russian invasion of Ukraine (Kherson offensive). As of 2 March the city was under Russian control, and as early as 8 March the Russian FSB was reported to be tasked with crushing resistance.

Under the Russian occupation, locals continued to stage street protests against the invading army's presence and in support of the unity of Ukraine. According to the Ukrainian government, the Russian military sought to create a puppet Kherson People's Republic in the style of the Russian-backed separatist polities in the Donbas region and tried to coerce local councillors into endorsing the move, detaining those activists and officials who opposed their design.

By 26 April 2022, Russian troops had taken over the city's administration headquarters and had appointed both a new mayor, former KGB agent Alexander Kobets, and ex-mayor Volodymyr Saldo as a new civilian-military regional administrator. The next day, Ukraine's Prosecutor General said that troops used tear gas and stun grenades to disperse a further pro-Ukraine rally in the city centre. In an indication of an intended split from Ukraine, on the 28th the new administration announced that from May it would switch the region's payments to the Russian ruble. Citing unnamed reports about alleged discrimination against Russian speakers, its deputy head, Kirill Stremousov, said that "reintegrating the Kherson region back into a Nazi Ukraine is out of the question".

On 30 September 2022, the Russian Federation claimed to have annexed Kherson Oblast. The United Nations General Assembly condemned the proclaimed annexations with a vote of 143–5.

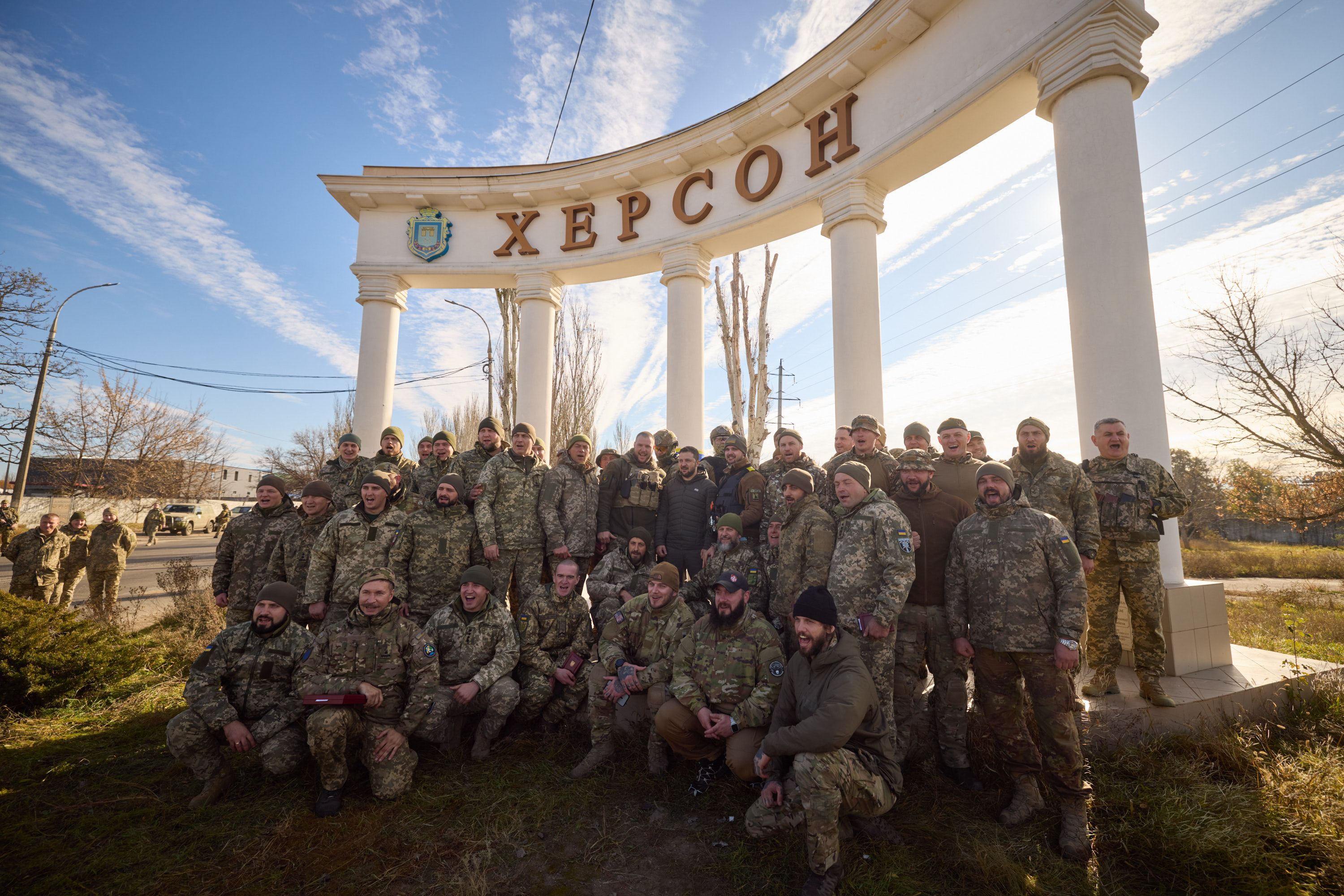
Ukrainian President Volodymyr Zelenskyy with soldiers who distinguished themselves during the liberation of Kherson

Russian forces were ordered to withdraw from the city by defence minister Sergei Shoigu and regroup on the eastern side of the Dnieper on 9 November 2022. Ukrainian officials claimed that Russian troops were destroying bridges connecting the city to the other bank of the river. On 11 November, Ukraine announced that its forces had entered the city following the Russian withdrawal.

Before retreating, the Russian army destroyed infrastructure facilities of the city (communications, water, heat, electricity, TV tower), looted two main museums (Local History Museum and the Art Museum), transporting their items to Crimean museums, and took away several monuments to historical figures.

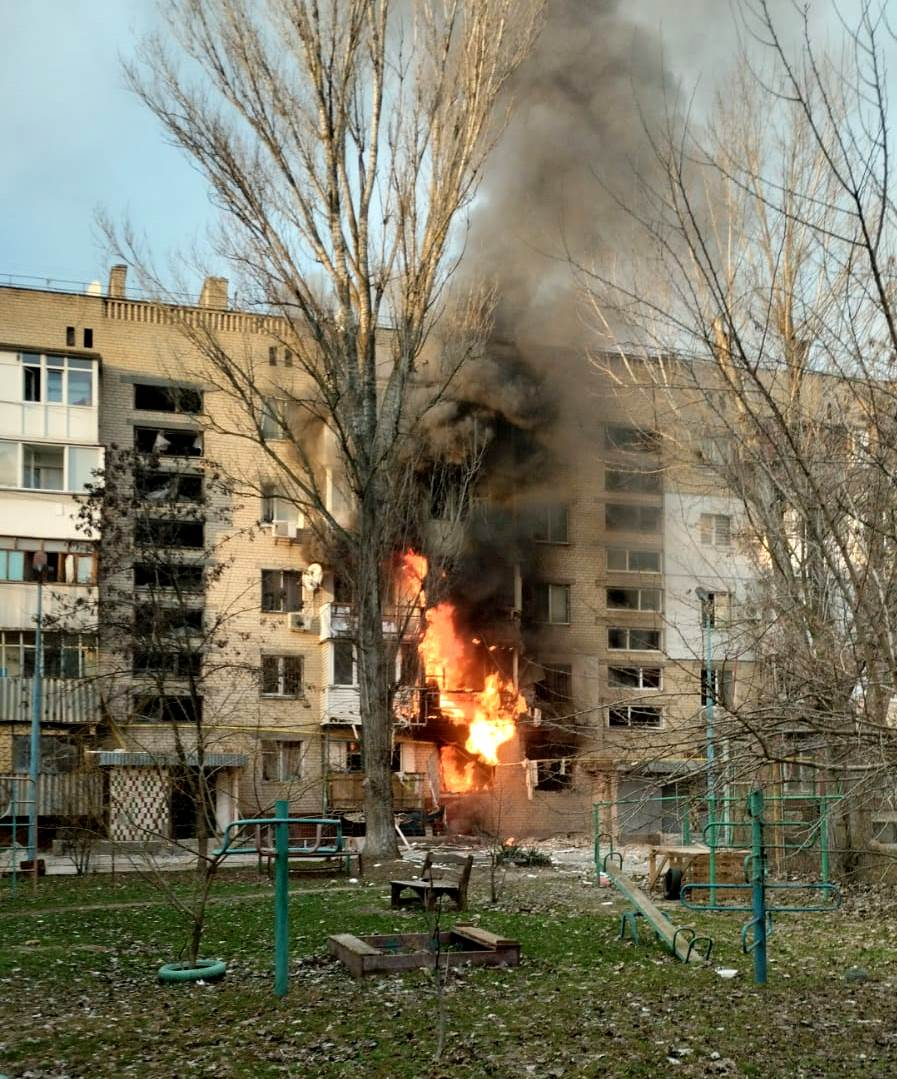
Kherson after shelling by the Russian army on 15 January 2023

In June 2023, the city was flooded following the Russian destruction of the nearby Kakhovka Dam.

On 23 October 2023, online voting concluded on the renaming of numerous streets and localities in Kherson for purposes of decolonization and derussification. This was in accordance with Law of Ukraine "On Condemnation and Prohibition of Propaganda of Russian Imperial Policy in Ukraine and Decolonization of Toponymy", giving local councils six months to remove problematic toponymy.

With Russian forces entrenched just across the Dnipro River, the city remains subject to frequent shelling, and since May 2024, to small drone attacks that target civilians in a terror campaign that has become known as the ″human safari″. Drones, according to American freelance journalist Zarina Zabrisky many of them funded by Russian civilians, hit targets such as people at bus stops, commuters and children playing in parks, with footage of the attacks being shared and celebrated on Russian social media. According to the Kherson City Council Executive Committee, between 1 May and 16 December 2024, drone attacks in Kherson killed at least 30 civilians and injured another 483. In March 2025, the regional governor, Oleksandr Prokudin, was reporting between 600 and 700 drone attacks a week in the city.

In these conditions, the city's pre-war population of 280,000 has shrunk to just 60,000.

== Demographics ==
Historical population

Year	Pop.	±% p.a.
1799	2,000	—
1846	23,650	+5.40%
1859	43,900	+4.87%
1897	59,076	+0.78%
1913	81,000	+1.99%
1920	74,500	−1.19%
1923	41,300	−17.85%
1926	57,376	+11.58%

Year	Pop.	±% p.a.
1939	96,987	+4.12%
1959	157,995	+2.47%
1970	260,687	+4.66%
1979	318,908	+2.27%
1989	355,379	+1.09%
2001	328,360	−0.66%
2011	302,528	−0.82%
2021	279,131	−0.80%

=== Ethnicity ===
According to the Ukrainian National Census in 2001, Kherson had a majority population of Ukrainians (76.5%), with a large minority of Russians (19.9%) and 3.6% others. The exact ethnic composition was as follows:

Ethnic groups in Kherson
	percent
Ukrainians	76.51%
Russians	19.93%
Belarusians	0.80%
Ashkenazi Jews	0.41%
Armenians	0.34%
Moldovans	0.19%
Tatars	0.15%
Poles	0.14%
Bulgarians	0.11%
Romani	0.09%
others	1.33%

=== Languages ===
Languages	1897	2001
Ukrainian	19.6%	53.4%
Russian	47.2%	45.3%
Yiddish	29.1%	
Polish	1.7%	
German	0.7%	

== Administrative divisions ==
There are three urban districts:

- Tsentralnyi District, meaning the Central District, is the central and oldest district of the city. Includes departments: Tavriiskyi, Pіvnichnyi and Mlyny. It was known as Suvorovskyi District until October 2023, when it was renamed in compliance with nationwide laws on derussification of toponymy. The old name was derived from that of the Tsarist Russian military leader Alexander Suvorov.
- Dniprovskyi District, named for the Dnieper river. Includes departments: Antonivka, Molodizhne, Zelenivka, Petrivka, Bohdanivka, Soniachne, Naddniprianske, Inzhenerne.
- Korabelnyi District, which includes the following departments: Shumenskyi, Korabel, Zabalka, Sukharne, Zhytloselyshche, Selyshche-4, Selyshche-5.

== Geography ==
=== Climate ===
Under the Köppen climate classification, Kherson has a humid continental climate (Dfa).

Climate data for Kherson (1991–2020, extremes 1955–present)
Month	Jan	Feb	Mar	Apr	May	Jun	Jul	Aug	Sep	Oct	Nov	Dec	Year
Record high °C (°F)	15.2 (59.4)	18.6 (65.5)	24.9 (76.8)	32.0 (89.6)	37.7 (99.9)	39.5 (103.1)	40.5 (104.9)	40.7 (105.3)	36.4 (97.5)	32.0 (89.6)	21.8 (71.2)	17.2 (63.0)	40.7 (105.3)
Mean daily maximum °C (°F)	1.4 (34.5)	3.1 (37.6)	8.8 (47.8)	16.5 (61.7)	22.9 (73.2)	27.5 (81.5)	30.3 (86.5)	30.1 (86.2)	23.7 (74.7)	16.1 (61.0)	8.4 (47.1)	3.3 (37.9)	16.0 (60.8)
Daily mean °C (°F)	−1.6 (29.1)	−0.6 (30.9)	4.1 (39.4)	10.6 (51.1)	16.7 (62.1)	21.2 (70.2)	23.8 (74.8)	23.3 (73.9)	17.5 (63.5)	10.9 (51.6)	4.7 (40.5)	0.4 (32.7)	10.9 (51.6)
Mean daily minimum °C (°F)	−4.4 (24.1)	−3.8 (25.2)	0.0 (32.0)	5.0 (41.0)	10.6 (51.1)	15.3 (59.5)	17.5 (63.5)	16.7 (62.1)	11.8 (53.2)	6.3 (43.3)	1.6 (34.9)	−2.2 (28.0)	6.2 (43.2)
Record low °C (°F)	−26.3 (−15.3)	−24.4 (−11.9)	−20.2 (−4.4)	−7.9 (17.8)	−1.5 (29.3)	5.5 (41.9)	9.2 (48.6)	6.6 (43.9)	−5.0 (23.0)	−7.6 (18.3)	−16.2 (2.8)	−22.2 (−8.0)	−26.3 (−15.3)
Average precipitation mm (inches)	33 (1.3)	28 (1.1)	30 (1.2)	32 (1.3)	43 (1.7)	59 (2.3)	44 (1.7)	29 (1.1)	38 (1.5)	36 (1.4)	34 (1.3)	38 (1.5)	444 (17.5)
Average extreme snow depth cm (inches)	2 (0.8)	3 (1.2)	1 (0.4)	0 (0)	0 (0)	0 (0)	0 (0)	0 (0)	0 (0)	0 (0)	0 (0)	1 (0.4)	3 (1.2)
Average rainy days	9	7	9	12	11	11	9	6	9	9	12	10	114
Average snowy days	11	10	6	0	0	0	0	0	0	0.3	4	8	39
Average relative humidity (%)	86.5	82.6	75.9	66.7	65.2	63.6	60.1	57.8	65.8	76.2	84.8	87.1	72.7
Mean monthly sunshine hours	66	89	142	215	275	301	333	307	233	152	76	49	2,238
Source 1: Pogoda.ru.net
Source 2: NOAA (humidity and sun 1991–2020)

== Transport ==
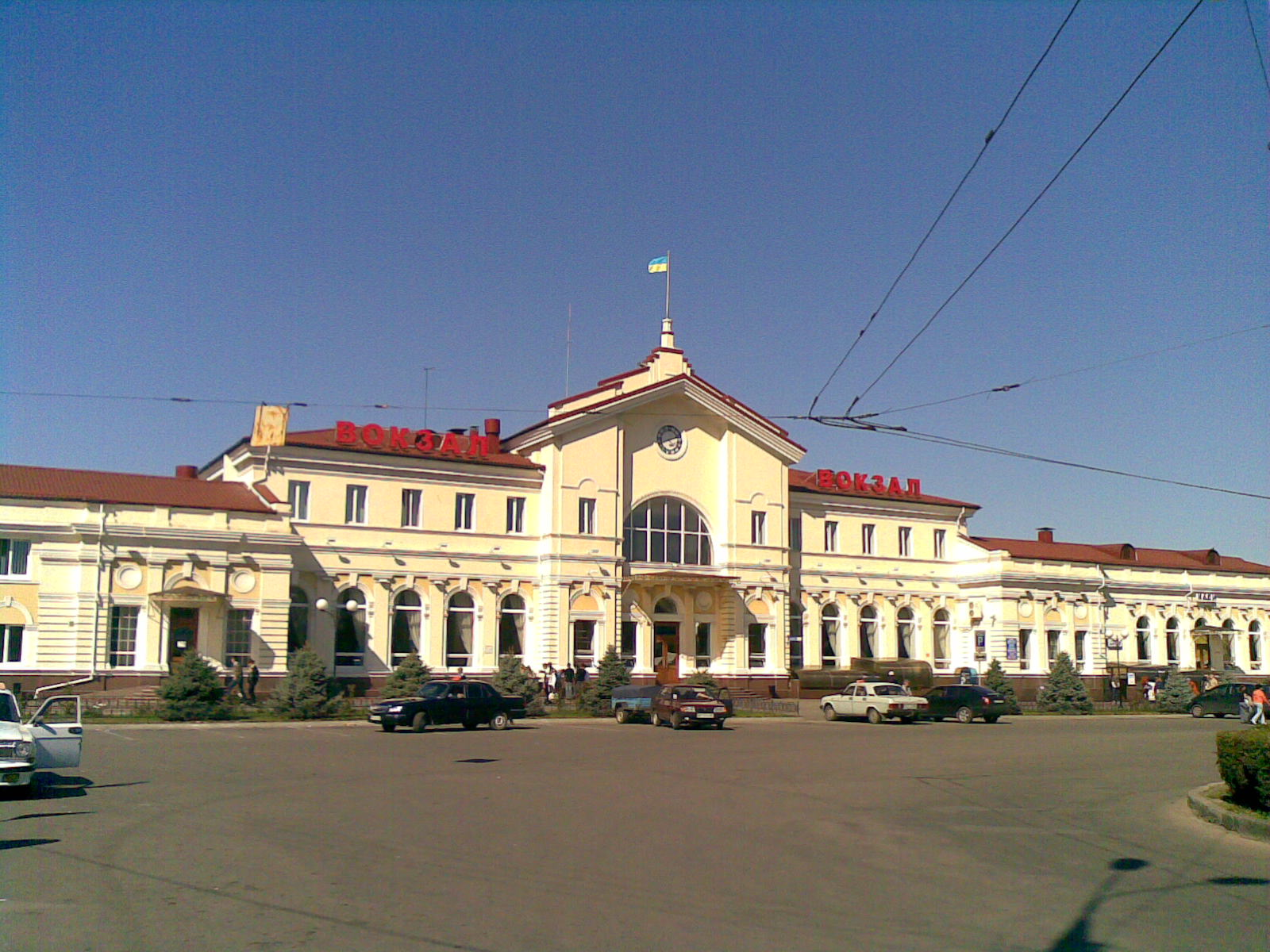
Kherson railway station

Kherson has a seaport on the Dnieper river – the Port of Kherson – and a port on the Koshevaya or Koshova river – the Kherson River Port.

Kherson is connected to the national railroad network of Ukraine. There are daily long-distance services to Kyiv, Lviv and other cities.

Kherson is served by Kherson International Airport. It operates a 2,500 x 42-meter concrete runway, accommodating Boeing 737, Airbus 319/320 aircraft, and helicopters of all series.

== Economy ==
- Kherson Shipyard
- VVV-Spetstekhnika dredger factory

== Education ==
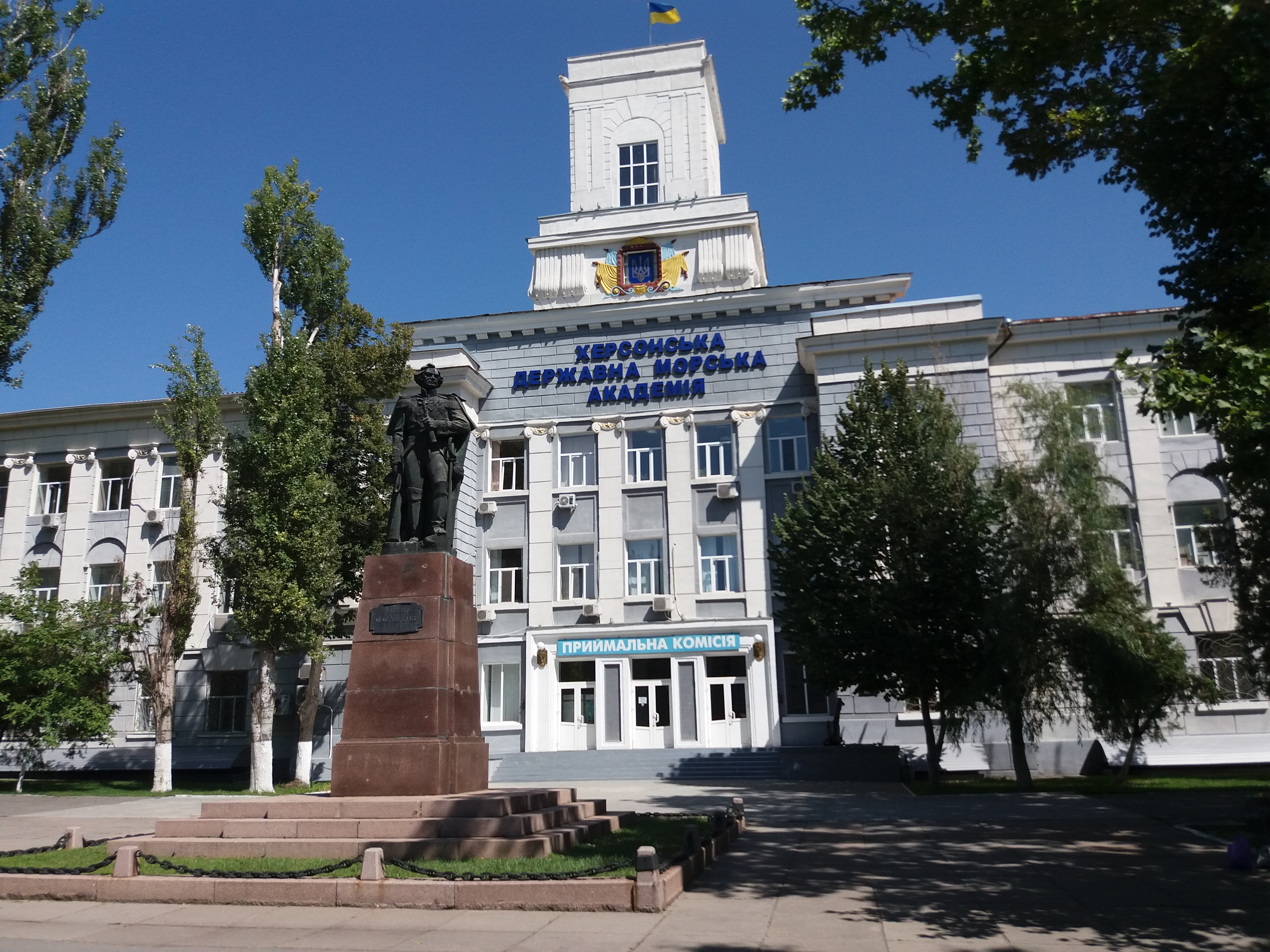
Kherson State Maritime Academy

There are 77 high schools as well as 5 colleges. There are 15 institutions of higher education, including:

- Kherson State Maritime Academy
- Kherson State Agrarian and Economic University
- Kherson State University
- Kherson National Technical University
- International University of Business and Law

The documentary Dixie Land was filmed at a music school in Kherson.

== Sights ==
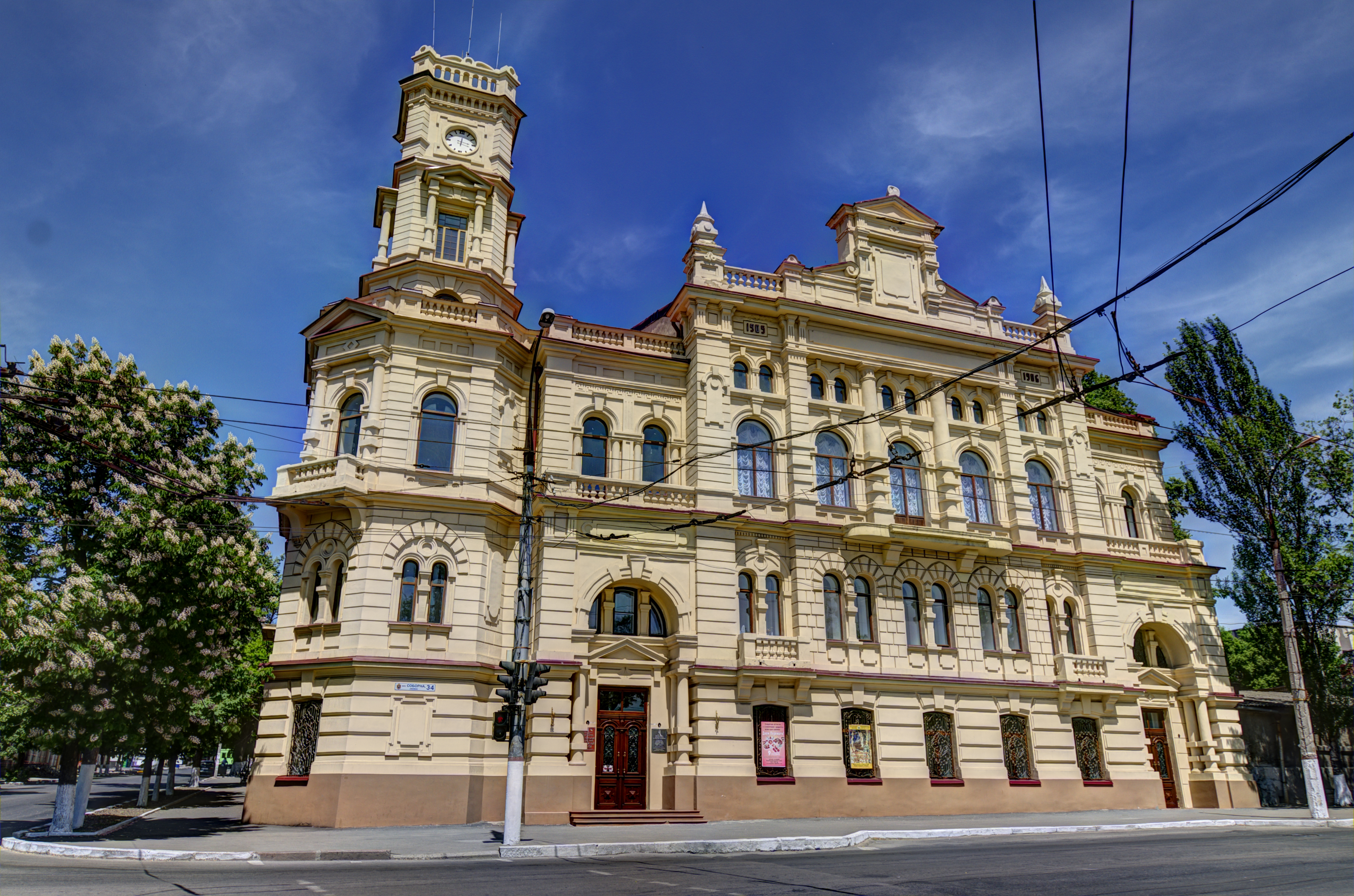
Kherson Art Museum

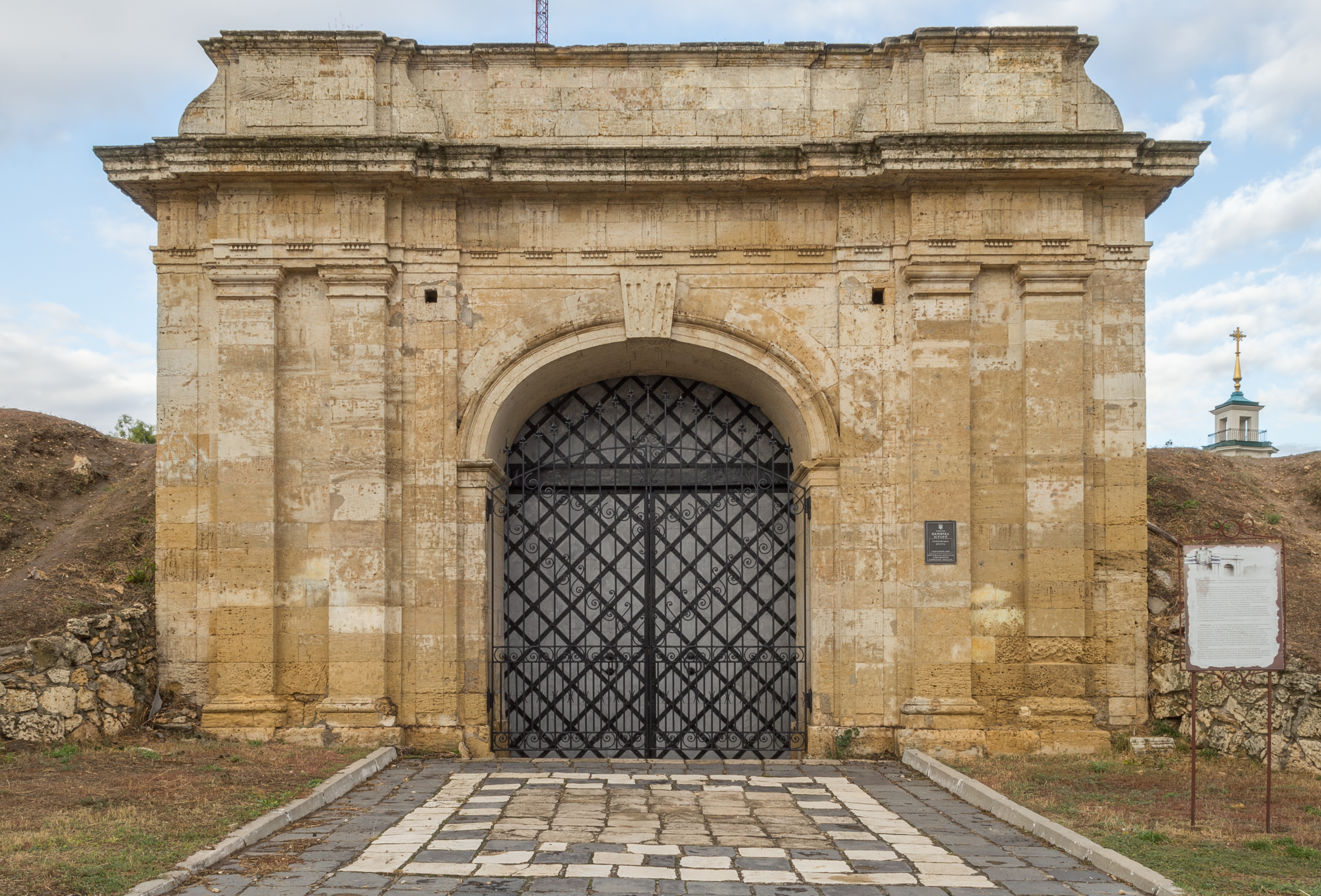
Ochakiv Gate

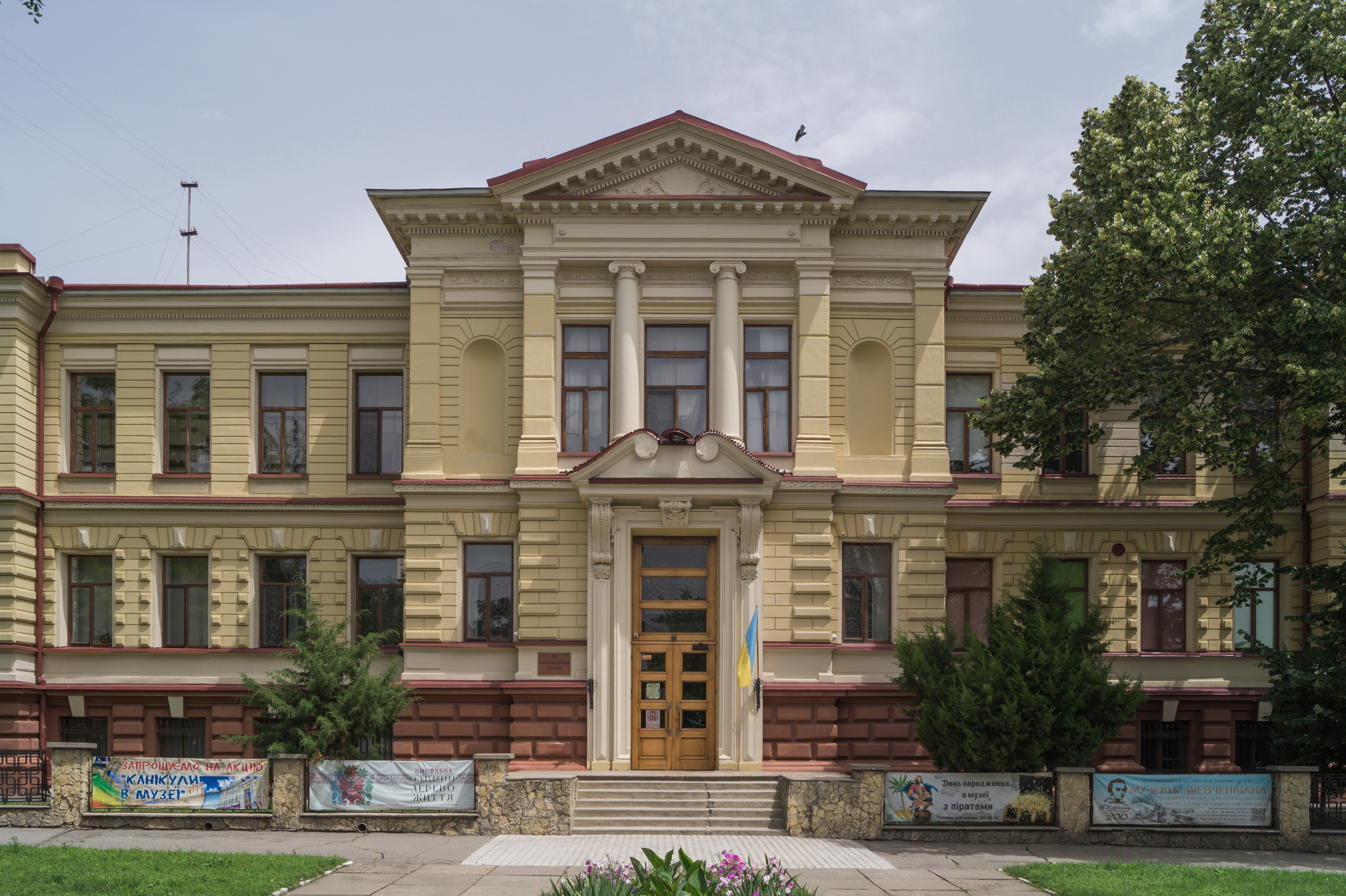
Kherson Local History Museum

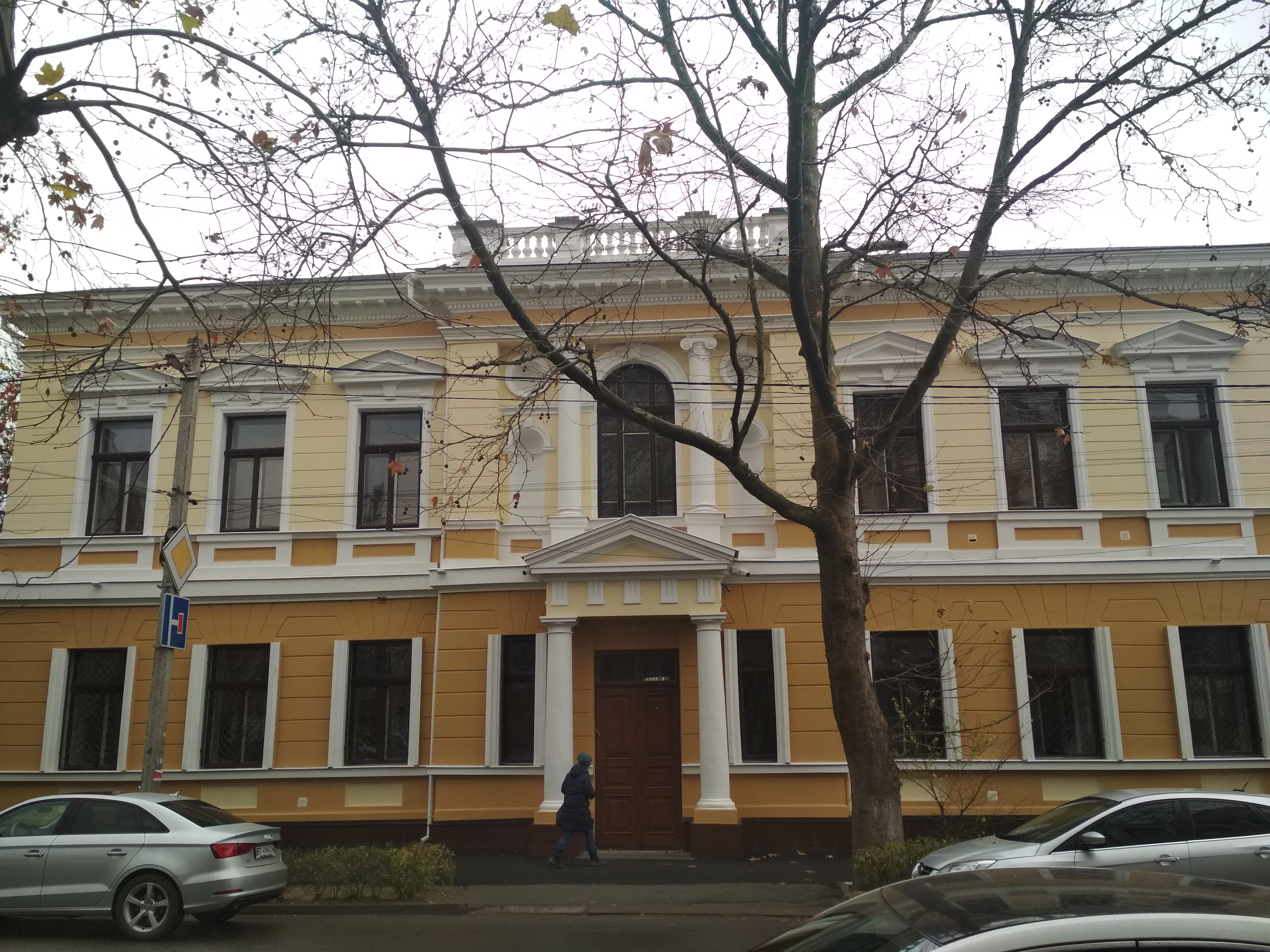
Kherson Nature Museum

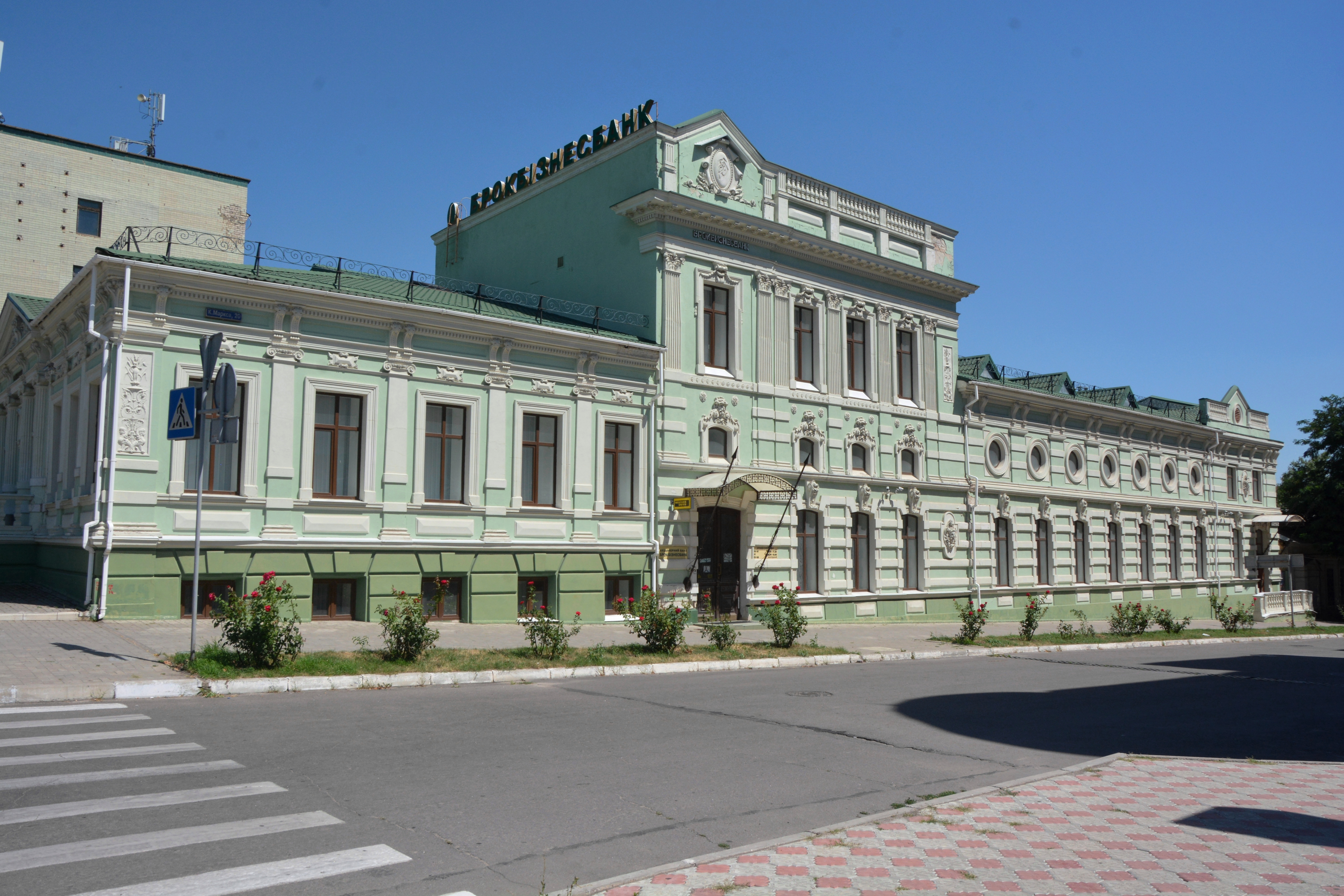
Ukrainian People's House

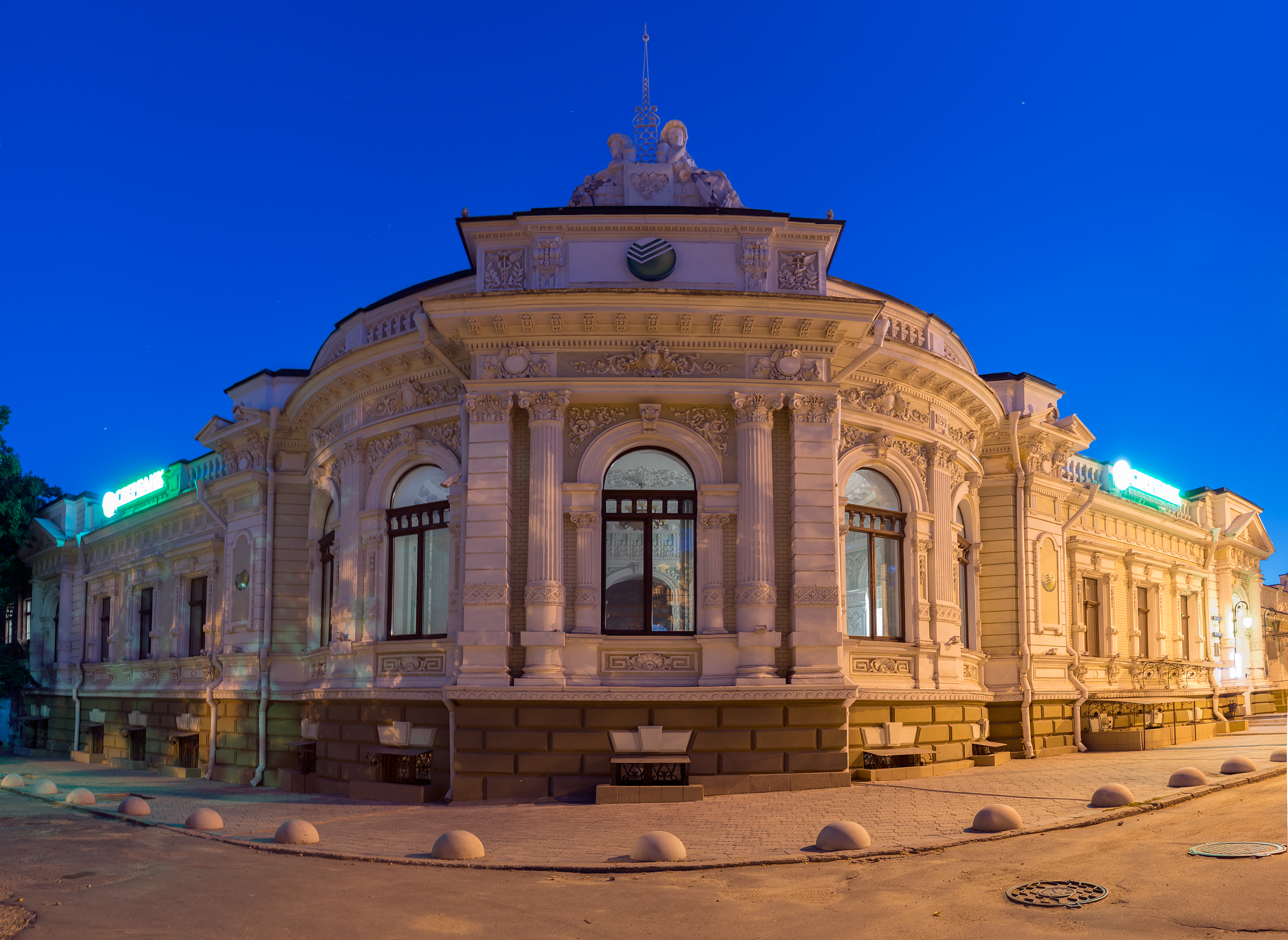
Mutual Credit Society building

- Church of St. Catherine, built in the 1780s, supposedly to Ivan Starov's designs, and contains the tomb of Prince Grigory Potemkin.
- Kherson Art Museum has a collection of icons, and Ukrainian and Russian paintings and sculptures. Particularly noteworthy are Portrait of a Woman (1883) by Konstantin Makovsky; The Tempest is Coming by Ivan Aivazovsky; Sunset by Alexei Savrasov; Cattle Yard in Abramtsevo by Vasily Polenov; At the Stone by Ivan Kramskoi; The Charioteer, by Peter Clodt von Jürgensburg (sculptor); Prince Svyatoslav by Eugene Lanceray (sculptor); Mephistopheles by Mark Antokolsky (sculptor); Near the Monastery by German painter August von Bayer (1859); Oaks (1956); Moloditsya (1938) and Still Life with the Blue Broom (1930), by Oleksii Shovkunenko (born in Kherson).
- Kherson Local History Museum
- Kherson Nature Museum
- Gates and ramparts of the Kherson Fortress from the 18th century
- Arsenal from the 18th century
- Ukrainian People's House, former seat of various Ukrainian institutions in the early 20th century
- Saint Sophia Greek church from the 18th century
- Mutual Credit Society building
- Jewish cemetery – Kherson has a large Jewish community which was established in the mid-nineteenth century.
- Kherson TV Tower
- Adziogol Lighthouse, a hyperboloid structure designed by Vladimir Shukhov in 1911
- Shevchenko Park
- Holy Spirit Cathedral, built in 1810–1836
- Post office building, where the first civilian radio telegraph station in Ukraine was established
- Former house of poet Kosta Khetagurov

== Notable people ==
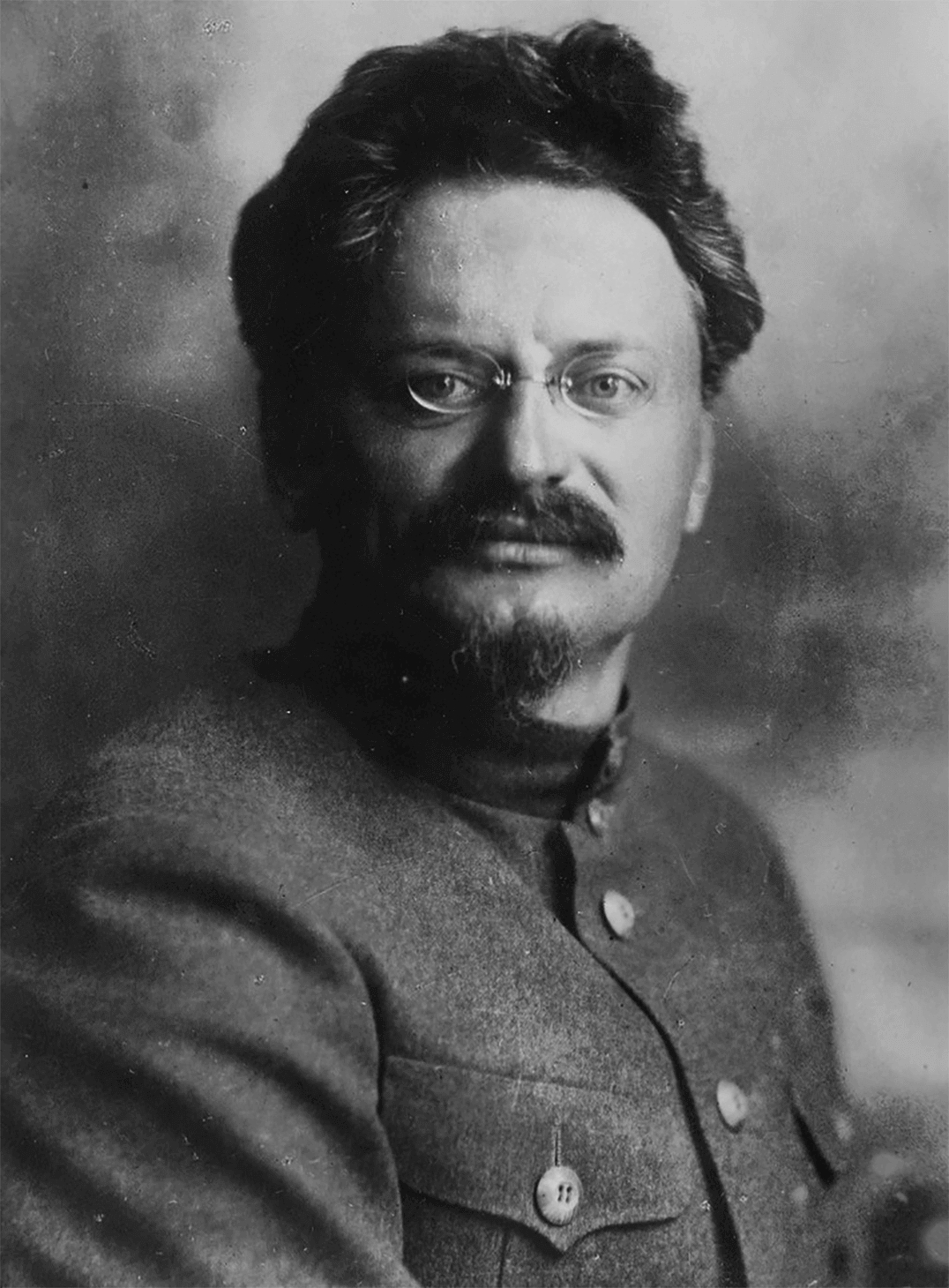
Lev Bronstein (Leon Trotsky), 1924

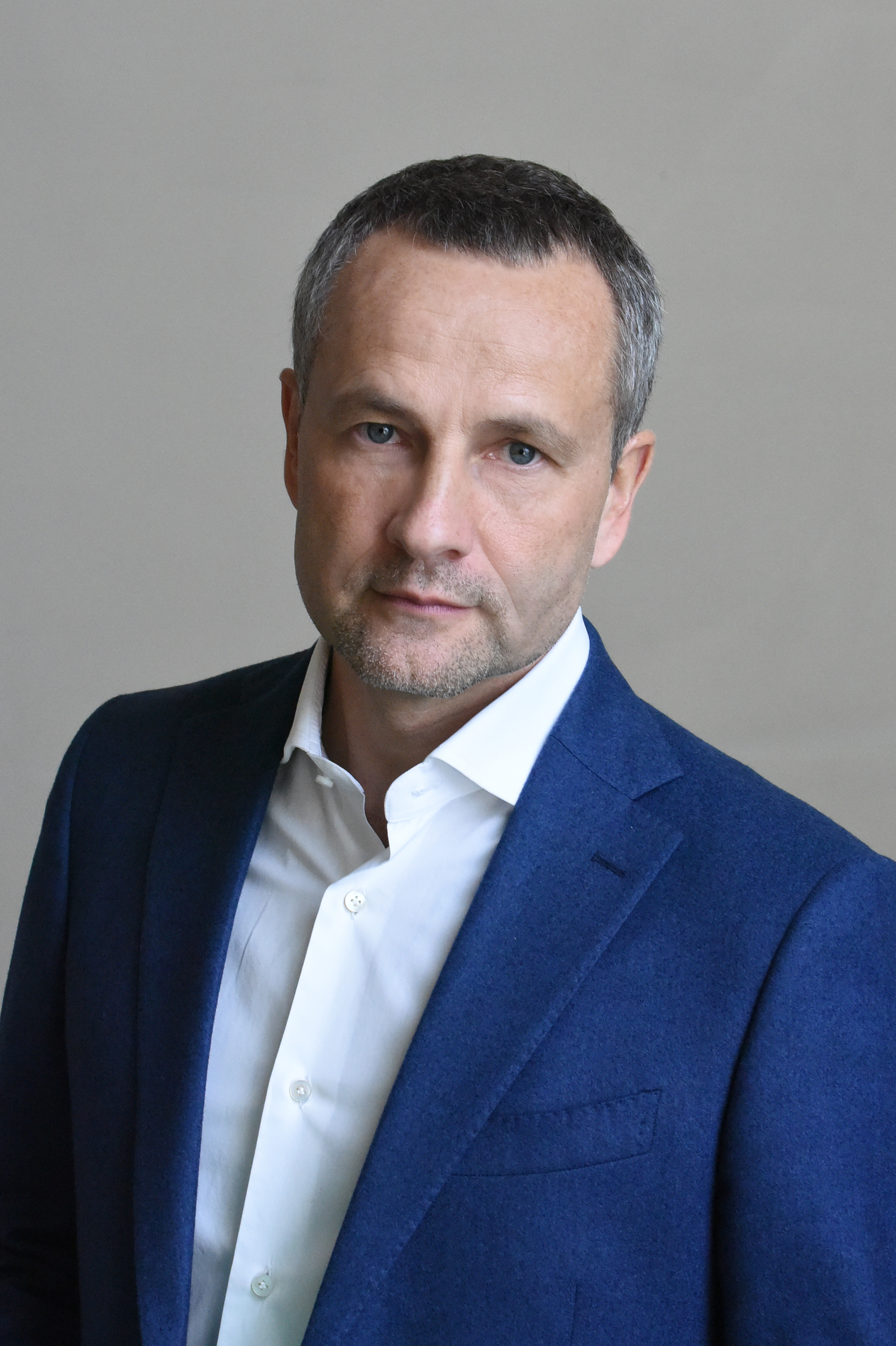
Ihor Kolykhaiev, 2020

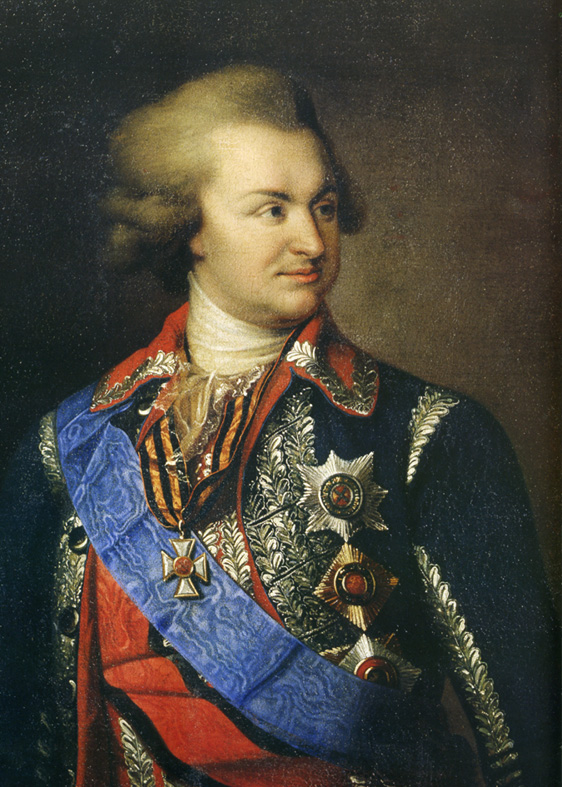
Portrait of Grigory Potemkin

- Grigory Adamov (1886–1945), Soviet science fiction writer
- Georgy Arbatov (1923–2010), Soviet and Russian political scientist.
- Vladimir Baranov-Rossine (1888–1944), Ukrainian/Russian/French painter, avant-garde artist and inventor.
- Max Barskih (born 1990), Ukrainian singer and songwriter.
- Kristina Berdynskykh (born 1983), political journalist.
- Stefania Berlinerblau (1852–1921), American anatomist and physician, investigated blood circulation
- Maximilian Bern (1849–1923), German writer and editor.
- Sergei Bondarchuk (1920–1994), Soviet and Russian actor, film director, and screenwriter
- Lev Davidovitch Bronstein (1879–1940), better known as Leon Trotsky, Bolshevik revolutionary and Marxist theorist, was born in the village of Bereslavka, Kherson Governorate.
- Artem Datsyshyn (1979–2022), Ukrainian ballet dancer and soloist
- Ivan Gannibal (1735–1801), eminent Russian military leader and a founder of the city
- Sergei Garmash (born 1958), Soviet and Russian film and stage actor.
- Yefim Golïshev (1897–1970), painter and composer associated with the Dada movement in Berlin.
- Nikolai Grinko (1920–1989), Soviet and Ukrainian actor
- Kateryna Handziuk (1985–2018), Ukrainian civil rights and anti-corruption activist
- John Howard (1726–1790), English prison reformer; he died of typhus whilst in Kherson.
- Mircea Ionescu-Quintus (1917–2017), Romanian politician, writer and jurist
- Yurii Kerpatenko (1976–2022), Ukrainian conductor
- Ihor Kolykhaiev (born 1971), Ukrainian politician and entrepreneur, Mayor of Kherson since 2020
- Roman Kostenko (born 1983), Ukrainian military officer and People's Deputy of Ukraine (Holos)
- Oleh Nikolenko (born 1986), Ukrainian diplomat
- Samuel Maykapar (1867–1938), Russian romantic composer, pianist and professor of music
- Yuriy Odarchenko (born 1960), a politician, Governor of Kherson Oblast since 2014
- Nicholas Perry (born 1992), social media personality, known online as Nikocado Avocado
- Sergei Polunin (born 1989), Russian ballet dancer, actor and model.
- Prince Grigory Potemkin (1739–1791), military leader, statesman and nobleman; a founder of the city.
- Maria Reva, Canadian writer of Ukrainian descent
- Nissan Rilov (1922–2007), former soldier, Israeli artist and supporter of Palestinians
- Salomon Rosenblum (1873–1925), later known as Sidney Reilly, a secret agent, adventurer and playboy, employed by the British Secret Intelligence Service; may have inspired spy character, James Bond.
- Moshe Sharett (1894–1965), 2nd Prime Minister of Israel from 1953 to 1955
- Viktor Petrovich Skarzhinsky (1787–1861), wealthy landowner; squadron commander in the Russian Patriotic War of 1812
- Inna Shevchenko (born 1990), Ukrainian feminist and leader of the women's movement FEMEN
- Sergei Stanishev (born 1966), Bulgarian politician, 49th Prime Minister of Bulgaria
- Prince Alexander Suvorov (1730–1800), Russian general; a founder of the city.
- Svitlana Tarabarova (born 1990), Ukrainian singer, songwriter, music producer and actress.
- Mikhail Yemtsev (1930–2003), Soviet and Russian science fiction writer

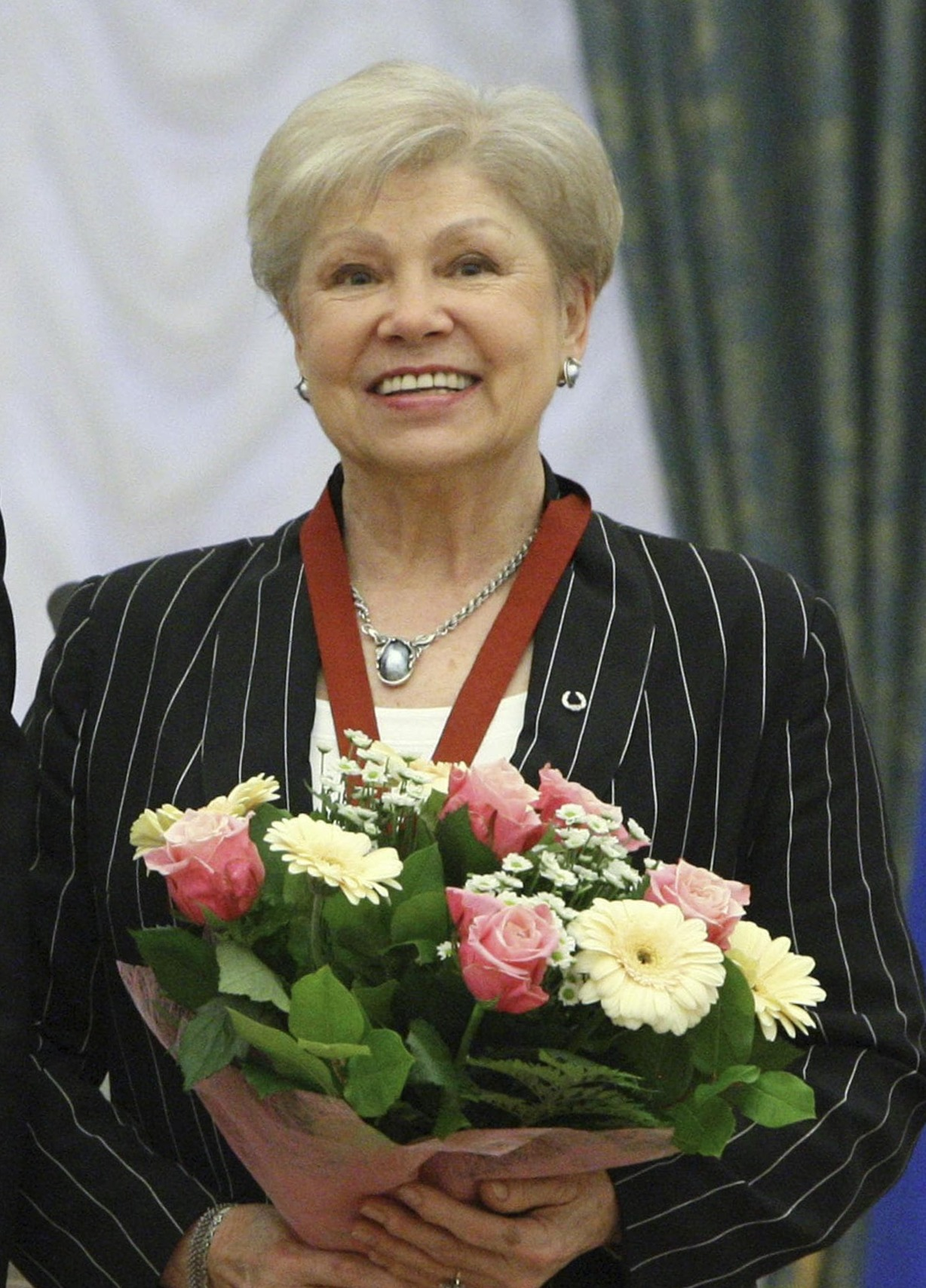
Larisa Latynina, 2010

=== Sport ===
- Anastasiia Chetverikova (born 1998), sprint canoeist, team silver medallist at the 2020 Summer Olympics
- Inna Gaponenko (born 1976), chess player, International Master & Woman Grandmaster.
- Oleksandr Holovko (born 1972), former footballer with 414 club caps and 58 for Ukraine
- Pavlo Ishchenko (born 1992), Ukrainian-Israeli boxer
- Oleksandr Karavayev (born 1992), footballer with over 250 club caps and 45 for Ukraine
- Yevhen Kucherevskyi (1941–2006), Ukrainian football coach of Dnipro Dnipropetrovsk
- Larisa Latynina (born 1934), Soviet gymnast, has won nine Olympic gold medals
- Tatiana Lysenko (born 1975), Soviet and Ukrainian gymnast, two gold and a bronze medal at the 1992 Summer Olympics
- Yuriy Maksymov (born 1968), football coach and former midfielder with 384 club caps and 27 for Ukraine.
- Kyrylo Marsak (born 2004), Ukrainian figure skater and olympic athlete
- Yuri Nikitin (born 1978), gymnast and gold medallist at the 2004 Summer Olympics
- Tancerev Mykola Olegovich (born 1997), professional rower
- Sergei Postrekhin (born 1957), sprint canoer, gold and silver medallist at the 1980 Summer Olympics
- Serhiy Shevchenko (1958-2024), Ukrainian football player and coach
- Serhiy Tretyak (born 1963), retired Ukrainian footballer with over 500 club caps
- David Tyshler (1927–2014), Ukrainian/Soviet fencer, two gold and a bronze medal at the 1956 Summer Olympics
- Roman Vintov (born 1978), former Russian/Ukrainian footballer with over 460 club caps

== Twin cities ==
- Zalaegerszeg, Hungary
- Shumen, Bulgaria
- Izmit, Turkey
- Bizerte, Tunisia
- Bonn, Germany
- Kiel, Germany
