= Maksim Vintov =

Russian footballer

Personal information
- Full name: Maksim Vasilyevich Vintov
- Date of birth: 22 January 1985 (age 41)
- Height: 1.78 m (5 ft 10 in)
- Position: Midfielder

Senior career*
Years	Team	Apps	(Gls)
2001–2002	Arsenal-2 Tula	53	(4)
2003	Dynamo Tula	13	(1)
2003–2004	Reutov	35	(8)
2005	Dynamo Makhachkala	14	(2)
2005	Reutov	10	(2)
2006–2007	Vityaz Podolsk	34	(8)
2008	Avangard Podolsk		
2009	Olimp-SKOPA Zheleznodorozhny		
2010	Gornyak Uchaly	3	(0)
2010	Mostovik-Primorye Ussuriysk	10	(1)
- * Club domestic league appearances and goals

Maksim Vasilyevich Vintov (Russian: Максим Васильевич Винтов; born 22 January 1985) is a former Russian professional football player.

== Club career ==
He played one season in the Russian Football National League for FC Dynamo Makhachkala.

== Personal life ==
His older brother Roman Vintov is also a footballer.
