= Roman Vintov =

Russian footballer

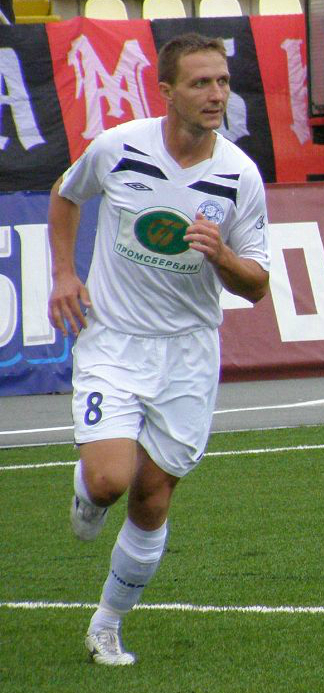

Personal information
- Full name: Roman Vasilyevich Vintov
- Date of birth: 1 July 1978 (age 48)
- Place of birth: Kherson, Ukrainian SSR
- Height: 1.74 m (5 ft 8 1/2 in)
- Positions: Defender; midfielder

Senior career*
Years	Team	Apps	(Gls)
1993–1994	FC Tavriya Kherson	6	(0)
1995–1996	FC Luch Tula	29	(4)
1997	FC Arsenal Tula	15	(1)
1998	FC Arsenal-2 Tula	19	(0)
1999	FC Saturn-2 Ramenskoye	36	(2)
2000	FC Vityaz Podolsk (D4)		
2001	FC Arsenal Tula	22	(0)
2002–2008	FC Vityaz Podolsk	219	(10)
2009–2010	FC Avangard Podolsk	53	(1)
2011–2012	FC Petrotrest Saint Petersburg	39	(0)
2012–2014	FC Kaluga	55	(10)
2014	FC Dolgoprudny	9	(0)
- * Club domestic league appearances and goals

Roman Vasilyevich Vintov (Russian: Роман Васильевич Винтов; born 1 July 1978) is a former Russian professional football player. He also held Ukrainian citizenship as Roman Vasylyovych Vintov (Ukrainian: Роман Васильович Вінтов).

== Club career ==
He played 2 seasons in the Russian Football National League for FC Arsenal Tula and FC Vityaz Podolsk.

== Personal life ==
His younger brother Maksim Vintov is also a footballer.
