= Kherson National Technical University =

Public university in Kherson, Ukraine

Coordinates: 46.6686°N 32.6375°E

- Херсонський національний технічний університет
- Motto: Per aspera ad astra
- Established: 1959
- Affiliations: Ministry of Education and Science of Ukraine
- Rector: Olena Chepelyuk
- Students: 5,450
- Location: Kherson, Ukraine
- Website: www.kntu.net.ua

The Kherson National Technical University (Ukrainian: Херсонський національний технічний університет, romanized: Khersonskyi Natsionalnyi Technichnyi Universytet) is a technical institution in Kherson, Ukraine.

== History ==
The university was established in 1959 by a group of visiting students who were employed at Kherson Cotton, an organized training and consulting point (NCP) affiliated with the Kyiv Technological Institute of Light Industry. In 1960, the Faculty of General Studies (BTF) was founded, utilizing the resources and structure of the NCP as its foundation.

Under the directive of the Ministry of Education of the USSR, the Kherson Faculty of General Studies (BTF) was transferred to the Odesa Technological Institute of Food Industry University, now known as the Mykolayiv V. O. Sukhomlynsky National University (OTIHP), in 1961. This decision led to the integration of the Kherson BTF into the academic structure of the OTIHP.

In 1962, the Kherson branch of the Odesa Technological Institute (OTIHP) was established, comprising two faculties: Mechanics and General Technical and Technological. Following its establishment, the Kherson branch experienced rapid growth and development.

In December 1980, the Kherson Industrial Institute was founded based on the branch of the OTIHP. It became the only university in Ukraine that focused on training engineers for the primary processing of flax, weaving and spinning.

In 1997, the Kherson Industrial Institute established a postsecondary education program, as per the Cabinet of Ministers of Ukraine decree dated March 24, 1997, No. 254. Furthermore, on November 15, 2004, by the decree of the President of Ukraine No. 1403/2004, the Kherson Industrial Institute was granted national status for its postsecondary education program.

== Campuses and buildings ==
The Kherson National Technical University (KNTU) has a well-established material and technological infrastructure. It comprises seven study buildings, a science and technology library, a computer center, three dormitories, a dining room, a buffet, sports complexes, and recreational facilities on the Dnieper River. Additionally, the university provides a student polyclinic to cater to the healthcare needs of its students.

== Institutes and faculties ==
- Faculty of Economics
- Faculty of Cybernetics
- Faculty of Technology and Design
- Faculty of Engineering
- Department of International Economic Relations
- Faculty of correspondence and distance learning

Remote subdivisions HNTU:

- Theodosia faculty HNTU
- Perekopsky faculty HNTU
- Kerch Department HNTU
- Genichesk faculty HNTU
- Tavricheskiy Regional Faculty
- Yalta training and consulting center

== See also ==
List of universities in Ukraine
