= Battle of Kherson =

Part of the Russian invasion of Ukraine

Coordinates: 46°38′N 32°36′E

- Part of the southern front of the Russo-Ukrainian war
Date	1 March 2022
Location	In and around Kherson, Ukraine
Result	Russian victory

Belligerents
Russia	Ukraine

Units involved
42nd Guards Motor Rifle Division; 56th Guards Air Assault Regiment	59th Motorized Brigade; 80th Air Assault Brigade; 192nd Territorial Defense Battalion; 194th Territorial Defense Battalion

Casualties and losses
1 Mi-24 helicopter Per Lahuta: Heavy	Per Kolykhaiev: Up to 300 soldiers and civilians killed

The Battle of Kherson took place on 1 March 2022 on the southern front of the Russo-Ukrainian war. Russian forces captured the city on 1 March 2022 after brief combat with local territorial defense fighters, and then began a military occupation of the city.

The fall of Kherson was a major defeat for Ukraine; Kherson was the only regional capital to be captured by Russian forces during the invasion.

== Background ==
=== Russian invasion ===
In the early hours of 24 February, a large Russian force, estimated by Ukrainian military expert Serhii Hrabskyi to be 35,000 men strong, invaded Kherson Oblast from Crimea. Fighting was soon reported in Chonhar, on the border with Crimea, and residents of the town of Chaplynka in southern Kherson Oblast observed columns of tanks, armored personnel carriers, and multiple rocket launchers moving in the direction of Nova Kakhovka.

Dmytro Ishchenko, the commander of the Kherson Oblast territorial defense brigade, was informed at approximately 5:00 a.m. that an invasion was underway, and began preparations for Kherson's defense. Kherson International Airport was bombarded shortly afterwards. Hundreds of Kherson residents soon flocked to the city's military headquarters to receive weapons and volunteer for the defense of Kherson. Ultimately, about 500 civilians would enlist in the 192nd Kherson Battalion of the Territorial Defense Forces.

At approximately 11:00 a.m., a Russian column reached Nova Kakhovka from Crimea, hanging the Russian flag over the city's hydroelectric power plant. Around the same time, Russian forces disembarked from helicopters and took up positions around the Antonivka Road Bridge and the village of Antonivka. With both of the area's crossings of the Dnieper River under Russian control, Ukraine's 59th Brigade of about 1,200 men was effectively surrounded outside of Oleshky.

=== Withdrawal of Ukrainian regular army ===
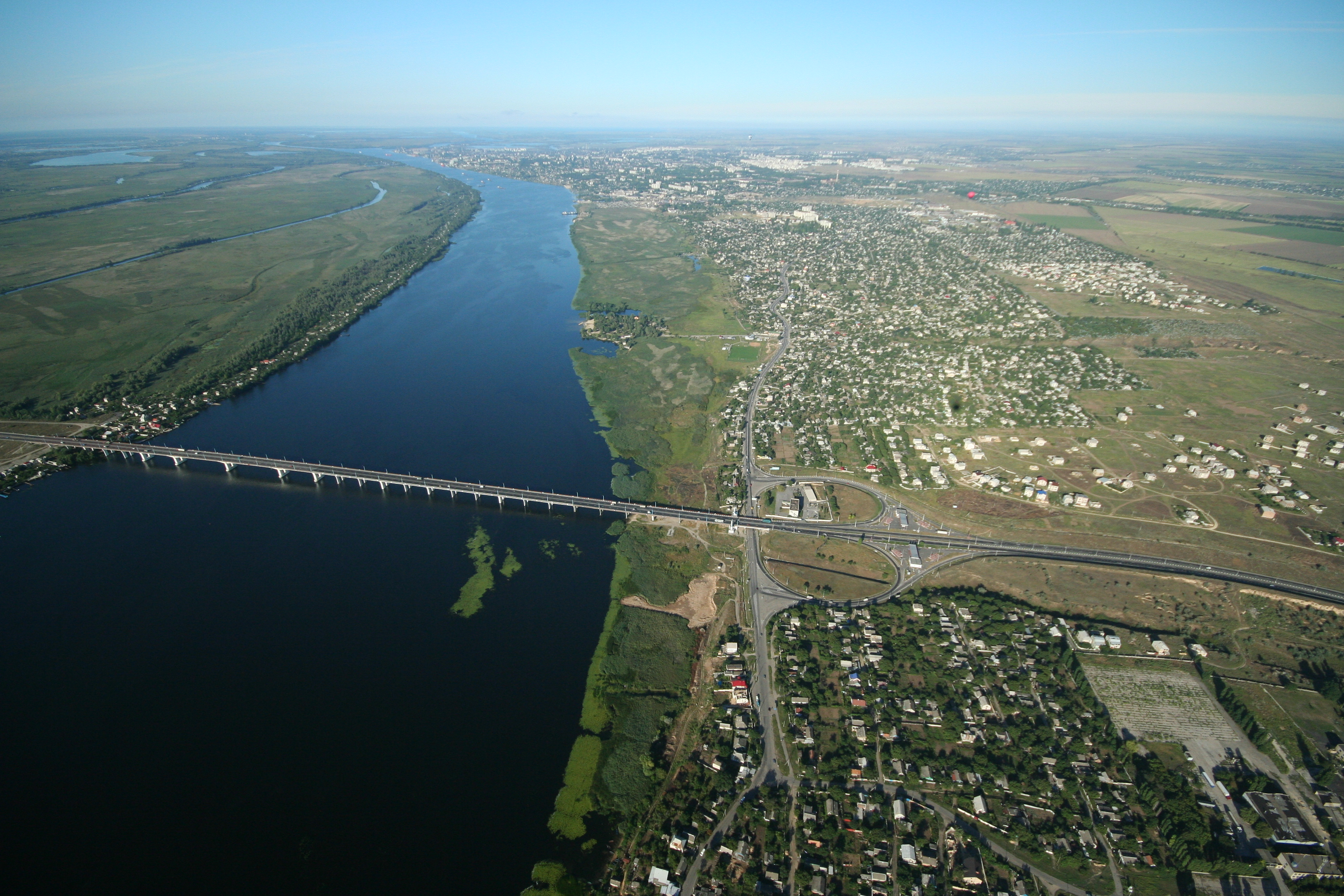
The Antonivka Road Bridge, pictured in 2006

By mid-day, most civilian volunteers from Kherson had been deployed to the 192nd Battalion's base in Naddniprianske, 8 kilometres (5.0 mi) outside of the city. Ka-52 helicopters fired on battalion members as they retrieved weapons from the battalion's warehouses near Antonivka and Sadove, and an Mi-8 transport helicopter was observed preparing to land paratroopers in the area of the Antonivka Railway Bridge.

At 3:00 p.m., a company of territorial defense fighters began moving towards the road bridge to force the Russian paratroopers out and open a path for the encircled 59th Brigade to withdraw over the Dnieper. Of the 78 men in the company, one was killed and three others wounded, including the company's commander, Oleksandr Berezovsky, by a Russian air raid as they approached the bridge. Two more companies of territorial defense advanced toward the bridge, and despite additional airstrikes, the Ukrainians took control of the bridge and managed to cover the retreat of the 59th Brigade, which withdrew to the city of Mykolaiv. The territorial defense units returned to Naddniprianske sometime between 8:00 p.m. and midnight. Governor of Mykolaiv Oblast Vitalii Kim credited the counterattack on the bridge with preventing a Russian attack on Mykolaiv.

Around midnight, the tank battalion of the 59th Brigade, which had remained positioned at the bridge, was met with a massive Russian bombardment involving fighter planes, Ka-52 attack helicopters, FAB-500 bombs, mortars and artillery. After an hour-long battle, the battalion was forced to withdraw to the village of Molodizhne, having suffered heavy casualties; according to commander Yevhen Palchenko, only one of the battalion's companies had remained intact. However, the unit would soon be ordered back to the bridge to support units of Ukraine's 80th Brigade, which had begun pushing Russian forces back from the bridge. Fighting continued throughout the early hours of 25 February.

Around 4:00 a.m. on 25 February, part of the 192nd Battalion was sent to prevent a bridge over the Inhulets River at Darivka from being captured by Russian paratroopers. They observed a Russian column on the opposite site of the Inhulets, and withdrew shortly thereafter, having received information that a column of Russian tanks was crossing the Antonivka Road Bridge.

In the morning, a CNN team visited the Antonivka Road Bridge in the aftermath of the battle and found disabled military vehicles, dead soldiers, and craters caused by shelling. The bridge was still defended by Ukrainian soldiers, one of whom told the reporters that the nearest Russian positions were about 3 kilometres (1.9 mi) away. The Russians were stationed at the southern side of the bridge, near Oleshky, but were said to not be disturbing civilians, who freely drove from one side to the other in personal vehicles. Shelling of Ukrainian positions and residential areas continued in the afternoon, and by dusk, governor of Kherson Oblast Hennadiy Lahuta announced that the Ukrainian military had lost control of the bridge and the city's defenses had fallen.

=== Russian encirclement of Kherson ===
Ukrainian forces withdrew from the Antonivka Bridge to Kherson International Airport in Chornobaivka on 26 February. The same day, Russian forces began unexpectedly advancing on the airport, forcing the Ukrainian units stationed there to retreat towards Mykolaiv.

On the morning of 26 February, mayor Ihor Kolykhaiev announced that Kherson remained under Ukrainian control. According to a Tweet by The Kyiv Independent, Russian forces pulled back from Kherson after a Ukrainian air strike on Russian armored vehicles. A Ukrainian official, Anton Herashchenko, published footage of a destroyed column of Russian military vehicles near Radensk and Oleshky, just south of Kherson. A Russian Mi-24 was shot down in Sahy, Kherson.

On the morning of 27 February, the Russian Ministry of Defence stated that Russian forces had encircled Kherson and, according to Ukrainian officials, had captured a part of the city, including the airport. Later in the morning, the Ukrainian Air Force allegedly conducted a successful drone strike against Russian forces in the town of Chornobaivka, just to the north of Kherson.

By 28 February, the Institute for the Study of War assessed that Russian troops had likely completely encircled Kherson.

== Battle ==
In the early morning of 1 March, Ukrainian officials stated that Russian forces had launched a renewed assault on Kherson and were advancing from Kherson International Airport to the highway between Kherson and Mykolaiv. While conducting heavy shelling, Russian forces surrounded the city, reached the highway, and advanced to the village of Komyshany before establishing a checkpoint. A Ukrainian official announced that Russian forces had entered Kherson later in the day, but claimed that the city administration building remained under Ukrainian control.

At dawn on 1 March, Russian soldiers were seen entering Kherson's Shumensky district.

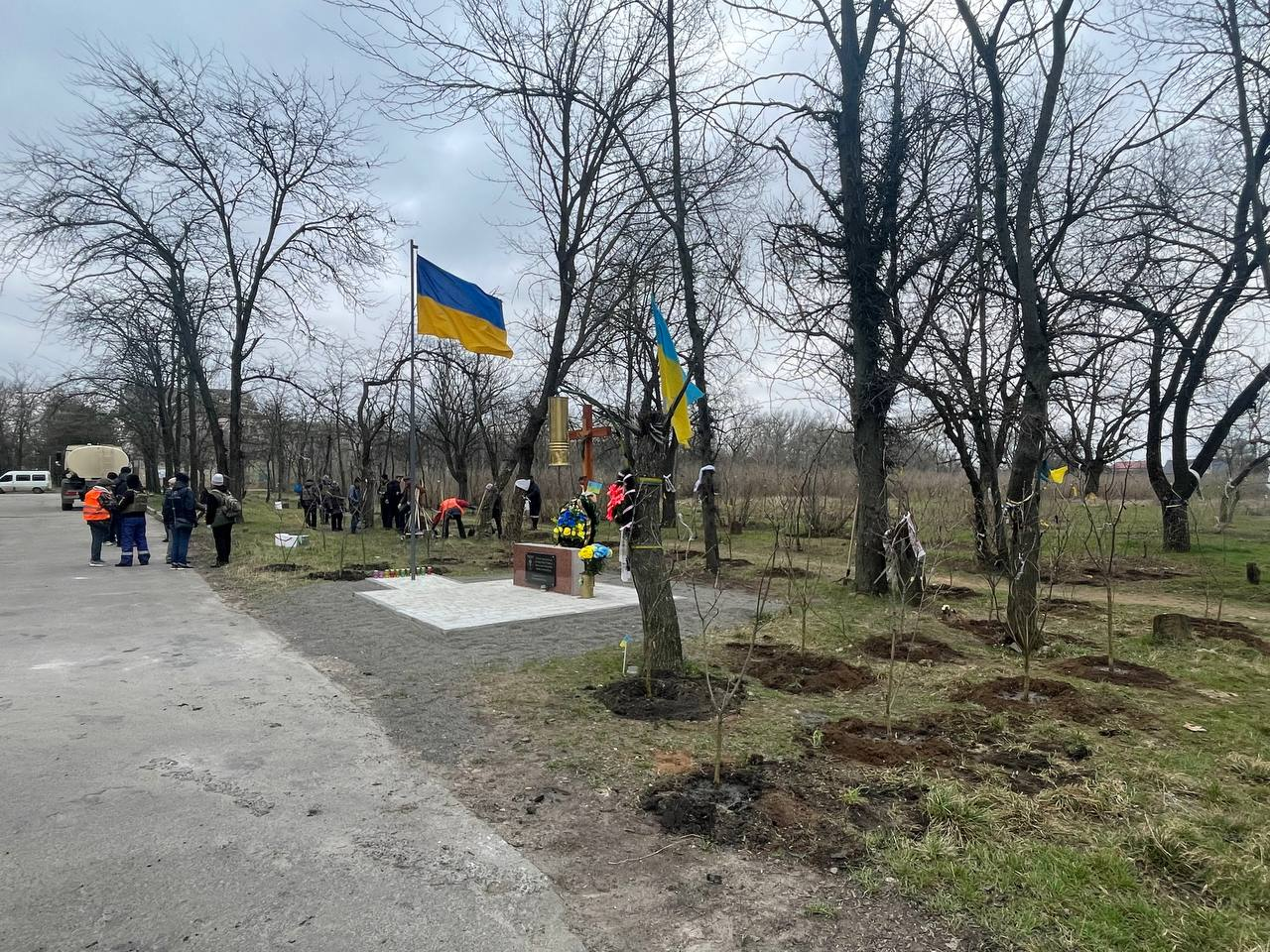
Memorial to the Kherson Territorial Defense fighters in Lilac Park

On the morning of 1 March, Ishchenko divided the Kherson and Bilozerka territorial defense battalions into five groups and deployed them to the five main entrances of the city of Kherson. By 07:30, the 1st Company of the Bilozerka battalion was sent to defend a lyceum near Bilozerka Square. while the 2nd Company was assigned to defend Lilac Park. Three companies of the Kherson battalion were deployed to the "Fabryka" shopping mall, the "Salyut" shopping mall, and the entrance to the city from Chornobaivka. All but one of the companies would engage in combat with invading Russian forces later that day.

=== Lyceum and Bilozerka Square ===
A group of 30–40 civilians had gathered at the entrance to Kherson from the village of Bilozerka on the evening of 28 February, amid rumors on social media that Russian forces would be entering the city there. They were unarmed except for two policemen with assault rifles. The group felled trees on the roads the Russian forces were anticipated to use, to impede their movement and facilitate ambushes with Molotov cocktails. By 01:00 on 1 March, the group left the area.

By 10:00, a company of the Bilozerka territorial defense battalion, commanded by battalion chief of staff Serhii Bodnar, took up positions at the lyceum and at the Bilozerka square roundabout. Soon 40 Russian troops and a Tiger military vehicle approached the roundabout and a firefight ensued. The Ukrainians claimed to have killed two Russians and wounded one, while the Kherson police later announced that seven Ukrainian fighters had been killed at the battle near the lyceum.

=== Lilac Park ===
Around 10:00, more than 40 Ukrainian soldiers of the 2nd Company of the Bilozerka battalion, led by battalion commander Dmytro Kuzmenko, went to Lilac Park, in the city's Korabelnyi district, near the Kherson Refinery. The Ukrainian military expected only light Russian infantry to be present in Lilac Park. However, when they arrived, the Russian military was fully present, with tanks and armored vehicles. At around 11:00 a.m., a 20–30-minute engagement took place between Russian and Ukrainian soldiers at the park. The engagement left at least 24 Ukrainian soldiers dead, with the Russian military "finishing off" any wounded Ukrainian soldiers found after the battle. Only one Russian soldier was killed during the engagement. Some of the Ukrainian soldiers who survived the battle retreated to the oil refinery and later abandoned that position. It was later reported that the Russians suffered ten killed or wounded during this engagement.

=== Fabryka shopping mall ===
Members of the Kherson territorial defense battalion under company commander Mykhailo Baliuk arrived at their assigned positions at the Fabryka shopping mall a few hours before a Russian convoy attempted to enter the city from that direction, giving the Ukrainians some time to dig trenches and construct roadblocks. At midday, the Russians began approaching in several waves, and destroyed the Fabryka shopping mall with mortar shelling. At some point, Russian infantry bypassed and outflanked the Ukrainian position. After running out of ammunition, the Ukrainian fighters decided to retreat.

=== Russian capture of Kherson ===
During the day on 1 March, Russian infantry and military vehicles moved throughout the city from various directions. They surrounded the Kherson City Council, as well as the Kherson state maritime university, and captured the Kherson River Port building and the Kherson railway station.

By nighttime, they had reached the center of the city and were outside the Kherson Oblast administration building.

On the evening of 1 March, Russian forces occupied the port of Kherson. Pavel Filatyev, a former member of Russia's 56th Guards Air Assault Regiment who wrote a book on his experience in the war, compared the scene to paintings of barbarians sacking Rome, as "savage" Russian soldiers looted valuable goods and ate all the food they could find.

In the evening of 1 March, Kolykhaiev reported that Russian forces had captured the railway station and the Kherson River Port.

In the morning of 2 March, Russian forces were seen at Freedom Square, in central Kherson, where the Kherson Regional Administration building is located. Later in the day, a group of about ten Russian officers, including a commander, entered the Kherson City Council building, where Kolykhaiev was. That evening, Kolykhaiev announced that he had surrendered the city and that the Russian commander intended to set up a military administration. Kolykhaiev acknowledged the Ukrainian military was no longer present in Kherson, and another official stated that the Russian military was in all parts of the city.

== Aftermath ==
After capturing Kherson, Russia began a military occupation of the city. They used force to suppress protests by the local population. On 22 March, a Ukrainian official warned that Kherson was facing a "humanitarian catastrophe" as the city was running out of food and medical supplies. It accused Russia of blocking the evacuation of civilians to Ukraine-controlled territory. The Russian forces were reported to have committed human rights violations against the populace, including torture and arbitrary detentions.

On 23 March, Ukrainian forces launched counterattacks against Russian forces in Kherson Oblast.

== Casualties and war crimes ==
According to Mayor Kolykhaiev, speaking immediately after the fall of the city, the fighting led to the deaths of as many as 300 Ukrainian soldiers and civilians, and severe destruction of the city's infrastructure. He said that bodies were being buried in mass graves, and that many remains were unrecognizable. Kolykhaiev claimed that schools and tower blocks had been damaged by the fighting, and that residential buildings had been fired upon by Russian forces. Kolykhaiev claimed that on 1 March, Russian soldiers shot citizens who were armed with Molotov cocktails.

On 25 February, the Ukrainian Prosecutor General, Iryna Venediktova, claimed that Russian forces murdered a journalist and an ambulance driver near Kherson. Venediktova stated that Ukrainian law enforcement had opened criminal proceedings into the shootings. Ukrainian officials alleged that beginning on 27 February, Russian forces began moving civilians from nearby villages towards Kherson, attempting to use them as human shields.

Lahuta reported that the Russian military had taken "heavy losses" during combat for the Antonivskyi Road Bridge over the Dnieper River on 25 February. In May 2022, Valentyna Romanova, a writer for the European Consortium for Political Research, published that Ukraine sustained 300 military casualties during the battle, with the entire Ukrainian defense force at Kherson having been injured or killed during the fighting.

== Analysis ==
=== Treachery and collaboration ===
In November 2023, Gilbert W. Merkx, a professor at Duke University published an article in the Journal of Advanced Military Studies that stated Russia had captured Kherson with "little resistance". Merkx stated that Russia planned and attempted to execute an amphibious landing assault on the "Kherson-Mykolaiv-Odesa axis", but was stopped by the Ukrainian coastal defenses in the early stages of the invasion.

There were questions concerning how Kherson was captured so easily. Orysia Lutsevych, a member of the Chatham House, a British-based think tank stated that "Russia had its agents infiltrated into the Ukrainian security forces". On 1 April 2022, Ukrainian president Volodymyr Zelenskyy dismissed the head of the Security Service of Ukraine's Kherson regional branch and a general as traitors. Zelenskyy described their actions as that of "anti-heroes", and that he "...had trouble determining where their Fatherland is". An aide to a general was arrested for handing over maps of minefields to Russian forces and helping coordinate Russian airstrikes in the region.

=== Significance ===
In October 2022, the Spanish newspaper El País described the fall of Kherson as "Ukraine's worst defeat in the war". Kherson was the only oblast capital captured by Russian forces during the invasion. Strategically, Kherson has been described as "a gateway to Crimea", and as a key to control of the Dnieper river.

Vitalii Kim, the mayor of Mykolaiv, credited the territorial defense forces who held out at Kherson with delaying the Russian advance and giving Mykolaiv additional time to prepare its defense.

== See also ==
- Battle of Mykolaiv
- 2022 Kherson counteroffensive
- Liberation of Kherson
