= 8th Guards Combined Arms Army (Russia) =

Russian Ground Forces formation

- Great emblem
- Active: 2017–present
- Country: Russia (2017–present)
- Branch: Russian Ground Forces
- Type: Combined arms
- Size: Army
- Part of: Southern Military District
- Garrison/HQ: Novocherkassk
- Decorations: Guards

The 8th Guards Combined Arms Army (abbreviated 8th GCAA) is an army of the Russian Ground Forces, headquartered in Novocherkassk, Rostov Oblast, within Russia′s Southern Military District, that was formed in 2017. Military Unit в/ч 61877.

== Structure ==
The formation of the new 8th Combined Arms Army began in 2017; the first stage was intended to be completed in June 2017. The 8th Combined Arms Army as of 2021 includes:

- 150th Motor Rifle Division (re-established in 2016), also based at Novocherkassk (в/ч 22179).
  - 102nd Motor Rifle Regiment (в/ч 91706)
  - 103rd Motor Rifle Regiment (в/ч 91708)
  - 68th Tank Regiment (в/ч 91714)
  - 163rd Tank Regiment (в/ч 84839)
  - 174th Reconnaissance Battalion (в/ч 22265)
  - 381st Self-Propelled Artillery Regiment (в/ч 24390)
  - 224th Separate Anti-Tank Artillery Battalion
  - 933rd Anti-Aircraft Missile Regiment (в/ч 15269)
- 20th Guards Motor Rifle Division in the Volgograd region 9 (в/ч 58550)
  - 242nd Motor Rifle Regiment (Kamyshin)
  - 255th Motor Rifle Regiment (Volgograd) (в/ч 34605)
  - 33rd Motor Rifle Regiment (Kamyshin)
  - 944th Guards Self-Propelled Artillery Regiment (в/ч 21511)
  - 487th Separate Anti-Tank Battalion
  - 358th Anti-Aircraft Missile Regiment (в/ч 26006)
- 464th Rocket Brigade with the former 20th Guards Brigade reportedly having expanded into a division-strength formation.
- 428th Separate Tank Battalion (Volgograd proximity)
- 47th Missile Brigade (в/ч 33166) (equipped with the Iskander surface-to-surface missile system)
- 238th Artillery Brigade (equipped with 2A65 Msta-B guns and 9K57 Uragan multiple launch rocket systems)
- 77th Anti-Aircraft Missile Brigade was deployed at Korenovsk and equipped with S-300V4 anti-aircraft missile system.
- 39th NBC Regiment

Support to the army is to be provided by fighter aircraft, bombers and ground attack aircraft (primarily drawn from the 4th Air and Air Defence Forces Army) and, in certain areas, by ships and submarines of the Black Sea Fleet of the Russian Navy.

== Russian invasion of Ukraine ==
Units from the 8th Guards Army participated in the Russian invasion of Ukraine under the command of Lieutenant General Andrei Sychevoi.

According to experts, the 8th Combined Arms Army was intended to be a centrepiece of the Southern Military District in the southern European part of the Russian Federation, protecting from threats in that region.

Ukraine, the United States, and some analysts describe the 1st (Donetsk) and 2nd (Luhansk) Army Corps of the Russian separatist forces in Donbas, Ukraine, as under the command of the 8th CAA HQ. As of 2021, subordinate units within these corps are said to include: 4 Motorized Rifle Brigades, 2 Motorized Rifle Regiments, 2 special forces battalions, 1 tank battalion, 1 reconnaissance battalion and 1 artillery brigade (1st Corps) and 3 Motorized Rifle Brigades, 1 Motorized Rifle Regiment, 1 tank battalion, 1 reconnaissance battalion and 1 artillery brigade (2nd Corps).

Ukrainian officials reported that the commander of the army's 150th Motor Rifle Division, Major General Oleg Mityaev, was killed on 15 March in the Siege of Mariupol. Army commander Lieutenant General Andrey Mordvichev was claimed by Ukrainian intelligence to have been killed in action near Kherson airport in Chornobaivka on March 18, 2022 during the 2022 Chornobaivka attacks. This was proven wrong when a video showing Mordvichev and Ramzan Kadyrov was released ten days later. On 16 April, Russian officials admitted the death of army deputy commander Major General Vladimir Petrovich Frolov in combat in Ukraine.

The 8th Combined Arms Army has been involved in the 2023 Ukrainian counteroffensive around the city of Marinka.

On August 5, 2024, by Decree of the President of the Russian Federation, the army was awarded the honorary title of "Guards" for mass heroism and bravery, fortitude and courage shown by the army personnel in combat operations to protect the Fatherland and state interests in armed conflicts.

On June 30, 2025, the commander, Ruslan Goryachkin, and "dozens" of officers of the 8th Guards was killed in an alleged Ukrainian Storm Shadow missile strike targeting a headquarters in occupied Donetsk.
