= 34th Marine Brigade =

Ukrainian military unit

34th Marine Brigade 34th Coastal Defense Brigade (2025-2026) 124th Territorial Defense Brigade (2018-2025)
- 34 окрема бригада Морської Піхоти
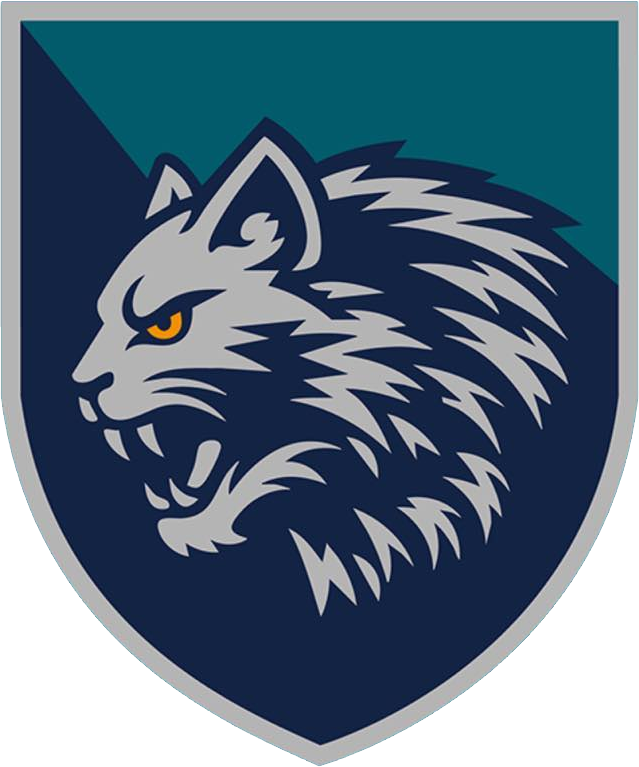
- Active: 30 June 2018 – present
- Country: Ukraine
- Branch: Ukrainian Marine Corps
- Type: Marines
- Role: Marine Infantry
- Size: Brigade
- Part of: 30th Marine Corps
- Garrison/HQ: Kherson, Kherson Oblast
- Nickname: Borysfen Brigade
- Motto: Victory in Every Step
- Engagements: Russo-Ukrainian War; Russian invasion of Ukraine; Southern Ukraine campaign; Battle of Kherson; Dnieper campaign (2022–present)
- Website: Official Facebook page

Commanders
- Current commander: Lieutenant Colonel Dmytro Pulinets

Insignia
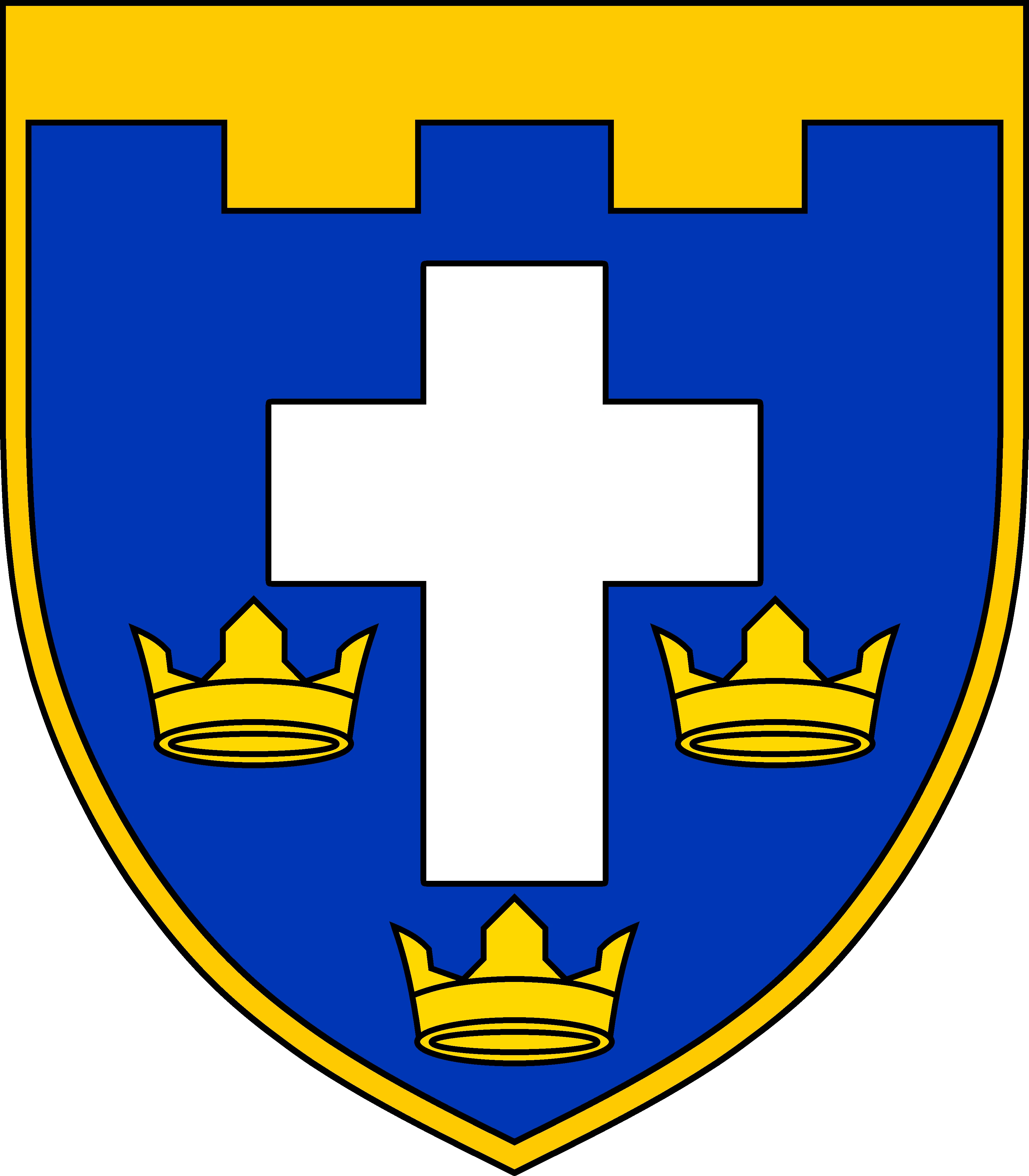
- 124th Brigade (2018 – 2024)

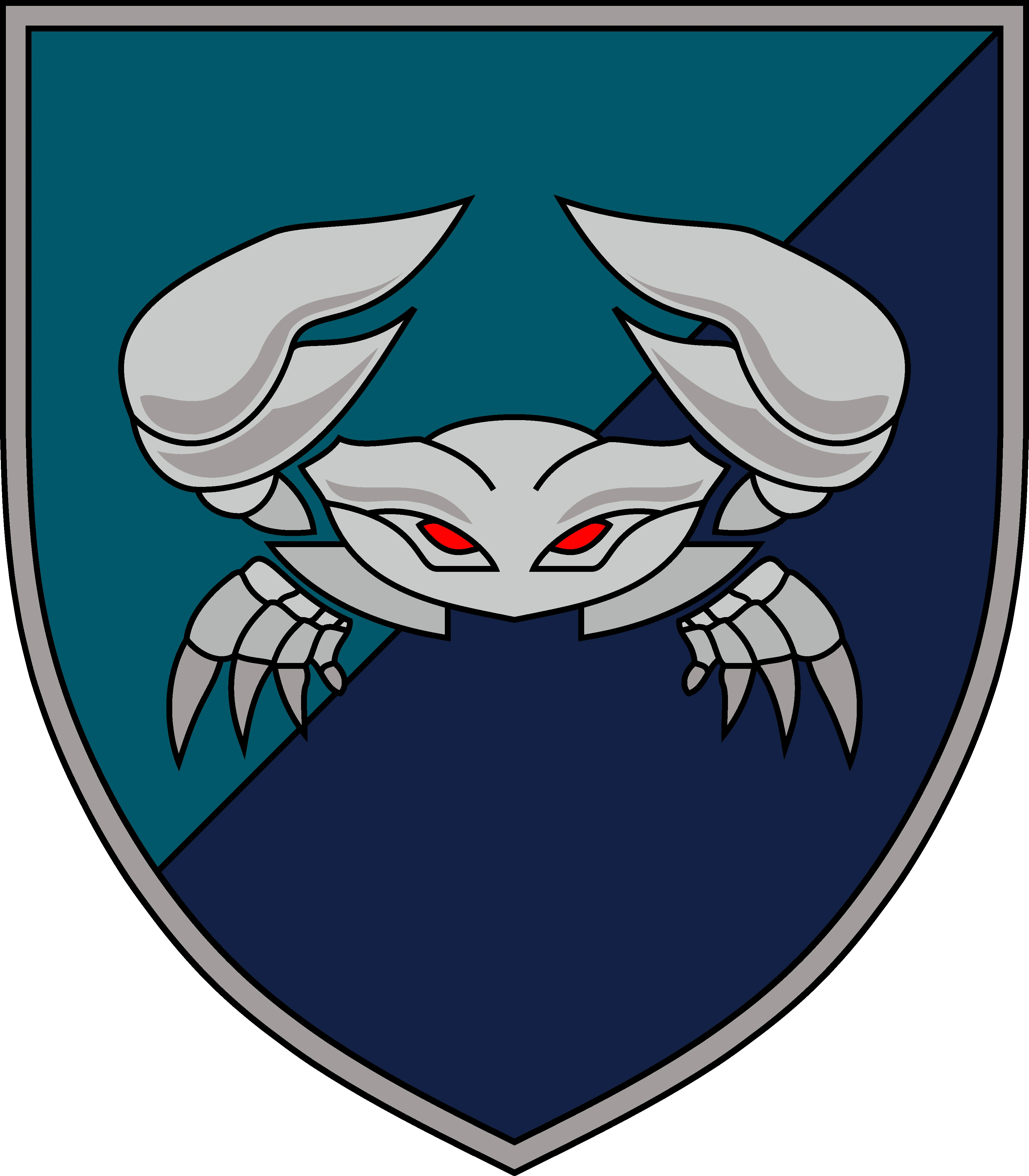
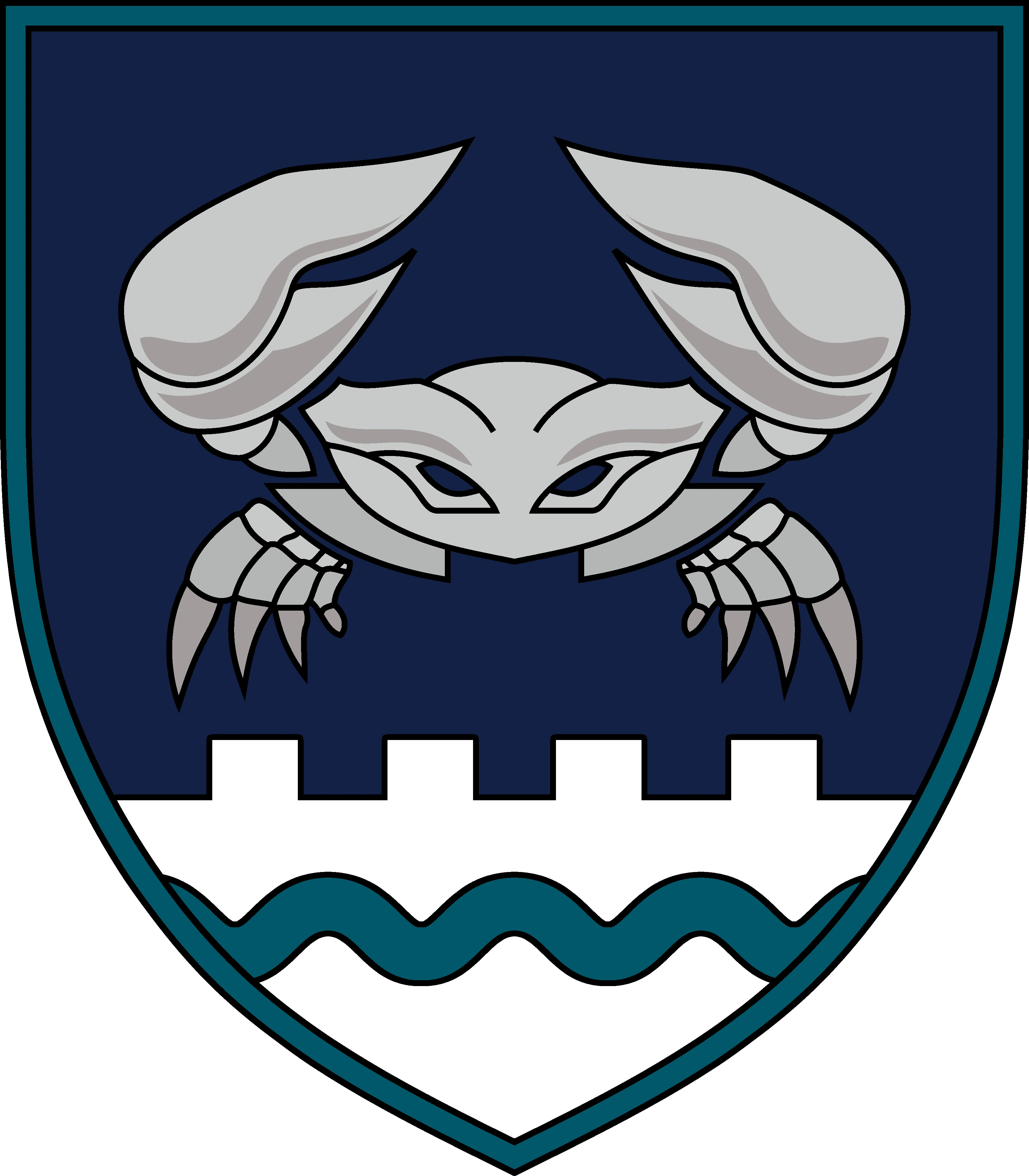
- 34th Coastal Defense Brigade (2024 – 2026)

The 34th Separate Marine Brigade "Borysfen" (MUN А7053), formerly the 124th Territorial Defense Brigade, is a unit of the Ukrainian Marine Corps in Kherson. The brigade was a former Territorial Defense Brigade until being transferred to the Ukrainian Marine Corps.

== History ==
=== Formation ===
On 30 June 2018, the 124th Territorial Defense Brigade was formed in Kherson Oblast. From September 3 to 12, 2018, brigade-wide training exercises were held, involving close to 3,500 reservists up to sixty years old. Exercises were held in Bilozerka Raion, Oleshky Raion, Henichesk Raion, Ivanivka Raion, and Skadovsk Raion. Each battalion only had two contract permanent officers, commander and chief of staff, with everyone else being a reservist. A battalion stationed in Oleshky took 300 of its reservists from Oleshky Raion, Kakhovka Raion and Novovorontsovka Raion. The 195th Territorial Defense Battalion had 290 reservists, including 41 officers from Oleshky Raion, Hola Prystan Raion and Skadovsk Raion. The 197th Territorial Defense Battalion was stationed on the Arabat Spit, and after September 7, began joint patrols with the State Border Guard Service of Ukraine and guarding of critical infrastructure in Henichesk Raion. From 5 to 15 December, another exercise was held. Kherson Oblast governor Andrii Gordieiev gave awards to members of the 193rd Territorial Defense Battalion for their participation in the exercise.

Between September 19 and 26, 2020, the 196th Territorial Defense battalion took part in another exercise.

Another exercise was held from April 7 to 16, 2021, at the cost of two and a half million hryvnia.

The 197th Territorial Defense Battalion had 70% of its contract positions filled by 16 February 2022. However, this specific battalion had insufficient living conditions. Later, a new base was founded in Henichesk.

=== Russo-Ukrainian War ===
Russian invasion of Ukraine

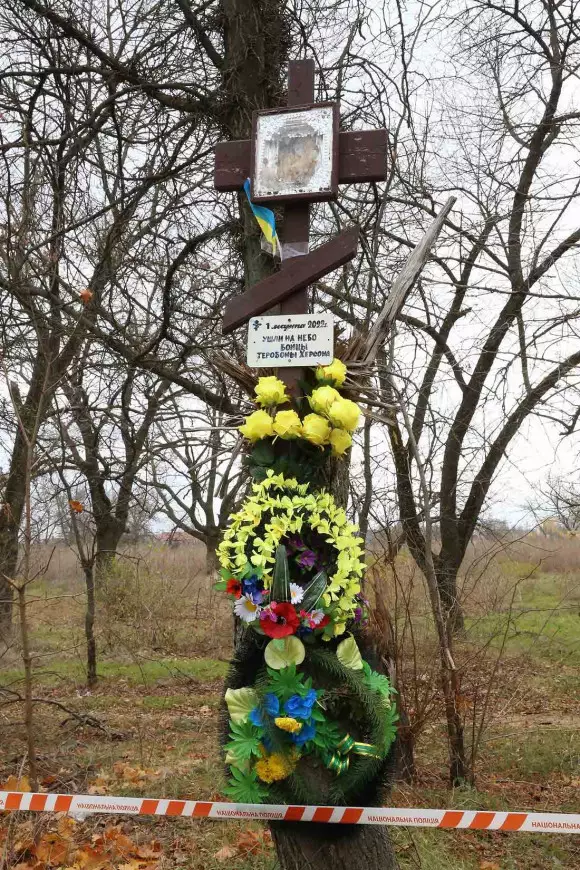
A memorial to killed Kherson Territorial Defense soldiers in Lilac Park, Kherson.

On February 24, Ihor Likhnov, the commander of the 192nd Territorial Defense Battalion, took a few hundred volunteers and began the defense of Kherson. Their first battle was for Antonivka Road Bridge, where the battalion covered the retreat for regular army units. On March 1, one of its companies fought against a Russian tank company. After Kherson was captured, a portion of the battalion remained in the city. Some of those who remained were captured. Likhnov later began to rebuild the battalion with 13 soldiers, and eventually turned into a fully-fledged combat unit which fought in Donetsk Oblast and in Kherson Oblast.

Also, on 1 March, around 40 members of 194th Territorial Defense Battalion took part in the battles of Buzkovyi Park (Lilac Park) where they suffered heavy casualties after being ambushed by a Russian armoured column instead of an expected infantry column. The unit was armed with rifles, grenades, a small amount of RPGs and self-made Molotov cocktails. At least 24 Ukrainian soldiers were killed and others were wounded, with the Russians suffering at least one KIA. The fallen servicemen were buried in the park by locals and a memorial was unveiled there on the first anniversary of the battle in March 2023. Lieutenant Colonel Dmytro Ishchenko was ordered to move to Mykolaiv in May.

In May and June 2022, the brigade's 196th Battalion held the defense on the borders of Mykolaiv Oblast and Kherson Oblast, near the villages of Lupareve, Oleksandrivka, Nova Zoria and Tavriiske. Simultaneously, also in May 2022, the brigade's 197th Battalion took part in operations in the Zaporizhzhia Oblast, in support of the 81st Airmobile Brigade near Huliaipole and the 128th Mountain Assault Brigade near Zarichne, Komyshuvakha and Mali Shcherbaky.

The unit's 192nd Battalion took part in a major Ukrainian offensive in the Kharkiv Oblast in September 2022. It was operating near the village of Semenivka, where it reportedly captured a group of Russian soldiers and a large amount of munitions on 10 September.

In January 2023, the 197th Battalion was deployed to several positions near Kherson, including Chornobaivka and Naddniprianske, to counter the threat of a Russian breakthrough across the Dnieper River. The 196th Battalion also defended the city of Kherson during January 2023.

On April 16, 2023, the 193rd Territorial Defense Battalion together in coordination with other units destroyed a Russian ammo depot on the left bank of the Dnipro river. On 7 June, units of the brigade took part in the evacuation of civilians following the destruction of the Kakhovka Dam.

On 1 February 2025, the 124th Territorial Defense Brigade was transformed into the 34th Coastal Defense Brigade.

In early 2026 the unit was reorganized and renamed. The 34th Coastal Defense Brigade therefore becoming the 34th Marine Brigade.

The Marines patrol Kherson on foot shooting down drones attacking the city.In May the Marines patroled what they call the "kill zone", an area that is 500 to 600 meters from Russian positions across the Dnipro. For this effort, On 23 May 2026, the Day of the Marine Corps of Ukraine, the brigade was awarded the honorary title "Borysfen" by decree of President Volodymyr Zelenskyy.

In June of 2026 Dmytro Pulinets, Commander of the 34th Separate Marine Brigade, noted in a radio interview that the Marines had taken control of the islands between Oleshky and Kherson and had cleared the town of Oleshky. Pulinets noted that the unit had established on the left bank (east) of the Dnipro River. As the Marines were clearing islands they captured Russian prisoners, including soldiers orderd to fight with shovels and the great-grandson of the CPSU Central Committee General Secretary Leonid Brezhnev

== Structure ==
=== 2022 ===
As of 2022, the 124th Territorial Defense Brigade's known structure was as follows:

- 124th Territorial Defense Brigade
  - Brigade Headquarters
    - Management
    - Commandant Platoon
  - 192nd Territorial Defense Battalion (Kherson) MUN А7358
  - 193rd Territorial Defense Battalion (Beryslav) MUN А7359
  - 194th Territorial Defense Battalion (Bilozerka) MUN А7360
  - 195th Territorial Defense Battalion (Skadovsk) MUN А7361
  - 196th Territorial Defense Battalion (Nova Kakhovka) MUN А7362
  - 197th Territorial Defense Battalion (Henichesk) MUN А7363
  - Mortar Battery
  - Combat Engineer Company
  - Logistic Company
  - Signal Company

=== Current ===
As of 2025, the 34th Coastal Defense Brigade's known structure is as follows:

- 34th Coastal Defense Brigade
  - Brigade Headquarters
    - Management
    - Commandant Platoon
  - 1st Coastal Defense Battalion. Commander: Ihor "Dnipro".
    - 1st Coastal Defense Company
    - 2nd Coastal Defense Company
    - 3rd Coastal Defense Company
    - Fire Support Company
    - Reconnaissance Platoon
  - 2nd Coastal Defense Battalion
  - 3rd Coastal Defense Battalion
  - 4th Coastal Defense Battalion
  - Landing Support Company
  - Artillery Group
  - Reconnaissance Company
  - Engineer Support Group
    - Engineer-Sapper Company "Karlson"
  - Medical Company
  - Recruitment Department. Commander: Maj. Ihor Lankratov

== Equipment ==
- D-20 – Soviet towed howitzer

== Commanders ==
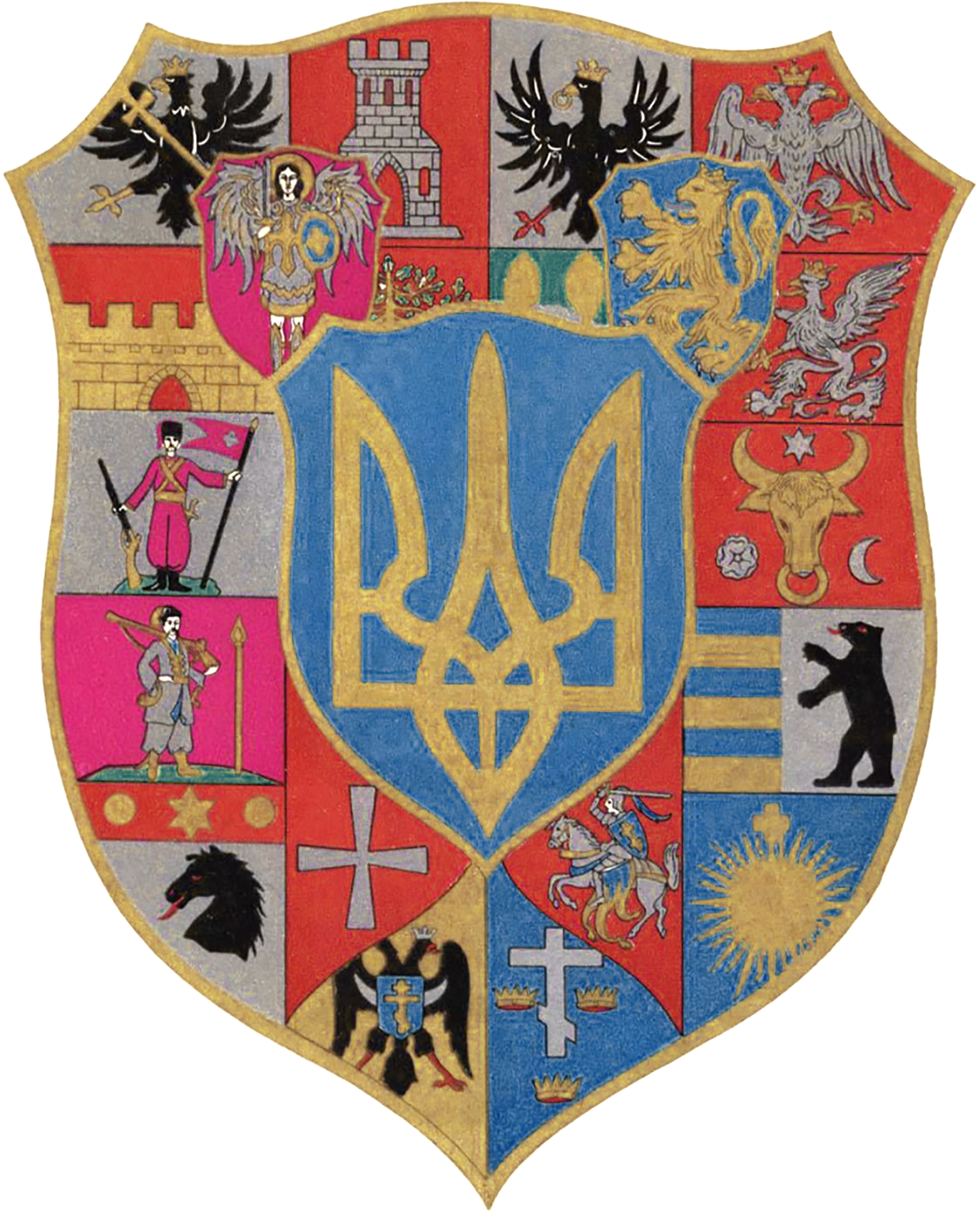
A proposed greater coat of arms of the Ukrainian People's Republic, showing the proposed coat of arms of Kherson region.

- Lieutenant Colonel Dmytro Ishchenko (2018 – ?)
- Lieutenant Colonel Oleksandr Mostovyi (? – ?)
- Lieutenant Colonel Dmytro Pulinets (? – present)

== Insignia ==
The 124th Territorial Defense Brigade's insignia shows a silver cross with three gold crowns on a blue field, which was a proposed coat of arms for Kherson region in the Ukrainian People's Republic.

== See also ==
- Territorial Defense Forces of the Armed Forces of Ukraine
- Marine Corps of the Armed Forces of Ukraine
