= Yakov Rezantsev =

Russian general

- Яков Владимирович Резанцев
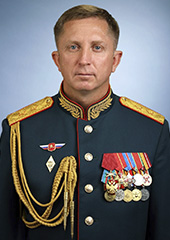
- Rezantsev in 2021
- Born: 17 June 1973 (age 53); Altai Krai, Russian SFSR, Soviet Union
- Military career
- Allegiance: Soviet Union; Russia
- Branch: Soviet Army; Russian Ground Forces
- Service years: 1990–present
- Rank: Lieutenant general
- Unit: 49th Combined Arms Army
- Conflicts: Syrian Civil War; Russo-Ukrainian War; Russian invasion of Ukraine; 2022 Chornobaivka attacks

Yakov Vladimirovich Rezantsev (Russian: Яков Владимирович Резанцев; 17 June 1973) is a Russian lieutenant general (two-star rank). Between 2020 and 2023, he commanded the 49th Army of the Southern Military District.

According to Ukrainian officials, he was killed in Chornobaivka near Kherson (Ukraine) during the 2022 Chornobaivka attacks of the Russian invasion of Ukraine; Russian sources have not confirmed his death.

== Biography ==
Yakov Rezantsev was born on 4 January 1973, in the village of Elbanka in the Ust-Pristansky District of Altai Krai.

He started his military service in 1990, graduating from the Far Eastern Higher Combined Arms Command School (1994), the Combined Arms Academy (2002) and the Military Academy of the General Staff (2008). He graduated from all military universities with gold medals.

He passed the main command positions from the commander of a platoon of cadets to the commander of a motorized rifle brigade.

From 2010 to 2011 he served as commander of the 57th Separate Guards Motorized Rifle Brigade. From 2011 to 2013 he was the commander of the 7th Military Base. In 2013 he was promoted to Major General. In 2018 he served as Chief of Staff of the 20th Guards Combined Arms Army of the Western Military District.

From 2018 to 2020, he was the commander of the 41st Combined Arms Army of the Central Military District (Novosibirsk). From October 2020 he served as the commander of the 49th Combined Arms Army of the Southern Military District (Stavropol).

In 2021, he was promoted to lieutenant general.

He was deployed in Russia's military intervention in Syria.

According to Ukrainian officials, he was killed at the Chornobaivka aerodrome in Chornobaivka near Kherson (Ukraine) during the 2022 Chornobaivka attacks of the Russian invasion of Ukraine; his death was confirmed by "a Western security source" but Russian sources had not confirmed his death as of 25 March. According to the Ukrainians, he would be Russia's seventh general officer to be killed in the invasion and one of the two most highly ranked casualties of the war.

The Nevinnomyssk mayor congratulated Rezantsev on his birthday on 17 June in a Telegram post.

== Awards ==
- Order of Military Merit (2020)
- Order of Merit for the Fatherland, IV degree
- Order of Alexander Nevsky
- Suvorov medal
- Medal "Participant of the military operation in Syria"
- Order of Courage "Afyrkhaharazy aorden" (December 8, 2016, Abkhazia) - for the exemplary performance of peacekeeping tasks to ensure the security and inviolability of the state border of the Republic of Abkhazia
- Medal "For military valor" (Abkhazia)
- Medal "For Combat Commonwealth" (Abkhazia)

== See also ==
- List of Russian generals killed during the Russian invasion of Ukraine

Military offices
Preceded by Mikhail Zusko	Commander of the 49th Combined Arms Army; 2020-	Succeeded by Killed In Action
Preceded by Aleksey Zavizon	Commander of the 41st Combined Arms Army; 2018–2022	Succeeded by Sergey Ryzhkov
Unknown	Chief of Staff of the 20th Guards Combined Arms Army; 2018	Unknown
Preceded by Sergey Chebotaryov	Commander of the 7th Military Base; 2011–2013	Succeeded by Mikhail Kosobokov
Unknown	Commander of the 57th Guards Motor Rifle Brigade; 2010–2011	Unknown
