= Sychevoi =

Sychevoi, also transliterated as Sychevoy (Russian: Сычевой) is a Russian surname. People with the surname include:

- Andrei Sychevoi (born 1969), Russian general
- Vladimir Pisarsky (born 1996 as Vladimir Sychevoi), Ukrainian-born Russian footballer
