= Vladimir Frolov (general) =

Russian major general (1967–2022)

- Владимир Петрович Фролов
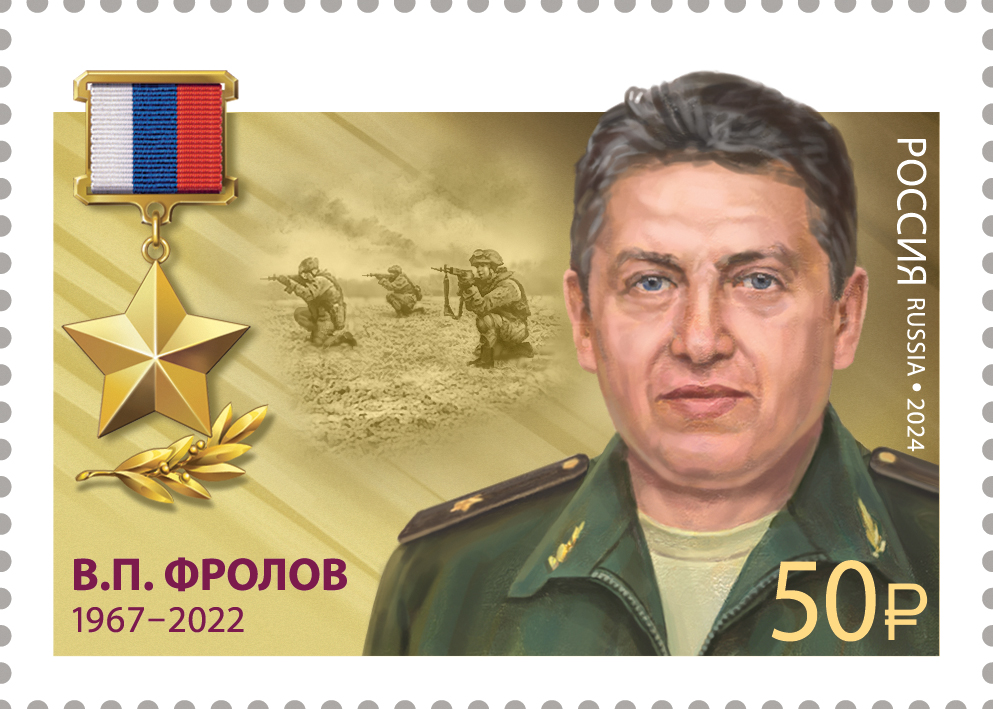
- Postage stamp of Frolov
- Born: Vladimir Petrovich Frolov; 6 February 1967; Leningrad, Soviet Union
- Died: 10 March 2022 (aged 55); Mariupol, Ukraine
- Military career
- Allegiance: Russia
- Branch: Russian Ground Forces
- Service years: 1988–2022
- Rank: Major general
- Commands: Deputy Commander, 8th Combined Arms Army
- Conflicts: Russo-Ukrainian War; Russian invasion of Ukraine †

Vladimir Petrovich Frolov (Russian: Владимир Петрович Фролов; 6 February 1967 – 10 March 2022) was a Russian major general who died during the Russian invasion of Ukraine.

== Biography ==
Vladimir Frolov was born into the family of a World War II veteran. He joined the Soviet Armed Forces in 1984, enrolling as a cadet of the Sverdlovsk Higher Military-Political Tank-Artillery School. He later graduated from the Combined Arms Academy of the Armed Forces of the Russian Federation and the Military Academy of the General Staff of the Armed Forces of Russia.

Frolov took part in the Russian intervention in the Syrian civil war, and was promoted to the rank of major general by Presidential Decree No. 595 of Vladimir Putin on 12 December 2019.

The 8th Combined Arms Army, whose deputy commander was Frolov, was actively engaged in the siege of Mariupol. According to the version of Speaker of the People's Council of the Donetsk People's Republic Artem Zhoga, Frolov was killed by a sniper on 10 March 2022 during fighting at the Illich Steel and Iron Works. He was buried in the ruins by Ukrainian troops. After the area was captured by Russian forces, Ukrainian prisoners of war notified Russian troops of Frolov's burial location.

His death was announced by Russian officials on 16 April 2022. The same day, his burial was held with military honours at Saint Petersburg's Serafimovskoe Cemetery after a funeral service in Novocherkassk's Ascension Cathedral. The ceremony was attended by the Governor of Saint Petersburg, Alexander Beglov.

== Awards ==
Frolov was posthumously awarded the title of Hero of the Russian Federation by decree of the President of Russia dated 25 December 2023. The gold star of the award was presented to Frolov's family by Alexander Beglov on 22 February 2024. Over his career Frolov had also been awarded the Order of Military Merit, the Order "For Merit to the Fatherland" second class with swords, and the Soviet Medal "For Battle Merit". He was also posthumously awarded the title of Hero of the Donetsk People's Republic.

== Memory ==
In September 2024, a bust of Frolov was installed in Mariupol; a municipal secondary school No. 4 was also named in his honor.

== See also ==
- List of Russian generals killed during the Russian invasion of Ukraine
