= Andrey Mordvichev =

Russian military officer (born 1976)

- Андрей Николаевич Мордвичёв
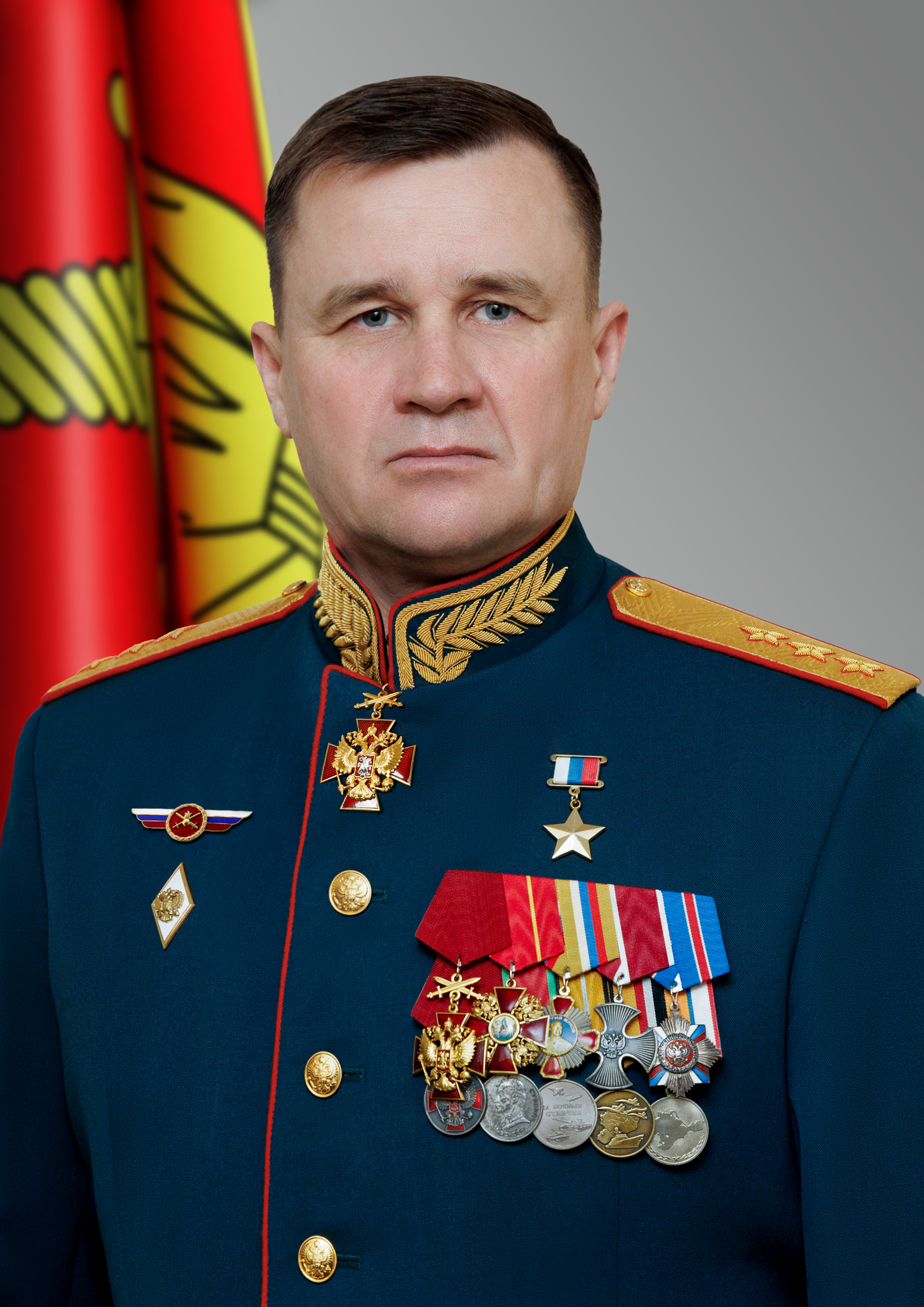
- Mordvichev in 2025
- Born: 14 January 1976 (age 50); Pavlodar, Kazakh SSR, Soviet Union
- Education: Novosibirsk Higher Military Command School; Combined Arms Academy of the Armed Forces; Russian General Staff Academy
- Military career
- Allegiance: Russia
- Branch: Russian Ground Forces
- Service years: 1997–present
- Rank: Colonel General
- Commands: Commander-in-Chief of the Russian Ground Forces; Central Military District; 8th Combined Arms Army; 28th Separate Motor Rifle Brigade; 7th Separate Guards Tank Brigade; 4th Separate Guards Tank Brigade
- Conflicts: Russo-Georgian War; Syrian civil war; Russian intervention; Russian-Ukrainian war; Siege of Mariupol; Battle of Avdiivka; Pokrovsk offensive
- Awards: Hero of the Russian Federation

Colonel General Andrey Nikolayevich Mordvichev (Russian: Андрей Николаевич Мордвичёв, born 14 January 1976) is a Russian military officer who has been the Commander-in-Chief of the Russian Ground Forces since 2025.

Mordvichev graduated from the Novosibirsk Higher Military Command School in 1997 and served in motor rifle units of the Russian Ground Forces. He later graduated from the Combined Arms Academy in 2006 and the General Staff Academy in 2016, and took part in the Russo-Georgian War and the Russian intervention in the Syrian civil war. Mordvichev commanded several brigades before commanding the 8th Combined Arms Army, which he led during the 2022 Russian invasion of Ukraine, most notably in the Siege of Mariupol.

Mordvichev was the deputy commander of the Southern Military District from 2022 to 2023. He then led the Central Military District and the Group of Forces "Center" in the Russo-Ukrainian war from 2023 to 2025, being in command during the Battle of Avdiivka. He was awarded the title Hero of the Russian Federation in 2024.

== Early life and education ==
Andrey Nikolayevich Mordvichev was born on 14 January 1976 in Pavlodar, Kazakh Soviet Socialist Republic, Soviet Union. He became the first member of his family to join the military, and graduated from the Novosibirsk Higher Military Command School in 1997.

== Military career ==
Mordvichev held commands in motorized rifle units at the platoon, company, and battalion level in the Russian Ground Forces before he graduated from the Combined Arms Academy in 2006. After that, he commanded the 1st Guards Motor Rifle Regiment of the 2nd Guards Motor Rifle Division. Mordvichev participated in the Russo-Georgian War in 2008.

From 2010 to 2011, as a lieutenant colonel, he was the deputy commander of the 5th Separate Guards Motor Rifle Brigade (formed on the basis of the 2nd Guards Motor Rifle Division as part of the 2008 Russian military reform). Mordvichev commanded the 4th Separate Guards Tank Brigade from April 2011. His later commands included the 7th Separate Guards Tank Brigade from 2012 and the 28th Separate Motor Rifle Brigade from 2013. Mordvichev was promoted to major general on 12 June 2013, at the unusually young age of 37.

After graduating from the Russian General Staff Academy in 2016, Mordvichev was appointed deputy commander of the 68th Army Corps and commander of the Yuzhno-Sakhalinsk garrison. He also participated in the Russian intervention in the Syrian civil war. In 2017 he was appointed chief of staff and first deputy commander of the 41st Combined Arms Army of the Central Military District. He became the chief of staff and first deputy commander of the 8th Combined Arms Army of the Southern Military District in 2019, and became the army's commander in 2021.

=== Russo-Ukrainian war ===
He commanded the 8th Combined Arms Army during the Russian invasion of Ukraine, where Ukrainian sources falsely claimed he was killed in an 18 March airstrike on an airfield in Chornobaivka. This would have made him Russia's sixth general to be killed in the invasion and the most highly ranked casualty of the war up to that point. However, Mordvichev's claimed death was not confirmed by Russian sources, and on 28 March, Russian television broadcast images that showed Ramzan Kadyrov meeting Mordvichev in Mariupol.

Mordvichev led Russian forces in the Siege of Mariupol, from February to May 2022, as a lieutenant general. During that time, he was reportedly injured and was away from the from the front line for several weeks. For his achievements here he was awarded the title Hero of the Russian Federation in 2024. Later in 2022, Mordvichev was named deputy commander of the Southern Military District. From 17 February 2023, he commanded Russia's Central Military District, having replaced the promoted Colonel-General Aleksandr Lapin due to the previous territorial losses during the 2022 Kharkiv counteroffensive. As of April 2023 he was commander of the Center Grouping of Forces in Ukraine. On September 7, Mordvichev was promoted to colonel general by a presidential decree. According to an interview he gave at the end of July 2023 with the state-run Russia-1 television channel, Mordvichev views the invasion of Ukraine as a mere "stepping stone" to further conflict with Eastern Europe.

In February 2024, Mordvichev was congratulated by President Vladimir Putin for capturing Avdiivka as the Russian commander-in-charge of the Battle of Avdiivka. He led forces during the battle, starting from October 2023, which resulted in the front line being moved away from Donetsk.

=== Ground Forces commander ===
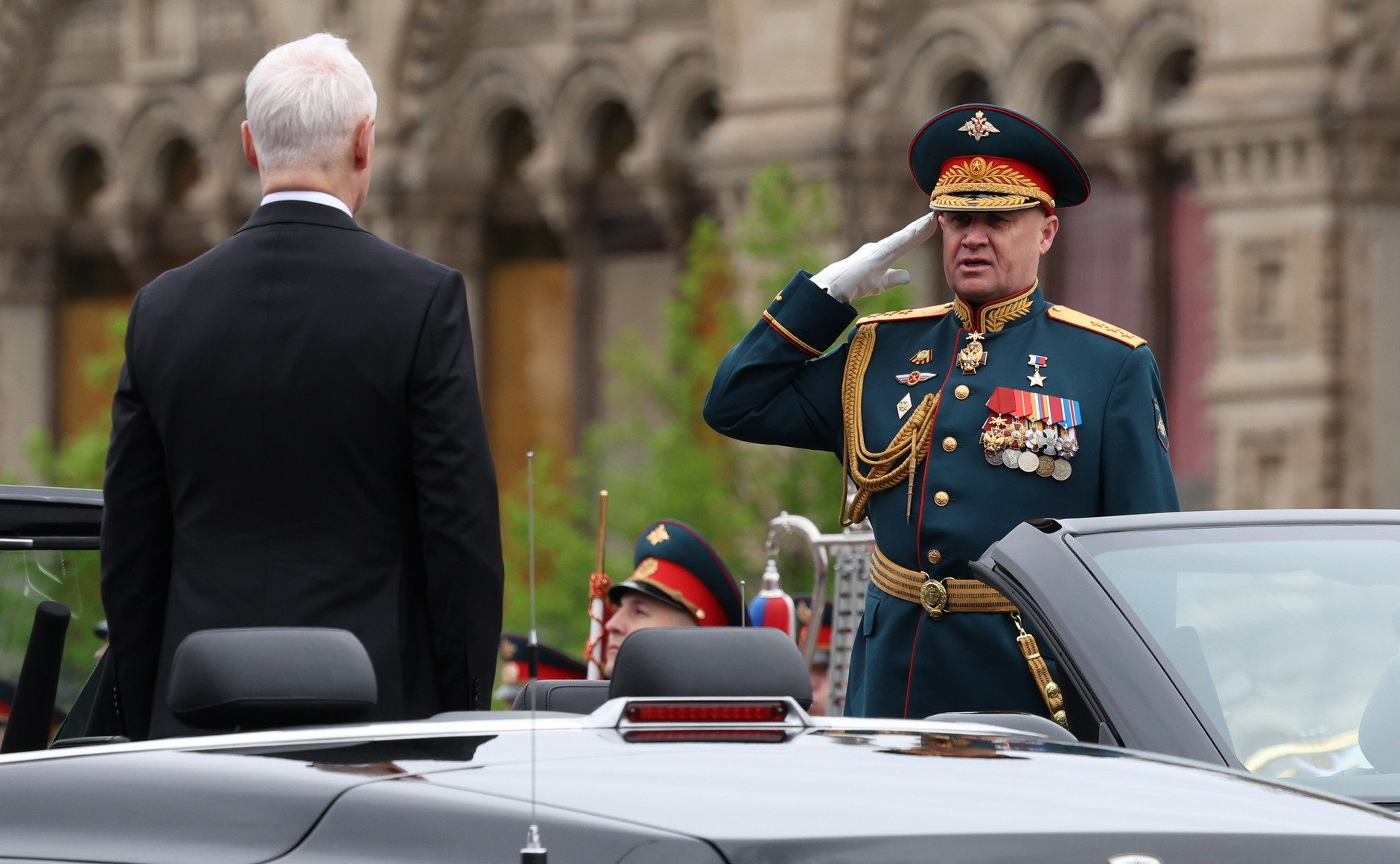
Mordvichev during the 2026 Moscow Victory Day Parade

In May 2025, he was appointed as the Commander-in-Chief of the Russian Ground Forces in place of Oleg Salyukov when the latter reached the age of retirement. Mordvichev was 49 at the time of his appointment, making him the youngest head of the Russian or Soviet ground forces since just after World War II. He was introduced to his new troops by Russian Defense Minister Andrey Belousov.

In May 2026, he commanded the 2026 Moscow Victory Day Parade.

== Awards and decorations ==
Mordvichev has received the following decorations:

- Hero of the Russian Federation
- Order of Alexander Nevsky
- Order of Zhukov
- Order of Courage
- Order of Military Merit
- Medal of the Order "For Merit to the Fatherland", 2nd class
- Medal of Suvorov

== Personal life ==
Mordvichev is married to a journalist and has several children.

Military offices
Preceded by Andrei Sychevoi	Commander of the 8th Combined Arms Army; 2021–2022	Succeeded by Gennady Anashkin
Preceded by Aleksandr Linkov; Acting	Commander of the Central Military District; 2023–2025	Succeeded by Valery Solodchuk
Preceded by Oleg Salyukov	Commander-in-Chief of the Russian Ground Forces; 2025–present	Incumbent
