= 2022 Chornobaivka attacks =

Military attacks in Chornobaivka during the Russian invasion of Ukraine

- Part of the southern front of the Russo-Ukrainian war
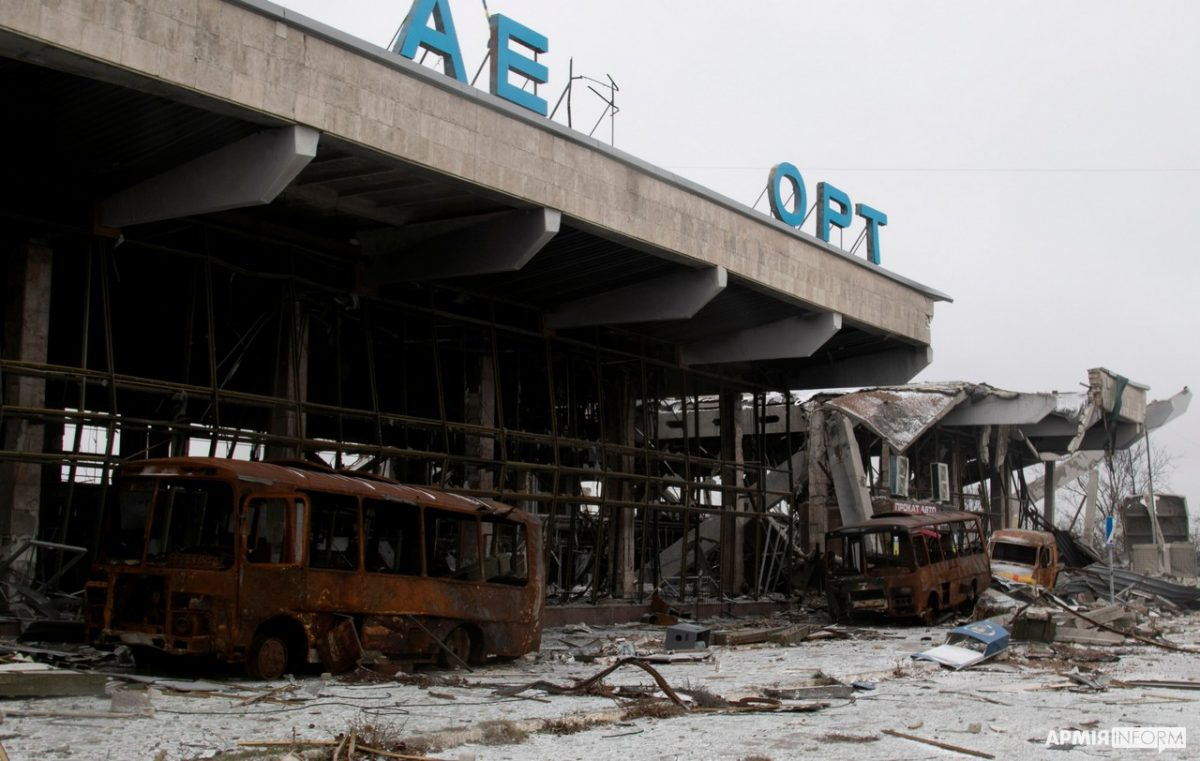
- The Kherson International Airport in Chornobaivka after the Russian withdrawal from the village
Date	Sporadic attacks from 27 February to 5 November 2022
Location	Kherson International Airport, Chornobaivka, Kherson Oblast, Ukraine
Result	Ukraine successfully carried out dozens of attacks against Russian forces, causing heavy casualties and equipment losses.

Belligerents
Russia	Ukraine

Units involved
Russian Armed Forces: 8th Combined Arms Army; 22nd Army Corps; 49th Combined Arms Army; 76th Guards Air Assault Division; 247th Guards Air Assault Regiment	Armed Forces of Ukraine: 28th Mechanized Brigade; 30th Mechanized Brigade

Strength
Several military helicopters	Bayraktar TB2 combat drones, mortars and Uragan and HIMARS multiple rocket launchers

Casualties and losses
Per Ukraine: 2 generals killed (Note: Andrey Mordvichev and Yakov Rezantsev. Both survived.); Dozens of helicopters and other military equipment 75 soldiers killed (15 May attack only)	Per Russia: 1 drone and 5 missiles shot down

A series of Ukrainian attacks against the Russian-held Kherson International Airport in Chornobaivka began on 27 February 2022, during the southern front of the Russo-Ukrainian war. Chornobaivka, located in Ukraine's Kherson Oblast, saw dozens of attacks on Russian positions by the Ukrainian Armed Forces following a bombing and takeover by the Russian Armed Forces of the town's airport.

According to Ukraine, these attacks resulted in the death of the Russian general Yakov Rezantsev of the 49th Combined Arms Army on 24 March. Russian general Andrey Mordvichev of the 8th Combined Arms Army was also reported killed in an attack on 18 March, but was later confirmed to still be alive. The deaths of many Russian soldiers and the destruction of their accompanying military equipment due to the attacks at the locality were also reported. Amid Russia's heavy purported losses, memes on Ukrainian social media appeared mocking Russia's losses in Chornobaivka. Chornobaivka became a popular phenomenon in general Ukrainian society.

Ukrainian attacks against the Russian army at Chornobaivka continued up to 5 November, four days before the announced Russian withdrawal from the area. Chornobaivka was liberated by the Ukrainian Armed Forces on 11 November, putting an end to the Russian occupation of its airport.

== Background ==
Chornobaivka is a small town in the Kherson Oblast in Ukraine. It is a gateway to the city of Kherson and its control gives strategic and tactical advantage in the event of a hypothetical attack on Mykolaiv. This is mainly due to the airport located there, which the Russian Armed Forces intended to use as a landing point during the Russian invasion of Ukraine. This is why Alexander Lemenov, a Ukrainian analyst, defined Chornobaivka as one of Russia's military targets during its war with Ukraine.

On 24 February 2022, the first day of the Russian invasion of Ukraine, Russia bombed six airports in Ukraine, including the Kherson International Airport at Chornobaivka.

== Attacks ==
=== Initial attacks (27 February – 16 March) ===
On the morning of 27 February, Russian forces took control of the airport. On the same day, Chornobaivka saw its first Ukrainian attack against Russian forces. The Ukrainian forces bombarded the Russian military with Turkish-made Bayraktar TB2 combat drones. The Ukrainian military released a video of the drones carrying out airstrikes on Russian positions, the first footage of Bayraktar drones in action since the beginning of the war. This event occurred on the second anniversary of the 2020 Balyun airstrikes by the Russian army that killed 34 Turkish soldiers in Syria. The Turkish embassy in Kyiv described the airstrikes at Chornobaivka as "revenge" for the 2020 Baylun incident and declared that "there is such a thing as divine justice".

On 2 March, Governor of Mykolaiv Oblast Vitaliy Kim announced another successful Ukrainian attack against Russian forces in Chornobaivka. Afterwards, on 7 March, the Ukrainian military claimed the destruction of 30 Russian military helicopters that had been stationed at the airport, as well other Russian equipment and manpower. On 15 March, Ukraine inflicted another attack on Russian forces in Chornobaivka. Kim reported that as a result, Russian soldiers fled to the suburbs of the then-Russian-occupied Kherson. On 16 March, Ukrainian forces once again shelled the Russian-controlled airport, destroying seven to fifteen military helicopters. The Wall Street Journal reported that "Ukraine carried out an airstrike on the Kherson airport, which is now a Russian airbase, and satellite imagery of the tarmac showed seven destroyed or damaged Russian helicopters, some of them engulfed in flames".

=== Continuation and reported death of two Russian generals (18 – 24 March) ===
On 18 March, a new Ukrainian attack on Chornobaivka targeted the position of the 8th Combined Arms Army, allegedly killing its commander, lieutenant general Andrey Mordvichev. Russian sources did not confirm his death and on 28 March, footage appeared showing Ramzan Kadyrov, Head of the Chechen Republic, meeting with Mordvichev and other commanders in Mariupol. Later, BBC News Russian confirmed Mordvichev was still alive. On 19 March, the next day, Ukraine again attacked Russian forces at Chornobaivka. Oleksiy Arestovych, adviser to the Office of the President of Ukraine, stated "Simply do not laugh. We caught them again in Chornobaivka. For the sixth time." Two days later, on 21 March, Ukrainian forces again attacked the airport, which Arestovych announced by saying "Get together. Now you will need all your courage. Chornobaivka. The seventh time." Satellite images obtained from Planet Labs by The New York Times showed that, as a result of continuous attacks, between 15 and 21 March, Russia had withdrawn most of its helicopters from Chornobaivka's airport to other airfields, although it still had ground units present at the airbase.

The Russians were again attacked at the airport of Chornobaivka by Ukraine on 22 March, suffering casualties and equipment loss. Arestovych explained the incidents in the town by stating that Russian helicopters going from Crimea to Ukraine were seeing themselves being forced to use the airport of Chornobaivka to land due to a lack of alternatives for amassing troops on the area. However, as a result of Ukraine's flat terrain, Ukrainian forces were capable of easily attacking the Russian forces at Chornobaivka. The ninth incident in Chornobaivka took place on 23 March amid a new Ukrainian attack at the airport. Arestovych this time said that the Russian equipment that had been stored on it was less numerous than before. The following day, on 24 March, the Ukrainian army again attacked the Russian military at Chornobaivka. Arestovych said that, immediately after the Ukrainian attack, there was a big movement of troops over the nearby Antonovskiy Bridge, for which he claimed that the Russian troops had fled away. It was also claimed that a second Russian general was killed on Chornobaivka during this attack. If confirmed, the Ukrainian army would have killed lieutenant general Yakov Rezantsev, commander of the 49th Combined Arms Army.

=== Spring attacks (27 March – 29 May) ===
On 27 March, the eleventh Ukrainian attack on Russians at Chornobaivka was reported by Arestovych. On 28 March, Arestovych announced that a twelfth Ukrainian attack on the Chornobaivka airport had occurred. On this day as well, Russia reported it had shot down one drone and five missiles of Ukraine at Chornobaivka. The thirteenth Ukrainian attack on Chornobaivka was on 1 April, as Arestovych reported. Kim also commented on the event, wishing Russian forces a happy April Fools' Day. On the same day, Russian soldiers were attacked again at Chornobaivka for the fourteenth time. Arestovych stated that, with the thirteenth and fourteenth attacks, the Ukrainian Armed Forces had managed to destroy an entire battalion of Russian forces in the town. On 6 April, Ukraine's 28th Mechanized Brigade announced it had participated in the strikes against Russian positions in Chornobaivka three times up until that point, using Uragan multiple rocket launchers.

On 14 April, Arestovych reported that the fifteenth attack on Chornobaivka by the Ukrainian army had taken place, destroying ammunition depots of Russia's 22nd Army Corps. Arestovych later claimed that, on 17 April at night, the Ukrainian forces had again destroyed Russian military equipment stored in Chornobaivka's airport. He briefly announced on 24 April that the seventeenth Ukrainian strike on Russians in the town had occurred. Arestovych said that on 2 May, the Ukrainian army destroyed another Russian ammunition depot following another attack. It was carried out with mortars by soldiers of Ukraine's 30th Mechanized Brigade. The brigade said the strikes came from mortars recently added to its unit and that "uninvited guests" would now have less ammunition to bombard Ukrainian territory. On 13 May, there was a major campaign of 25 shellings against Russian positions at Chornobaivka. For three hours, attacks were carried out against Russian equipment depots as well as artillery and missile weapons and ammunition.

Arestovych announced the twentieth incident at Chornobaivka on 15 May. He said that the attack started at 12:00 and that it was still ongoing at the time of his report. The Operational Command South later said on its Facebook page that the attack had resulted in the death of 75 soldiers of the Russian army and in the destruction of almost 20 units of its military equipment. An ammunition depot and two maintenance workshops were also destroyed. The next day, on 16 May, the General Staff of the Ukrainian Armed Forces announced a new attack on Russian forces in Chornobaivka, which caused them losses in equipment and manpower. On 29 May, Arestovych announced a twenty-second incident in Chornobaivka. He said that Ukrainian forces fired on a Russian ammunition depot and that the attack lasted at least for an hour.

=== Resumption in summer (1 July – 26 August) ===
On 1 July, the Ukrainian forces struck the Russians at Chornobaivka for the twenty-third time, destroying one of their ammunition depots. On 3 July, the Operational Command South reported that Ukrainian forces had destroyed another Russian ammunition depot in Chornobaivka. A spokesman for the head of the Odesa Oblast Military Administration, Serhii Bratchuk, also mentioned the event. On 7 July, Arestovych reported that at 14:23, Ukraine destroyed another Russian ammunition depot at Chornobaivka, which stayed on fire and with its stored weapons still detonating for over an hour after the attack. This was the twenty-fifth such incident, which he celebrated. On 9 July, a new Ukrainian attack on Chornobaivka produced heavy losses to Russia after striking several Russian command posts. According to Arestovych, twelve Russian senior officers, more precisely colonels and generals, died as a result. Another ammunition depot and several dozen pieces of military equipment were also annihilated. On 13 July, another Russian ammunition depot was struck by Ukraine at Chornobaivka, as the Operational Command South communicated.

On 21 July, Bratchuk informed that another Russian ammunition depot was destroyed in Chornobaivka. The next day, he announced that a Russian military base had been destroyed in the locality. On 27 July, the Operational Command South confirmed the destruction of another Russian ammunition depot in Chornobaivka. On 28 July, another Russian ammunition depot was destroyed at Chornobaivka as Bratchuk reported. On 29 July, a Russian military base for the deployment of troops and military equipment was obliterated at Chornobaivka according to Arestovych. On 30 July, according to an unconfirmed report, a Russian military base in Chornobaivka was on fire; this information was later confirmed. On 2 August, the Operational Command South reported that Ukrainian missile and artillery units had hit a command post of the Russian 22nd Army Corps in Chornobaivka. On 3 August, Bratchuk said that another Russian military base was destroyed in Chornobaivka. On 5 August, Ukraine attacked two command posts of the 49th Combined Arms Army and the 76th Guards Air Assault Division in Chornobaivka.

On 20 August, a command post of the Russian 247th Guards Air Assault Regiment was attacked by Ukrainian forces with HIMARS multiple rocket launchers at Chornobaivka. Serhii Khlan, member of the Kherson Oblast Council, announced the destruction of more Russian ammunition as a result of the attack. He said that Russian forces were now trying to establish more ammunition depots with less ammunition stored in each, although Ukraine was still being able to target them. On 22 August, the Operational Command South reported that artillery and missile units of the Ukrainian army destroyed an ammunition depot and a command post of the 247th Guards Air Assault Regiment in Chornobaivka. On 26 August, another Russian ammunition depot at Chornobaivka was destroyed. Furthermore, according to preliminary information, a military base of the Russian forces was also attacked by the Ukrainian army.

=== Kherson counteroffensive and liberation of Chornobaivka (29 August – 11 November) ===
On 29 August, Ukraine launched a counteroffensive with the aim of liberating Kherson and Russian-occupied territory on the right bank of the Dnieper river, including Chornobaivka. The Ukrainian Armed Forces announced an information blackout regarding the counteroffensive. Still, explosions and smoke columns were reported throughout Kherson Oblast in the coming days, including in Chornobaivka on 30 August and again on 31 August. On 5 September, more explosions were reported on Chornobaivka, and a cluster of Russian military equipment was hit. More explosions and smoke columns around Chornobaivka were reported on 7 September, and another attack against Russian positions took place on 18 September. On 20 September, Ukrainian missile and artillery units struck Russian command and equipment posts in Chornobaivka. On 22 September, Ukrainian forces destroyed Russian anti-aircraft guns that had been firing in the direction of Snihurivka.

On 25 October, two explosions were reported at Chornobaivka. Satellite images from 27 October showed that Russian forces had withdrawn all their military equipment from the airport at Chornobaivka, the airport thus being empty for the first time since the beginning of the Russian occupation. However, this did not end Ukrainian attacks on Russian forces at Chornobaivka; Vladyslav Nazarov, spokesman of the Operational Command South, reported that on 3 November, Ukrainian forces hit Russian military equipment that Russian forces were trying to move to another deployment location. On 5 November, more explosions and another smoke column were reported at Chornobaivka. According to local residents, recently mobilised Russian soldiers were receiving training in Chornobaivka at the time.

On 9 November, Minister of Defence of Russia Sergei Shoigu announced that Russian troops would withdraw from the right bank of the Dnieper after a proposal from Russian general Sergey Surovikin to do so. Surovikin said the decision, which had not been easy to take, was adopted because Kherson could no longer be properly supplied by the Russian army and also to protect the lives of Russian soldiers. On 11 November, the Russian withdrawal from the right bank of the Dnieper was completed, and the Ukrainian Armed Forces entered Chornobaivka, as well as Kherson and other localities. The next day, Arestovych said that the Chornobaivka "series" had ended.

== Aftermath ==
Following the liberation of the right bank of the Dnieper, Russia started shelling localities in the area, including Chornobaivka. As Governor of Kherson Oblast Yaroslav Yanushevych informed, on 26 November, Chornobaivka was shelled by Russian forces, as a result of which a 10-year-old boy was injured and had to be taken to a hospital.

== In popular culture ==
Due to the large number of attacks Russian forces suffered at Chornobaivka, the settlement has been described as having reached a "legendary" status in Ukraine. On Ukrainian-language social media, a wave of memes appeared mocking the reported failures of Russia in Chornobaivka. The Ukrainian band Alcohol Ukulele composed a song in Kryvyi Rih about the events in Chornobaivka which was simply titled Chornobaivka (Чорнобаївка). On 8 September, the Chernihiv City Council discussed renaming certain streets of Chernihiv as part of the derussification process in Ukraine. It was proposed to rename Kovpaka Sydora Street to Chornobaivska Street after Chornobaivka of Kherson Oblast, which was approved on 27 October.

President of Ukraine Volodymyr Zelenskyy commented that "Ukrainian Chornobaivka will go down in the history of war" and that "this is a place where the Russian military, their commanders, have shown themselves completely... as they are—incompetent, able to simply drive their people to [their] slaughter".

== See also ==
- Bavovna
- List of Russian generals killed during the 2022 invasion of Ukraine
