= 28th Separate Motor Rifle Brigade =

Russian military brigade

28th Separate Simferopol Red Banner Order of Suvorov Motor Rifle Brigade named after S. Ordzhonikidze
- 28-я отдельная мотострелковая Симферопольская Краснознаменная ордена Суворова II-й степени бригада имени С. Орджоникидзе
- Active: 2009–2016
- Country: Russia
- Branch: Russian Ground Forces
- Type: Motorized infantry
- Part of: 20th Guards Army
- Garrison/HQ: Klintsy; MUN 61423
- Engagements: War in Donbas; Russian military intervention in Syria
- Decorations: Order of the Red Banner; Order of Suvorov
- Battle honours: Simferopol; Named after Sergo Ordzhonikidze

The 28th Separate Simferopol Red Banner Order of Suvorov Motor Rifle Brigade named after S. Ordzhonikidze (Russian: 28-я отдельная мотострелковая Симферопольская Краснознаменная ордена Суворова II-й степени бригада имени С. Орджоникидзе; Military Unit Number 61423) was a brigade of the Russian Ground Forces. The brigade was formed in 2009 from the 34th Motor Rifle Division. The brigade, originally based in Yekaterinburg, moved to Klintsy in 2016, where it became the 488th Motor Rifle Regiment of the 144th Guards Motor Rifle Division.

== History ==
On March 1, 2009, by decree No. 11/20/1/080 of the Commander of the Volga–Ural Military District, the 34th Motor Rifle Division was reorganized into a brigade with the same designation. The unit inherited the division's honorifics titles and orders. Besides Yekaterinburg, elements of the brigade were located in the settlements of Verkhnyaya Pyshma, Tyubuk, Chebarkul, and Karabash. On 2 March 2011, Colonel Dmitry Kasperovich became commander of the brigade. In 2013 he was succeeded by Major General Andrey Mordvichev.

In February 2015, the brigade took part in the War in Donbas acting within the Northern Operational Area. In September 2015, the brigade was involved in the large military exercise "Tsentr-2015". Colonel Ramil Gilyazov commanded the brigade at the time. In December 2015, the Chief Directorate of Intelligence of the Ministry of Defence of Ukraine reported that elements of the brigade had deployed to Syria.

In June 2016, the brigade began relocation to Klintsy, close to Russia's border with Belarus and Ukraine. It became part of the 20th Guards Army there. After relocating to Klintsy, the brigade was reorganized into the 488th Motor Rifle Regiment of the 144th Guards Motor Rifle Division, which inherited the traditions of the 34th Motor Rifle Division.
