= Kherson River Port =

Coordinates: 46°37′31″N 32°36′34″E

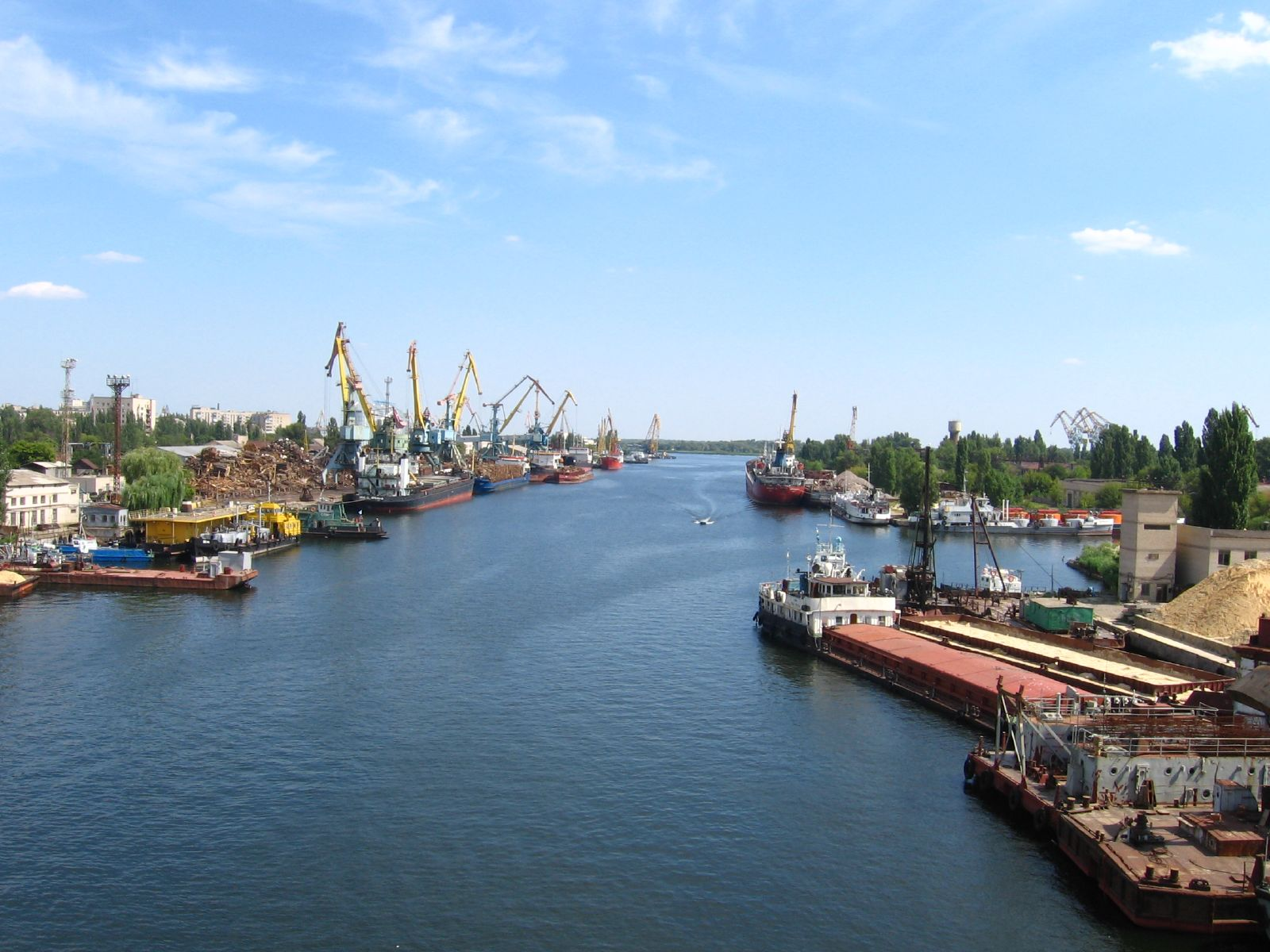
- Kherson River Port on the left side
- Click on the map for a fullscreen view
- Native name: Херсонський річковий порт

Location
- Country: Ukraine
- Location: 6 Odesa Square, Kherson

Details
- No. of berths: 7
- Draft depth: 7.8 metres

Statistics
- Annual cargo tonnage: 1.5 million tons (capacity)
- Website ukrrichflot.ua/ua/

Kherson River Port (Ukrainian: Херсонський річковий порт) is a large transport hub in Kherson where river, sea, rail and road transport interconnect. It is on the left bank of the Koshevaya or Koshova river, leading up to where it enters the Dnieper river. It has seven ship berths along 950 metres of dock.

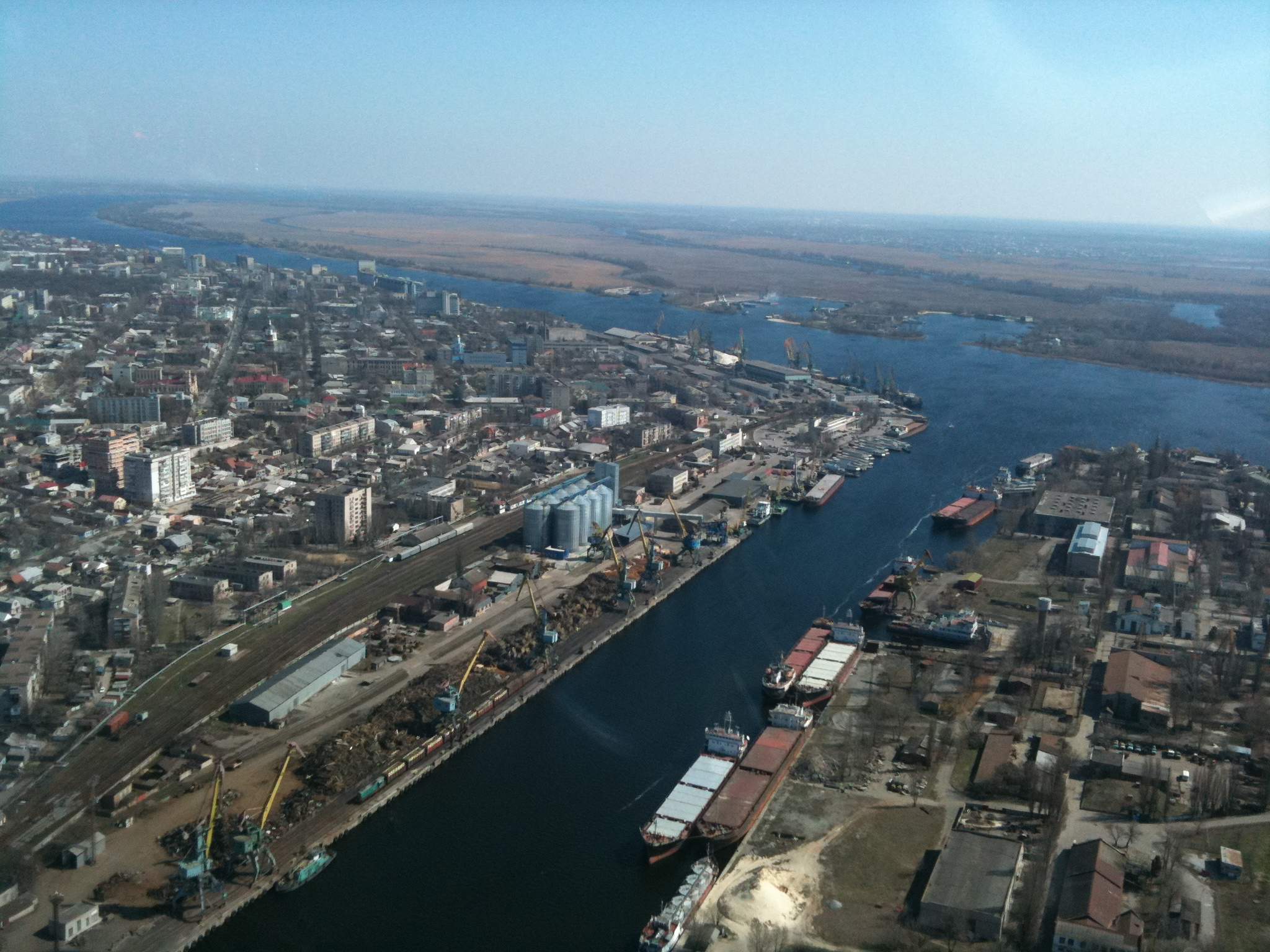
River port on left bank; passenger piers at far end

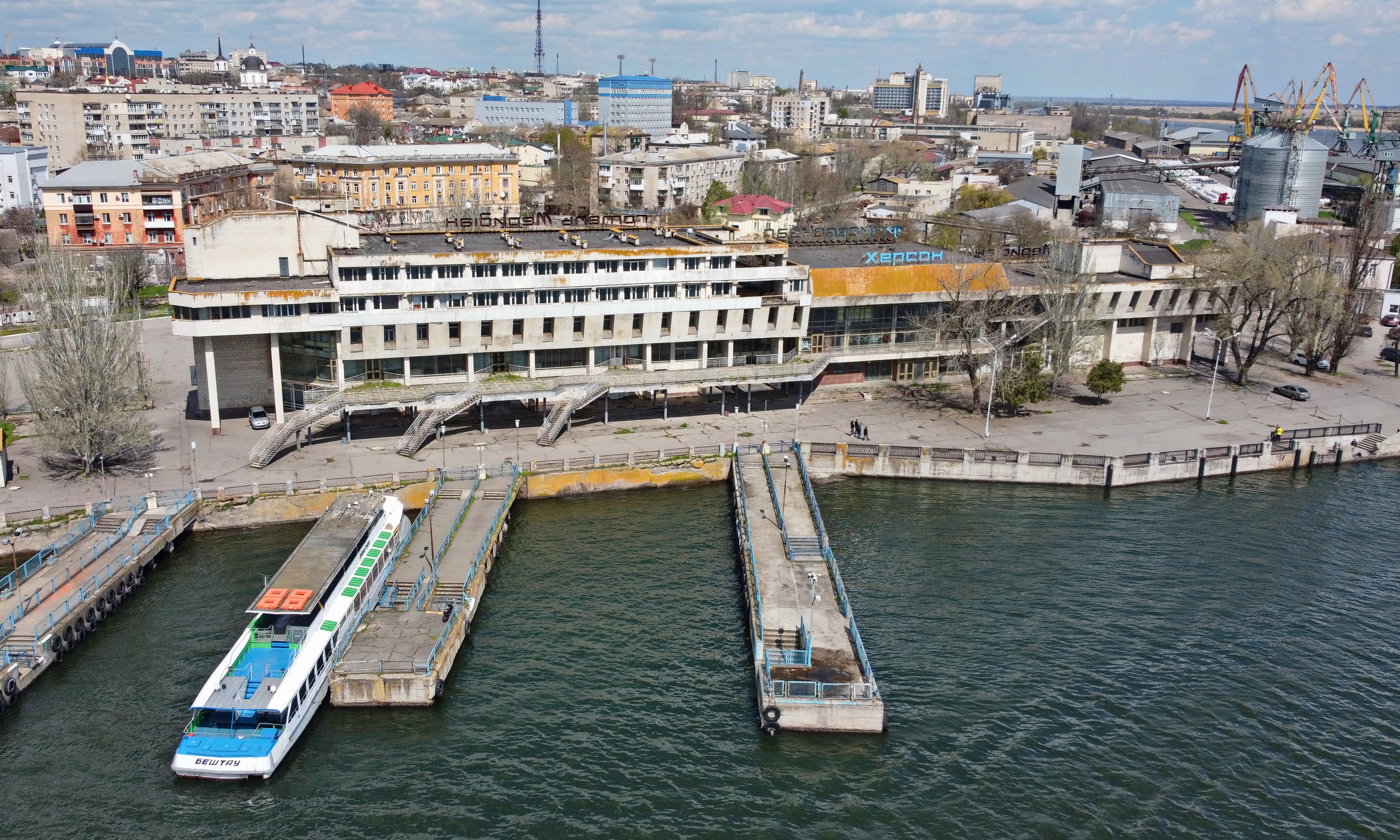
Passenger piers and terminal

Kherson River Port formed at the same time as Kherson town. The first shipment was received from the upper reaches of the Dnieper for those who were building Kherson fortress and the shipyard. In 1946 the Kherson river pier received its status of Kherson River Port. In the Soviet era, 9 to 11 million local and tourist passengers a year passed through the port; by 2016 the number had dropped to 1.2 million. In 1975–1985 the port handled up to 1.5 million tons of sand a year, but the sand quarrying had stopped by 2016. Since the 1980s it has handled bulk and general cargo, including rolled ferrous metal, timber, bauxite, scrap metal, coal, coke and mineral fertilizers. It was handling 33,000–35,000 tons a month, as of 2016.

== See also ==
- Battle of Kherson
- List of ports in Ukraine
- Cargo turnover of Ukrainian ports
