= Kherson Refinery =

Oil refinery in Ukraine

- Native name: Херсонський нафтопереробний завод
- Type: Business
- Industry: Oil refinery
- Founded: 1938
- Headquarters: Kherson, Street Naftovykiv, 52

Kherson Oil Refinery (OJSC "Kherson Refinery"; Ukrainian: ПрАТ «Херсонський НПЗ») is the third largest oil refinery in Ukraine, can annually process 7.1 million tons of oil as of 2005.

The refinery was built in 1938 after construction began in 1935. It was temporarily evacuated to Syzran during World War II, but was then reopened in Kherson in 1950. Following stages of construction in the 1950s and 1970s, the refinery peaked at a capacity of 8.5 million tonnes of crude oil in 1990. However, this sharply declined in the 1990s following the collapse of the Soviet Union, until eventually it was taken over by the Russian company Allilance Group alongside other Kazakhstani and Russian investors, and this turned around. In 2005, Alliance-Ukraine announced the plant would be shut down for reconstruction temporarily until 2010. However, the plant would never open again after this. Sometime after this, the Lutsk-based company Kontinuum took over the plant, and again it went into idleness with a series of reconstruction announcements, but has not seen production since 2005.

== History ==
Construction of the refinery began in 1935, with the first gasoline being produced in April 1938. According to the CIA, during 1937-1938, a small cracking plant designed for refining was put into operation for the refinery. At the start of World War II with Operation Barbarossa, the disassembled and moved to the eastern part of the Soviet Union to Syzran, where it remained until the end of the war. Between 1947 and 1950, the refinery was rebuilt in Kherson and put back into operation, with a second construction phase taking place in the 1950s and a third in the 1970s. A coking unit was additionally commissioned in 1970, a catalytic reforming unit in 1973, and two bitumen units in the 1960s. Products included straight-run and cracked gasolines, kerosene, diesel and fuel oils, coke, and asphaltic materials. In January 1972, a pipeline was put in place connecting Kremenchuk to Kherson, which allowed the crude oil throughput to increase by more than fourfold. The refinery operated six barracks, a cultural centre and two emergency buildings heated by hot steam. At peak capacity in 1990, it was processing 8.5 million tonnes of crude oil, but this amount fell sharply following the collapse of the Soviet Union to 1,562,700 by 1994.

As the 1990s went on, a steeper decline still continued, and by 1996 the average monthly throughput had fallen to 122,400 tonnes, which was below the 400,000 tonnes considered the minimum for the financial security of the refinery. Nearly 70% of the refinery's fixed assets were obsolete. Due to this, in March 1997, the State Property Fund of Ukraine announced that it was offering 61% of the refinery's shares via a tender. The rest of the shares would be held among the employees and the state. However, privatisation was delayed by Ukrnafta after they requested a freeze on the process. Eventually, though, the process was allowed, and a Russian company, Alliance Group, took control of the refinery alongside a consortium of Kazakhstani and Russian investors. Gradually, the plant's production improved going into the early 2000s.

In January 2005, the plant was scheduled for maintenance, but at the time, Alliance's division in Ukraine, Alliance-Ukraine, said this would not interrupt operations at the refinery. However, this was backtracked in August 2005 when the refinery was shut down for reconstruction, with plans to complete it by 2010. In preparation for the reconstruction of the Kherson refinery, in late 2006 and early 2007, CJSC Kherson Oil Refinery was established, founded by LLC Oil Company Alliance-Ukraine and OJSC Kherson Oil Refinery Complex. On 20 May 2009, according to the UNIAN news agency, CJSC Kherson Oil Refinery completed the first stage of production modernisation and was ready to start operating, but the launch of the enterprise was postponed indefinitely. It was later taken over by Kontinuum, a business based in Lutsk and associated with MP Ihor Yeremeyev sometime before 2009. In 2009, the Azerbaijani company SOCAR announced their intent to buy the refinery from Kontinuum, but this never happened.

In February 2011, Yeremeyev said the Chinese company Sinopec would help finance reconstruction alongside Kontinuum. The proposed reconstruction would take four years, which was later revised to two and a half years by 2012, and that it would require 2 billion in funds with the aim of transforming it into a petrochemical complex rather than a refinery. With the plant still being idle, upon the outbreak of the War in the Donbas in 2014, it was utilised by the Ukrainian government for civil defense and fire brigade training. An earlier 2013 analysis said the refinery was mothballed and that resumption would likely never begin again as it would cost billions. In 2017, the Kherson Oil Refinery was scheduled to be reconstructed again, as a result of which the company's capacity was to increase to 4.5 million tonnes of oil per year.

== See also ==
- List of oil refineries
