= Andrii Gordieiev =

Ukrainian politician

Andriy Gordieiev Андрій Анатолійович Гордєєв
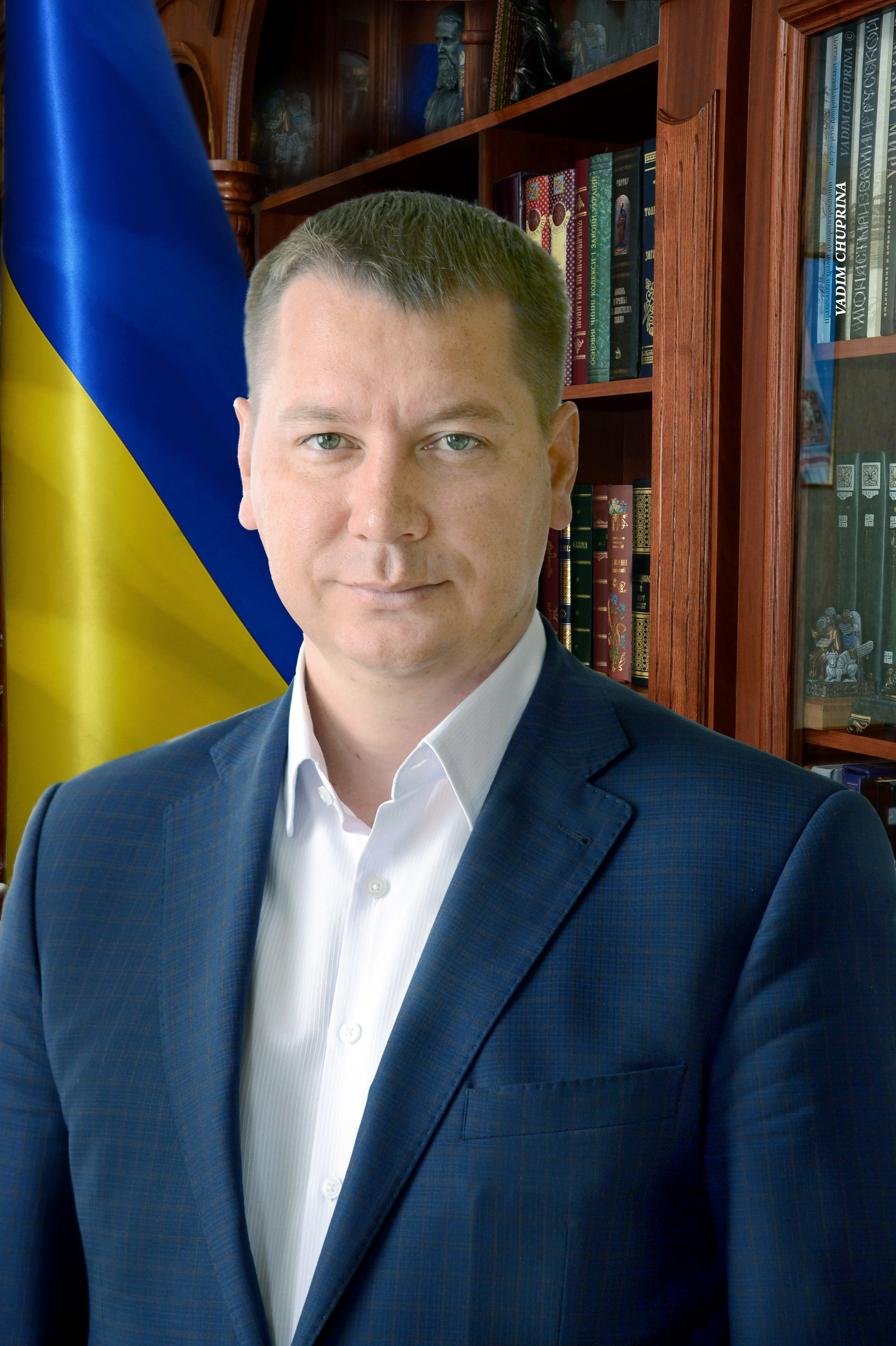

Governor of Kherson Oblast
- In office 28 April 2016 – 10 April 2019
- Preceded by: Andriy Putilov
- Succeeded by: Yurii Husiev

Personal details
- Born: 13 June 1983 (age 43) Nadiivka Village, Chaplynka Raion, Kherson Oblast, Ukrainian
- Education: Kyiv National Economic University

Andriy Anatoliyovych Gordeev (Ukrainian: Андрій Анатолійович Гордєєв; born on June 13, 1983, Nadiivka Village Chaplynka Raion, Kherson Oblast) is a Ukrainian politician, people's deputy of Ukraine of the VIIIth convocation, who was the Head of Kherson Oblast State Administration from April 2016 until April 2019.

== Bibliography ==
He was born on June 13, 1983, in Nadiivka Village Chaplynka Kherson Oblast. In 2000 he graduated from Tominobalkivska Secondary School I—III levels in Tomina Balka Village Bilozerka Raion Kherson Oblast. In 2003 he graduated from International University of Business and Law, the Faculty of Law. In 2007 he graduated from International Science-Technical University, the Faculty of Law. In 2009 he graduated from Kyiv National Economic University named after Vadym Hetman, the Faculty of Law; Master of Law; In 2014 he graduated from National Academy for Public Administration under the President of Ukraine, Master of Management of Society Development.

== Career ==
2003–2004 — a lawyer-consultant of Open joint-stock company "Plant «Delta»; 2004–2005 — a lawyer-consultant of Limited Liability Company «Mechanical Plant»; 2004 – 2012 — a leading lawyer-consultant, the head of Law Department Limited Liability Company «Mechanical Plant»; 2012 – 2014 — advisor-consultant of Ukraine's people's deputy; 2012 – 2015 — Kherson City Council Deputy of the 6th convocation; 2014 – 2016 — people's deputy of Ukraine; In April, 2016 – he was appointed the Head of Kherson Region State Administration. In accordance with the President's of Ukraine act dated from April 28, 2016, No. 178/2016.

Early April 2019 Gordieiev filed a resignation letter but did not specify the reasons why. The previous months activists had demanded from President Petro Poroshenko to dismiss Gordieiev because they considered him complicit in organizing the assassination of Kherson activist Kateryna Handziuk. According to Gordieiev he resigned prior to the second round of the 2019 Ukrainian presidential election so that the allegations "fabricated against him" should not affect the second round of the election. (President Poroshenko had won second place in the first round of the presidential election.) On 10 April the Cabinet of Ministers of Ukraine approved the dismissal.
