= Kherson International Airport =

Civil and military airport in Kherson Oblast, Ukraine

Kherson International Airport Міжнародний аеропорт «Херсон»

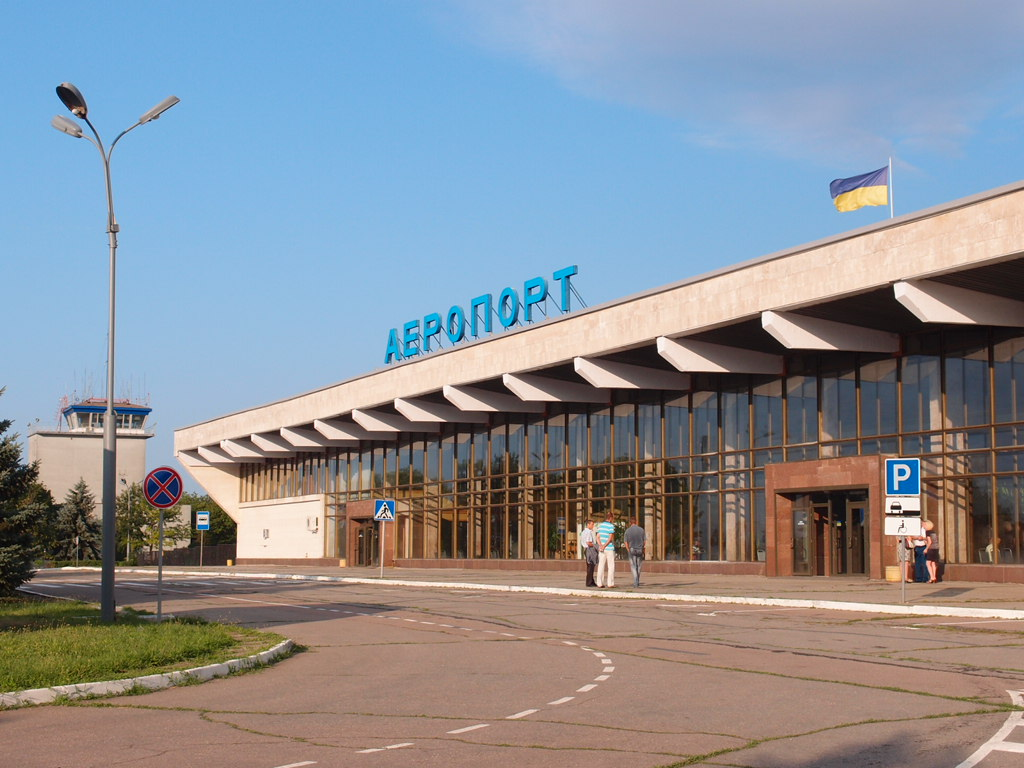
- IATA: KHE; ICAO: UKOH

Summary
- Airport type: Public/Military
- Operator: Kherson airlines
- Serves: Kherson, Mykolaiv
- Location: Chornobaivka, Kherson, Ukraine
- Elevation AMSL: 148 ft (45 m)
- Coordinates: 46°40′05″N 32°30′08″E
- Website: khe.aero

Maps
- Location of airport in Ukraine KHE (Ukraine)
- Interactive map of Kherson International Airport

Runways
| Direction | Length | | Surface |
| Direction | ft | m | Surface |
|---|---|---|---|
| 03/21 | 8,202 | 2,500 | Concrete |
| 03/21(unmarked) | 1,640.42 | 500 | Concrete |
| 03/21(unmarked) | 1,640.42 | 500 | Concrete |

Statistics (2021)
- Passengers: ▲83 553
- Source: cfts.org.ua

Kherson International Airport (Ukrainian: Міжнародний аеропорт Херсон, romanized: Mizhnarodnyi aeroport Kherson; IATA: KHE, ICAO: UKOH) is a civil and military airport serving the city of Kherson, Ukraine. It is located at Chornobaivka, in Kherson Oblast, on the northwest outskirts of the city of Kherson.

== Airlines and destinations ==
As of 24 February 2022, all passenger flights at Kherson have been suspended indefinitely. The following airlines previously operated regular scheduled and charter flights at the airport.

| Airlines | Destinations |
|---|---|
| Pegasus Airlines | Istanbul–Sabiha Gökçen |
| SkyUp | Seasonal charter: Antalya, Sharm El Sheikh |
| Turkish Airlines | Istanbul |
| Ukraine International Airlines | Kyiv–Boryspil |

== Statistics ==
| Year | Passengers | Change on previous year |
|---|---|---|
| 2014 | 7,900 | |
| 2015 | 61,235 | ▲675.1% |
| 2016 | 62,557 | ▲2.2% |
| 2017 | 105,900 | ▲69.3% |
| 2018 | 150,100 | ▲41.7% |
| 2019 | 154,046 | ▲2.6% |

== Kherson Air Base ==
The base, also known as the Chornobaivka airfield, was home to the 11th Separate Army Aviation Regiment of the Ukrainian Army Aviation.

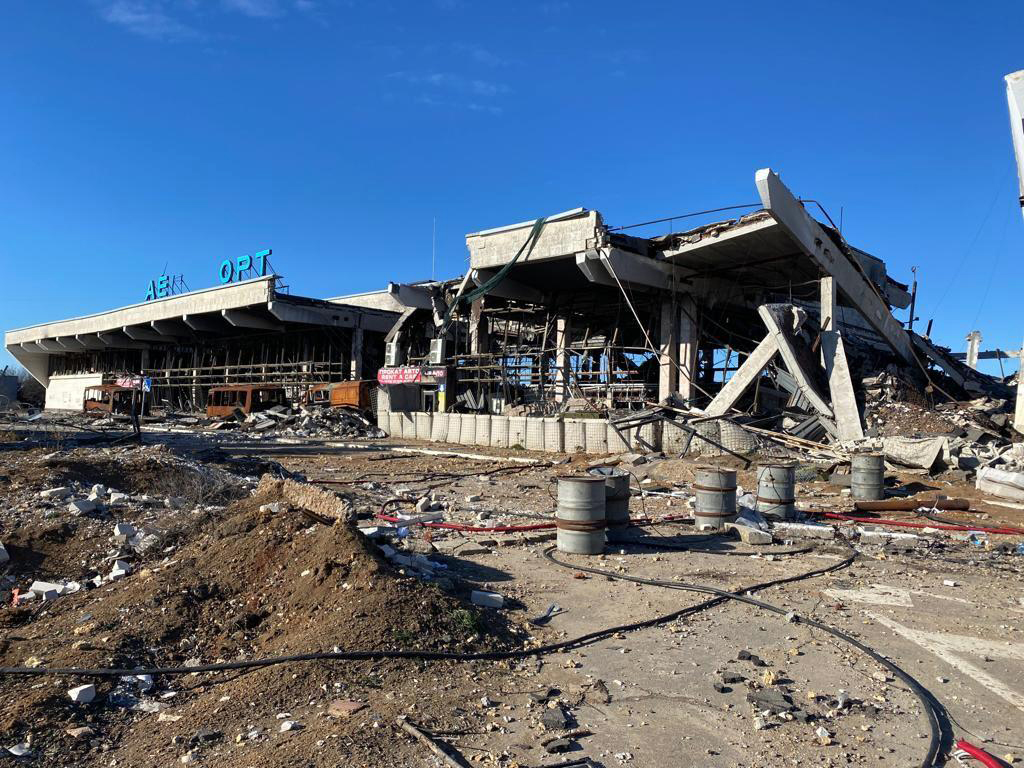
Ruins of the airport

It was one of the Ukrainian air bases attacked early in the 2022 Russian invasion of Ukraine. The Russian forces took over the airbase in the course of the battle of Kherson on 2 March 2022, and set up a command post there, which was targeted by the Ukrainian military several times since then. On 16 March, Ukraine launched an airstrike against Russian forces at the airbase, destroying at least seven helicopters and a number of vehicles. Ukrainian officials claimed the attacks killed two high-ranking Russian commanders, generals Andrey Mordvichev and Yakov Rezantsev. On 23 March, the Ukrainian media cited satellite imagery showing that most of the Russian military aircraft had been removed from the airfield, but the troops remained on the ground.

Ukrainian attacks against Russian forces extended up to 5 November, and on 11 November, Chornobaivka and the airport were liberated by the Ukrainian Armed Forces. Russian forces left in the area what has been described as "a huge minefield and a graveyard of Russian weapons, vehicles and personnel".

== See also ==
- List of airports in Ukraine
- List of the busiest airports in Ukraine
- List of the busiest airports in Europe
- List of the busiest airports in the former USSR
- Transportation in Ukraine
