= Andrei Sychevoi =

Russian general active in Ukraine in 2022

Andrei Sychevoi Андрей Сычевой
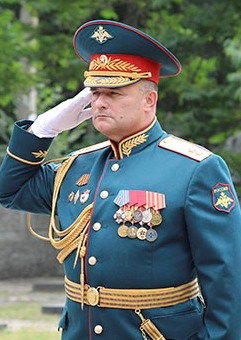
- Andrei Sychevoi in 2020
- Born: May 16, 1969 (age 56); Troitskaya, Krymsky District, Krasnodar Krai, Russian SFSR
- Allegiance: Soviet Union (to 1991); Russia
- Branch: Soviet Army; Russian Ground Forces
- Service years: 1986–present
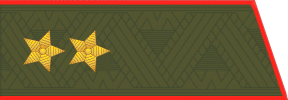
- Rank: Lieutenant General
- Commands: 2nd Guards Motor Rifle Division; 8th Guards Combined Arms Army; Western Military District
- Conflicts: Syrian Civil War; Russo-Ukrainian War; Russian invasion of Ukraine
- Awards: Order for Military Merit; Order of Courage (2)

Andrei Ivanovich Sychevoi (Russian: Андрей Иванович Сычевой; born 16 May 1969) is a Russian military officer and Lieutenant General of the Russian Armed Forces.

Commander of the 8th Guards Combined Arms Army in February 2022.

On 20 July 2022 during the 2022 Russian invasion of Ukraine, Sergei Shoigu, the Minister of Defence of Russia, appointed Sychevoi commander of Russian forces of the Western Military District, replacing Colonel General Alexander Zhuravlyov, who was removed after the initial phases of the war. Sychevoi was reportedly dismissed from the post by 4 September 2022.

In early September 2022, Newsweek speculated that Sychevoi had been captured by Ukrainian forces in Kharkiv. However, the individual captured was an unrelated minor Russian officer that had a similar appearance to Sychevoi.

Sychevoi is infamous for refusing any and all media comment, however, Russian milbloggers reported that he was in charge of the defense of the Donetsk Oblast during the 2023 Ukrainian counteroffensive and was sacked of his command on October 1, 2023, for poor performance. Namely losing the villages of Klishchiivka and Andriivka and launching an unsupported and unprepared counterattack on the two villages which also failed.

== Sanctions ==
He was sanctioned by the UK government in 2022 in relation to the Russo-Ukrainian War.

On similar grounds, he has been under Swiss sanctions since March 4, 2022.

Since May 6, 2022, he has been under Canadian sanctions for "complicity in President Putin's choice to invade a peaceful and sovereign country".
