= Chornobaivka =

Village in Kherson Oblast, Ukraine

Chornobaivka Чорнобаївка
- Village
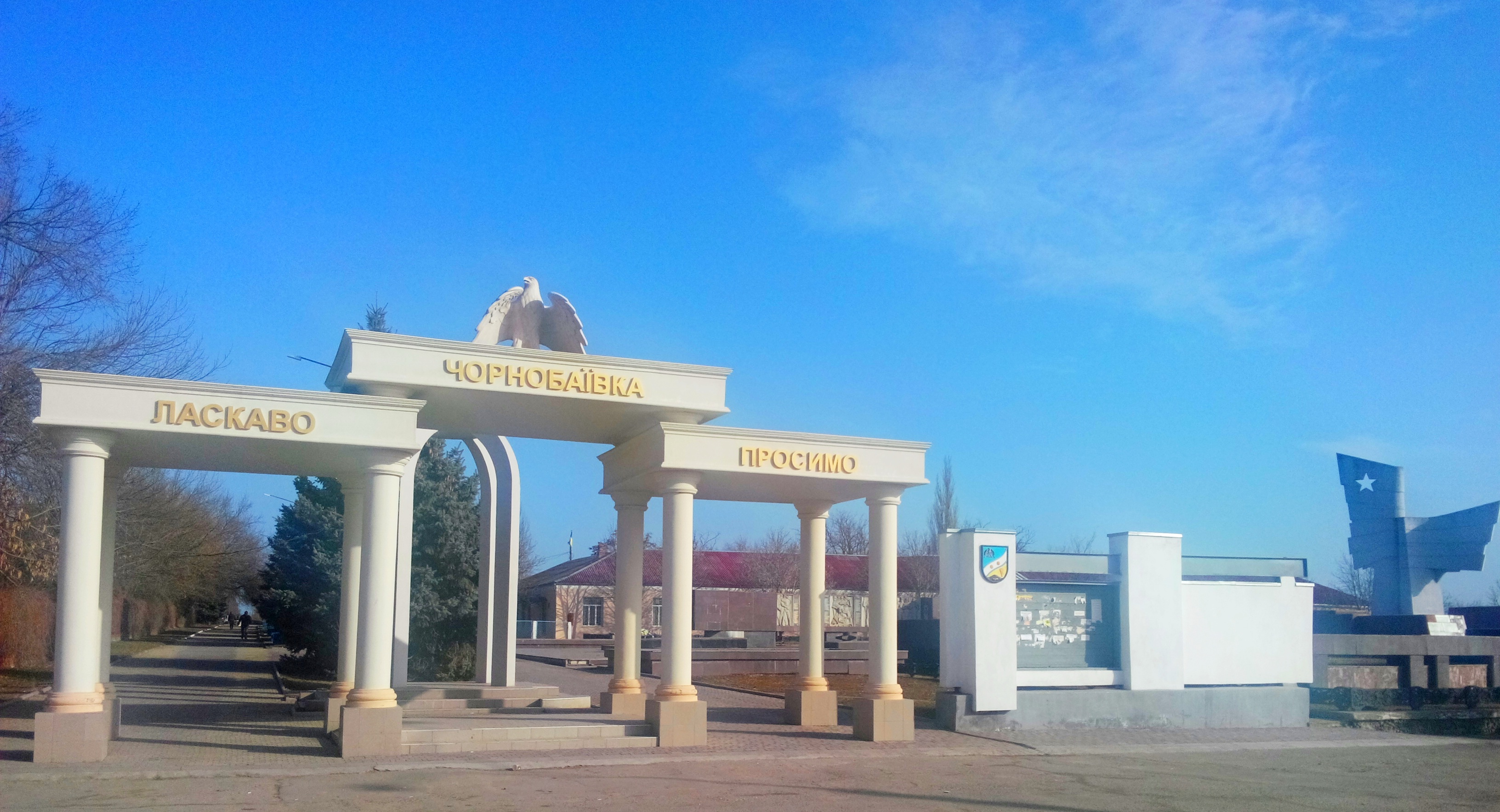

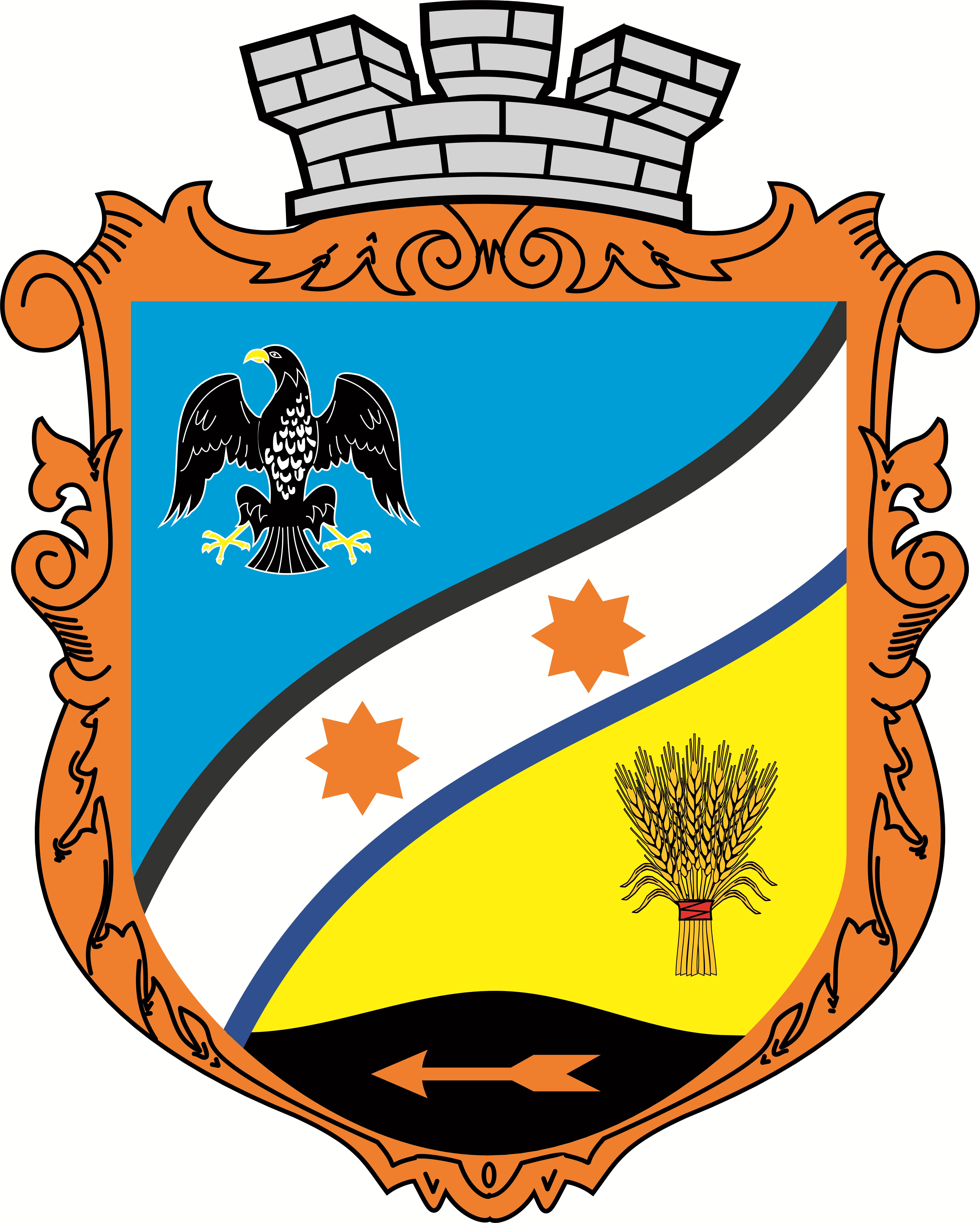
- Flag Coat of arms
- Interactive map of Chornobaivka
- Location of Chornobaivka Chornobaivka (Ukraine)
- Coordinates: 46°42′02″N 32°32′52″E
- Country: Ukraine
- Oblast: Kherson Oblast
- Raion: Kherson Raion
- Hromada: Chornobaivka rural hromada
- Founded: August 18, 1782; 244 years ago
- Named for: Petro Chornobay

Population (2001)
  - Total: 9,275

Chornobaivka (Ukrainian: Чорнобаївка, pronounced [tʃornoˈbɑjiu̯kɐ]) is a suburban village in Kherson Raion, Kherson Oblast, southern Ukraine. It is the center of the village council. It hosts the administration of the Chornobaivka rural hromada, one of the hromadas of Ukraine. Kherson International Airport is situated in Chornobaivka.

== History ==
=== Founding ===
Chornobaivka was founded officially on August 18, 1782, by the Zaporozhian Sich Cossack Petro Chornobay, after he received a plot of land from Catherine II. The settlement's name is derived from him.

=== Development ===
Chornobaivka grew slowly. From the documents of the Kherson provincial zemstvo, it is known that in 1859 the village had 60 yards, in which 239 people lived. The main income of Chornobaivka's inhabitants was the extraction of limestone. There were no trade enterprises on the farms at that time, except for wine shops. Healthcare resources were limited. The first school was opened in the late nineteenth century and was attended by 26 boys and 6 girls.

In 1902, a primary school for a small number of children was opened in Chornobaievi Khutory.

=== 20th century and early 21st century ===
During World War II, Nazi Germany occupied Chornobaivka starting 9 August 1941. In 1942, the Nazis began forcibly deporting the town's young people back to Germany. Over the occupation, 242 people were deported and pressed to do forced labor. Eventually, on 14 March 1944, the 295th Rifle Division of the Red Army liberated the village.

Throughout the early 1970s, "radical" development took place in Chornobaivka. Five main streets were paved with asphalt, new houses were built, a water system was laid out, and a radio network was formed.

In 2006, Kherson Airport, located in Chornobaivka, received international status.

=== 2022 Russian invasion of Ukraine ===
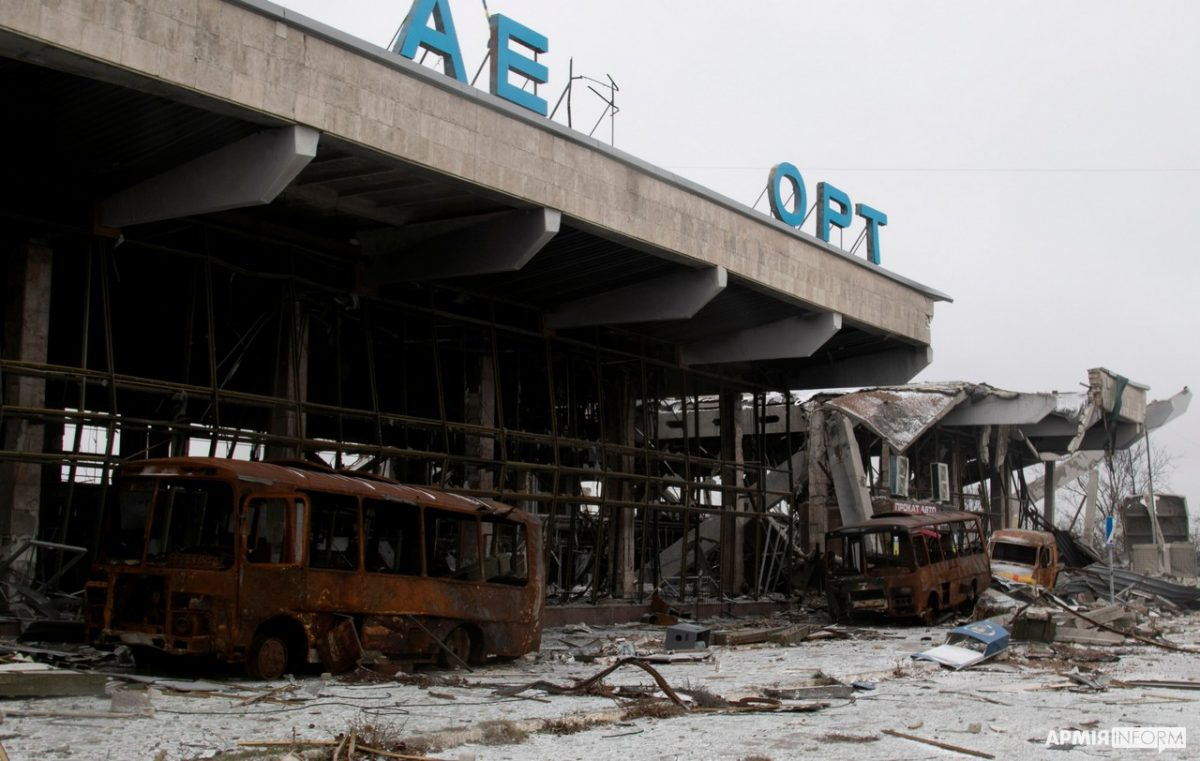
The Kherson International Airport in Chornobaivka after the Russian withdrawal from the village

In the first days of the Russian invasion of Ukraine, Russian forces took control of the village and its airfield. The airbase was strategically important for Russian forces and their war effort. During the months of occupation, Ukraine launched numerous attacks and airstrikes on Russian forces within the village, destroying Russian equipment and killing Russian personnel. The village "achieved legendary status" for Ukrainians due to the extent of losses Russia took in the small village again and again.

Russian forces also committed numerous human rights violations against civilians in the village during the occupation. Local officials reported that the Russians "shot and killed at least 20 civilians" during this time. Chornobaivka was eventually liberated by Ukrainian troops on 11 November 2022 during the 2022 Kherson counteroffensive. However, as late as December, the village still had no electricity, water, or heating, as Russian shelling of Ukraine-controlled areas increased.

== Geography ==
Chornobaivka is located in the south of Ukraine within the steppe zone on the Black Sea lowland of the Eastern European plain. The settlement is located 10 km from the regional center. The physical distance to Kyiv is 414 km.

== Climate ==
Climate data for Chornobaivka
Month	Jan	Feb	Mar	Apr	May	Jun	Jul	Aug	Sep	Oct	Nov	Dec	Year
Mean maximum °C	0.3	1.4	5.7	14.4	21.0	25.6	28.1	27.6	22.3	14.9	7.7	3.4	14.8
Daily mean °C	−2.7	−1.7	2.1	9.8	15.9	20.3	22.6	22.0	16.9	10.3	4.5	0.6	10.1
Mean minimum °C	−5.7	−4.8	−1.5	5.2	10.9	15.0	17.1	16.4	11.5	5.8	1.3	−2.1	5.8
Average precipitation mm	32	30	26	32	40	47	51	36	41	28	35	37	385
Daily mean °F	27.1	28.9	35.8	49.6	60.6	68.5	72.7	71.6	62.4	50.5	40.1	33.1	50.2
Average precipitation inches	1.3	1.2	1.0	1.3	1.6	1.9	2.0	1.4	1.6	1.1	1.4	1.5	15.2

== Notable people ==
- Aleksey Kirichenko, Soviet politician.
- Yurii Vukhnal, writer and humorist.
- Motorny Dmitry Konstantinovich, Soviet and Ukrainian innovator of agricultural production, twice Hero of Socialist Labor (1966, 1986). Hero of Ukraine (2002).

== Demographics ==
According to the 2001 census, 9275 people lived in the village. The native language distribution of Chornobaivka in 2001 was:

Language	Number of people	Percentage of people
Ukrainian	8505	91.70%
Russian	680	7.33%
Belarusian	35	0.38%
Moldovan (Romanian)	21	0.23%
Armenian	7	0.08%
Romani	5	0.05%
Polish	2	0.02%
Bulgarian	1	0.01%
Other	19	0.20%

== Bibliography ==
- Kostenko, Anton; Nesterenko, Olga (2017). Чорнобаївка: вчора, сьогодні, завтра (до 235-ї річниці заснування села) (PDF) (in Ukrainian).
