= Zubovo =

Rural locality name

Zubovo (Russian: Зубово) is the name of several rural localities in Russia.

== Arkhangelsk Oblast ==
As of 2010, two rural localities in Arkhangelsk Oblast bear this name:

- Zubovo, Leshukonsky District, Arkhangelsk Oblast, a settlement in Vozhgorsky Selsoviet of Leshukonsky District
- Zubovo, Plesetsky District, Arkhangelsk Oblast, a village in Fedovsky Selsoviet of Plesetsky District

== Republic of Bashkortostan ==
As of 2010, two rural localities in the Republic of Bashkortostan bear this name:

- Zubovo, Chishminsky District, Republic of Bashkortostan, a village in Yeremeyevsky Selsoviet of Chishminsky District
- Zubovo, Ufimsky District, Republic of Bashkortostan, a selo in Zubovsky Selsoviet of Ufimsky District

== Kaluga Oblast ==
As of 2010, three rural localities in Kaluga Oblast bear this name:

- Zubovo, Iznoskovsky District, Kaluga Oblast, a village in Iznoskovsky District
- Zubovo, Mosalsky District, Kaluga Oblast, a village in Mosalsky District
- Zubovo, Yukhnovsky District, Kaluga Oblast, a village in Yukhnovsky District

== Kostroma Oblast ==
As of 2010, one rural locality in Kostroma Oblast bears this name:

- Zubovo, Kostroma Oblast, a village in Sumarokovskoye Settlement of Susaninsky District

== Moscow Oblast ==
As of 2010, four rural localities in Moscow Oblast bear this name:

- Zubovo, Kashirsky District, Moscow Oblast, a village in Domninskoye Rural Settlement of Kashirsky District
- Zubovo, Klinsky District, Moscow Oblast, a settlement in Zubovskoye Rural Settlement of Klinsky District
- Zubovo, Naro-Fominsky District, Moscow Oblast, a village in Veselevskoye Rural Settlement of Naro-Fominsky District
- Zubovo, Volokolamsky District, Moscow Oblast, a village in Yaropoletskoye Rural Settlement of Volokolamsky District

== Nizhny Novgorod Oblast ==
As of 2010, eight rural localities in Nizhny Novgorod Oblast bear this name:

- Zubovo, Bor, Nizhny Novgorod Oblast, a village in Krasnoslobodsky Selsoviet of the city of oblast significance of Bor
- Zubovo, Semyonov, Nizhny Novgorod Oblast, a village in Pafnutovsky Selsoviet of the city of oblast significance of Semyonov
- Zubovo, Chkalovsky District, Nizhny Novgorod Oblast, a village in Kotelnitsky Selsoviet of Chkalovsky District
- Zubovo, Brilyakovsky Selsoviet, Gorodetsky District, Nizhny Novgorod Oblast, a village in Brilyakovsky Selsoviet of Gorodetsky District
- Zubovo, Timiryazevsky Selsoviet, Gorodetsky District, Nizhny Novgorod Oblast, a village in Timiryazevsky Selsoviet of Gorodetsky District
- Zubovo, Krasnobakovsky District, Nizhny Novgorod Oblast, a village in Chashchikhinsky Selsoviet of Krasnobakovsky District
- Zubovo, Sokolsky District, Nizhny Novgorod Oblast, a village in Loyminsky Selsoviet of Sokolsky District
- Zubovo, Urensky District, Nizhny Novgorod Oblast, a village in Karpunikhinsky Selsoviet of Urensky District

== Novgorod Oblast ==
As of 2010, one rural locality in Novgorod Oblast bears this name:

- Zubovo, Novgorod Oblast, a village under the administrative jurisdiction of the urban-type settlement of Lyubytino in Lyubytinsky District

== Penza Oblast ==
As of 2010, one rural locality in Penza Oblast bears this name:

- Zubovo, Penza Oblast, a selo in Zubovsky Selsoviet of Spassky District

== Pskov Oblast ==
As of 2010, five rural localities in Pskov Oblast bear this name:

- Zubovo, Kunyinsky District, Pskov Oblast, a village in Kunyinsky District
- Zubovo, Opochetsky District, Pskov Oblast, a village in Opochetsky District
- Zubovo, Ostrovsky District, Pskov Oblast, a village in Ostrovsky District
- Zubovo, Pechorsky District, Pskov Oblast, a village in Pechorsky District
- Zubovo, Pskovsky District, Pskov Oblast, a village in Pskovsky District

== Ryazan Oblast ==
As of 2010, three rural localities in Ryazan Oblast bear this name:

- Zubovo, Davydovsky Rural Okrug, Klepikovsky District, Ryazan Oblast, a village in Davydovsky Rural Okrug of Klepikovsky District
- Zubovo, Tyukovsky Rural Okrug, Klepikovsky District, Ryazan Oblast, a village in Tyukovsky Rural Okrug of Klepikovsky District
- Zubovo, Rybnovsky District, Ryazan Oblast, a village in Markovsky Rural Okrug of Rybnovsky District

== Smolensk Oblast ==
As of 2010, four rural localities in Smolensk Oblast bear this name:

- Zubovo, Bogdanovskoye Rural Settlement, Kholm-Zhirkovsky District, Smolensk Oblast, a village in Bogdanovskoye Rural Settlement of Kholm-Zhirkovsky District
- Zubovo, Bolyshevskoye Rural Settlement, Kholm-Zhirkovsky District, Smolensk Oblast, a village in Bolyshevskoye Rural Settlement of Kholm-Zhirkovsky District
- Zubovo, Yartsevsky District, Smolensk Oblast, a village in Podroshchinskoye Rural Settlement of Yartsevsky District
- Zubovo, Yelninsky District, Smolensk Oblast, a village in Mutishchenskoye Rural Settlement of Yelninsky District

== Tver Oblast ==
As of 2010, three rural localities in Tver Oblast bear this name:

- Zubovo, Rzhevsky District, Tver Oblast, a village in Rzhevsky District
- Zubovo, Zapadnodvinsky District, Tver Oblast, a village in Zapadnodvinsky District
- Zubovo, Zubtsovsky District, Tver Oblast, a village in Zubtsovsky District

== Vladimir Oblast ==
As of 2010, one rural locality in Vladimir Oblast bears this name:

- Zubovo, Vladimir Oblast, a village in Sobinsky District

== Vologda Oblast ==
As of 2010, four rural localities in Vologda Oblast bear this name:

- Zubovo, Gulinsky Selsoviet, Belozersky District, Vologda Oblast, a village in Gulinsky Selsoviet of Belozersky District
- Zubovo, Sholsky Selsoviet, Belozersky District, Vologda Oblast, a selo in Sholsky Selsoviet of Belozersky District
- Zubovo, Chagodoshchensky District, Vologda Oblast, a village in Pokrovsky Selsoviet of Chagodoshchensky District
- Zubovo, Sheksninsky District, Vologda Oblast, a village in Domshinsky Selsoviet of Sheksninsky District

== Yaroslavl Oblast ==
As of 2010, four rural localities in Yaroslavl Oblast bear this name:

- Zubovo, Borisoglebsky District, Yaroslavl Oblast, a village in Pokrovsky Rural Okrug of Borisoglebsky District
- Zubovo, Danilovsky District, Yaroslavl Oblast, a village in Yermakovsky Rural Okrug of Danilovsky District
- Zubovo, Pokrovsky Rural Okrug, Lyubimsky District, Yaroslavl Oblast, a village in Pokrovsky Rural Okrug of Lyubimsky District
- Zubovo, Voskresensky Rural Okrug, Lyubimsky District, Yaroslavl Oblast, a village in Voskresensky Rural Okrug of Lyubimsky District

== See also ==
- Zubov (surname)
