= Zubov (disambiguation) =

Zubov is a family of Russian nobility that came to power in the late 18th century. It may also refer to:

== People ==
- Zubov (surname)

== Other ==
- Zubov Bay, a bay on the west side of the Antarctic Peninsula
- Zubov's method, used in control theory, proposed in 1961 by Vladimir Ivanovich Zubov
- Zubovo
- Zubova Polyana
