= Zubov (surname) =

Zubov, and its feminine form, Zubova, is a surname originating from the Russian word zub (tooth). Its transliteration variant is Zuboff.

Notable people with this surname include:

- Alexey Zubov (1682–c. 1750), Russian etcher
- Anastasiya Zubova (born 1979), Russian long-distance runner
- Andrey Zubov (born 1952), Russian historian and political scientist
- Fyodor Zubov (1615–1689), Russian painter whose works are featured in the Novodevichy Convent
- Hennady Zubov (born 1977), Ukrainian footballer
- Ilya Zubov (born 1987), Russian ice hockey player
- Konstantin Zubov (1888–1956), Russian theatrical actor who worked with Varvara Massalitinova
- Mara Zubova (1749–1799), Russian composer and concert singer
- Nikolay Alexandrovich Zubov (1763–1805), Russian Count who planned to assassinate Tsar Paul of Russia
- Nikolay Nikolaevich Zubov (1885–1960), Russian Soviet oceanologist and Arctic explorer
- Olga Zubova (born 1993), Russian weightlifter
- Oleksandr Zubov (born 1983), Ukrainian chess player and Grandmaster
- Pavel Zubov (born 1988), Russian footballer
- Platon Zubov (1767–1822), Russian politician and favourite of Catherine the Great
- Pyotr Zubrov (1822–1873), Russian stage actor
- Sergei Zubov (born 1970), Russian ice hockey player
- Valerian Zubov (1771–1804), Russian general who led the Russian invasion of Persia in 1796
- Varvara Zubova (born 2002), Russian gymnast
- Vasily Zubov (1900–1963), Russian science historian
- Vladimir Ivanovich Zubov (1930-2000), Russian mathematician.

== See also ==
- Zubkov
