= Taigan (disambiguation) =

Taigan is a sighthound breed from Kyrgyzstan

Taigan may also refer to:

- Taigan (safari park), a lion safari park in Crimea
- Taigan Reservoir, Crimea
