= Zubakov =

Zubakov (masculine, Russian: Зубаков) or Zubakova (feminine, Russian: Зубакова) is a Russian surname. Notable people with the surname include:

- Valeri Zubakov (born 1946), Russian footballer and manager

== See also ==
- Zubkov
