= Raccoon of Kherson =

Stolen Ukrainian raccoon in the Russian invasion of Ukraine

The raccoon of Kherson (Ukrainian: єнот з Херсона, romanized: yenot z Khersona) is a raccoon that was stolen from the city of Kherson in November 2022 by Russian zookeeper Oleg Zubkov. The theft occurred during the Russian retreat from Kherson during the Russian invasion of Ukraine, with Zubkov stating that he took the raccoon, along with several other animals, from Kherson to his safari park in Crimea to protect them from the war. The animal became a subject of satirical memes in Ukraine while in Russia it became a reported source of morale and tool in pro-Russian propaganda, receiving the call name Kherson in Russian media.

== Theft ==
On 11 November 2022, Oleg Zubkov, the zookeeper and director of the Taigan safari park in Russia-occupied Crimea published a video of himself grabbing raccoons from the zoo in Kherson, under the title "We are in Kherson. Oleg Zubkov catches raccoons with BARE HANDS!!!". The video also shows people in Taigan uniforms loading other animals into trucks, leading media observers to assume the people were transporting the animals to Taigan. Zubkov later made the video unavailable, but was already reuploaded by social media users at that point. The raccoon in particular came to wider attention when Russian nationalist blogger and poet Anna Dolgareva bragged on Telegram about the theft that the "only good news" about Russia's recent loss of Kherson was that her friend had stolen the raccoon.

A few days later, Zubkov stated in an interview that the animals from the Kherson Zoo were taken to Russian-occupied Crimea and placed in the Taigan safari park. According to him, two wolves, a llama, a donkey, seven raccoons, peacocks, guinea fowls, and pheasants were brought in total. He called his actions "rescuing" the animals from the warzone and promised to return them when peace returned to Kherson. He also said that he had been asked by Vladimir Saldo, the head of the Russian occupation administration of Kherson Oblast, to evacuate the animals.

== Reactions ==
=== In Ukraine ===
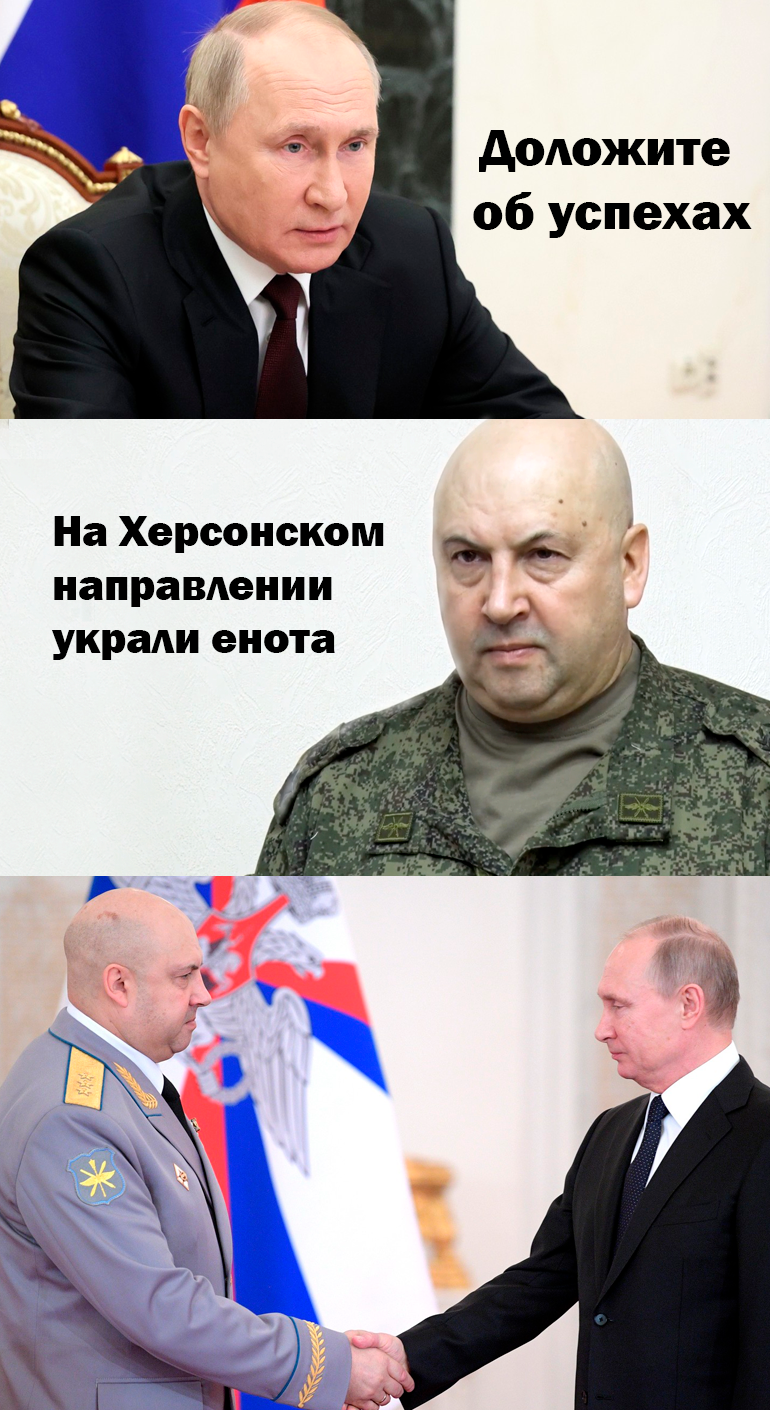
A meme about the raccoon: Vladimir Putin asks general Sergey Surovikin to report on military successes. Surovikin responds: "A raccoon was stolen on the Kherson direction".

On November 13, Oleksandr Todorchuk, founder of the Ukrainian animal welfare organization UAnimals, announced that the Russian command had stolen the raccoon from the Kherson Zoo, confirming the account that the animals had been taken to Crimea. Dolgareva later denied that the theft had taken place. In turn, a screenshot of her original post went viral on Twitter, leading to numerous memes and jokes about the raccoon being created.

The Ukrainian branch of BBC News reported that the raccoon had become a symbol of war and "the absurdity of the Russian military", which is perceived to steal everything from washing machines to toilets to animals. Ukrainian social media users mocked pro-Russian users' celebration of the theft of the raccoon, joking that the goals of the Russian military in Ukraine had changed from taking the entire territory of the country to stealing a raccoon from a zoo. They referred to the abduction of the animal as the so-called "sacred goal of the Russian special military operation", proposed the creation of a medal for the taking of the raccoon, and created memes presenting scenarios in which Russian President Vladimir Putin reacts to the taking of the raccoon. Some memes called for the raccoon's release, with parodies like "Saving Private Raccoon", a play on Saving Private Ryan.

Serhii Bratchuk, spokesman for the Ukrainian military administration of the Odesa Oblast, sarcastically offered to exchange the raccoon for ten Russian prisoners of war. A petition was created on the website of the Office of the President of Ukraine proposing to exchange the raccoon for the Odesa monument of Catherine the Great, receiving more than 6,500 signatures by 22 November 2022.

General director of Ukrposhta Ihor Smilyanskyi said that Ukrposhta could issue a new stamp featuring the Kherson raccoon. Kherson Oblast Council member Serhii Khlan noted that the symbolic significance of the raccoon to Kherson could be compared to that of the Kherson watermelon.

=== In Russia ===
On November 22, the Russian TV channel Vesti reported on the taking of the raccoon, with the presenter claiming the raccoon was a symbol of Russian soldiers and their victories. The piece also referred to the raccoon in positive terms, equating it to Russian soldiers and said that a name for it, Kherson, was chosen in an online poll. Russian media claimed that the raccoon lives with Russian soldiers in the trenches, and that it loves to play "dirty tricks" and turn their living space "upside-down".

Commentators have described the raccoon as having taken on a "mythological" meaning in Russian propaganda, as a symbol for the Russian military that aims to portray it as "fast and cunning" but "outwardly pleasant, not aggressive". A pro-Russian Telegram channel named after the raccoon was created within weeks of the theft, which frequently posted media related to the raccoon, including some aimed at children.

In December 2022, a video was released showing Vladimir Saldo being bitten by the raccoon during an attempt to pet the animal on video.

== See also ==
- Patron (dog)
