= Zuboff =

Zuboff is a surname of Russian origin. It is a transliteration variant of the Russian surname Zubov, originating from the Russian word zub (tooth). Notable people with the surname include:

- Arnold Zuboff (born 1946), American philosopher
- Shoshana Zuboff (born 1951), American author and scholar

== See also ==
- Zubof Rock, island near Alaska
