= Oleg Zubkov =

Oleg Zubkov may refer to:

- Oleg Zubkov (businessman), Ukrainian and Russian businessman, the owner of Taigan safari park
- Oleg Zubkov, bass guitarist in the Hungarian band Amber Smith
