= Alexey Zubov =

Russian etching artist (1682–c. 1741)

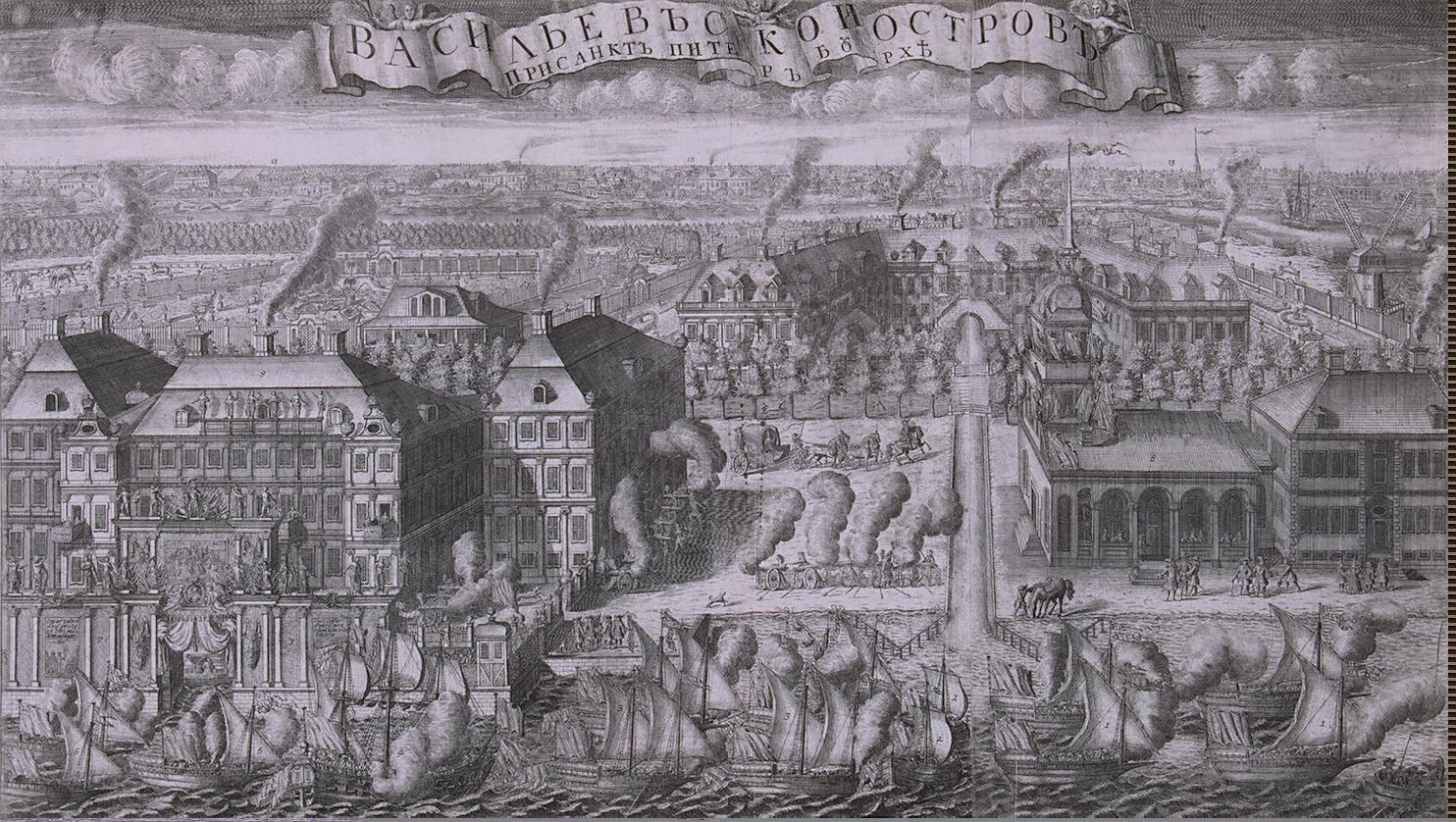
- Alexey Zubov. Swedish Ships Brought to Saint Petersburg after the Battle of Gangut. Etching from 1715.
- Born: 1682
- Died: c. 1741
- Education: Fyodor Zubov, Adriaan Schoonebeek
- Known for: etching
- Notable work: Panoramic View of St. Petersburg

Alexey Fyodorovich Zubov (Russian: Алексе́й Фёдорович Зу́бов; 1682–c.1741) was a Russian etcher.

Zubov and his brother Ivan were accepted as apprentices to their father Fyodor in the Kremlin icon shop at an early age. In 1699 Alexey was apprenticed to the Dutch etcher Adriaan Schoonebeek by the order of Peter the Great.

His etchings of important events, people and monuments of the Tsar's Russia earned him great fame in his own lifetime. The year of his death is unknown, but believed to be on or after 1750.

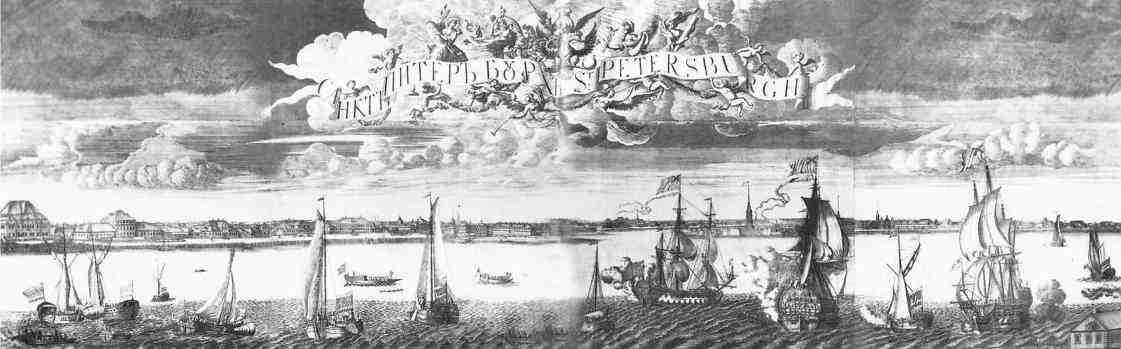
"Panoramic View of St. Petersburg" by Alexey Zubov, 1716
