= Simon Ushakov =

Russian icon painter (c. 1626–1686)

- Симон Ушаков
- Born: c. 1626
- Died: 25 June 1686; Moscow, Tsardom of Russia
- Occupations: Icon painter; engraver
- Known for: Reform of Russian icon painting; Popularizing parsuna portraiture

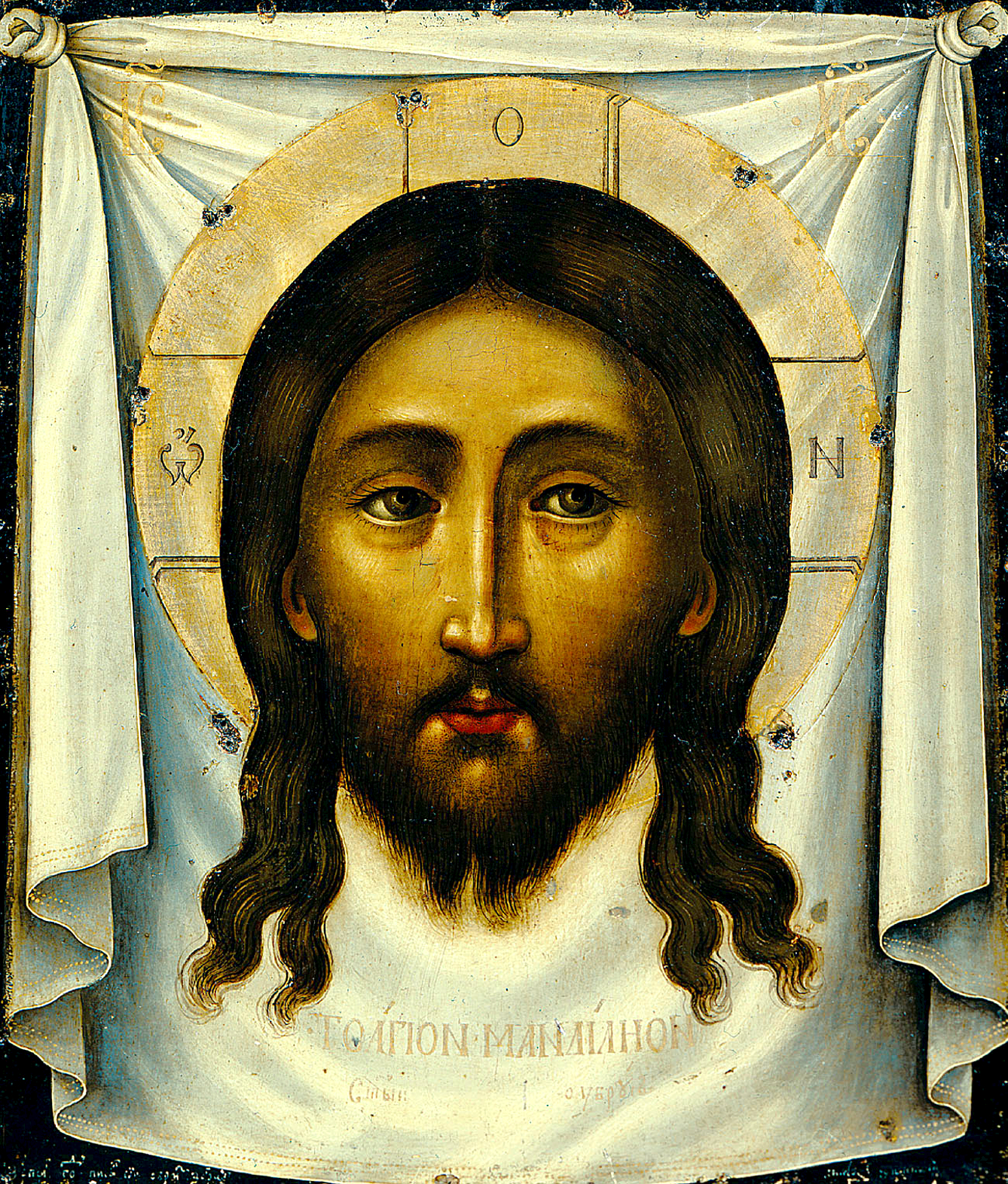
Saviour Not Made by Hands, painted for the Troitse-Sergiyeva Lavra in 1658

Simon (Pimen) Fyodorovich Ushakov (Russian: Симон (Пимен) Фёдорович Ушаков; c. 1626 – 25 June 1686) was a Russian icon painter.

Together with Fyodor Zubov and Fyodor Rozhnov, he is associated with the comprehensive reform of the Russian Orthodox Church undertaken by Patriarch Nikon. Ushakov is also credited with popularizing the genre of secular portrait painting in Russia, known as parsuna.

== Early life ==
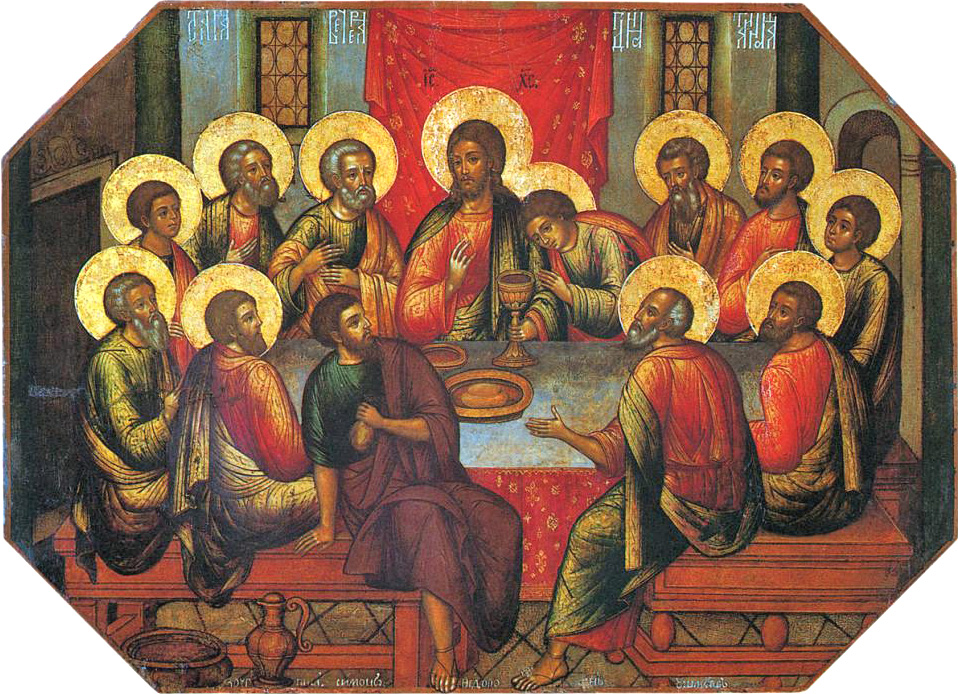
The Last Supper, 1685

Almost nothing about the early years of Simon Ushakov is known. His birth date is deduced from his inscription on one of the icons: "In the year 7166 painted this icon Simon Ushakov son, being 32 years of age".

== Career ==
At the age of 22, he became a paid artist of the Silver Chamber, affiliated with the armory prikaz. The bright, fresh colours and exquisite, curving lines of his proto-baroque icons caught the eye of Patriarch Nikon, who introduced Simon to the tsar Alexei Mikhailovich. He became a great favourite with the royal family and was eventually in 1664 assigned to the Kremlin Armoury, run by an educated boyar called Bogdan Khitrovo.

Ushakov had a lot of pupils and associates and even published a short treatise on icon-painting entitled A Word to Loving-Meticulous Icon Painting in 1664. Some of the more conservative Russian priests, such as archpriest Avvakum, regarded his icons as "lascivious works of devil", for they were too Western for their tastes. Avvakum, in particular, alleged that Ushakov painted his "fleshly saints" after his own portly appearance. Later scholars in the 19th-century regarded Ushakov as starting the "decline" of icon painting.

Ushakov also executed secular commissions and produced engravings for book illustrations. In other words, he was one of the first secular painters in Russia. Some of his icons, transported to Western Europe, were instrumental in fomenting interest for nascent Russian painting. He is regarded as a pioneer of Western influence in portrait painting and engravings for books.

== Death ==
He died on 25 June 1686 in Moscow.

== Selected works ==
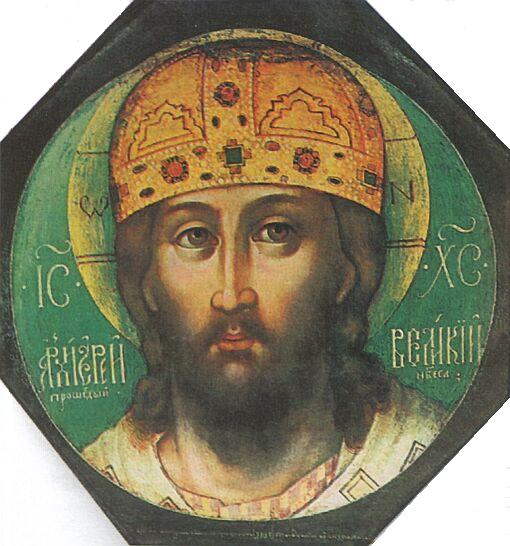
Christ, the Great Hierarch, State Historical Museum (1658)

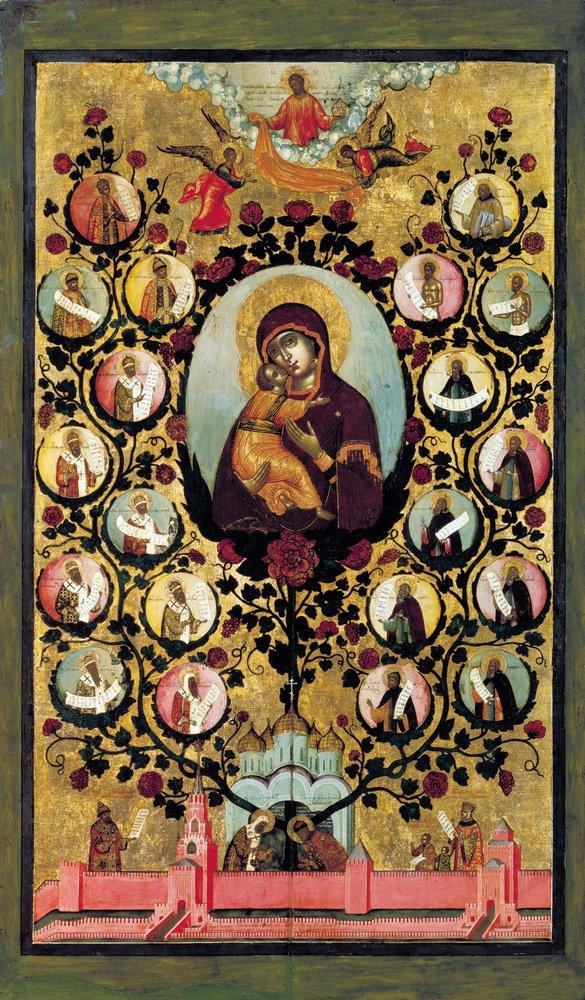
Our Lady of Vladimir, Tree of the Muscovite State, State Tretyakov Gallery (1668)

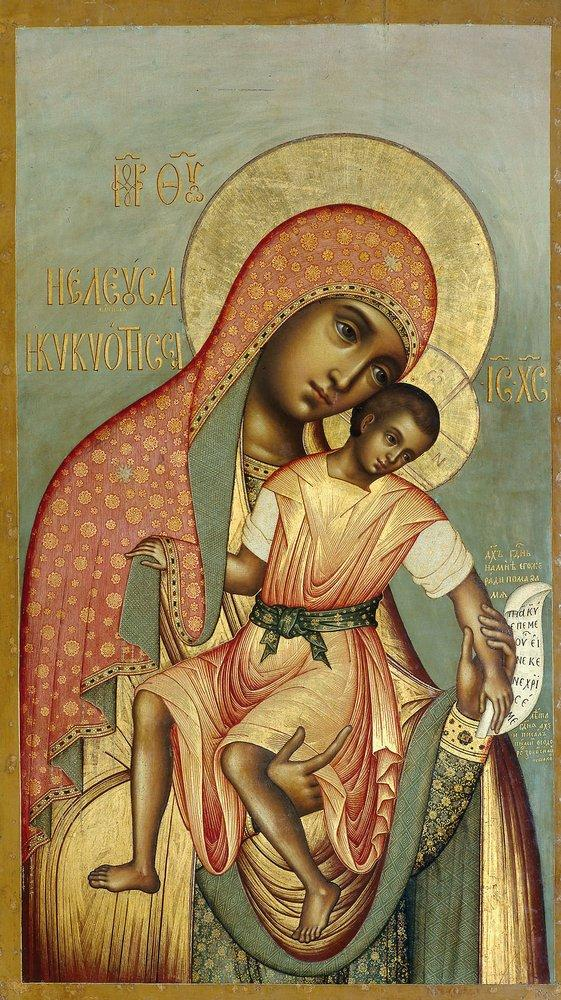
Our Lady of Eleus, State Tretyakov Gallery (1668)

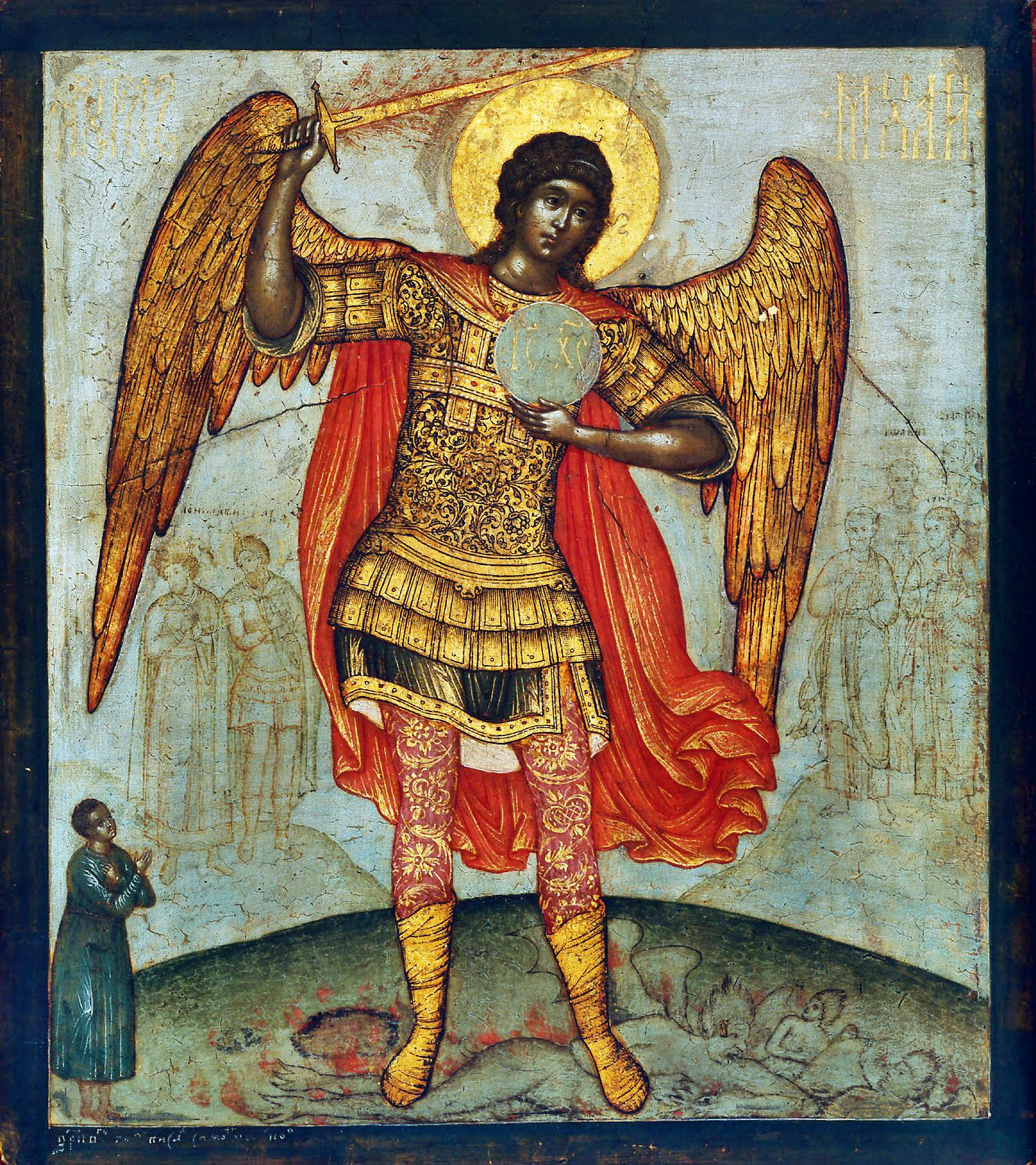
Archangel Michael Trampling the Devil Underfoot, State Tretyakov Gallery (1676)

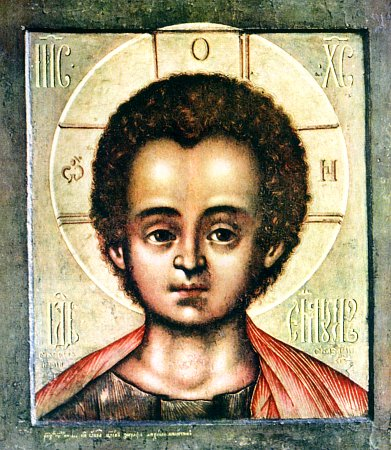
Christ Emmanuel, State Russian Museum (1668)

== Sources ==
- Chapter on Ushakov and his school from Igor Grabar's History of Russian Art
- V. N. Alexandrov, History of Russian Art, Minsk, 2004, ISBN 985-13-1199-5
