= Fyodor Rozhnov =

Russian icon painter (fl. 1692–1703)

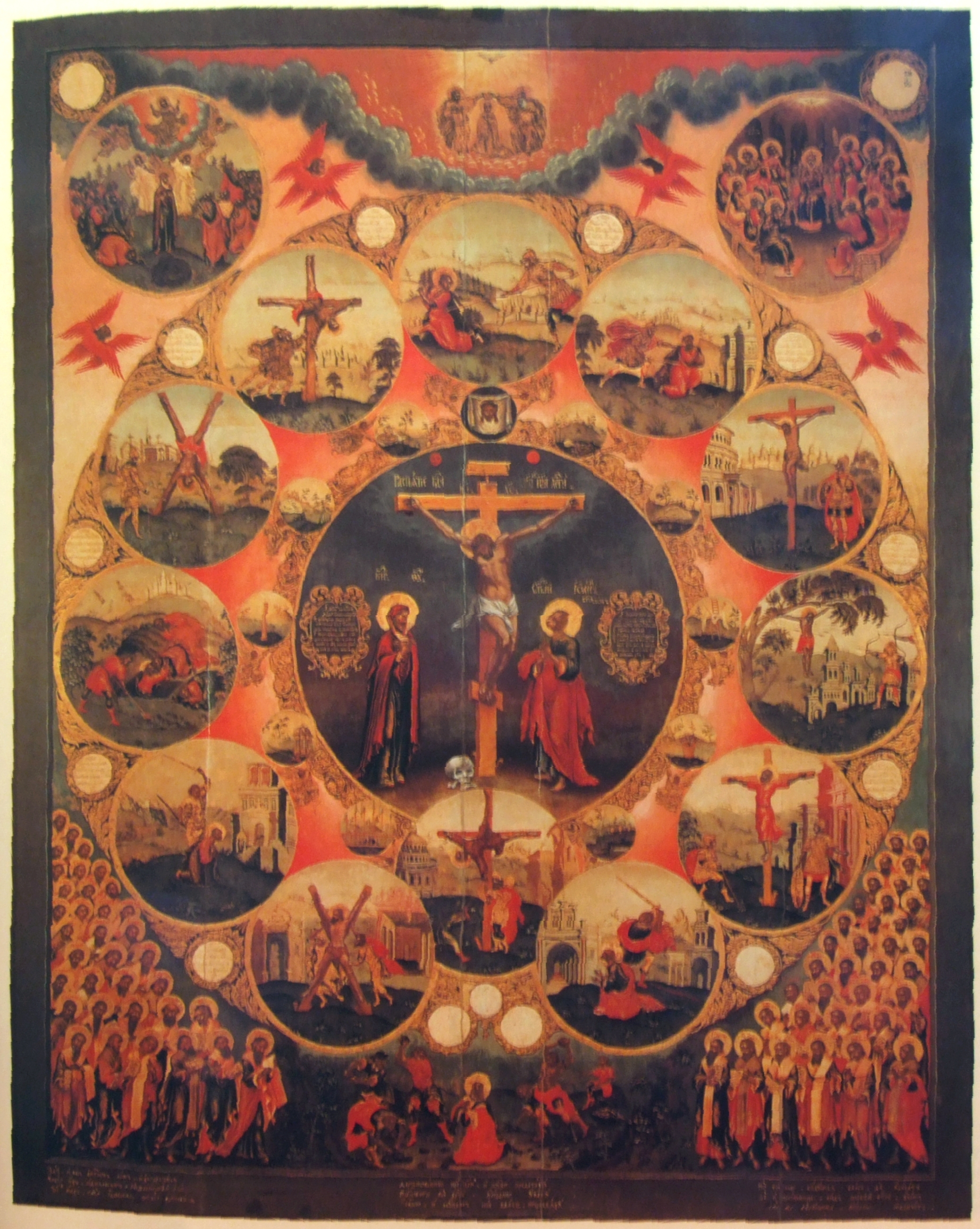
Crucifixion with Apostolic Suffering, Church of the Twelve Apostles (1699)

Fyodor Nikitich Rozhnov (Russian: Фёдор Никитич Рожнов; fl. 1692–1703) was a Russian icon painter from Kazan.

== Career ==
On 13 March 1692, Rozhnov was sent 10 rubles in Kazan by the kazyonny prikaz (treasury) of the Russian Orthodox Church for his work on the image of the resurrection of Christ in the Dormition Cathedral in Moscow.

Some of Rozhnov's most notable works include Apostolic Sermons (1697) in the Dormition Cathedral, St. Equal-to-the-Apostles Constantine and Helen (1695) in the iconostasis, and Crucifixion with Apostolic Suffering (1699) in the Church of the Twelve Apostles.

== See also ==
- Simon Ushakov
