= Taigan (safari park) =

Safari park in the Bilohirsk Raion of Crimea

- Белогорский сафари-парк львов «Тайган»
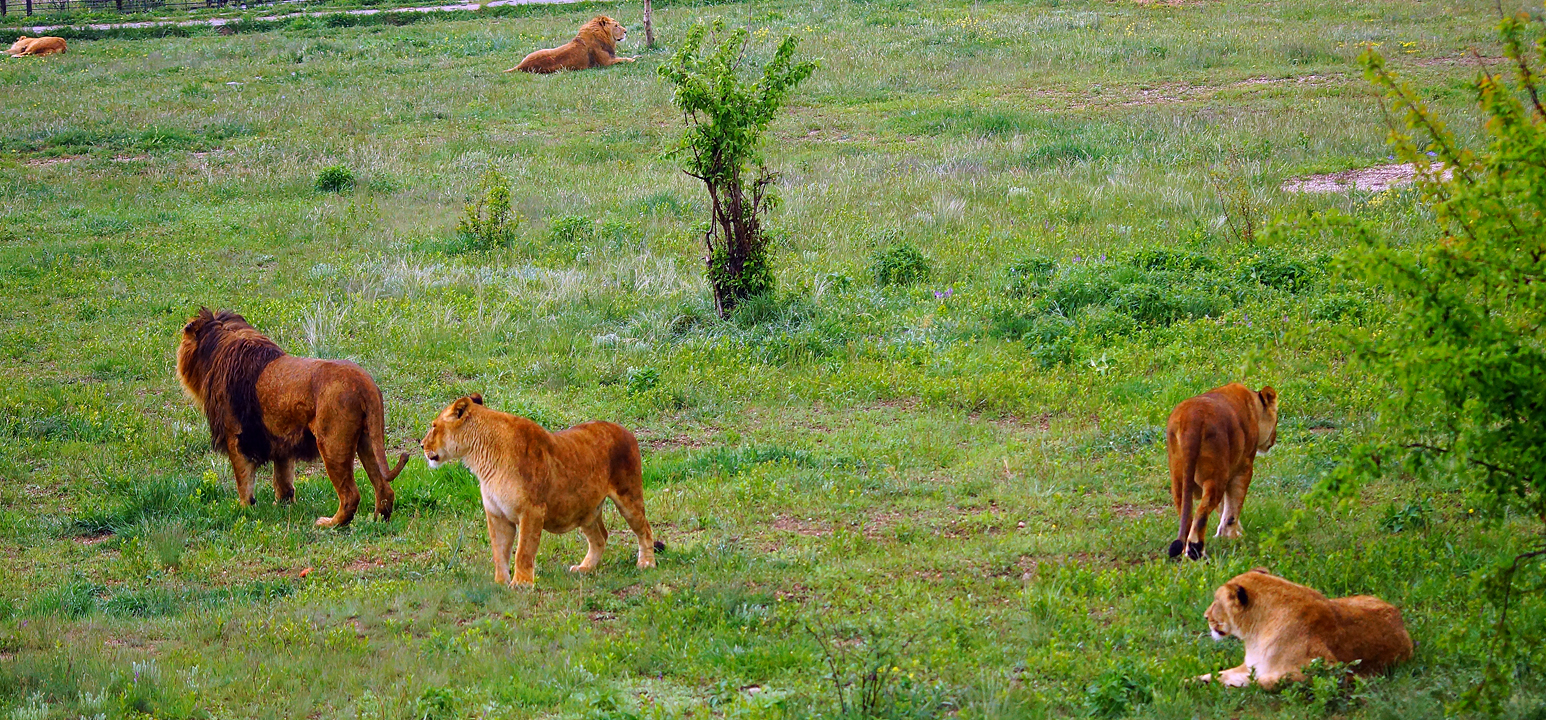
- Interactive map of Taigan
- Location: Belogorsk Raion of Crimea
- Coordinates: 45.054444°N 34.602222°E

The Belogorsk Lion Safari-Park Taigan (Ukrainian: Белогорський сафарі-парк левів «Тайган», romanized: Belohorskyi safari-park leviv "Taigan") is a safari park in the Bilohirsk Raion of Crimea. It is the largest European breeding ground for lions and other large predator mammals. As of 2023 about 60 African lions, along with many tigers and other wild animals, roam over the area of over 30 hectares (70 acres; 0.3 km^{2}) of Crimean foothills by the Taigan Reservoir, and are available for public viewing.

== History ==
In 2006, Ukrainian businessman Oleg Zubkov, already the owner of the Yalta zoopark "Fairy Tale", purchased real estate on the grounds of a former military institution (НИИ систем связи и управления центрального научно-производственного объединения «Каскад»). He initiated the process of acquiring the usage rights for the 35 hectares (90 acres; 0.4 km^{2}) of land around the property, but it became mired in bureaucratic hurdles aggravated by corruption and politics. As a result of the conflict, in 2015 the park was closed for visitors, but it reopened in April 2016.

British journalist Graham Phillips visited Taigan several times, doing video reports from the park, including the "Walk with the Lions", with direct contact with large cats. In 2018, there was a serious incident at Taigan, with a woman reportedly mauled by one of the lions, as she took part in the Walk with the Lions. Oleg Zubkov accused the woman of being 'drunk', however the case attracted widespread negative publicly for Taigan.

Zubkov refused to apologise for the 'mauling' incident, and vowed that his safari tours, allowing patrons direct contact with big cats, would continue as before. Just a couple of months later, Taigan came to the attention of global media again, when a two-year-old lion crawled into a safari vehicle, giving the tourists cuddles, and even licking one woman in the face.

Although the Taigan "Walk with the Lions" safaris initially continued, in April 2019, after a long dispute with Crimean authorities, years of negative publicity, they were finally banned.

In 2019, Zubkov posted a video to his "Lion Man" YouTube channel, saying that his "2,500 lions, tigers, and bears consume 3,500 tonnes of food a day, and he couldn't afford to feed them all for much longer." Zubkov claimed his problems were caused primarily by his ongoing dispute with the Crimean authorities. He then said he was putting numerous of his animals up for adoption, and he would "have to shoot them" if homes were not found for them. Zubkov's video, and statements, attracted international attention and controversy.

Zubkov was convicted of negligence by a Crimean court in July 2022, after one of his tigers bit off the finger of a 1-year-old boy in September 2021. He was given a prison sentence of two years and three months. Zubkov served three months in prison before being released on parole in October. Taigan remained open during Zubkov's detention, and as of 2023 Zubkov is currently based at Taigan as the managing director.

In November 2022, during the Russian withdrawal from Kherson, Zubkov stole numerous animals from the Kherson Zoo and transported them to Taigan, including the "Raccoon of Kherson" which achieved attention on social media.
