= Zubkov =

Zubkov (Russian: Зубков) is a Russian masculine surname, its feminine counterpart is Zubkova. It may refer to

- Alexandr Zubkov (born 1974), Russian bobsledder
- Anatoly Zubkov (1900–1967), Soviet physiologist
- Anastasia Zubkova
- Andrey Zubkov (born 1991), Russian basketball player
- Anna Zubkova
- Antonina Zubkova (1920–1950), Soviet World War II pilot and Hero of the Soviet Union
- Anna Zubkova (born 1980), Kazakhstani water polo player
- Illya Zubkov (born 1998), Ukrainian football player
- Kateryna Zubkova (born 1988), Ukrainian swimmer
- Mikhail Zubkov (born 1968), Russian swimmer
- Oleg Zubkov, multiple persons
- Oleksandr Zubkov (born 1996), Ukrainian football player
- Ruslan Zubkov (born 1991), Ukrainian football player
- Valentin Zubkov (1923–1979), Soviet film actor
- Viktor Zubkov (born 1941), Russian politician and businessman
- Viktor Zubkov (basketball) (1937–2016), Russian basketball player
- Vladimir Zubkov (born 1958), Russian ice hockey player
- Vladimir Zubkov (wrestler) (born 1948), Belarusian wrestler
- Vladyslav Zubkov (born 1971), Ukrainian football player

== See also ==
- Zubov
