= Liberation of Kherson =

November 2022 event during the Russo-Ukrainian War

- Part of the Kherson counteroffensive of the Russo-Ukrainian war
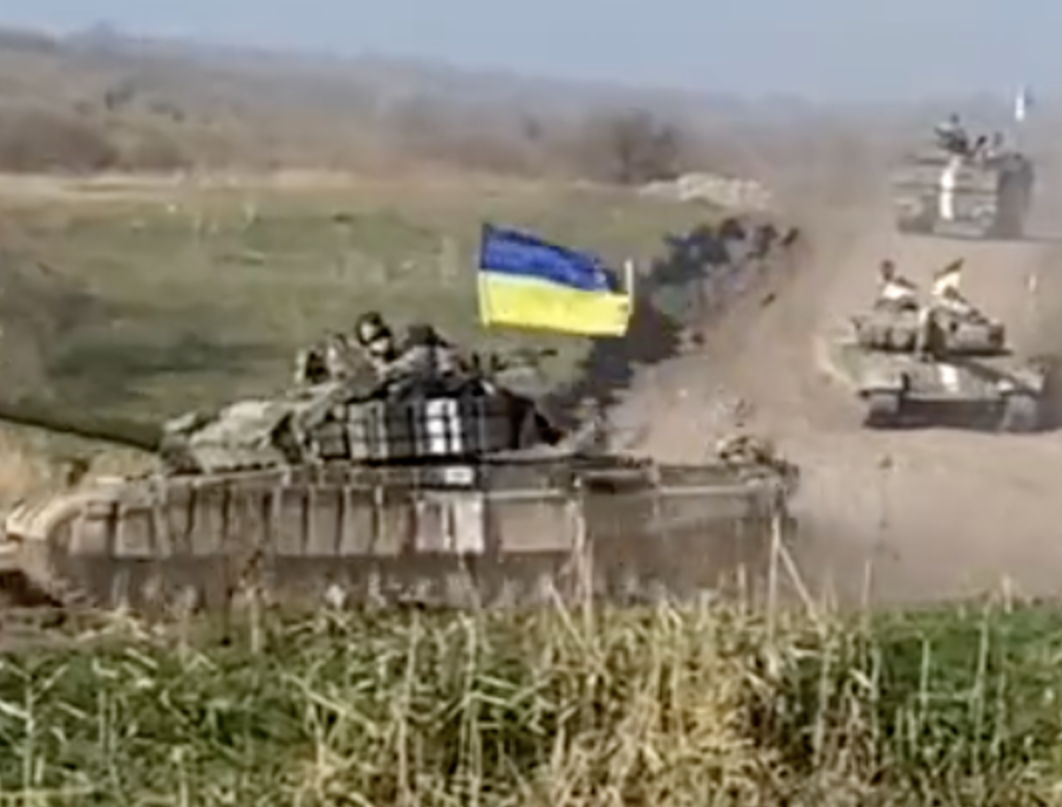
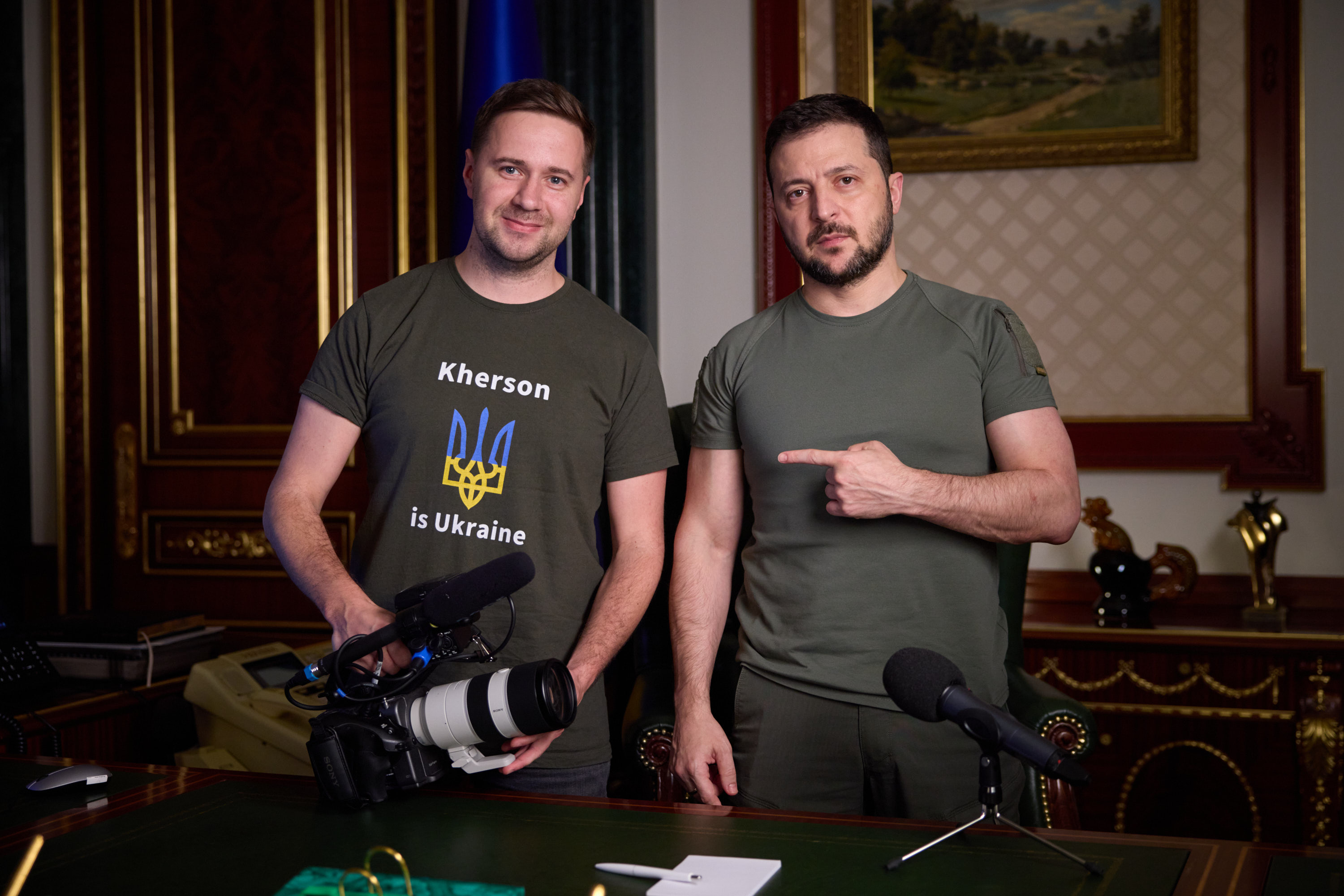
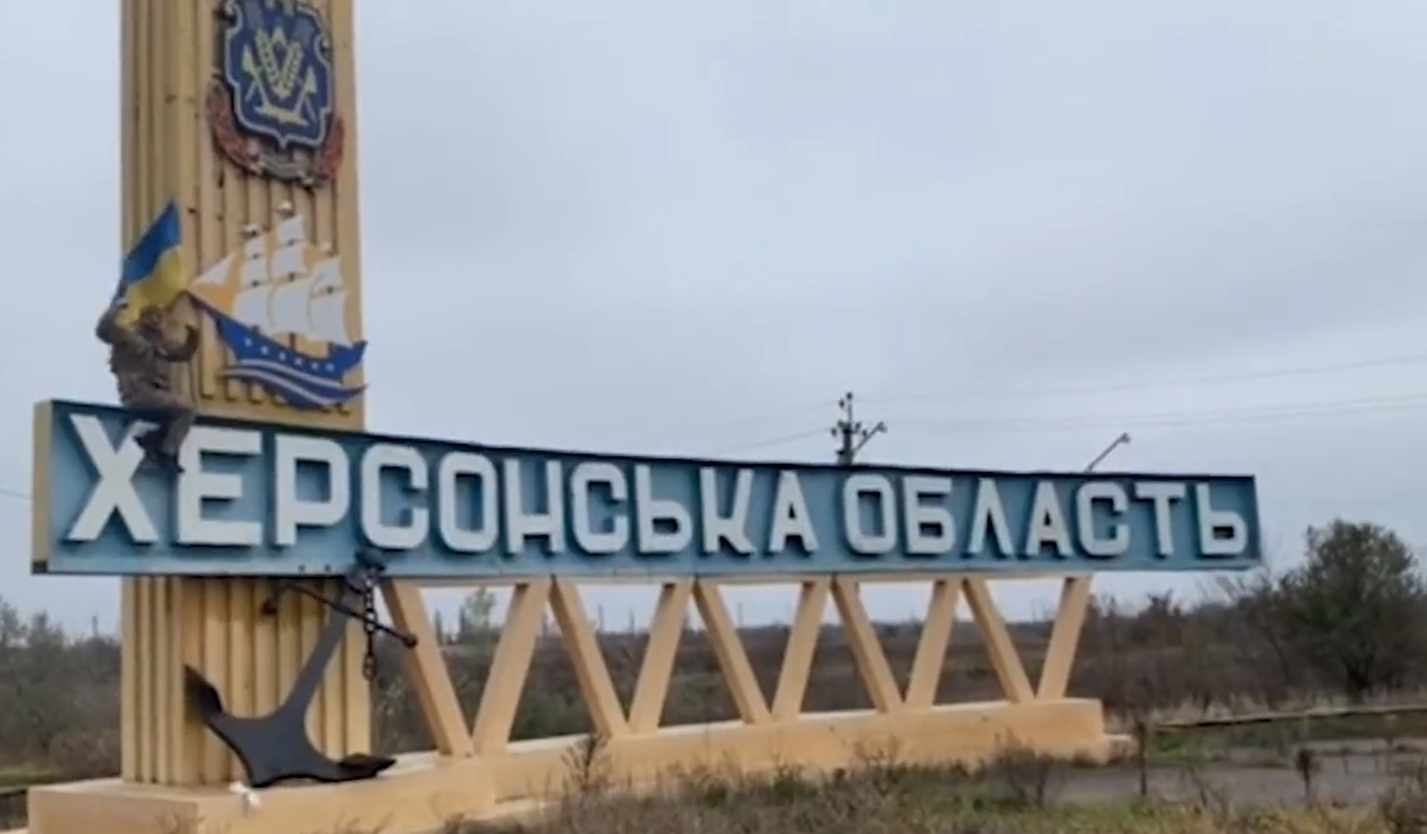
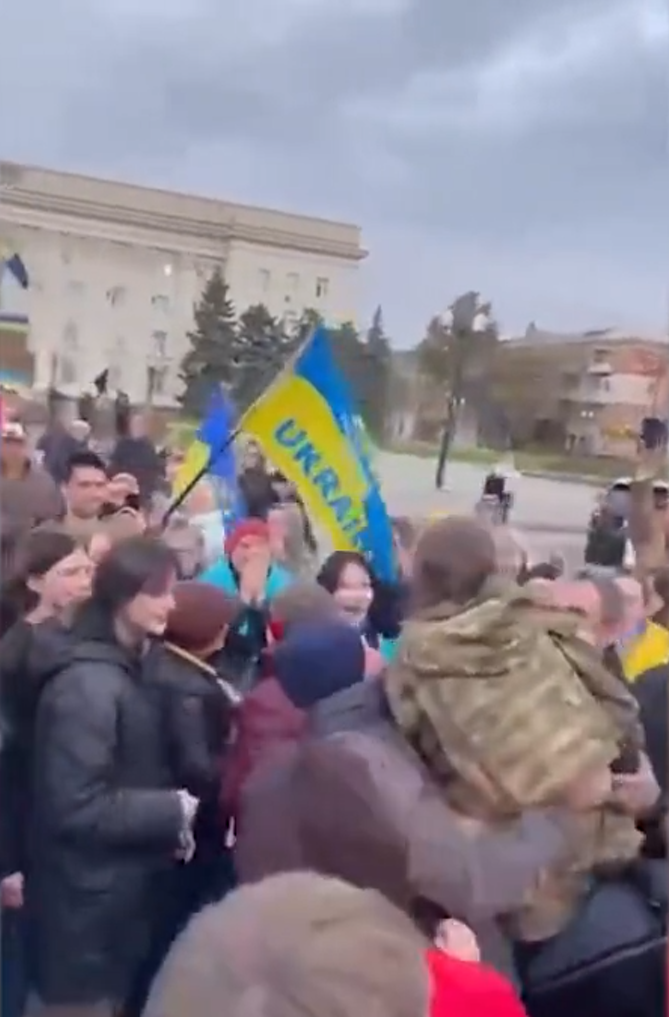
- Column of the Ukrainian tanks in Kherson Oblast; Volodymyr Zelenskyy confirming liberation of Kherson on radio; Civilians lifting female Ukrainian soldier on shoulders; Ukrainian soldier placing flag on the "Kherson Oblast" sign
- Date: 9–11 November 2022
- Location: South Ukraine
- Outcome: Liberation of Right-Bank Kherson Oblast and Mykolaiv Oblast (excluding the Kinburn Peninsula)

On 11 November 2022, the Armed Forces of Ukraine liberated and recaptured the city of Kherson and other areas of the Kherson Oblast and parts of the Mykolaiv Oblast on the right bank of the Dnipro River from Russian control. The Russian Armed Forces, which had occupied the city since 2 March 2022, withdrew and retreated to the left bank of the Kherson Oblast over the course of 9–11 November 2022.

The Ukrainian soldiers were greeted with cheers and large celebrations in the city square. The events were the culmination of the 2022 Kherson counteroffensive, and were seen as a large blow to Russian president Vladimir Putin, who had declared Kherson to be "part of Russia forever".

== Background ==
After the 24 February invasion of Ukraine, Russian forces surrounded the city of Kherson in late February, and occupied it on 2 March 2022, after heavy fighting the previous week.

In September 2022, Russia announced the annexation of the oblast along with three others, in a widely condemned move.

On 9 November, Russian general Sergey Surovikin announced the withdrawal of troops from Kherson and the right bank of the Dnieper. He claimed that the reasoning for this decision was that Kherson and nearby settlements were not able to be properly supplied and that civilians were in danger from Ukrainian shelling.

== Withdrawal and liberation ==
=== Ukrainian Armed Forces advancing ===
On 10 November, a video emerged appearing to show the Ukrainian flag flying in Snihurivka. Ukrainian forces had also regained control of the village of Kyselivka, fifteen kilometers northwest of Kherson. On the same day, the commander-in-chief of the Armed Forces of Ukraine Valerii Zaluzhnyi stated that Ukrainian forces had taken back 41 settlements near Kherson since 1 October.

Ukrainian officials estimated that half of the Russian soldiers had been withdrawn across the Dnipro by the evening of 10 November. In the early morning of 11 November, Russian infantrymen were seen walking across a pontoon bridge to the eastern shore. Ukrainian armour and columns closed in on Kherson proper as they moved past several towns, villages and suburbs, where they were greeted by cheering and flag-waving civilians.

=== Russian withdrawal efforts ===
"Ukrainian soldiers here are saying they have rather utterly defeated the Russian troops. The story goes that the Russians rushed to surrender. According to the Kremlin, the withdrawal was very well-organised, but the Ukrainians soldiers here paint quite a different picture."

— Nederlandse Omroep Stichting (15 November)

As Russian troops retreated across the river Dnipro, Ukrainian troops went further into Kherson Oblast and surrounding areas. The Russian Ministry of Defence claimed on 11 November 5 a.m. Moscow time (2 a.m. UTC) that all soldiers (approximately 30,000) and all military equipment had been successfully moved across the river in an orderly withdrawal. Several analysts and experts considered perfectly conducting such a large and complex manoeuvre in a matter of three days to be logistically impossible. Ukrainian defence minister Oleksii Reznikov told Reuters: 'It's not that easy to withdraw these troops from Kherson in one day or two days. As a minimum, [it will take] one week' to move them all (40,000 by his estimate).

On Russian social media, many troops appeared to be in panic as they sought to escape, with pro-Kremlin bloggers echoing panic, suggesting a collapse in morale and logistics. Many reports from journalists, Ukrainian civilians and authorities as well as individual Russian soldiers indicated that the withdrawal had been rather chaotic, with many Russian servicemen and materiel left behind on the right bank. Deutsche Welle reported that major equipment pieces such as anti-aircraft defence systems appeared to have been successfully transferred to the other bank, but this would leave troops stuck on the northern side vulnerable to Ukrainian artillery and drone attacks. Groups of Russian soldiers (some of them wounded) were reportedly captured, or voluntarily surrendered to advancing Ukrainian forces. Ukrainian official Serhiy Khlan stated that some Russian soldiers failed to leave Kherson, and changed into civilian clothing. One unidentified Russian soldier appeared to confirm that the last order his unit received was 'to change into civilian clothing and fuck off any way you want'. Some Russian soldiers reportedly drowned while trying to swim across the Dnipro. Ukrainian intelligence posted a Russian-language statement on social media, calling on remaining Russian soldiers to surrender. Footage on social media suggested that Ukrainian troops had captured several Russian tanks, armoured vehicles and crates of ammunition, contradicting the Russian Defence Ministry's statement that '[n]ot a single piece of military equipment or weaponry was left behind on the right [west] bank'.

=== Ukrainian Armed Forces entering Kherson ===
Ukrainian soldiers in cars entering the city centre of Kherson, welcomed by cheering civilians (11 November)

The Armed Forces of Ukraine entered the city on 11 November. Later that day, Ukrainian forces liberated Kherson and the rest of the right bank of Kherson Oblast. There were some fears that Russian forces might have laid a trap, therefore the ZSU advanced with some caution. As in other liberated areas, the arriving Ukrainians found mines and booby traps, which posed a danger to both soldiers and civilians. On 11 November, the Ukrainian military was working to clear them, but several people were wounded by such devices, and at least one was killed. As the ZSU moved into the city, no ambushes of any sort appeared to have been prepared, with some observers describing the disorderly retreat as a "rout".

When Ukrainian troops arrived, crowds of civilians gathered to welcome them, and celebrated the liberation. On Freedom Square (Ukrainian: Площа Свободи, romanized: Plóshcha Svobódy), civilians were seen chanting "Glory to the ZSU [Ukraine's armed forces]", hugging soldiers, singing songs and waving Ukrainian flags. One female soldier of the ZSU was lifted up by two men on their shoulders, and then tossed into the air to express their gratitude. Cars took to the streets honking their horns, while residents tore down pro-Russian propaganda posters. Similarly in Bilozerka, a town on the western edge of Kherson city, residents tore down propaganda billboards with a young girl holding a Russian flag, which read: "Russia is here forever (Россия здесь навсегда)". Kherson residents were seen dancing in the darkness around a bonfire singing "Chervona Kalyna", a Ukrainian patriotic song that had been banned by Russian occupation authorities for nine months. Following liberation, Ukrainian president Volodymyr Zelenskyy called it a "historic day".

== Aftermath ==
=== Military and political impact ===
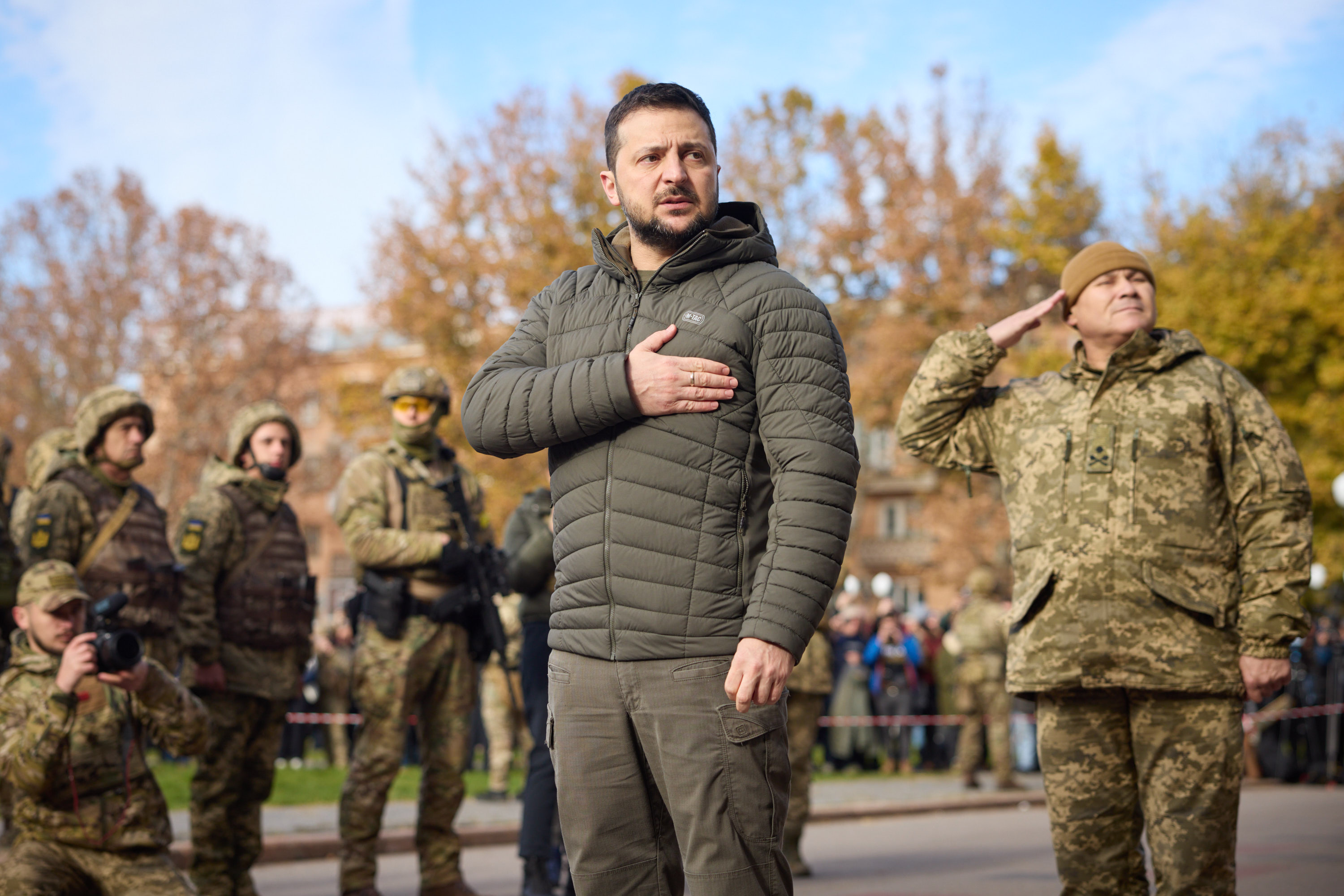
Ukrainian president Volodymyr Zelenskyy, participating in reraising the Ukrainian flag while visiting liberated Kherson, on 14 November 2022

By withdrawing, Russian forces ceded control of about 40% of Kherson Oblast to Ukraine. The loss of Kherson has been widely regarded as a significant blow to Vladimir Putin, who on 30 September said that Kherson would be "part of Russia forever". On 12 November, the occupying forces declared Henichesk, a port city on the Sea of Azov, to be the "temporary administrative capital of the Kherson region". During the withdrawal, Russian soldiers took the bones of the 18th century Prince Grigory Aleksandrovich Potemkin, who was considered the modern founder of the city, from Kherson's St. Catherine's Cathedral.

Initially, most of the city's inhabitants were euphoric, celebrating the Russian withdrawal in public, and welcoming the Ukrainian forces as liberators, while others were worried about the time ahead. A Kherson resident said: "I want to celebrate, but something tells me it is not over yet. The Russians can't be giving up so easily, not after everything that has happened. I am scared for the winter and worry the city will become a battle ground. We will be in the firing line." Military analysts stated that there was a danger of Russian artillery shelling Kherson from the eastern bank of the Dnipro.

On 14 November Zelenskyy made an unannounced visit to Kherson and spoke to a crowd of several hundred residents, saying "We are, step by step, coming to all of our country...I am happy we are in Kherson." The NOS described the situation on the ground as "a sort of unspoken ceasefire. That both belligerents have taken a kind of break, and are not extensively shooting at each other." Aleksandr Dugin, the ideologue of Russian nationalism and Eurasianism, openly criticized Vladimir Putin for failing to defend "Russian cities" such as Kherson.

In December 2023, a declassified American intelligence assessment found with "high confidence" that Russian military officials proposed delaying the withdrawal from Kherson until after the 2022 United States elections "to avoid giving a named US political party a perceived win before the election."

=== Damage to infrastructure and logistics ===
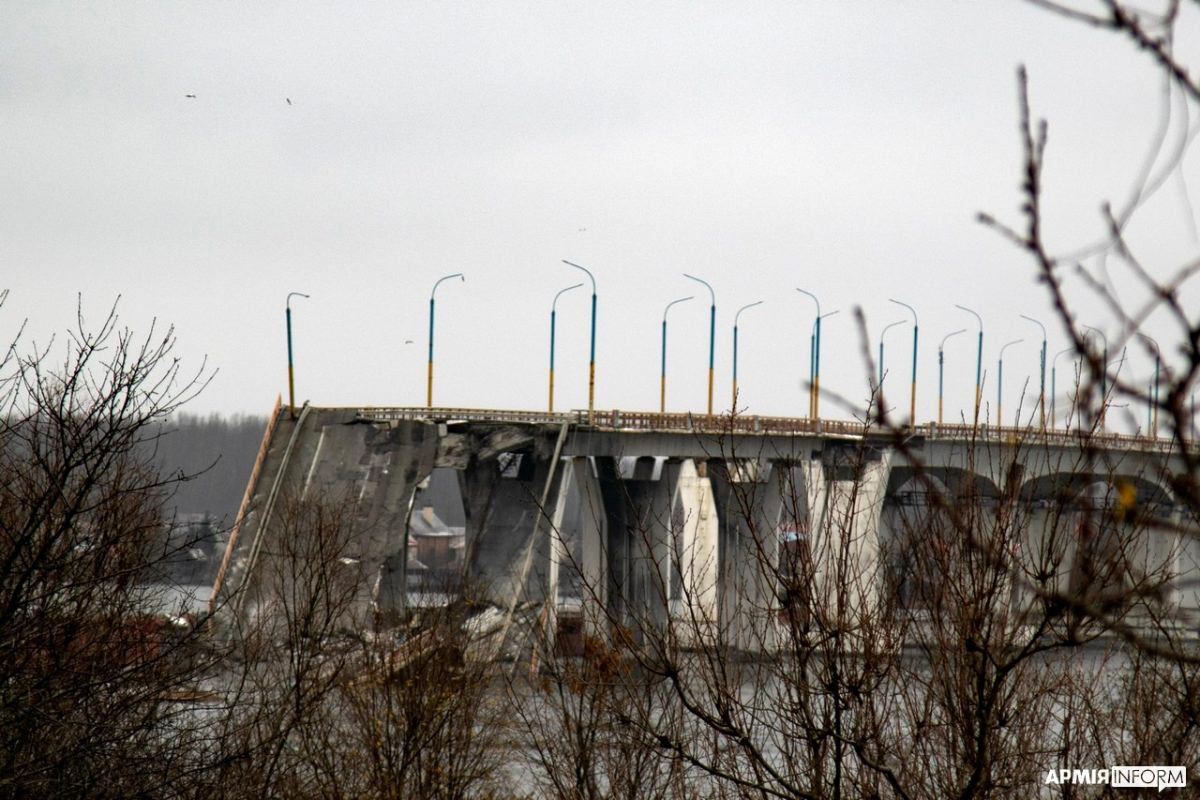
Remains of Antonivka Road Bridge

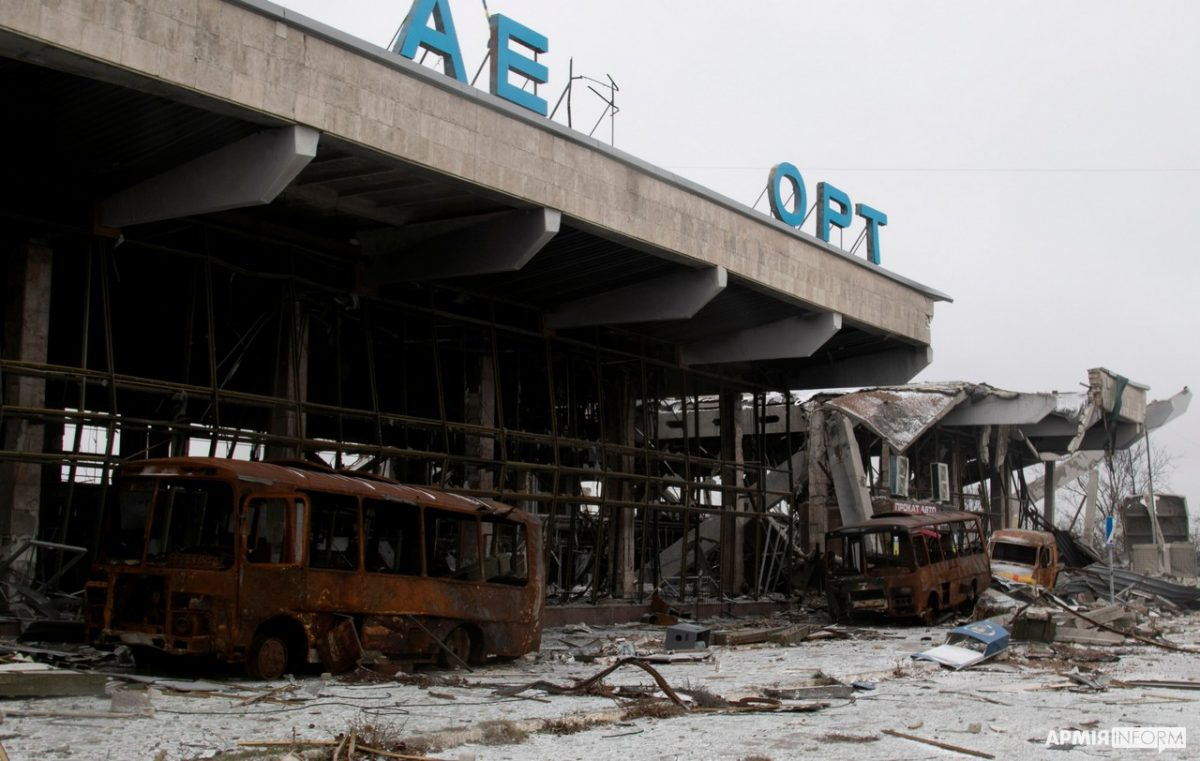
Ruins of Kherson International Airport

Satellite images from Maxar Technologies showed that major damage to infrastructure had been done during the withdrawal from Kherson, including the destruction of at least seven bridges, four of them across the river Dnipro, within 24 hours. Central part of the Antonivka Road Bridge were destroyed; according to a reporter from the pro-Russian newspaper Komsomolskaya Pravda at the scene, "[t]hey were likely blown up during the withdrawal of the Russian group of forces from the right bank to the left". Upstream, the Kakhovka Dam was also damaged; as of 11 November, Ukrainian forces were still not in control of the dam, although they had retaken the village of Tyahynka, located 20 kilometres to the west.

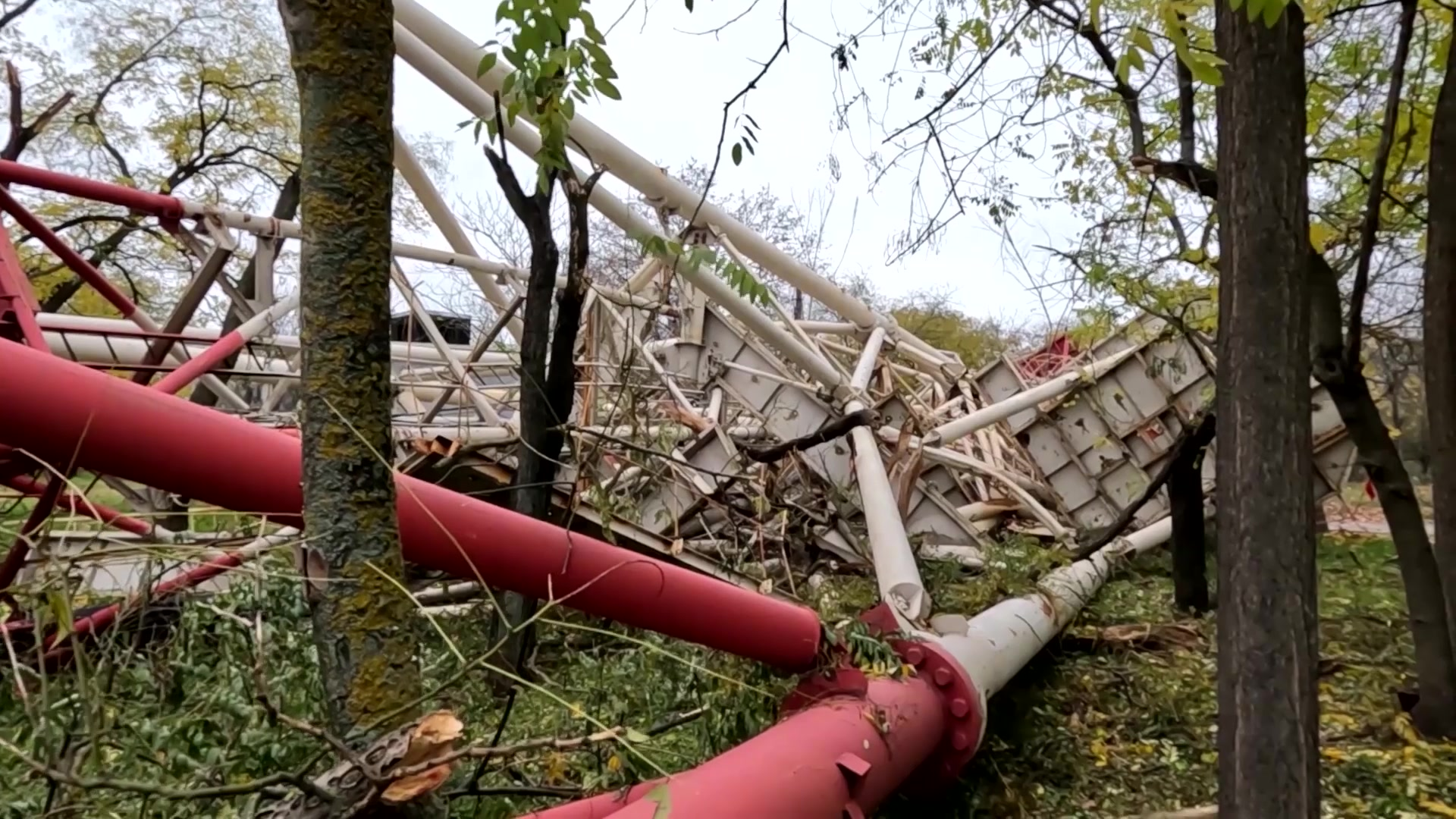
Kherson TV Tower blown up by Russian army before retreat

Much of Kherson city's electricity, internet and water supply networks had broken down by the time Ukraine re-established control. President Zelenskyy said on 12 November: "Before fleeing from Kherson, the occupiers destroyed all the critical infrastructure: communications, water, heat, electricity." Kherson TV Tower, Kherson combined heat and power plant and other energy infrastructure facilities were blown up.

The occupied Kherson region is home to part of the North Crimean Canal, which, prior to Russia's annexation of Crimea, provided 85% of Crimea's drinking and agriculture water. Ukraine shut down the canal in 2014 soon after Russia annexed Crimea. Russia restored the flow of water in March 2022. Regaining control of Kherson means Ukraine could once again cut off water to Crimea.

=== Damage to cultural heritage ===
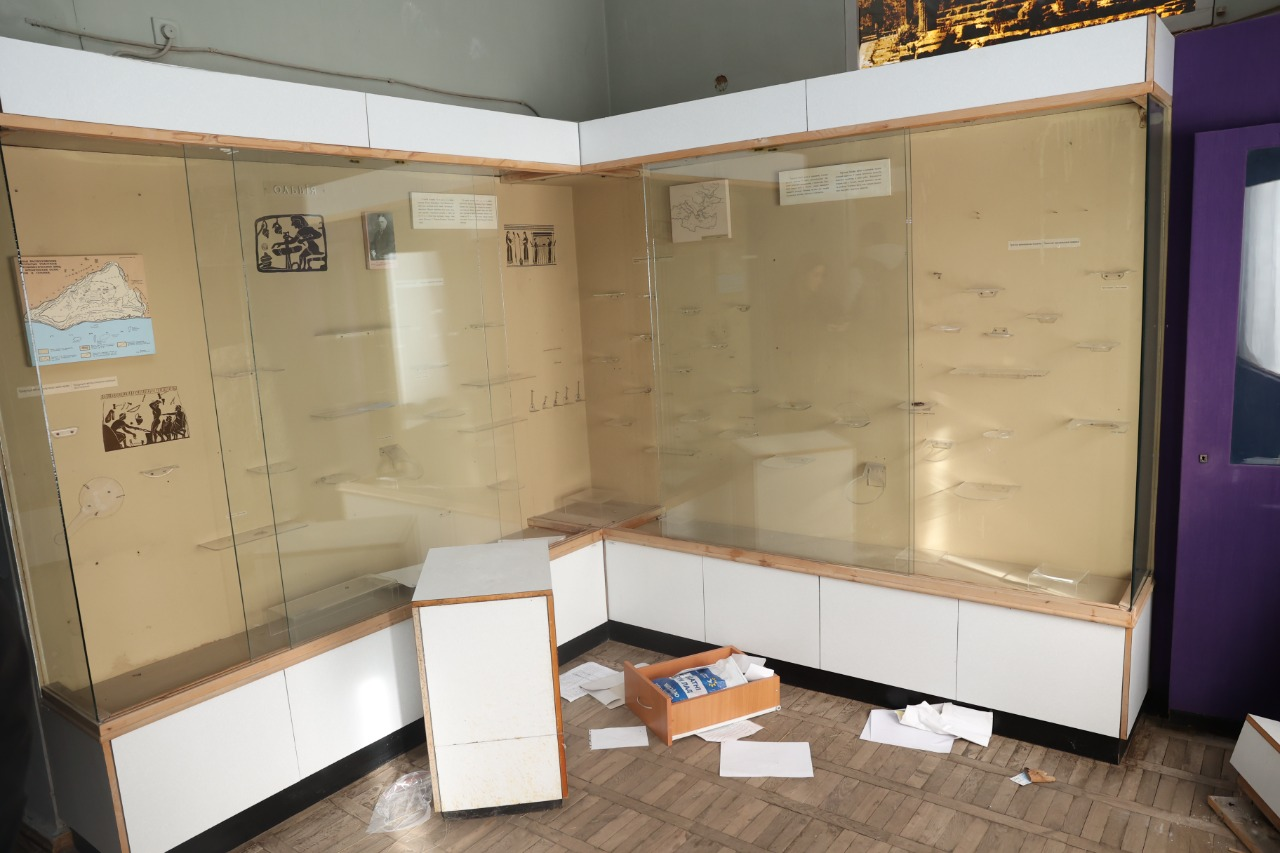
Looted Local History Museum

Before retreating from the city, Russian forces looted its main museums: the Local History Museum and the Art Museum. Their items were transported to Crimean museums. In addition, Russian army took away monuments to Alexander Suvorov, Fyodor Ushakov, Vasily Margelov, Grigory Potemkin and remains of the latter.

=== Demographics ===
==== Changes during occupation ====
Before the war, Kherson had some 300,000 inhabitants, but by the end of the Russian occupation, only about 80,000 were left. Many civilians had fled, while some were killed during the Russian occupation. In late October 2022, the Russian military 'evacuated' at least 70,000 civilians from Kherson to the eastern bank of the river Dnipro; Ukrainian authorities alleged that these relocations were forced, and called them 'deportations'. After Ukraine retook the city, some 25 people had died due to exploding mines and munitions by 19 November.

The Russian language was still commonly used for communication within Kherson city for historical demographical reasons, but due to the fact that many civilians were mistreated and felt humiliated by Russian soldiers, some residents expressed shame at speaking Russian after everything that had happened. In the short film Occupied: Family secretly film life in Russian-occupied Ukraine for BBC News, local Kherson journalist Dmytro Bahnenko stated: "After everything that happened in Bucha and what we witnessed, I don't want to speak Russian anymore."

==== Post-occupation voluntary evacuations ====
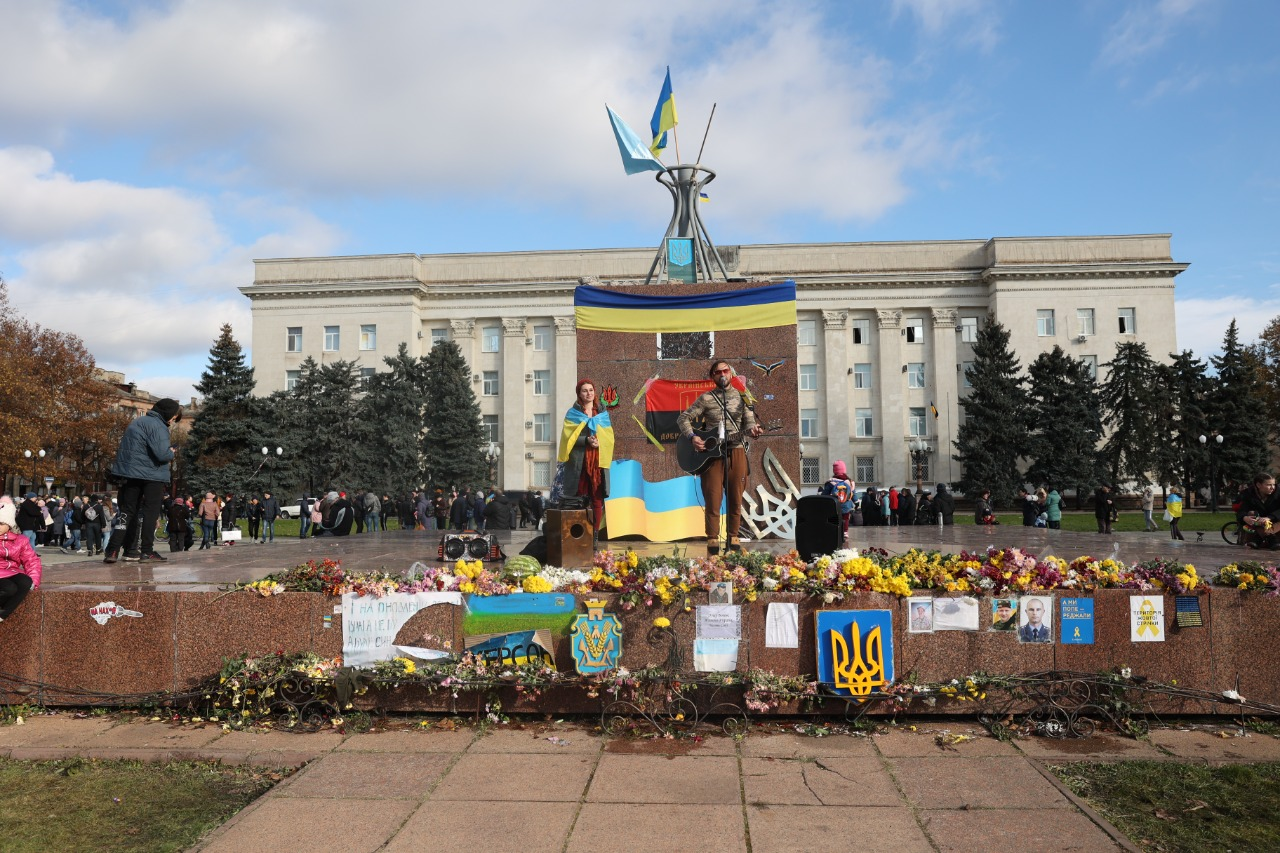
View of Freedom Square in Kherson on 19 November 2022

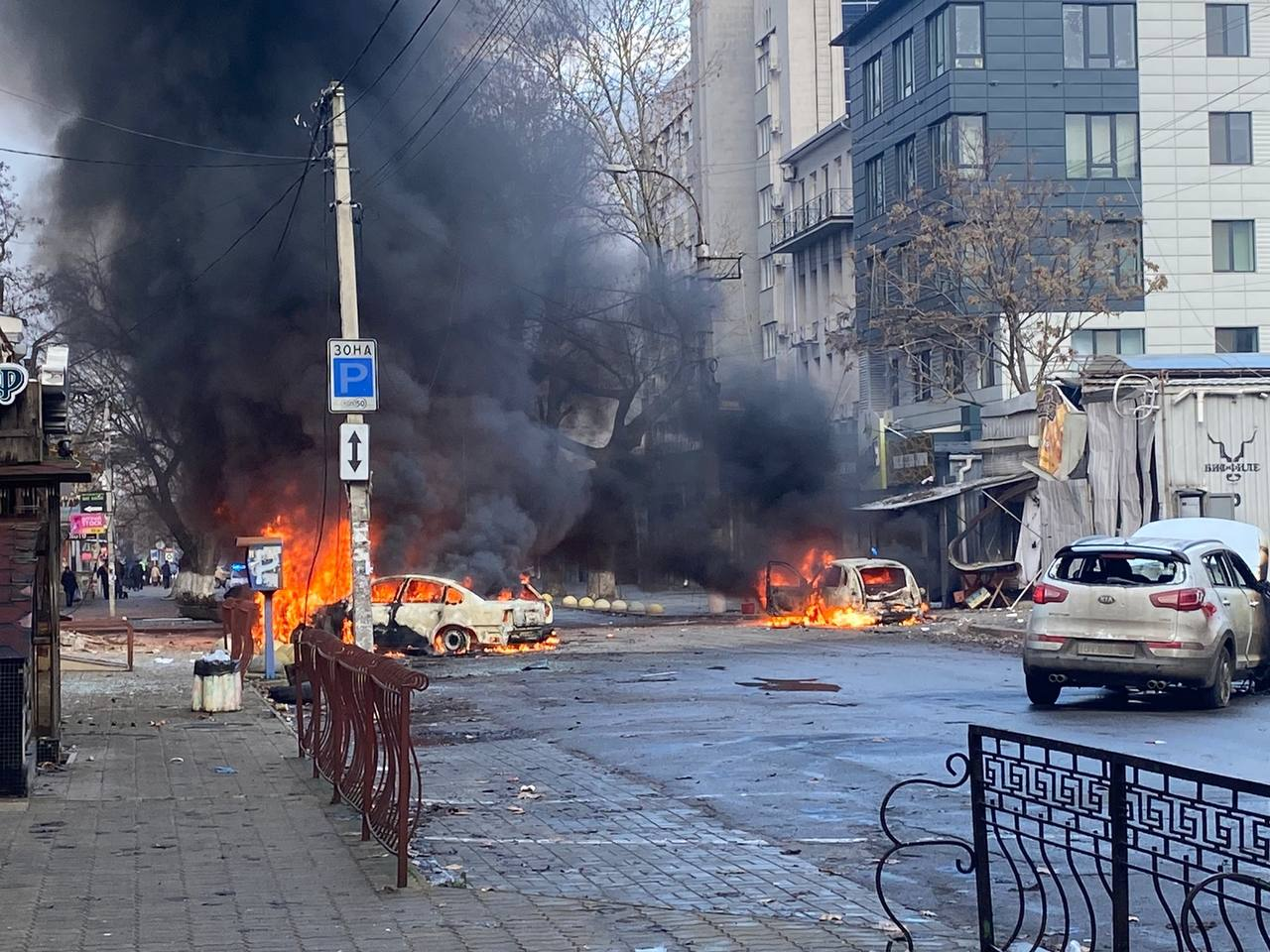
Kherson after shelling by the Russian army on 24 December 2022

Yaroslav Yanushevych, the new Ukrainian governor of Kherson Oblast since August 2022, stated on 18 November: "[Evacuating residents] depends on whether there will be electricity. The president has said very clearly that we should throw all our resources into restoring the electricity supply". Kherson district head Mykhailo Lynetskiy said there were no plans yet to evacuate the city's residents, but that there was a major risk the electricity and water repairs could not be completed in the short term, and inhabitants would be better off trying to find winter accommodation elsewhere in the country: "As a Kherson city native, I categorically advise people to leave the city for safer places for the duration of the winter period."

By 21 November 2022, Ukrainian authorities had initiated efforts to facilitate voluntary evacuations of Kherson residents who desired to winter elsewhere until the city was more secure, with deputy prime minister Iryna Vereshchuk saying: 'Currently, we are not talking about forced evacuation. But even in the case of voluntary evacuation, the state bears responsibility for transportation. People must be taken to the place where they will spend the winter."

=== Demining operations ===
Governor of Mykolaiv Oblast Vitalii Kim warned that there were still "a lot of mines in the liberated territories and settlements", and: "Don't go there for no reason. There are casualties." Yaroslav Yanushevich, Kherson Oblast military chair, stated that efforts were made to return the city to "normal life", with police urging internally displaced people "not to rush to return home until stabilisation measures are completed", such as demining operations.

The Ukrainian Deminers Association NGO told The Guardian: "We can't make forecasts yet, as the clearing procedure has only started, but potentially the region of Kherson could be most mined region in the country and unfortunately Ukraine could soon rank first in the world for number of casualties caused by mines." The removal of mines and tripwires across the oblast and the rest of the recaptured territories of Ukraine was expected to take months if not years.

== Reactions ==
In response to the withdrawal of its military forces from the city, the Russian government reiterated its claim that Kherson Oblast remains a federal subject of Russia.

The withdrawal was praised amongst NATO members, with President of Turkey Recep Tayyip Erdoğan characterizing it as "positive and important" and that he would continue diplomacy with Russia. In the lead up to Russian troops' departure, Secretary General of NATO Jens Stoltenberg reiterated the group's support for Ukraine and that the withdrawal would "be another victory for Ukraine."

Commenting on the withdrawal during a press conference, US President Joe Biden said that the decision to withdraw shows that Russia's military has "real problems."

== See also ==
- Raccoon of Kherson, a raccoon stolen by Russian occupiers during the withdrawal
- Russian occupation of Kherson Oblast
- Russian occupation of Mykolaiv Oblast
- 2022 Ukrainian southern counteroffensive
- Southern Ukraine offensive
- Russian annexation of Donetsk, Kherson, Luhansk and Zaporizhzhia oblasts
- Annexation of Crimea by the Russian Federation
- 2022–23 Dnipro River skirmishes
