= UAnimals =

Ukrainian animal welfare organization

UAnimals is a Ukrainian animal welfare organization founded in 2016. The organization is actively involved in sheltering and rehabilitating animals during the Russian invasion of Ukraine.

== History ==
UAnimals was established in 2016 by Oleksandr Todorchuk. The organization has advocated against the exploitation of animals in circuses in Ukraine, which led to the ban of circuses in several Ukrainian cities. It also advocates to end the use of fur, and is a member of the Fur Free Alliance and the International Anti-Fur Coalition. As a result of these activities, several Ukrainian clothing brands pledged not to use fur in their collections.

Since 2017, the All-Ukrainian March for Animal Rights has been held annually at the initiative of UAnimals. In 2021, the event took place simultaneously in 30 cities, including Lviv, Kharkiv, Ivano-Frankivsk, Odesa, Dnipro and Chernihiv.

=== 2022 and Russian invasion of Ukraine ===
After the 2022 Russian invasion of Ukraine, UAnimals began working to shelter and rehabilitate animals negatively impacted by the conflict. The organization also coordinates volunteers to help animals abandoned in zoos and farms during the invasion. Its activities involve evacuating animals from combat zones, and providing food and supplies to shelters, zoos, and rehabilitation centers.
