= Zubovo, Vladimir Oblast =

Zubovo Зубово
- Village
- Location within Vladimir Oblast Location within Russia
- Coordinates: 55°58′N 40°10′E
- Country: Russia
- Region: Vladimir Oblast
- District: Sobinsky District
- Time zone: UTC+3:00

Zubovo (Russian: Зубово) is a rural locality (a village) in Aserkhovskoye Rural Settlement, Sobinsky District, Vladimir Oblast, Russia. The population was 3 as of 2010.

== Geography ==
Zubovo is located 17 km southeast of Sobinka (the district's administrative centre) by road. Karpovo is the nearest rural locality.
