= Zubovo, Chagodoshchensky District, Vologda Oblast =

Zubovo Зубово
- Village
- Location within Vologda Oblast Location within Russia
- Coordinates: 58°59′N 35°32′E
- Country: Russia
- Region: Vologda Oblast
- District: Chagodoshchensky District
- Time zone: UTC+3:00

Zubovo (Russian: Зубово) is a rural locality (a village) in Pokrovskoye Rural Settlement, Chagodoshchensky District, Vologda Oblast, Russia. The population was 5 as of 2002.

== Geography ==
Zubovo is located 35 km (22 mi) southeast of Chagoda (the district's administrative centre) by road. Zaluzhye is the nearest rural locality.
