= Zubof Rock =

Island in Sitka, Alaska, United States

Zubof
- Interactive map of Zubof

Geography
- Location: Sitka City and Borough, Alaska
- Coordinates: 57°17′32″N 134°55′52″W
- Archipelago: Alexander Archipelago
- Length: 0.2273 mi (0.3658 km)

Administration
- United States

Zubof Rock (also known as Zuboff Rock) is a small island near Sitka, Alaska, United States, off the northeast coast of Baranof Island. Located in an area of Kelp Bay known as The Basin, it was entered into the United States Geological Survey's Geographic Names Information System on March 31, 1981. Its name dates back to 1895 as Zuboff, which was a Russian surname, as reported by Lieutenant Commander J. F. Moser of the United States Navy.

Typically seen at low tides, Zubof Rock is about 400 yards (365.8 m) long from north to south. It is about 0.375 miles (0.6 km) southwest of Crow Island.
