= Zubovo, Chishminsky District, Republic of Bashkortostan =

Zubovo Зубово
- Village
- Location within Bashkortostan Location within Russia
- Coordinates: 54°37′N 55°16′E
- Country: Russia
- Region: Bashkortostan
- District: Chishminsky District
- Time zone: UTC+5:00

Zubovo (Russian: Зубово) is a rural locality (a village) in Yeremeyevsky Selsoviet, Chishminsky District, Bashkortostan, Russia. The population was 6 as of 2010. There is 1 street.

== Geography ==
Zubovo is located 9 km northwest of Chishmy (the district's administrative centre) by road. Kavetka is the nearest rural locality.
