= Taigan Reservoir =

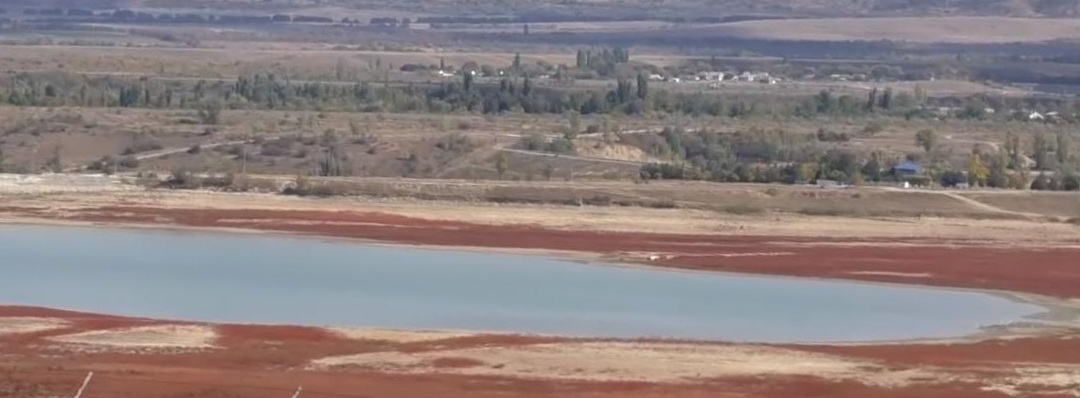

Taigan Reservoir is located in Crimea.
