= Zubov's method =

Zubov's method is a technique for computing the basin of attraction for a set of ordinary differential equations (a dynamical system). The domain of attraction is the set $\{x:\, v(x)<1\}$, where $v(x)$ is the solution to a partial differential equation known as the Zubov equation. Zubov's method can be used in a number of ways.

== Statement ==
Zubov's theorem states that:

If $x' = f(x), t \in \R$ is an ordinary differential equation in $\R^n$ with $f(0)=0$, a set $A$ containing 0 in its interior is the domain of attraction of zero if and only if there exist continuous functions $v, h$ such that:
- $v(0) = h(0) = 0$, $0 < v(x) < 1$ for $x \in A \setminus \{0\}$, $h > 0$ on $\R^n \setminus \{0\}$
- for every $\gamma_2 > 0$ there exist $\gamma_1 > 0, \alpha_1 > 0$ such that $v(x) > \gamma_1, h(x) > \alpha_1$ , if $||x||>\gamma_2$
- $v(x_n) \rightarrow 1$ for $x_n \rightarrow \partial A$ or $||x_n|| \rightarrow \infty$
- $\nabla v(x) \cdot f(x) = -h(x)(1-v(x)) \sqrt{1+||f(x)||^2}$

If f is continuously differentiable, then the differential equation has at most one continuously differentiable solution satisfying $v(0) = 0$.
