= Fyodor Zubov =

Russian painter

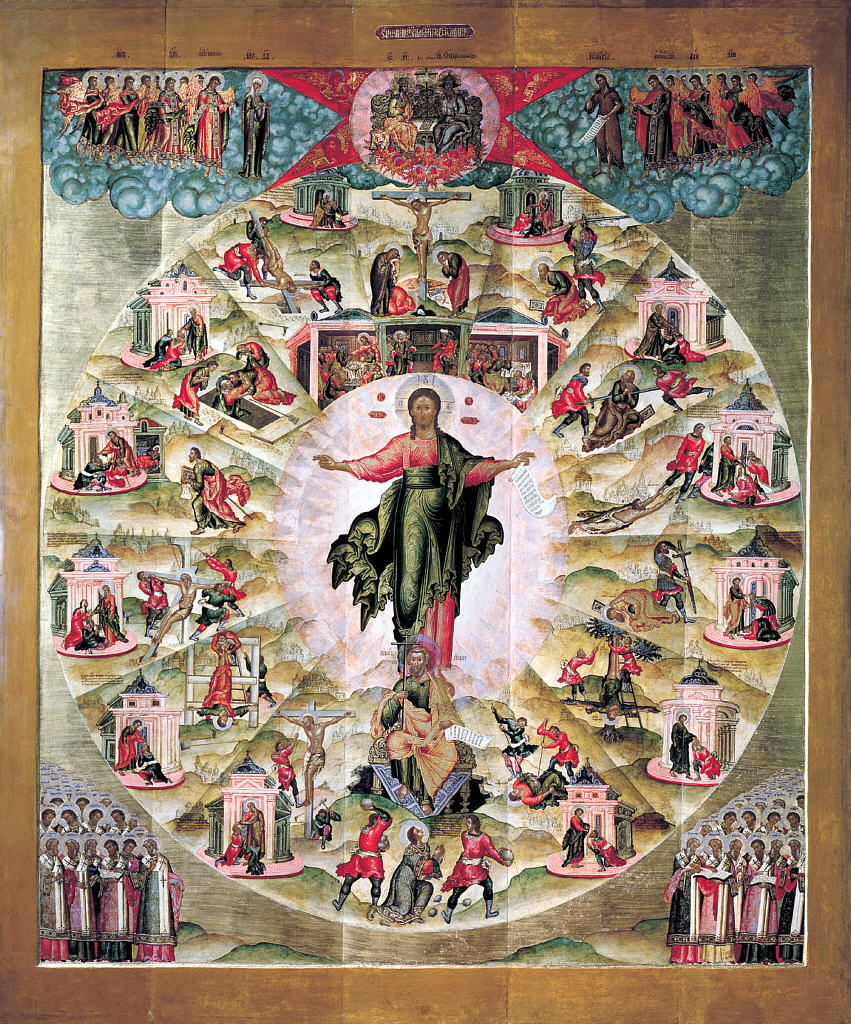
Ministry of the Apostles by Fyodor Zubov

Fyodor Evtikhievich Zubov (Russian: Фёдор Евти́хиевич Зу́бов; 1615 – November 3, 1689), was a Russian painter, engraver, miniaturist and illuminator.

== Biography ==
Zubov was born in Solikamsk, a member of the noble Zubov family. He began working in Veliky Ustyug and Yaroslavl. In 1662 he moved to Moscow where he worked with Simon Ushakov. His work included icons, illuminated manuscripts, drawings for engravings, and wall paintings. When Ushakov died in 1686, Zubov took over as the Director of the Imperial Workshop of Icon Painters in the Kremlin Armoury. He died in Moscow, in 1689.
