= Pody =

Pody may refer to:

== Geography ==
- Pody, Russia
- Pody, Lozova Raion, Kharkiv Oblast, Ukraine
- Pody, Chuhuiv Raion, Kharkiv Oblast, Ukraine
- Pody, Kherson Oblast, Ukraine
- Pody, Zaporizhzhia Raion, Zaporizhzhia Oblast, Ukraine
- Ternovi Pody, Ukraine

== People ==
- Mark Pody (born 1956), American politician
- Pody Poe (1932–2006), American criminal

== See also ==
- Podi (disambiguation)
