= Kostohryzove =

Kostohryzove (Ukrainian: Костогризове) may refer to:

- Kostohryzove, Kakhovka Raion, Kherson Oblast
- Kostohryzove, Kherson Raion, Kherson Oblast
