= Kozachi Laheri, Kherson Raion, Kherson Oblast =

Kozachi Laheri Коза́чі Лагері
- Village
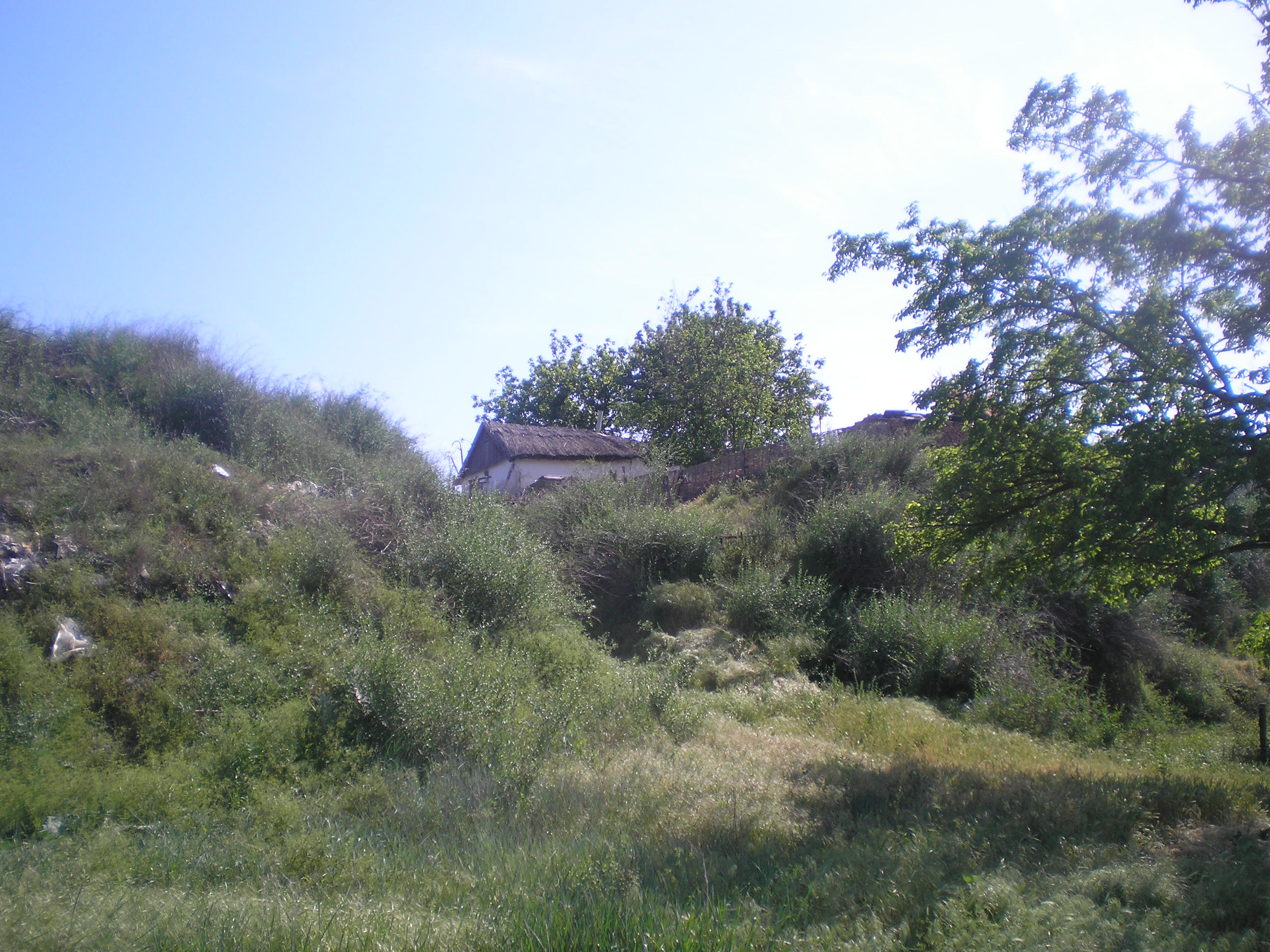
- Interactive map of Kozachi Laheri
- Location of Kozachi Laheri within Kherson Oblast Kozachi Laheri (Ukraine)
- Coordinates: 46.707°N 32.983°E
- Country: Ukraine
- Oblast: Kherson
- Raion: Kherson
- Hromada: Oleshky
- Founded: 1758

Population (2001)
  - Total: 3,726
- Time zone: UTC+2
  - Summer (DST): UTC+3 (EEST)
- Postal code: 75110
- Area code: +380 5542

Kozachi Laheri (Ukrainian: Козачі Лагері, lit. 'Cossack Camps') is a village on the left bank of the Dnipro River in Kherson Raion, Kherson Oblast, in southern Ukraine.

Administratively, the village belongs to Oleshky urban hromada, one of the hromadas (communities) of Ukraine, which is centered in the nearby town of Oleshky. Kozachi Laheri has been on the line of contact of the Dnipro campaign during the Russian invasion of Ukraine.

== History ==
During the Russian Empire, Kozachi Laheri was the administrative center of the Kozacho-Laherska Volost, a volost of the Dneprovsky Uyezd. Its name literally translates from Ukrainian to English as "Cossack Camps". In 1886, Kozachi Laheri had a population of 2,665. The village had an Orthodox church, two stores, a school and an annual fair.

During the Ukrainian War of Independence, from 1917 to 1920, it passed between various factions. Afterwards it was administratively part of the Mykolaiv Governorate of Ukraine.

As a result of the Russian invasion of Ukraine, Kozachi Laheri was occupied by Russia in February 2022. Russian forces shelled a kindergarten in the village on the night of 4 May 2022.

The village was partially flooded when the Kakhovka Dam collapsed on 6 June 2023. Ukrainian special forces conducted raids in the village in August 2023 during the 2023 Ukrainian counteroffensive.

== Demographics ==
According to the 1989 Soviet census, the population of Kozachi Laheri was 3,880, of which 1,742 were men and 2,138 were women.

According to the 2001 Ukrainian census, the village had a population of 3,726. 94.17% of residents were native Ukrainian speakers, 5.43% were native Russian speakers, 0.05% were native Belarusian speakers, 0.05% were native Romanian speakers, 0.03% were native Hungarian speakers, and the remaining 0.27% spoke other languages.

== See also ==
- Russian occupation of Kherson Oblast
