= Battle of Krynky =

Battle during the Russo-Ukrainian war

- Part of Dnieper campaign (2022–present)
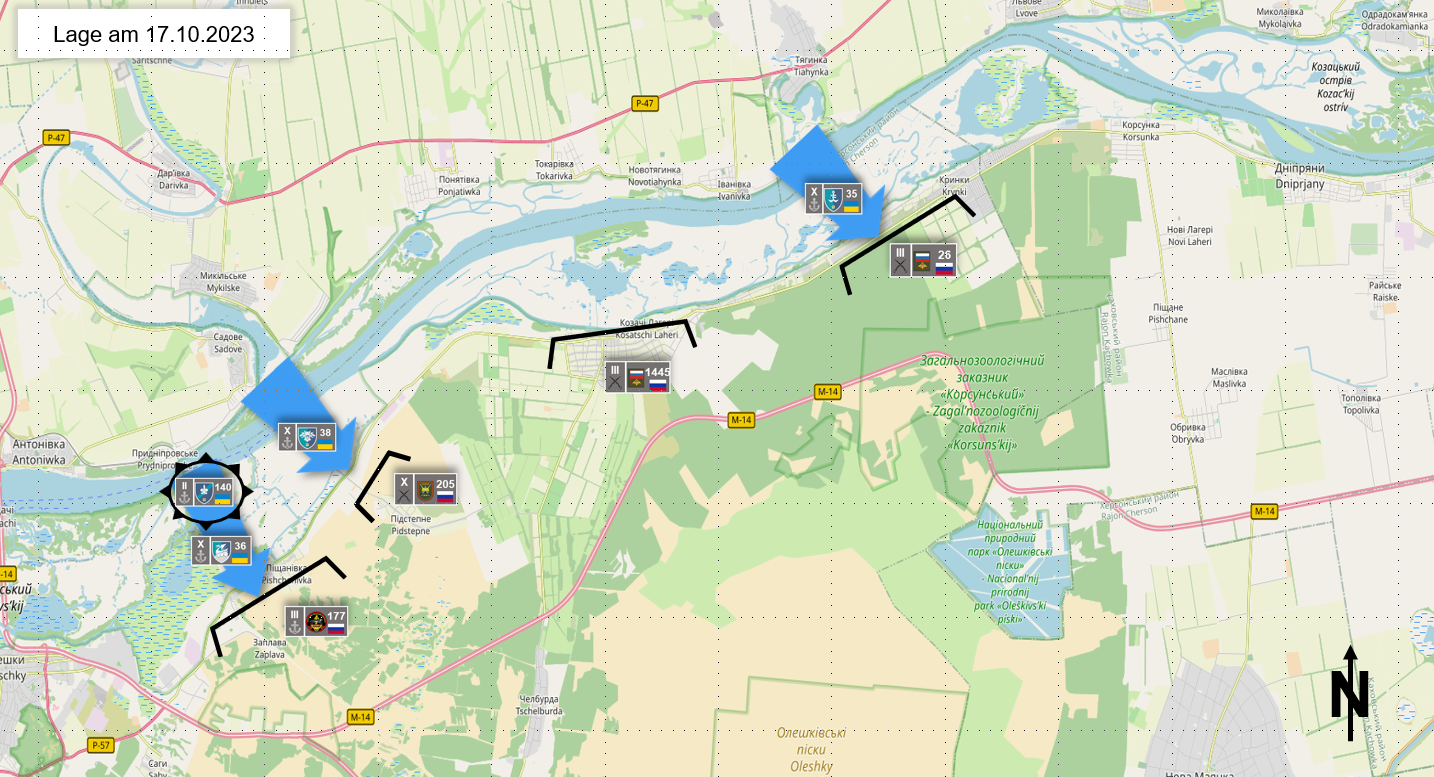
- Map of the situation around Krynky as of 17 October, 2023. Ukrainian units advance across the Dnieper River to conduct small raids. The numbers are unit numbers.
Date	20 October 2023 – 17 July 2024 (8 months, 3 weeks and 6 days)
Location	Krynky, Kherson Oblast, Ukraine
Result	Russian victory

Belligerents
Russia	Ukraine

Commanders and leaders
(Russia) Oleg Makarevich (Russia) Mikhail Teplinsky	Yurii Sodol

Units involved
Russian Armed Forces; Russian Navy; 810th Guards Naval Infantry Brigade; Russian Ground Forces; 18th Combined Arms Army; 70th Motor Rifle Division; Russian Airborne Forces; 104th Guards Air Assault Division	Armed Forces of Ukraine; Ukrainian Navy; Ukrainian Marine Corps; 35th Marine Brigade; 36th Marine Brigade; 37th Marine Brigade; 38th Marine Brigade; Territorial Defence Forces; 34th Coastal Defense Brigade; 39th Coastal Defense Brigade; Special Operations Forces; 73rd Naval Special Operations Center; Security Service of Ukraine; 414th Strike UAV Brigade

Casualties and losses
Ukrainian claims: 1,216 killed 2,217 wounded 24 tanks destroyed 48 armored vehicles destroyed 89 artillery systems and mortars destroyed 9 multiple launch rocket systems destroyed	According to UALosses: 353 killed 703 missing 58 captured Per The Telegraph: more than 1,000 ″feared killed″

The Battle of Krynky was a battle waged between Russian and Ukrainian armed forces over the village of Krynky, which lasted from 20 October 2023 to 17 July 2024, when the Ukrainian Armed Forces retreated across the Dnieper River.

== Background ==
During the first day of the Russian invasion of Ukraine, the village of Krynky was occupied by the Russian Armed Forces.

== Timeline of the battle ==
=== 2023 ===
In September 2023 the Katran group of troops was formed as part of the Ukrainian armed forces to conduct an offensive operation on the left bank of the Dnieper River. Initially comprising only two TDF brigades as well as SOF and HUR units, it was expanded to include all of the Ukrainian Marine Corps. The purpose of the operation was to divert the troops of the Russian Armed Forces from Donbas to the southern front, consisting of the following objectives:

- Objective minimum: occupation of the defensive line along the left bank of the Dnieper River from Kinburn spit to Kakhovka. Cut the Russian logistics on the M14 highway.
- Objective maximum: Establishing control over a part of the left bank of the Kherson region from Antonovsky Bridge to Perekop, opening the path to Crimea.

On 18 October Russian milbloggers started reporting that small Ukrainian units had crossed the river around 17 October and firefights were ongoing in the area of Pishchanivka and Poima, 22km south of Krynky. Sources also reported that Ukrainian raids were carried out against Russian troops in Krynky and Kazatsky Island.

On October 20 AFU troops landed in Krynky. The amphibious operation proved to be challenging, with Ukrainian forces being attacked midstream or even before crossing the river.

As the battle progressed, by December the village of Krynky became almost completely destroyed, with Russian airstrikes turning the riverbank "into a mass of mud and splintered trees."

=== 2024 ===
In May 2024 it was rumored that the Ukrainian army would abandon Krynky. This was denied by the Head of Communications of the Defense Forces of the South Dmitry Pletenchuk.

On 16 July 2024, it became known that Ukrainian units had withdrawn from Krynky. According to the military in this area, it happened already "a few weeks ago." After that, the Ukrainian Armed Forces reported that the main positions of the Ukrainian military "were destroyed by intense, combined, and prolonged enemy fire" of the Russian Armed Forces.

== Casualties ==
=== Ukrainian ===
As a result of the fighting (from October 2023 to the end of June 2024), 788 Ukrainian servicemen were reported by Ukrainian sources to be missing in action. At the same time, the number of dead soldiers who were taken out identified and buried there amounted to 262 people during this period.

On 19 July 2024, The Telegraph reported that more than 1,000 Ukrainian soldiers were thought to have been killed during the battle.

On 26 July 2024, Suspilne reported that many of the relatives of the missing soldiers were struggling to obtain information from the Ukrainian military about them.

As of 25 October 2026, UALosses has confirmed the names of 353 Ukrainian soldiers killed, 703 missing and 58 captured during the battle.

Evacuating bodies from the left bank presented a real challenge for the attacking side, with some bodies not being evacuated for months.

=== Russian ===
According to the UK Defense Ministry, Russian casualties in the battle included a large number of elite units like marines or airborne troops.

According to the Ukrainian Marine Corps, Russian losses included 1,216 killed, 2,217 wounded, 24 tanks, 48 armored vehicles, 89 artillery systems and mortars, and nine multiple launch rocket systems.

Dmytro Lykhovyi, the spokesman for the Tavria Operational Group, claimed that Russian equipment losses were 4-5 times higher than Ukrainian equipment losses.

In November 2023, Major General Vladimir Zavadsky, deputy commander of the 14th Army Corps, was killed near Krynky.
