= Revanche Tactical Group =

Ukrainian military volunteer unit

- Тактична група «Реванш»
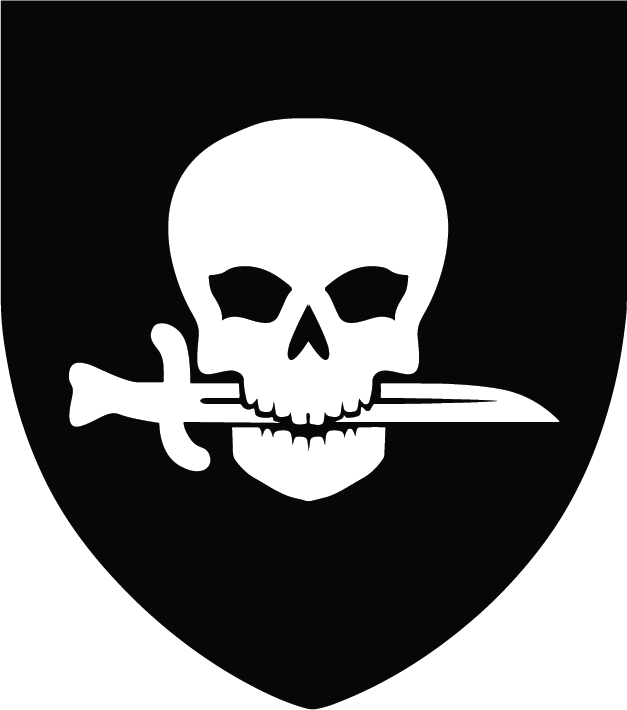
- Insignia of the Revanche Tactical Group
- Founded: 28 February 2022
- Country: Ukraine
- Allegiance: Ministry of Defence
- Branch: Main Directorate of Intelligence
- Type: Volunteer special operations unit
- Role: Reconnaissance, assault operations and sabotage
- Part of: International Legion of the Main Directorate of Intelligence (since August 2025)
- Engagements: Russo-Ukrainian War; Russian invasion of Ukraine; Northern Ukraine campaign; Battle of Kyiv; Battle of Moshchun; Battle of Brovary; Eastern Ukraine campaign; Battle of Sievierodonetsk; Battle of Bakhmut; 2024 Kharkiv offensive; Battle of Chasiv Yar; Southern Ukraine campaign; Dnieper campaign; Zaporizhzhia Oblast offensives
- Website: revanche.com.ua

Commanders
- Current commander: "Dolia" (call sign)

Insignia
- Flag

The Revanche Tactical Group (Ukrainian: Тактична група «Реванш») is an active-operations unit of the Main Directorate of Intelligence of the Ministry of Defence of Ukraine (HUR MOU). In August 2025 it was incorporated into the International Legion of the Main Directorate of Intelligence.

== History ==
In 2014, following a prolonged political crisis that ended in the overthrow of the Yanukovych regime, pro-Russian separatist unrest spread across the east of the country, and the first Russian sabotage groups entered Donbas with the aim of fomenting an armed confrontation. Inspired by the idea of a unitary Ukraine, a group of patriots formed the militant community known as Revanche.

Members of the organisation took an active part in suppressing the separatist movements, opposed anti-Ukrainian elements, and fought in the ATO/JFO zone on the Mariupol, Donetsk and Luhansk axes between 2014 and the beginning of the full-scale invasion. On 28 February 2022 the Revanche battalion was formed from motivated volunteers and joined the defence of the capital from the first hours of the armed aggression.

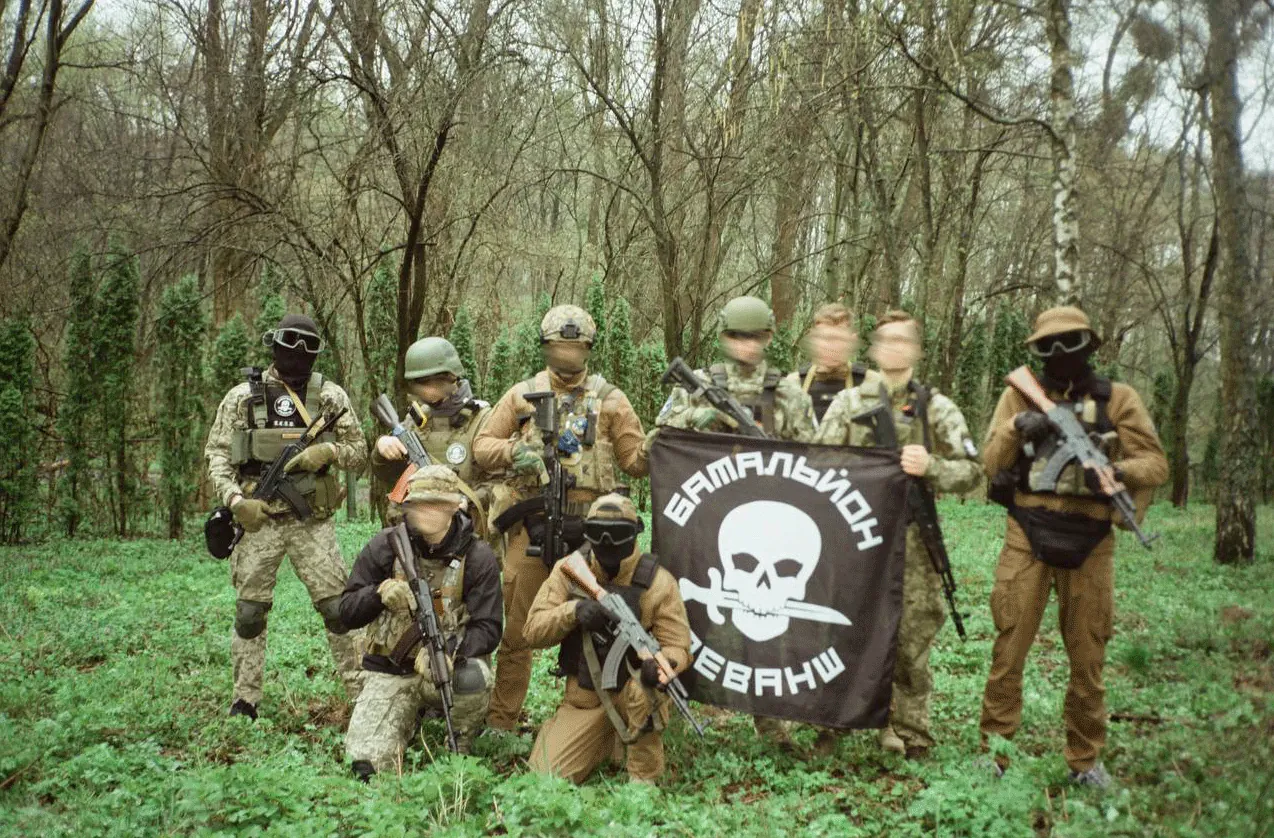
Fighters of the Revanche battalion with the unit flag. Kyiv Oblast, March 2022

In the spring of 2022 the unit's fighters took part in the defence of Kyiv Oblast: they fought for the village of Moshchun and helped liberate the villages of Lukianivka and Rudnytske. Among the unit's soldiers on the Kyiv axis was the singer Oleh Mykhailiuta, known as "Fagot", vocalist of the band TNMK.

The unit later operated in the east and south of Ukraine. In July 2024 its fighters were engaged at Chasiv Yar, and from 2025 they carried out missions on the Zaporizhzhia axis near Stepnohirsk.

In August 2025 Revanche was incorporated into the International Legion of the Main Directorate of Intelligence, which includes both Ukrainian and foreign volunteers.

In 2026, a commander of the Advanced Company of Revanche was accused of beatings, torture, and the death of a Brazilian volunteer in December 2025. Police and military ombudsman investigations were begun.

== Insignia ==
The unit's emblem is a white skull pierced by a dagger on a black shield.

== Battles ==
=== 2022 ===
Defence of Kyiv Oblast. During the first months of the full-scale invasion the unit took part in the defence of Kyiv Oblast. Its fighters were engaged at Hostomel, Irpin and Bucha, fought for the village of Moshchun, and on the Brovary axis, together with neighbouring and partisan units, liberated the villages of Lukianivka and Rudnytske. The successes on the outskirts of the capital made it possible to shorten the front line and redeploy units to other sectors. Among those who fought on the Kyiv axis with the unit was the singer Oleh Mykhailiuta ("Fagot"), vocalist of the band TNMK.

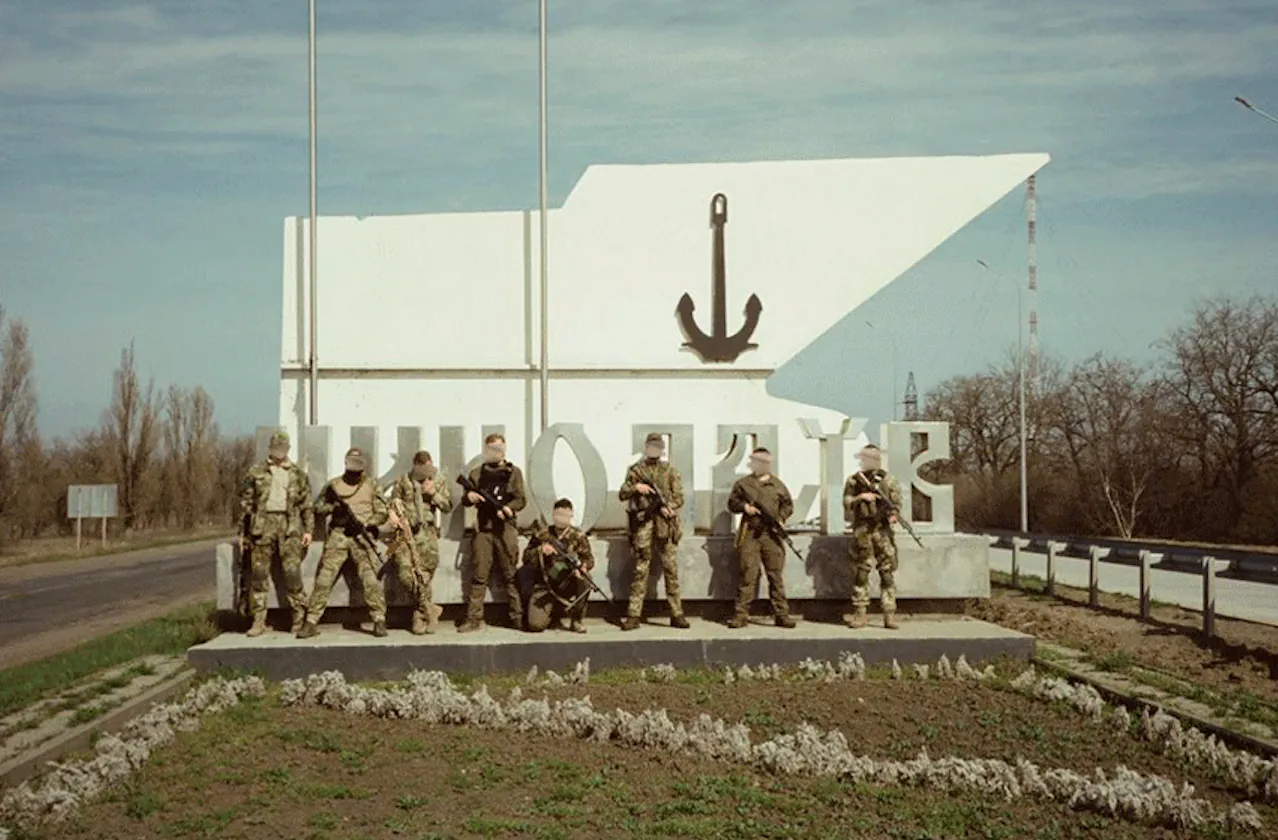
Fighters of Revanche at the Mykolaiv city sign, April 2022

Southern sector. After Kyiv Oblast was liberated, in April 2022 the unit operated in Kherson and Mykolaiv oblasts. The villages of Nova Zoria and Tavriiske became a battlefield; Russian forces abandoned further offensive operations towards Mykolaiv Oblast because of the resistance they met in this sector.

Battle for Sievierodonetsk. In June 2022 the unit's soldiers took part in the fighting for Sievierodonetsk, a centre of the chemical industry that Russian forces sought to capture. The defensive actions were successful, and the positions held were subsequently handed over to neighbouring units.

=== 2023 ===
Bakhmut. In the spring of 2023 the unit was engaged in the city of Bakhmut, Donetsk Oblast, where Russian forces mounted daily frontal attacks on Ukrainian positions. Its task was to keep the enemy away from designated lines and to counter-attack positions captured from neighbouring units; according to the unit, Russian forces were held off in its area of responsibility and driven out of the positions of neighbouring formations.

Landing on the left bank of the Dnieper. In the summer of 2023 the unit took part in a landing operation on the Russian-held left bank of the Dnieper in Kherson Oblast. The fighters crossed the river by boat and established a bridgehead near the villages of Pidstepne and Kozachi Laheri to allow Ukrainian forces to consolidate there.

=== 2024 ===
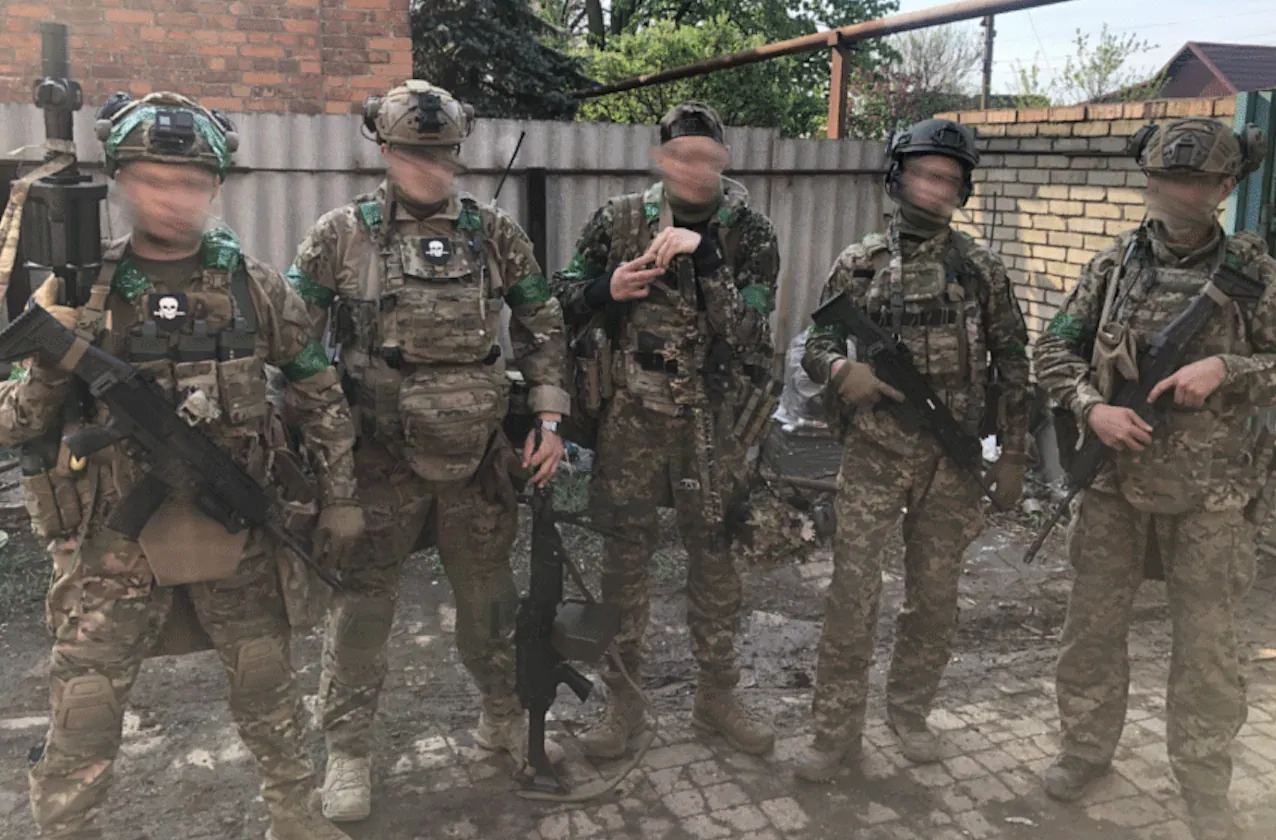
An assault group before moving out to positions. Chasiv Yar, April 2024

Defence of Chasiv Yar. In the spring and summer of 2024 the unit took part in the defence of Chasiv Yar, a strategic objective for Russian forces. Its tasks were to keep the enemy out of the built-up area and to engage infantry and vehicles on the approaches to the town. The fighting was marked by the massed use of FPV drones, daily air strikes, tank fire and salvoes of thermobaric rockets from TOS-1 heavy flamethrower systems. In July 2024 the unit's commander confirmed that Russian forces had entered the Kanal district, although Ukrainian troops prevented them from crossing the Siverskyi Donets–Donbas Canal.

Counter-offensive in Kharkiv Oblast. From the summer of 2024 the unit conducted offensive operations in the woodland on the outskirts of the village of Lyptsi in Kharkiv Oblast. Assault groups advanced under cover of fire support; according to the unit, about 400 hectares of forest belt were cleared and new positions consolidated. In August 2024 the unit's scouts destroyed a group of Russian motorised infantry in close-quarters combat.

Zaporizhzhia sector. From November 2024 the unit operated on the Zaporizhzhia axis, where the village of Kamianske became its first strongpoint. Ukrainian forces, together with the unit, assaulted the positions of Russian troops who were massing infantry and vehicles for a large-scale offensive; according to the unit, the front line in this sector shifted in Ukraine's favour for the first time since 2022, and the planned Russian offensive was called off.

Rivnopil. At the end of November 2024 the unit provided fire cover for infantry groups of neighbouring formations near the village of Rivnopil in Donetsk Oblast, at the junction of three oblasts. Grenade-launcher crews covered the advance of Ukrainian infantry and inflicted losses on Russian forces.

=== 2025 ===
Mali Shcherbaky. In the spring of 2025 the unit was tasked with clearing the outskirts of the village of Mali Shcherbaky and cutting Russian supply routes. In April 2025 strike-drone operators repelled an attempted massed mechanised assault, destroying about 40 armoured vehicles, three tanks and around ten buggies on the approaches. The task was carried out by three assault groups, and in October 2025 the village was fully liberated.

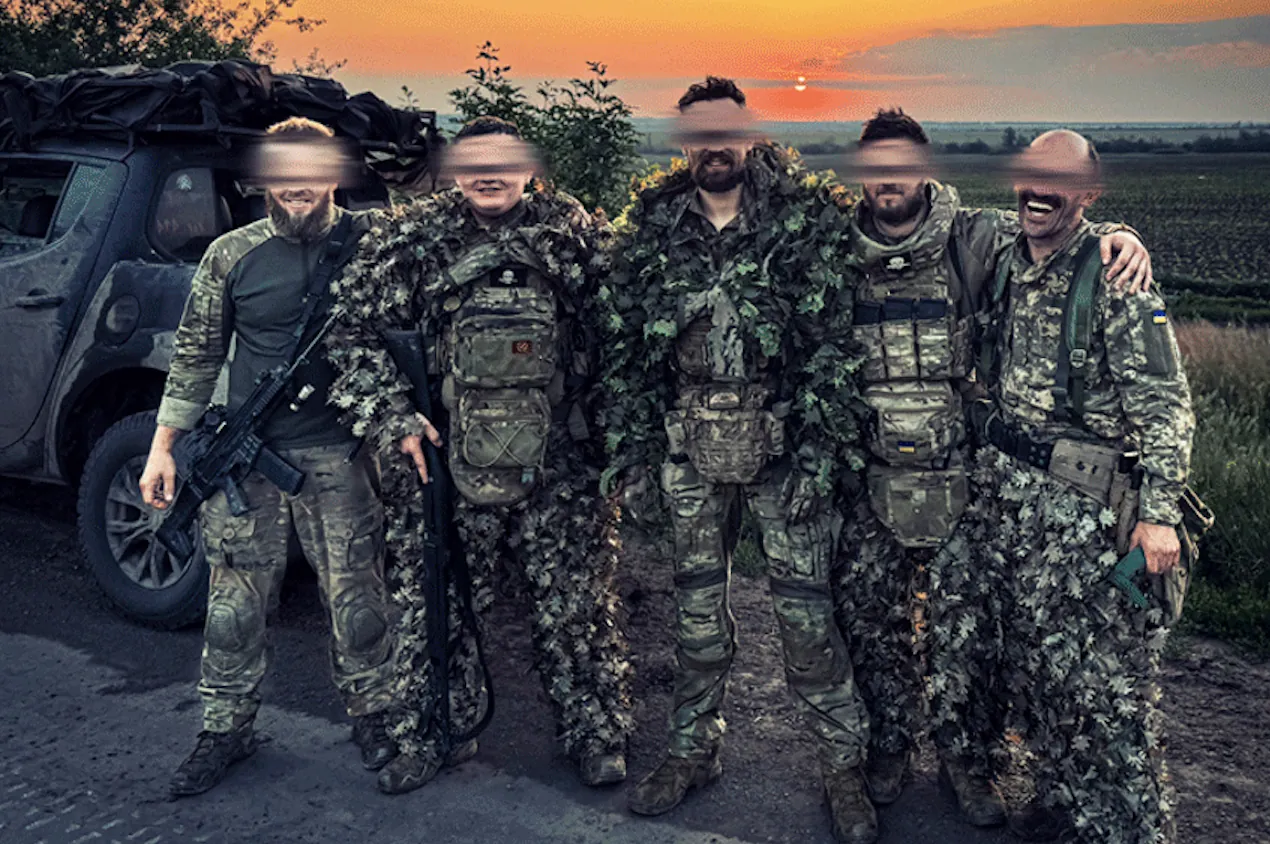
An assault group and grenadiers after returning from positions. Zelene Pole, June 2025

Zelene Pole. In early summer 2025 the unit carried out stabilisation operations in the village of Zelene Pole, Donetsk Oblast, where Russian forces were massing for a push towards Zaporizhzhia Oblast. The operation resulted in the restoration of Ukrainian positions.

Stepnohirsk and the "Romb" district. From July 2025 the unit took part in the defence of Stepnohirsk and its "Romb" district. Its fighters mounted raids into the Russian rear near Kamianske and on the outskirts of Stepnohirsk; individual groups operated behind enemy lines for more than 30 days. In November 2025 the unit's volunteers carried out a reconnaissance in force and repelled a Russian landing party. The defence of the district lasted several months and prevented Russian forces from massing for an advance on Zaporizhzhia.

=== 2026 ===
Stepnohirsk. As of the beginning of 2026 the defensive operation on the Zaporizhzhia axis was continuing. The Main Directorate of Intelligence released footage of the tactical group's operations in Stepnohirsk, and the unit's FPV drones struck Russian logistics at ranges of up to 40 km behind the front line. During the counter-offensive on the southern axis, Ukrainian forces liberated about 300 km² of territory.

Fighters of the tactical group during the clearance operation. Stepnohirsk, August 2026

Stepnohirsk clearance operation. In August 2026, after unsuccessful assaults on the Stepnohirsk axis, Russian forces switched to infiltration tactics, with small groups slipping between the positions of the Ukrainian Defence Forces in an attempt to observe Ukrainian troops or set up ambushes. Two special-purpose companies of the Revanche Tactical Group of the International Legion of the HUR, with the participation of French volunteers, carried out a combined reconnaissance and clearance operation against positions held by paratroopers of the Russian 247th Guards Air Assault Regiment. The enemy was located, the positions were cleared and the group of Russian servicemen was eliminated, preventing further infiltration by Russian groups in the Stepnohirsk area.

== Notable personnel ==
- Oleh Mykhailiuta ("Fagot") — Ukrainian singer, vocalist of the hip hop band TNMK.

== Recruitment ==
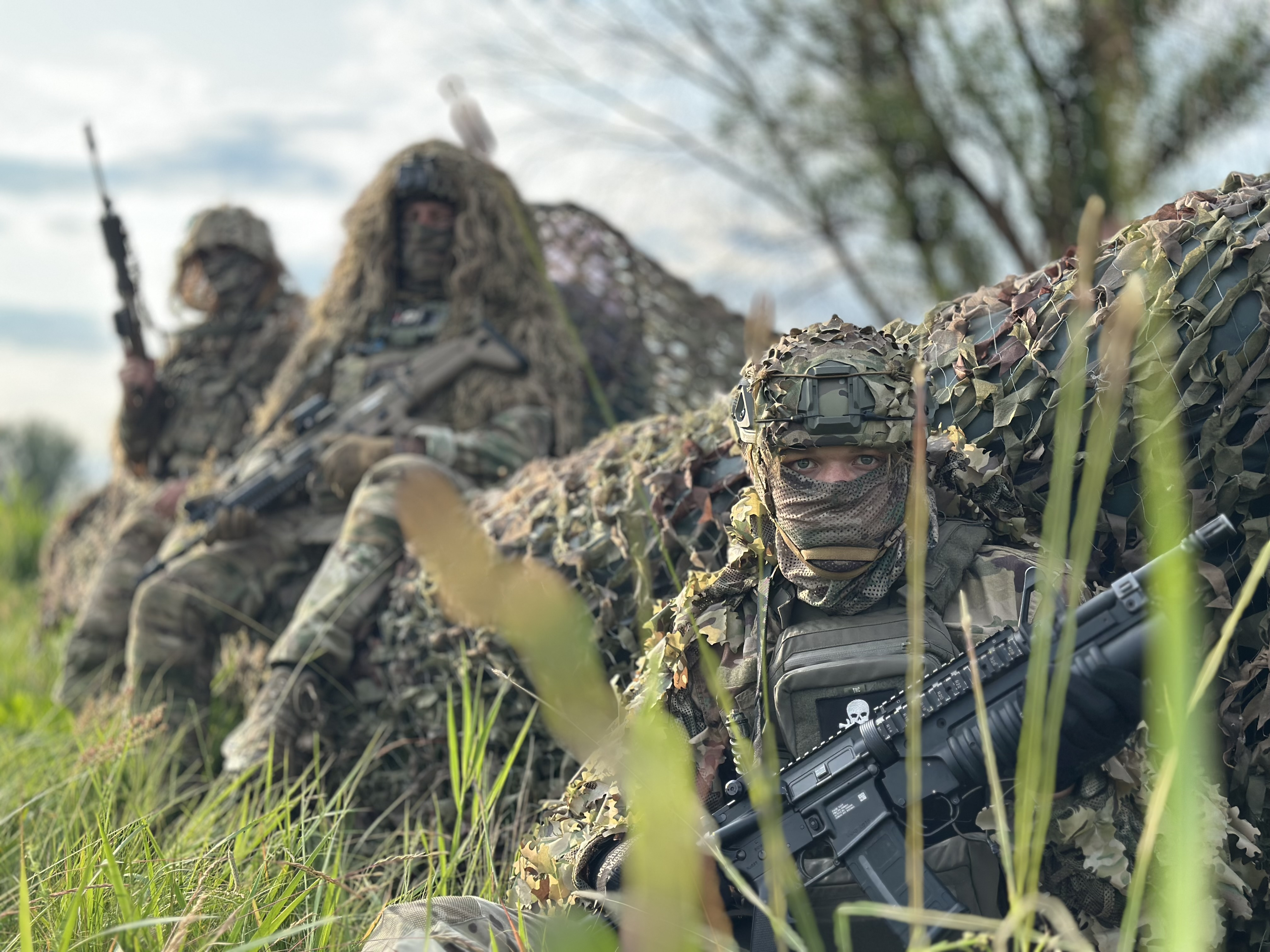
Fighters of the Revanche Tactical Group

The unit actively recruits and trains volunteers, including foreign nationals.
