= List of battles with most Ukrainian military fatalities =

This article contains a list of battles and military campaigns with most Ukrainian military deaths.

== Introduction ==
This article lists battles and campaigns in which the number of Ukrainian military fatalities exceed 1,000. The term casualty in warfare refers to a soldier who is no longer fit to fight after being in combat. Casualties can include killed, wounded, missing, captured or deserted.

== Battles ==
Battle or siege	Conflict	Date	Estimated number killed	Opposing force	References
Battle of Bakhmut	Russian Invasion of Ukraine	July 15, 2022 to May 20, 2023	Over 15,143 killed (Note: Confirmed by name. Excludes foreign volunteers and partisans)	Russia; Donetsk People's Republic	
Sack of Baturyn	Great Northern War	October 27 to November 2, 1708	7,000 killed (Note: Estimates range from 6,000 to 7,000 soldiers killed. This figure does not include the number of civilians who were also killed)	(Tsardom of Russia) Russia	
Battle of Gurby	Anti-Soviet resistance by the Ukrainian Insurgent Army	April 21 to 25, 1944	2,018 killed (Note: Estimates range from 80 to 2,018)	Soviet Union	
Siege of Mariupol	Russian Invasion of Ukraine	February 24 to May 20, 2022	Over 1,247 killed (Note: Confirmed by name. Excludes foreign volunteers and partisans)	Russia; Donetsk People's Republic	
Battle of Krynky	Russian Invasion of Ukraine	October 20, 2023 to July 17, 2024	Over 1,000 killed	Russia	

== Campaigns ==
Campaign	Conflict	Date	Estimated number killed	Opposing force	References
2023 Ukrainian counteroffensive	Russian Invasion of Ukraine	June 6 to December 31, 2023	Over 14,446 killed (Note: Confirmed by name. Excludes foreign volunteers and partisans)	Russia	
Khotyn Uprising	Ukrainian War of Independence	January 7 to February 1, 1919	11,000 killed	Romania	
Kursk campaign	Russian Invasion of Ukraine	August 6, 2024 to March 2025	Over 6,601 killed (Note: Confirmed by name. Excludes foreign volunteers and partisans)	Russia; North Korea (November 2024-March 2025)	
2022 Russian invasion of Ukraine	Russian Invasion of Ukraine	February 24 to April 8, 2022	Over 4,734 killed (Note: Confirmed by name. Excludes foreign volunteers and partisans)	Russia; Donetsk People's Republic; Luhansk People's Republic	
Dnieper campaign	Russian Invasion of Ukraine	September 1, 2022 to Present	Over 1,000 killed (Note: Over 1,000 killed in Krynky alone)	Russia	
