= Pishchanivka =

Village in Kherson Raion, Ukraine

Pishchanivka Піщанівка
- Village
- Interactive map of Pishchanivka
- Location of Pishchanivka within Ukraine Pishchanivka (Ukraine)
- Coordinates: 46.649167°N 32.841667°E
- Country: Ukraine
- Oblast: Kherson Oblast
- Raion: Kherson Raion
- Hromada: Oleshky urban hromada
- Status: 1955

Area
  - Total: 25.046 km^{2} (9.670 sq mi)
- Elevation: 9 m (30 ft)

Population (2001 census)
  - Total: 582
  - Density: 23.2/km^{2} (60.2/sq mi)
- Time zone: UTC+2 (EET)
  - Summer (DST): UTC+3 (EEST)
- Postal code: 75112
- Area code: +380 5542

Pishchanivka (Ukrainian: Піщанівка) is a village in Kherson Raion, Kherson Oblast in southern Ukraine. It belongs to Oleshky urban hromada, one of the hromadas of Ukraine. Before 1955, it was part of the village Pidstepne.

== Geography ==
It is located about 2 kilometres (1.2 mi) southeast of the riverbank of the Dnipro.

== History ==
The village was founded in the second quarter of the 19th century by immigrants from Penza, Kaluga, and some from Right-bank Ukraine and Moldova. Many farms were located in the area, and in 1940, the farms were merged into a village going by the name Pidstepne. The village was renamed in 1955 to its current name, Pishchanivka. During the Russian Civil War, the Soviets took over the village in January 1918, and in 1933, a collective farm was organized in the village called Gorky. Gorky housed the 2nd department of the state farm of Tsiurupynsk (now known as Oleshky). During the Great Patriotic War, the village was occupied by German troops from 11 September 1941 to 3 November 1943, before being retaken by Soviet troops.

Pishchanivka was captured by Russian forces during the Russian invasion of Ukraine that began in 2022. Early on 18 October 2023, it was reported that Ukrainian forces had reached the village during an incursion during the Dnipro campaign. Due to the Russian destruction of the Kakhovka Dam, the village is almost entirely flooded, with residents reportedly being on the way for evacuation in 2023.

== Demographics ==
In 2001 the settlement had 582 inhabitants, native language as of the Ukrainian Census of 2001:

- Ukrainian – 95.02%
- Russian – 4.30%
- Belarusian – 0.34%
- Romanian (as "Moldovan") – 0.17%

== Monuments ==
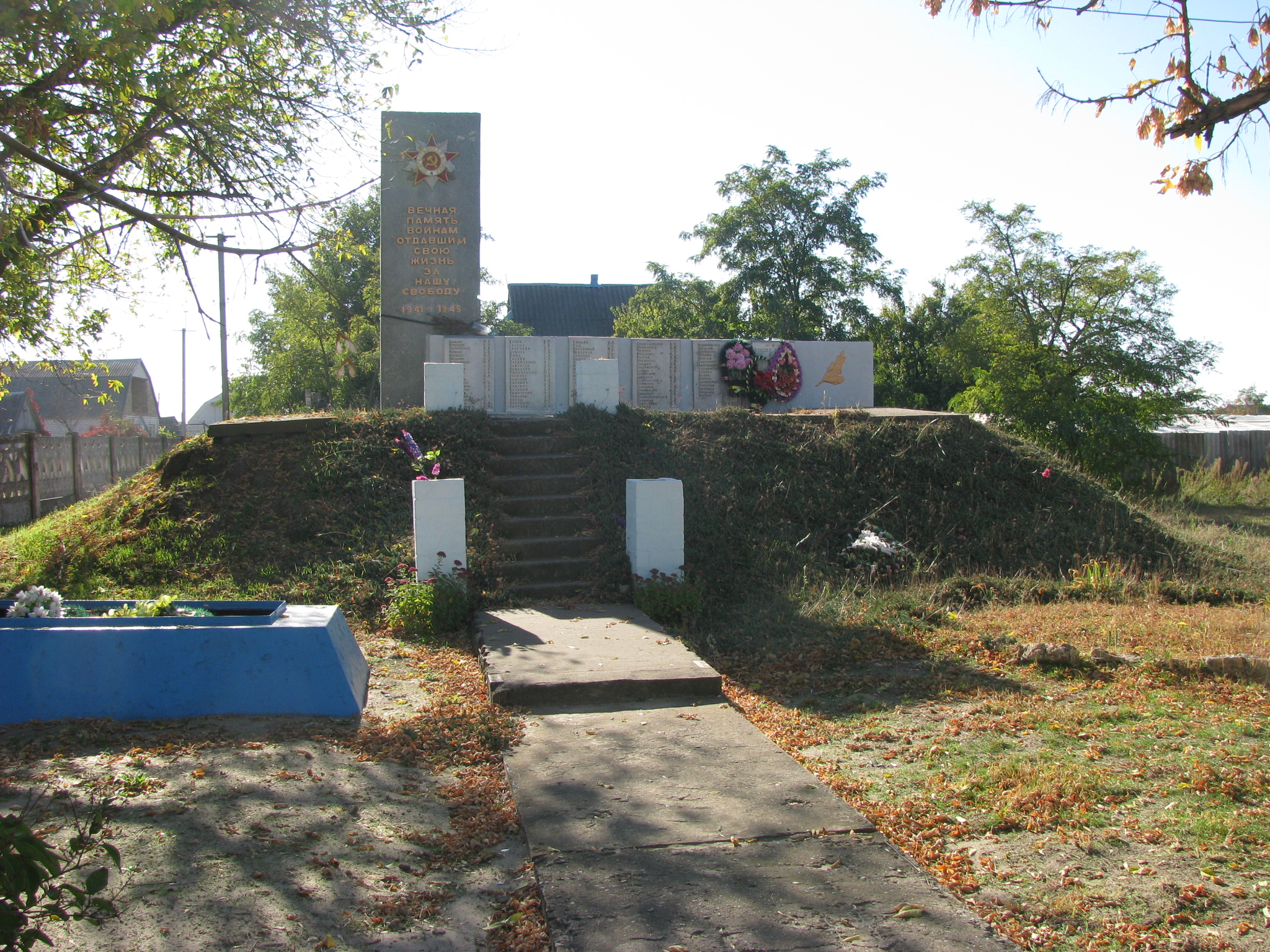
The monuments for the soldiers and villagers in Pishchanivka.

Inside the village is a mass grave of Soviet soldiers and a monument to the villagers who fought.
