= Krynky =

Krynky Кринки
- Village
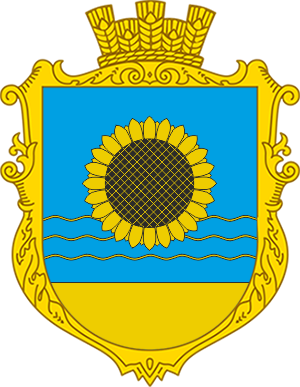
- Coat of arms
- Interactive map of Krynky
- Location of Krynky within Ukraine Krynky (Ukraine)
- Coordinates: 46.7375°N 33.0925°E
- Country: Ukraine
- Oblast: Kherson Oblast
- Raion: Kherson Raion
- Hromada: Oleshky urban hromada
- Founded: 1785

Area
  - Total: 15.73 km^{2} (6.07 sq mi)
- Elevation: 11 m (36 ft)

Population (2024)
  - Total: 0
  - Density: 0.0/km^{2} (0.0/sq mi)
- Time zone: UTC+2 (EET)
  - Summer (DST): UTC+3 (EEST)
- Postal code: 75110
- Area code: +380 5542

Krynky (Ukrainian: Кринки) is a village in Oleshky urban hromada, Kherson Raion, Kherson Oblast, Ukraine. It is located on the east bank of the Dnieper River.

== History ==
=== Russo-Ukrainian War ===
==== Russian invasion of Ukraine ====
During the Russian invasion of Ukraine, Krynky came under Russian control.

As a result of the destruction of the Kakhovka Dam in June 2023, Krynky was almost completely submerged, according to Tetiana Hasanenko, head of the Ukrainian military administration of the hromada. Most of its residents fled to neighboring Kozachi Laheri, which was also largely flooded. Ukrainian authorities lost contact with the population of the community, as electricity and internet were completely lost for days.

On 30 October 2023, during an incursion across the Dnieper, elements of the Ukrainian 37th and 38th separate Marine brigades had advanced to and recaptured Krynky. Although no heavy equipment had been brought across the river, the Marines were supported by MRLs and artillery from the right bank. Supplies to the Ukrainian troops were maintained by small boats. Despite the reinforcements from the Russian 382nd, 337th airborne regiment at the end of 2023, Ukrainian marines were still holding parts of land around the village as of May 2024, and intense fighting continued for months, making largely a grey zoned battlefield.

As of June 2024, the bridgehead probably ceased to exist and there was likely no longer any permanent Ukrainian presence in Krynky. By 18 July, Russia retook the village after Ukrainian withdrawal. Ukraine did not reveal the losses its forces suffered over the nine months in and around the bridgehead on Dnipro's east bank. Soldiers told the Kyiv Independent that "bodies lost to the river are nearly impossible to retrieve." However, a Ukrainian investigative outlet, citing the Ukrainian police, reported that 262 Ukrainian soldiers had been identified as killed and their bodies returned, while 788 remained missing in action, during the period from October 2023 to June 2024.

As of 25 October 2026, UALosses has confirmed the names of 353 Ukrainian soldiers killed, 703 missing and 58 captured during the battle.

== Demographics ==
As of the 2001 Ukrainian census, the settlement had 991 inhabitants. Their native languages were 90.21% Ukrainian and 9.28% Russian.
