= Dnieper campaign =

Dnieper campaign and related terms may refer to:

- Battle of the Dnieper (1943)
- Dnieper–Carpathian offensive (1943–1944)
- Dnieper campaign (2022–present)
