= Sahy, Ukraine =

Sahy Саги
- Village
- Location of Sahy Sahy (Ukraine)
- Coordinates: 46°36′44″N 32°47′40″E
- Country: Ukraine
- Oblast: Kherson Oblast
- Raions of Ukraine: Kherson Raion
- Hromada: Oleshky urban hromada

Area
  - Total: 4 km^{2} (1.5 sq mi)
  - Land: 3.8 km^{2} (1.5 sq mi)
  - Water: 0.2 km^{2} (0.077 sq mi) 5%
- Elevation: 5 m (16 ft)

Population
  - Estimate (January 2022): 770
- Time zone: UTC+2 (Eastern European Time)
  - Summer (DST): UTC+3 (Eastern European Summer Time)

Sahy (Ukrainian: Саги) is a small village in the Kherson Raion of the Kherson Oblast in Ukraine with a pre-war population of 770.

It has an area of 4 square kilometres (1.5 mi^{2}). Sahy is located around 8.5 miles (13.6 km) south-east of the city of Kherson.

The village's time-zone is UTC+2 (UTC+3 in the summer), which is standard across Ukraine except for the separatist Donetsk and Luhansk People's Republics, which observe Moscow Standard time (UTC+3).

== History ==
The village was founded sometime in the second half of the nineteenth century by people from Penza and Kaluga, along with some from the Right-bank Ukraine and modern Moldova. The Soviet Union took over the village in January 1918. Later, during the Great Patriotic War, the village was occupied by German troops from 11 September 1941 to 4 November 1943.

The village is currently occupied by Russian forces, due to the 2022 Russian invasion of Ukraine. Due to the Destruction of the Kakhovka Dam on June 6, 2023, the village was temporarily flooded.

== Demographics ==
According to the 2001 Ukrainian Census, the only official census taken in post-independence Ukraine, the population of the village was 804 people. Of the people residing in the village, their mother tongue is as follows:

Language	Percentage of Population
Ukrainian	91.92%
Russian	6.72%
Armenian	1.00%
Polish	0.24%
Romanian	0.06%
Other	0.06%

== Monuments ==
There is a monument to the Hero of the Soviet Union, Ivan Ivanovich Boyko, located in the village. He was awarded the title for his fighting against the Nazis during World War II, and was born in the village.
