= Pody, Kherson Oblast =

Village in Kherson Oblast, Ukraine

Pody Поди
- Village
- Location within Kherson Oblast Location within Ukraine
- Coordinates: 46°27′54.4″N 32°49′3.1″E
- Country: Ukraine
- Oblast: Kherson Oblast
- Raion: Kherson Raion
- Hromada: Oleshky urban hromada

Area
  - Total: 3 km^{2} (1.2 sq mi)
- Elevation: 15 m (49 ft)

Population
  - Estimate (Jan 2022): 141
- Time zone: UTC+2 (Eastern European Time)
  - Summer (DST): UTC+3 (Eastern European Summer Time)
- Postal Code: 75130

Pody (Ukrainian: Поди) is a small village in Kherson Raion of Kherson Oblast of Ukraine. It belongs to Oleshky urban hromada, one of the hromadas of Ukraine. The village had a pre-war population of 141 residents.

== Geography ==
Pody is situated 15 metres (49 ft) above sea level. It is located 15 miles (24 km) to the south-east of Kherson city and 10 miles (16 km) south-west of the Oleshky Sands National Park.

== History ==
Until 18 July 2020, Pody belonged to Oleshky Raion. The raion was abolished in July 2020 as part of the administrative reform of Ukraine, which reduced the number of raions of Kherson Oblast to five. The area of Oleshky Raion was merged into Kherson Raion.

During the 2022 Russian invasion of Ukraine, the village was occupied by Russia.
