= Kostohryzove, Kakhovka Raion, Kherson Oblast =

Kostohryzove Костогри́зове
- Village
- Interactive map of Kostohryzove
- Location of Kostohryzove within Ukraine Kostohryzove (Ukraine)
- Coordinates: 46°33′44″N 33°35′06″E
- Country: Ukraine
- Oblast: Kherson Oblast
- Raion: Kakhovka Raion

Area
  - Total: 0.01 km^{2} (0.0039 sq mi)
- Elevation: 39 m (128 ft)

Population (2001 census)
  - Total: 924
  - Density: 92,000/km^{2} (240,000/sq mi)
- Time zone: UTC+2 (EET)
  - Summer (DST): UTC+3 (EEST)
- Postal code: 74844
- Area code: +380 5536

Kostohryzove (Ukrainian: Костогри́зове) is a village in southern Ukraine, located in Kakhovka Raion, Kherson Oblast. It has a population of 924.

== History ==
The village was founded in 1900 by migrants from the village of the nearby village of Kostohryzove, which is located in the Kherson Raion. At the time, the village was part of the lands of Nataliya Stroganova, which is where it got its original official name of Stroganivka from. During the Stolypin reform of agriculture, the former land of Stroganova was purchased by the peasants, who declined to keep the original name. The settlers renamed it to Novo-Kostohryzivka, and the settlement was officially mentioned starting in 1911. From 11 September 1941 to 2 November 1943 the village was occupied by German forces during the Great Patriotic War.

On 12 June 2020, Kostohryzove was assigned to Zelenyi Pid rural hromada. Kostohryzove was occupied by Russian forces during the Russian invasion of Ukraine that began in 2022. On 17 July 2020, as a result of administrative-territorial form and liquidation, the village was incorporated into the Kakhovka Raion.

== Demographics ==
According to the 2001 Ukrainian census, the only official census taken in post-independence Ukraine, the village's population was 924. The linguistic composition of the settlement was as follows:

Native languages in Kostohryzove
	percent
Ukrainian	97.4%
Russian	2.1%
Romanian	0.3%
Belarusian	0.1%
others	0.1%

== Monuments ==
On 21 November 2016, on the Day of Dignity and Freedom, a ceremony was held at Kostohryzove Secondary School where a memorial plaque was dedicated to honor Vitaliy Pavlovych Blahovisnyi, who graduated from the school. Blahovisnyi served as a combat engineer and was killed on 14 November 2015 during a mortar attack near Butivka mine in Donetsk Oblast.
