= Podi =

Podi may refer to:

- PODi, a digital printing industry organization
- Podi, Bar, a village in Montenegro
- Podi, Kolašin, a village in Montenegro
- Podi, Herceg Novi, a village in Montenegro
- Podi, Croatia, a village near Trilj
- Podi Patharakari, a character in the Sri Lankan television series Salsapuna
- Podi Wije, Sri Lankan criminal

== See also ==
- Pody (disambiguation)
