= Solontsi, Kherson Oblast =

Solontsi Солонці
- Village
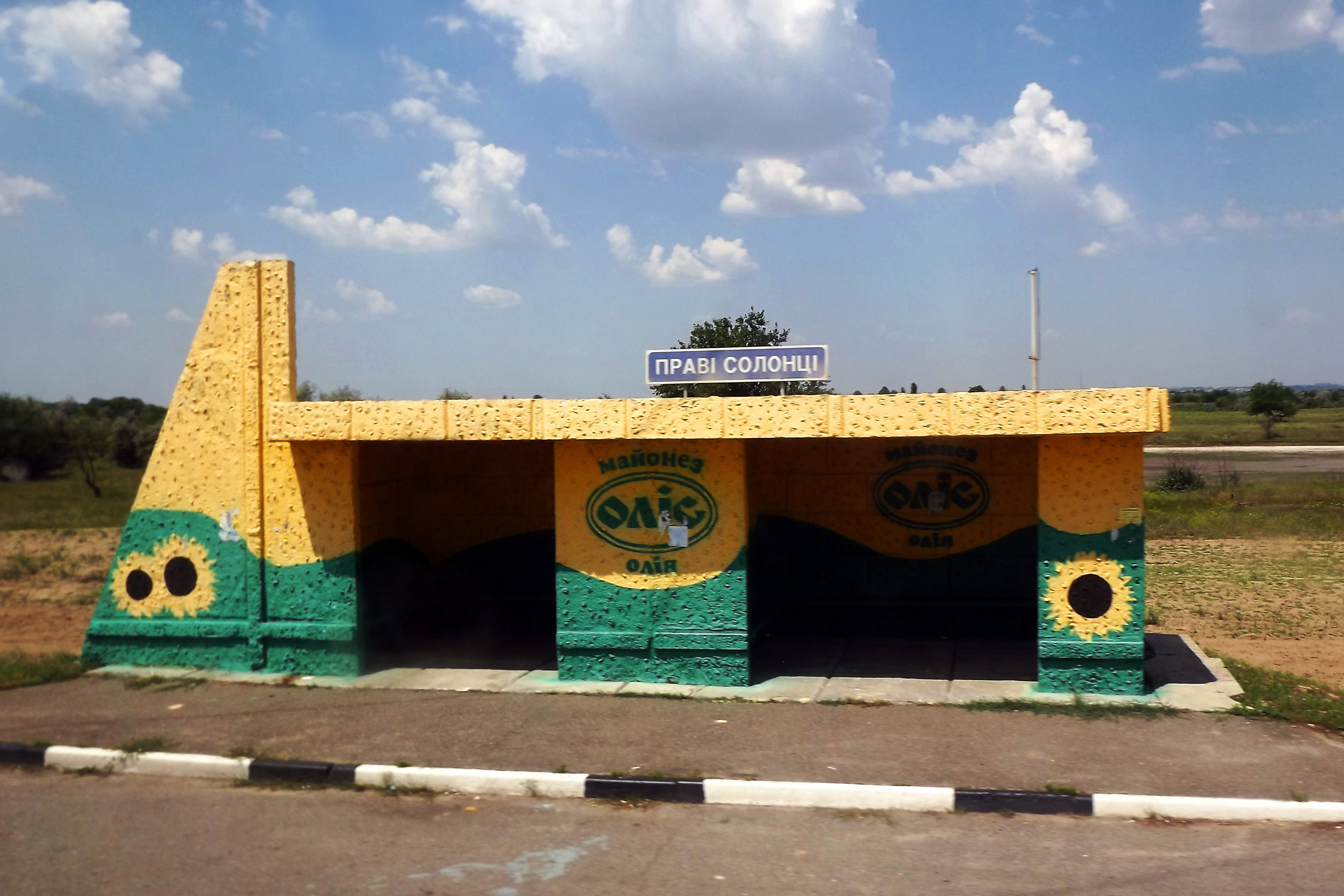

- Location of Solontsi Solontsi (Kherson Oblast)
- Coordinates: 46°34′29.4″N 32°40′12.9″E
- Country: Ukraine
- Oblast: Kherson Oblast
- Raion: Kherson Raion
- Hromada: Oleshky urban hromada
- Established: 1843

Area
  - Total: 4 km^{2} (1.5 sq mi)
  - Land: 3.9 km^{2} (1.5 sq mi)
  - Water: 0.1 km^{2} (0.039 sq mi) 2.5%
- Elevation: 2 m (6.6 ft)

Population
  - Estimate (2020): 1,050
- Time zone: UTC+2 (Eastern European Time)
  - Summer (DST): UTC+3 (Eastern European Summer Time)
- Postal Code: 75109
- Telephone Area Code: +380 5542

Solontsi (Ukrainian: Солонці) is a village in Kherson Raion, Kherson Oblast, southern Ukraine. The village is located eight kilometres (five miles) south-east of the city of Kherson and 1.5 miles (2.4 km) south of Oleshky. The village is located close to the Dnieper River and is two metres (6.6 feet) above sea level.

== History ==
The village was founded in the 1840s, and was named Solontsi due to the 10 small salt lakes that were previously extracted. It is known that there is a burial site from the Late Bronze Age near the village. In January 1918, the Soviet Union began its occupation of the city. During the Great Patriotic War, 127 residents of the village went into combat against the Germans, of whom 80 did not return. From September 1941 to November 1943 the village was occupied by German troops.

As of June 2023, the village is under Russian occupation as a result of the Russian invasion of Ukraine. Following the breach of the Kakhovka Dam due to Russian forces, the village was completely flooded.

There is a monument located in the village in honor of soldiers and a memorial plaque in honor of Ruslan Bilenko, who lived in the city and was later killed in November 2014 while serving in the Armed Forces of Ukraine.

== Population ==
The distribution of population by their native language based on the 2001 Ukrainian census:

Language	Percentage of Population
Ukrainian	92.20%
Russian	4.47%
Armenian	2.95%
Belarusian	0.19%

It had a pre-war population of 1,050 inhabitants. The Yezidis from Armenia began to move to the village following the 1988 Armenian earthquake in the Armenian SSR. During a study from the 2000s, 9% of the Solontsi Secondary School's student body was composed of Yezidis.
