= Radensk =

Radensk Раденськ
- Village
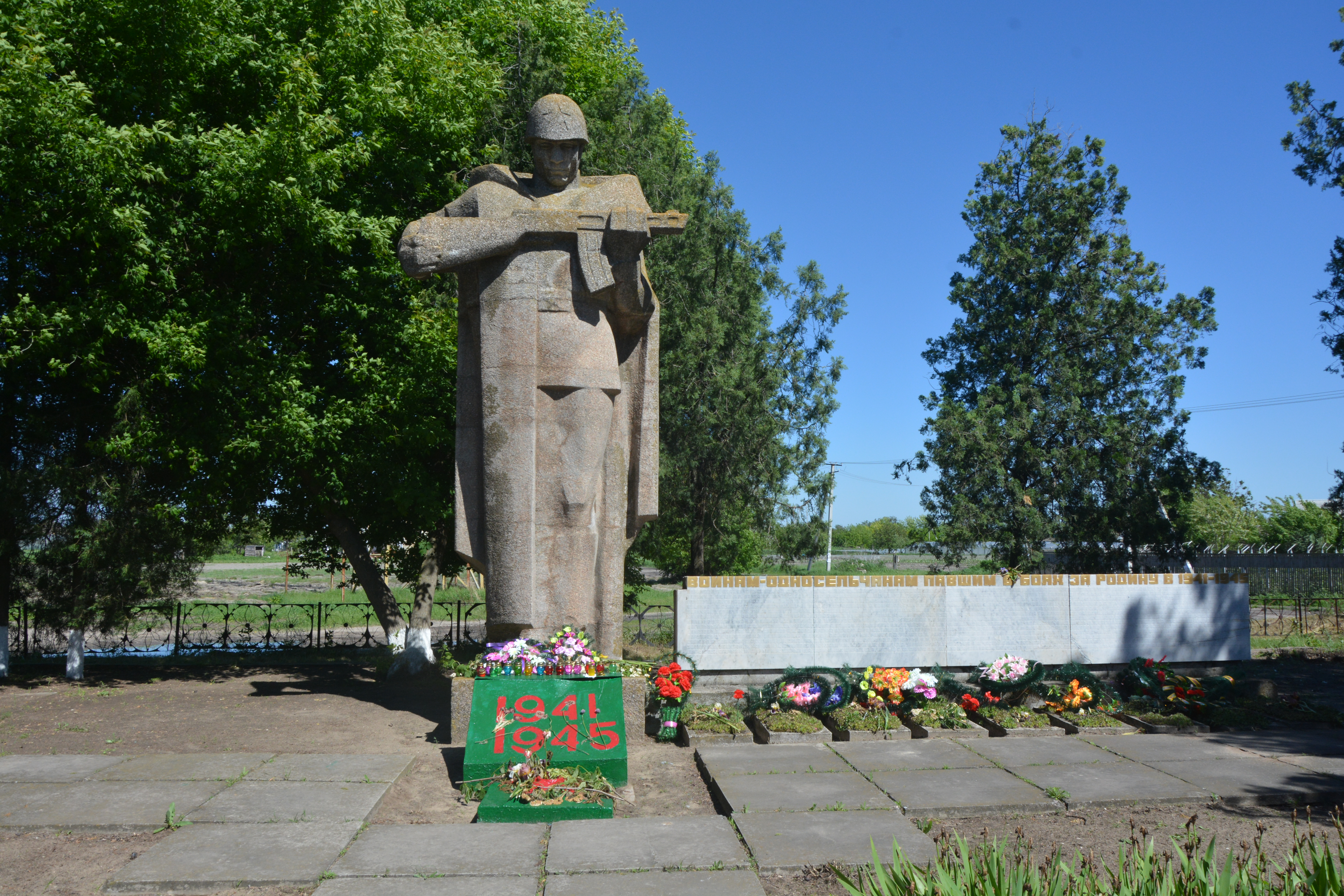
- World War II memorial in Radensk
- Interactive map of Radensk
- Location of Radensk Radensk (Ukraine)
- Coordinates: 46°33′00″N 32°55′45″E
- Country: Ukraine
- Oblast: Kherson Oblast
- Raion: Kherson Raion
- Hromada: Oleshky urban hromada

Population (2001)
  - Total: 3,972

Radensk (Ukrainian: Раденськ) is a village in Oleshky urban hromada, Kherson Raion, Kherson Oblast, Ukraine. The population was 3,972 at the 2001 Ukrainian census.

== History ==
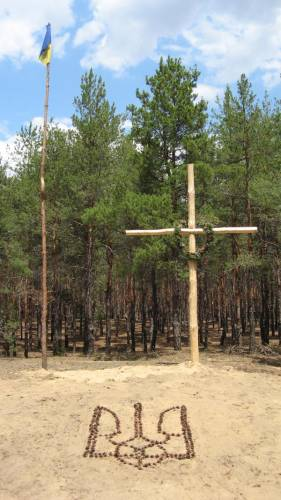
A memorial dedicated to the freedom fighters of Ukraine, 2007.

The village was founded in 1796. There are multiple versions of how the name came to be for the village: the Radenka river once flowed through it so it was named Radensk after it, the first settlers were Cossack and often gathered in the village for council, or in one of the older versions, the Tatar-Mongols passed through the land and set up camps called Redeni (which is Radensk in Tatar language).

At the time of its settlement in October 1796, there were 64 residents already there, who were mostly former Cossacks and fugitives from the right bank of Ukraine. The Soviets took over control of the village in January 1918, and in January 1930 the first collective farm was established in the village. During the Great Patriotic War the village was occupied from 11 September 1941 to 4 November 1943 by German troops, before Soviet troops regained the village. In 1959, the Radensk State Farm was founded.

Radensk was occupied by Russia during the Russian invasion of Ukraine. The hromada head Yevhen Ryshchuk, giving an interview in April 2022, relayed an incident during which, in the village, the Russians brought humanitarian aid in the form of clothes, but the angry civilians refused to accept them due to the then-recent Bucha massacre committed by Russia, and destroyed the clothing with a tractor. Reportedly, after the returning Russians were unable to find the specific person who drove the tractor, they went to the man who owned the tractor, and nailed him by his palms to a fence.

On 18 September 2023, Ukraine reportedly launched a HIMARS missile strike on a command post of the Russian 70th Motorized Rifle Division in Radensk, killing eight officers and injuring seven others.

== Demographics ==
In 2001, the population was 3,972. The makeup of native language of the population was:

Language	Number	Percentage
Ukrainian	3699	93.13%
Russian	266	6.70%
Romani	5	0.13%
Other	2	0.04%
Total	3972	100%
