= Oleshky urban hromada =

- Hromada
- Interactive map of Oleshky urban hromada
- Country: Ukraine
- Oblast: Kherson Oblast
- Raion: Kherson Raion
- Admin. center: Oleshky

Government
  - Head: Tetiana Hasanenko

Area
  - Total: 799.2 km^{2} (308.6 sq mi)

Population (2020)
  - Total: 38,313
  - Density: 47.94/km^{2} (124.2/sq mi)
- Settlements: 13
- Cities: 1
- Rural settlements: 2
- Villages: 10
- Website: https://oleshki-rada.gov.ua/

Oleshky urban hromada (Ukrainian: Олешківська міська територіальна громада) is a hromada (community) of Ukraine, in Kherson Raion, Kherson Oblast. Its administrative center is the city Oleshky.

== Extent and settlements ==
Its area is 799.2 square kilometres (308.6 mi^{2}) and its population is 38,313 people, as of 2020.

It includes the city of Oleshky, the villages Kozachi Laheri, Kostohryzove, Krynky, Pidstepne, Pishchanivka, Pody, Radensk, Sahy, Solontsi, Chelburda and the rural settlements Pidlisne and Poima.

== History ==
Oleshky urban hromada was created in 2020 in accordance with an edict by the Ukrainian government determining the territories of hromadas in the Kherson region, by uniting the Oleshky city municipality with various village councils in what was then Oleshky Raion.

=== Russian invasion of Ukraine ===
Starting in late February 2022, the hromada came under Russian occupation during the Russian invasion of Ukraine. According to then-hromada head Yevhen Ryshchuk, all of the hromada officials refused to collaborate with the occupation regime. Ryshchuk, in an interview, stated that the community was now living "under the hands of orcs", comparing the soldiers' violent attacks on civilians to those committed by other Russian troops during the then-recently discovered Bucha massacre. He recalled, as he passed by the Antonivka Road Bridge, seeing gunned-down civilian cars with dead people in them. He also relayed an incident during which, in the village Radensk, the Russians brought humanitarian aid in the form of clothes, but the angry civilians refused to accept them due to the war crimes committed by Russia, and destroyed the clothing with a tractor. Reportedly, after the returning Russians were unable to find the specific person who drove the tractor, they went to the man who owned the tractor, and nailed him by his palms to a fence.

The Russian soldiers reportedly did not enter Oleshky itself in the first days of the war. To keep order, local residents formed a patrol service, carrying wooden sticks around town. At first, some of these patrolmen attempted to use some of the body armor worn by the dead soldiers on the Antonivka Bridge, but this was abandoned after Russian soldiers severely beat one man for wearing it. They refused an offer by the occupying soldiers to assist in the keeping of order. Regardless, the Russian soldiers would punish residents with beatings and kidnappings for both real and imagined crimes. Oleksandr Zarivnyi, former minister of education in the hromada and veteran of the war in Donbas, went missing on 17 March 2022. Ryshchuk, in a video message the following day, said that the occupiers had told him Zarivnyi was alive, but there was no information as to when anyone would see him again.

According to Ryshchuk, by the end of April 2022, 40% of the original population had fled. This flight took place in two "waves" - one after the discovery of atrocities in Bucha and fear of similar events in the hromada, and the second after rumors spread about forced mobilization of Ukrainians in occupied territories. Ryshchuk links the second wave specifically to an announcement by then-Ukrainian government advisor Oleksii Arestovych on television, instructing people to "Run!"

On 2 January 2023, Ukrainian President Volodymyr Zelenskyy signed a decree establishing a military administration for the hromada. Tetiana Hasanenko was appointed as the head of the military administration. Hasanenko had previously served as a deputy mayor of Oleshky. On 1 June 2023, Yury Patlatyi, a collaborationist official in Kostohryzove, was killed in an explosion under unknown circumstances. Russian occupation officials, reporting on his death, blamed the Armed Forces of Ukraine.

As a result of the destruction of the Kakhovka dam by explosives on 6 June 2023, most of the settlements in the hromada were flooded, killing at least nine people. According to Hasanenko, the village of Krynky, near the coast, was almost completely submerged. Most of its residents fled to Kozachi Laheri, which was also largely flooded. Ukrainian authorities lost contact with the population of the community, as electricity and internet were completely lost for days.

On 23 September 2023, the hromada began discussions on renaming the rural settlement Poima to "Zaplava". This was as a result of a decision by the National Commission for State Language Standards on 22 June, determining that the name of the settlement was not in line with state language standards, as it was a transliteration from Russian. "Zaplava" (Ukrainian: Заплава) is the native Ukrainian equivalent of Poima. This was one of 43 settlements in Kherson Oblast recommended to be renamed in the decision.
