= Polina Raiko =

Ukrainian naïve painter (1928–2004)

- Поліна Райко
- Born: Pelaheia Andriivna Soldatova; 5 May 1928; Oleshky, Ukrainian SSR, Soviet Union
- Died: 15 January 2004 (aged 75); Oleshky, Kherson Oblast, Ukraine
- Style: Naïve art
- Children: 2

Pelaheia Andriivna Raiko (née Soldatova; Ukrainian: Пелагея Андріївна Райко; 5 May 1928 - 15 January 2004), also known as Polina Raiko, was a Ukrainian naïve painter who started painting her property at the age of 69. Her home was a national cultural monument of Ukraine, until June 2023, when it was reportedly destroyed by flooding after the destruction of the Kakhovka Dam during the Russian invasion of Ukraine.

== Biography ==
Raiko was born 5 May 1928 in Oleshky. She had three sisters. She was deported to Germany during the Second World War, but later returned to Ukraine before marrying Nikolay Alekseyevich Raiko in 1950 at the age of 22. They survived by growing their own fruits and vegetables and doing seasonal work on a kolkhoz. They had a daughter, Elena in 1951. Their son, Sergey was born in 1953. The family built a house on 74 Nyzhnia Street, Oleshky near the Chaika and Konka rivers in 1954.

Her husband and son abused alcohol. Her son was imprisoned for three years after he nearly destroyed the family home and sold stolen items including the electrical wiring. After his release, he stabbed his mother with a knife. In 1994, Elena died in a car accident. Raiko's husband died in 1995. In 1997, Sergey was sent to a refuge colony. He died in 2002 from cirrhosis.

In the autumn of 1998, she began painting her home as a method to process her family hardships. She used her ₴74 monthly pension to buy paint and brushes. She eventually painted the entire property. Her home became a local tourist attraction. She died on 15 January 2004.

Her grandson sold her house for US$5,000 to Andrius Nemickas, a Canadian living in Kyiv with his Ukrainian wife. Her house was protected by a federal cultural heritage law. It was considered a national cultural monument of Ukraine.

Inspired by Raiko's paintings during the 2022 Russian invasion of Ukraine, pro-Ukrainian activists in Russian-occupied Kherson used a dove as a symbol of cultural resistance.

Her house was destroyed in June 2023, by flooding following the destruction of the Kakhovka Dam.
