= Oleshky Sands National Nature Park =

National park in Ukraine

- Ukrainian: Національний природний парк «Олешківські піски»
- IUCN category II (national park)
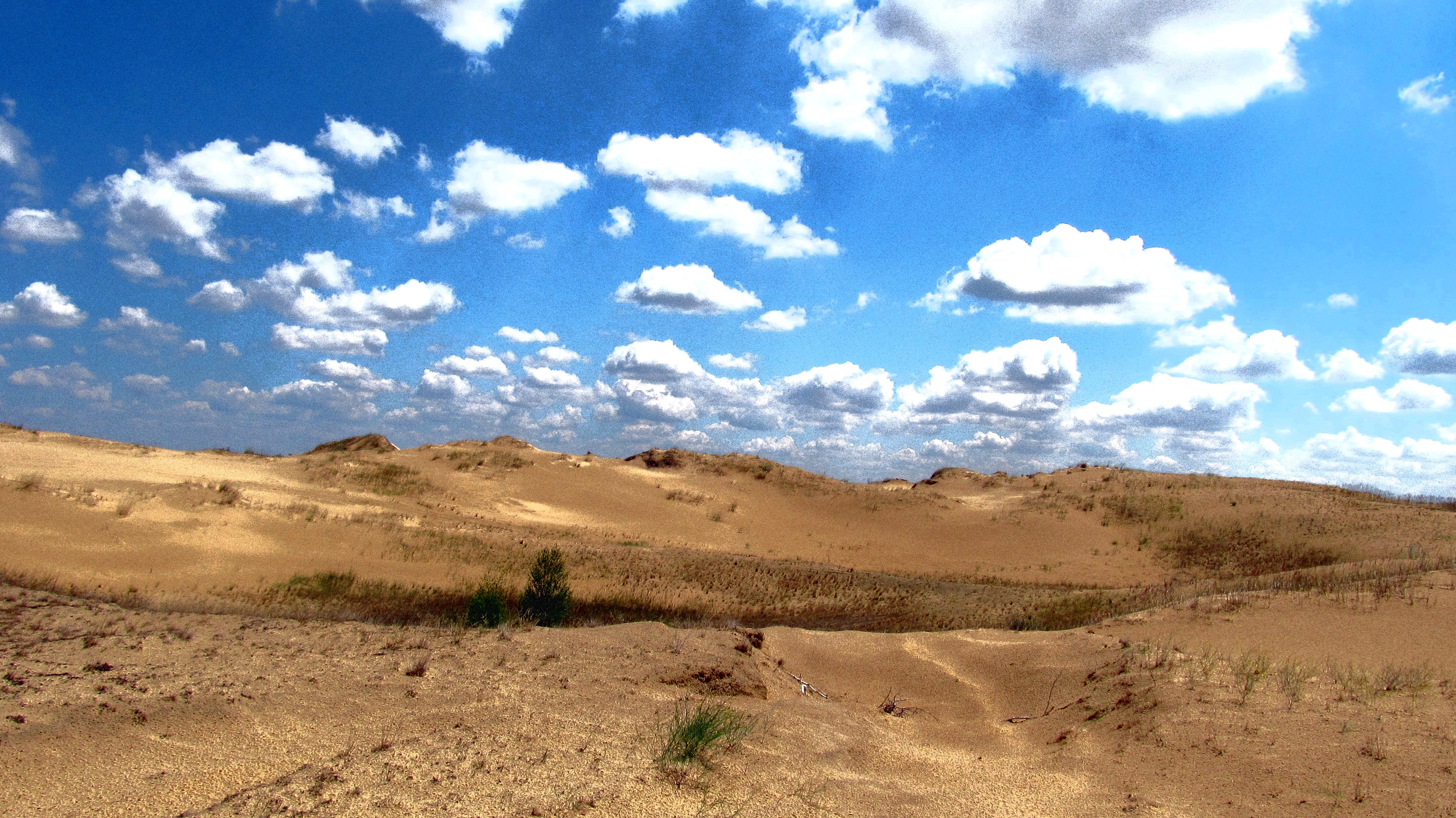
- Semi-arid landscape, Oleshky NNP

- Location within Ukraine
- Location: Kherson Oblast, Ukraine
- Nearest city: Oleshky
- Coordinates: 46°33′00″N 32°55′23″E
- Area: 8,020 hectares (80.2 km^{2}; 31.0 mi^{2})
- Designation: National Park
- Established: February 23, 2010
- Website: http://nppop.gov.ua/

The Oleshky Sands National Nature Park (Ukrainian: Національний природний парк «Олешківські піски», romanized: Oleškivs'ki pisky) is a national park of Ukraine, located south of the lower Dnieper River about 25 km east of the regional city of Kherson, and 70 km northwest of the Crimean Peninsula. The park features expanses of low-fertility soil and sand, and a variety of unusual microhabitats. The area is not a true desert, but rather semi-arid. As of 2019, visits by unaccompanied members of the public were strictly prohibited, with warnings that the area was next to a military training ground. The park is located in Kherson Oblast, in territory currently occupied by Russia.

== Topography ==
The park is located on the north slope of the Black Sea Basin. It is divided into two main zones:

- Radensk. The largest area, notable for the absence of pine forest stands, and for large sand dunes in the center. (6,780 ha)
- Burkut. An area of pine forest, meadows and lakes surrounded by sandy steppe. (1,240 ha)

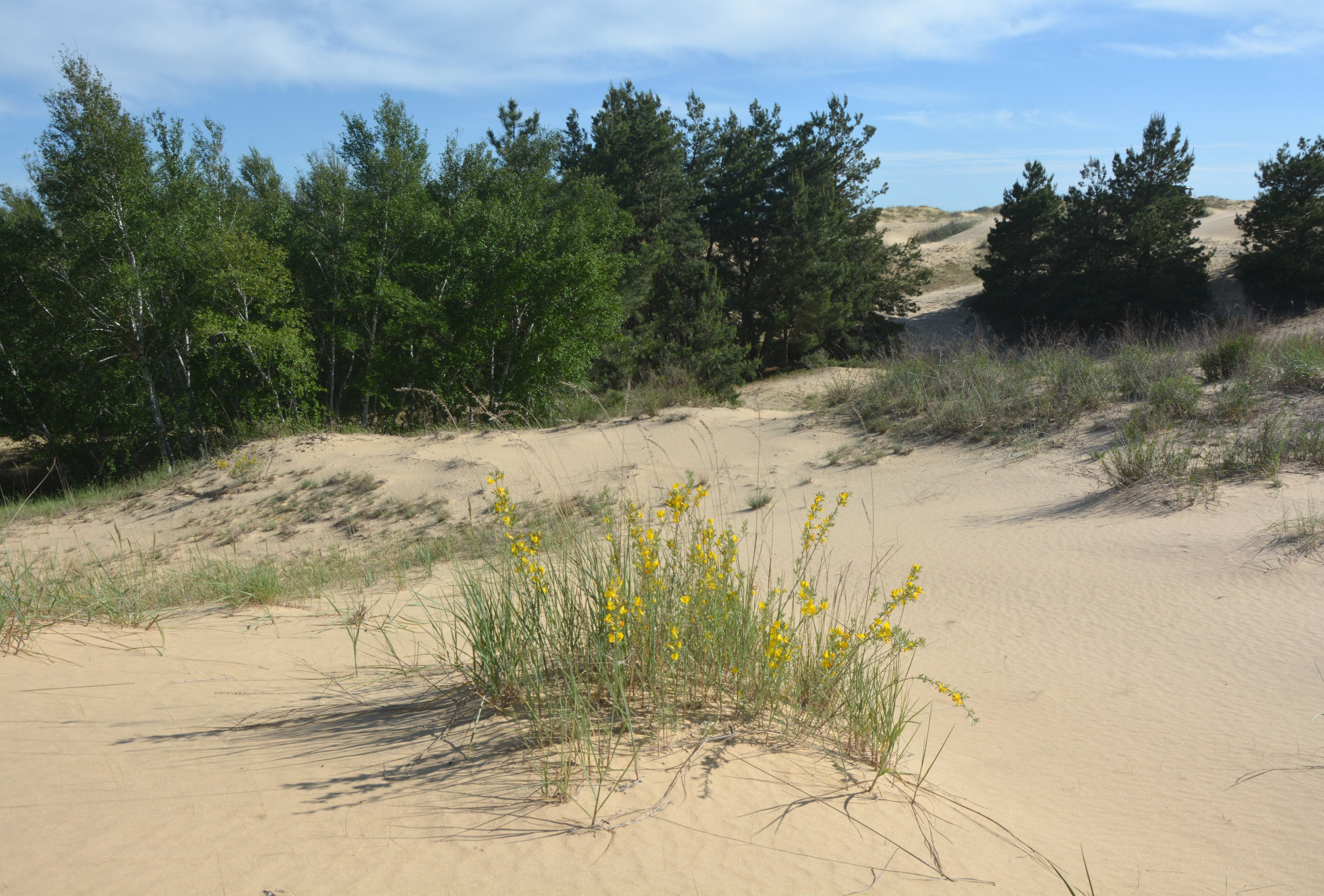
Stands of shrub and trees surrounded by sandy steppe

== Climate and ecoregion ==
The climate of Oleshky Sands is Humid continental climate - Hot summer sub-type (Köppen climate classification Dfa), with large seasonal temperature differentials and a hot summer (at least one month averaging over 22 °C (72 °F), and mild winters.

Oleshky Sands is located in the Pontic–Caspian steppe ecoregion, a region that covers an expanse of grasslands stretching from the northern shores of the Black Sea to western Kazakhstan.

== Flora and fauna ==
The landscape is quite varied, with sandy-steppe, semi-arid steppe, meadows, reed beds, and forest stands. The dunes of the Radensk sector are interspersed with patches of shrubs, lakes and birch groves (12% of the area).

== Public use ==
The parks' website warns the public of danger from a nearby military installation, and strictly prohibits unaccompanied visits by members of the public.
