= Zaplava =

Village in Kherson Oblast, Ukraine

Zaplava Заплава
- Rural settlement
- Interactive map of Zaplava
- Location of Zaplava within Ukraine Zaplava (Ukraine)
- Coordinates: 46.63°N 32.833611°E
- Country: Ukraine
- Oblast: Kherson Oblast
- Raion: Kherson Raion
- Hromada: Oleshky urban hromada

Area
  - Total: 0.05 km^{2} (0.019 sq mi)
- Elevation: 11 m (36 ft)

Population (2001 census)
  - Total: 117
  - Density: 2,300/km^{2} (6,100/sq mi)
- Time zone: UTC+2 (EET)
  - Summer (DST): UTC+3 (EEST)
- Postal code: 75100
- Area code: +380 5542

Zaplava (Ukrainian: Заплава), known in 2016–2024 as Poima (Ukrainian: Пойма) and before 2016 as Tsiurupynsk (Ukrainian: Цюрупинськ), is a rural settlement in Ukraine, located in Oleshky urban hromada, Kherson Raion, Kherson Oblast.

== History ==
In accordance with decommunization laws in Ukraine, Tsiurupynsk was renamed to Poima by the Ukrainian parliament in 2016. The previous name, Tsiurupynsk, was given in honour of former CPSU Central Committee member and Gosplan chairman Alexander Tsiurupa, born in nearby Oleshky.

During the Russian invasion of Ukraine in 2022, it was occupied by Russia.

On 23 September 2023, the administration of Oleshky urban hromada began discussions on renaming Poima to Zaplava. This was as a result of a decision by the National Commission for State Language Standards on 22 June, determining that the name of the settlement was not in line with state language standards, as it was a transliteration from Russian. Zaplava is the native Ukrainian equivalent of Poima. Poima was one of 43 settlements in Kherson Oblast recommended to be renamed in the decision.

Poima was reportedly recaptured by Ukraine on October 17, 2023 during an incursion across the Dnieper river. Day after, Russian forces retook the village.

In September 2024, Poima was renamed to Zaplava.

== Demographics ==
In 2001 the settlement had 117 inhabitants, native language as of the 2001 Ukrainian census:

- Ukrainian – 93.16%
- Russian – 6.84%
