= Pody, Russia =

Pody Поды
- Selo
- Location within Astrakhan Oblast Location within Russia
- Coordinates: 48°15′N 45°53′E
- Country: Russia
- Region: Astrakhan Oblast
- District: Chernoyarsky District
- Time zone: UTC+4:00

Pody (Russian: Поды) is a rural locality (a selo) in Chernoyarsky District, Astrakhan Oblast, Russia. The population was 798 as of 2010. There are 27 streets.

== Geography ==
Pody is located 33 km northwest of Chyorny Yar (the district's administrative centre) by road. Staritsa is the nearest rural locality.
