= Pody Poe =

Pody Poe (29 November 1932 - 1 November 2006) was a local Oklahoma City gambling crime figure for whom an estimated 13 to 17 million dollars were spent to affiliate him with an organized crime syndicate under the Organized Crime Control Act of 1971.

Born Tracy Coy Poe in Oklahoma City on November 29, 1932, of parents Coy Poe, a songwriter/promoter and Dorothy Minter daughter of J. Oak Minter, a territorial judge in Madill, Oklahoma. Pody's paternal grandfather was a sheriff in Waurika, Oklahoma. According to the Daily Ardmorite (an Ardmore, Oklahoma newspaper) at age two Pody fell out of his father's vehicle at a reported speed of 65 mph. After a doctor's examination and x-ray he was found to have suffered no broken bones. Pody claimed, "This was my second lucky break," the first being born healthy.

Poe spent his early years in Depression era Hollywood with his father who worked at Metro-Goldwyn-Mayer as a producer and managed Pinky Tomlin. After a downturn of luck and an argument with Bing Crosby about recording a song, Poe's father took the family to Kansas City, Missouri and Houston, Texas until the family broke apart. Poe's mother and siblings moved to Oklahoma City. Poe's mother remarried and moved to Tulsa leaving him with his aunts in Oklahoma City

Poe was a caddie at the Oklahoma City Golf & Country Club, he hitch-hiked from his aunt's to and from the course. While working as a caddie he became friends with Ken Rogers, a West Point graduate, who inspired him to be a great short game golfer. After Poe's senior year at Classen High School, he took a job with a friend building a road in Eldorado, Oklahoma and every night they would play pool at the local pool hall. After the summer job was complete Poe had acquired some skill in pool, and in order to save money, he hitch-hiked to the local pool hall near his home in Oklahoma City from El Dorado. Poe made more money his first night in the Oklahoma City poolhall as he had the entire summer working on the highway.

After high school, Poe joined the Air National Guard where, "We kept the World War II relic planes out at Will Roger's Field safe from the Korean Warlords". Poe served fifteen months in the armed services.
