= Pidstepne =

Village in Kherson Oblast, Ukraine

Pidstepne Підстепне
- Village
- Interactive map of Pidstepne
- Location within Kherson Oblast Location within Ukraine
- Coordinates: 46°39′42″N 32°53′37″E
- Country: Ukraine
- Oblast: Kherson Oblast
- Raion: Kherson Raion
- Hromada: Oleshky urban hromada

Area
  - Total: 39 km^{2} (15 sq mi)
- Elevation: 8 m (26 ft)

Population (2001 census)
  - Total: 591

Pidstepne (Ukrainian: Підстепне) is a village in southern Ukraine, located in Oleshky urban hromada, Kherson Raion, Kherson Oblast. According to the 2001 Ukrainian census, the village had a population of 591 people spread across an area of 39 km^2. Since the start of the Russian invasion of Ukraine in 2022, the village has been occupied by Russian troops, but attempts have been made to partially or entirely recapture the village.

== History ==
The village was founded in the middle of the nineteenth century by immigrants from Penza, Kaluga, and some from Right-bank Ukraine and Moldova. During the Great Patriotic War, the village was occupied by German troops from 11 September 1941 to 3 November 1943, before the Soviets recaptured the village. In 1959, the Tsiurupynskyi plant was established, which was a viticultural state farm.

The village was captured by Russian forces during the Russian invasion of Ukraine in 2022. On the night of 17–18 October 2023, it was reported by Russian sources that Ukrainian forces, in a raid across the Dnipro river, had either captured or partially captured Pidstepne along with a couple other villages.

== Demographics ==
According to the 2001 Ukrainian Census, the only official census taken in post-independence Ukraine, the population of the village was 591 people. Of the people residing in the village, their mother tongue is as follows:

Language	Percentage of Population
Ukrainian	96.96%
Russian	3.04%

Previously, according the 1989 Soviet Census, the population of the village was 570 people, of which 253 were men and 317 were women.

== Monuments ==
There is a mass grave of Soviet sailors located in the village.
