= Kostohryzove, Kherson Raion, Kherson Oblast =

Kostohryzove Костогризове
- Village
- Location within Kherson Oblast Location within Ukraine
- Coordinates: 46°30′20″N 32°51′18″E
- Country: Ukraine
- Oblast: Kherson Oblast
- Raion: Kherson Raion
- Hromada: Oleshky urban hromada

Area
  - Total: 55 km^{2} (21 sq mi)
- Elevation: 15 m (49 ft)

Population (1971)
  - Total: 1,924
- Postal code: 75130

Kostohryzove (Ukrainian: Костогризове) is a village in Oleshky urban hromada, Kherson Raion, Kherson Oblast, Ukraine.

== Name ==
There is no consensus on how the village name came to be. According to legends, the Cossacks fought against the Crimean Tatars and Turks with a lesser number of troops and eventually ran out of ammunition, so they forced an attack, which they won. They then left a mound on the graves of their comrades according to Cossack custom, and named the battlefield Kostohryzove. Other versions include the name coming from a former farm on Kostohryzove lake or that it was named after the surname of the Cossack Kostohryz who settled on the lands.

== History ==
Kostohryzove is first mentioned in written sources in 1796. The first settlers were escaped serfs who became state peasants. In January 1918. During the Russian Civil War, Kostohryzove was taken by the Red Army in January 1918, and incorporated into the Soviet Union. During World War I in March 1918 the Germans captured it, and then it was taken over by members of the Allies (Greece, France, Britain), who ruled until March 1919. In 1928, a joint land cultivation called "Gurtova Dela" was established, and in the fall of 1929 a collective farm was established. Collectivization was completed in 1933. During World War II, 334 people from Kostohryzove fought against Nazi Germany on the frontline. 197 of these died, and 117 were awarded medals.

The village was occupied by Russia during the Russian invasion of Ukraine that began in 2022. On 1 June 2023, Yuriy Patlatyi, a collaborationist official in the village, was killed in an explosion under unknown circumstances. Russian occupation officials, reporting on his death, blamed the Armed Forces of Ukraine.
