= Podi Wije =

Podi Wijay was a notorious gang robber from Polonnaruwa.

He terrorised the North Central Province in Sri Lanka .

His legacy includes a song bearing his name written and performed by Anton Jones and the 1988 film Podi Wije.
