= Dneprovsky Uyezd =

- Uezd
- Location in the Taurida Governorate
- Country: Russian Empire
- Governorate: Taurida
- Established: 1842
- Abolished: 1918
- Capital: Oleshky

Population (1897)
  - Total: 212,241

Dneprovsky Uyezd (Russian: Днепровский уезд; Ukrainian: Дніпровський повіт, romanized: Dniprovskyi povit) was one of the subdivisions of the Taurida Governorate of the Russian Empire. It was situated in the northwestern part of the governorate. Its administrative centre was Oleshky.

== Demographics ==
At the time of the Russian Empire Census of 1897, Dneprovsky Uyezd had a population of 212,241. Of these, 73.6% spoke Ukrainian, 19.9% Russian, 3.0% Yiddish, 1.4% Belarusian, 1.3% German, 0.3% Polish, 0.2% Crimean Tatar, 0.2% Moldovan or Romanian and 0.1% Romani as their native language.
