= Dnieper campaign (2022–present) =

Clashes between Russia and Ukraine on the Dnieper delta

- Part of the southern front of the Russo-Ukrainian war (2022–present)
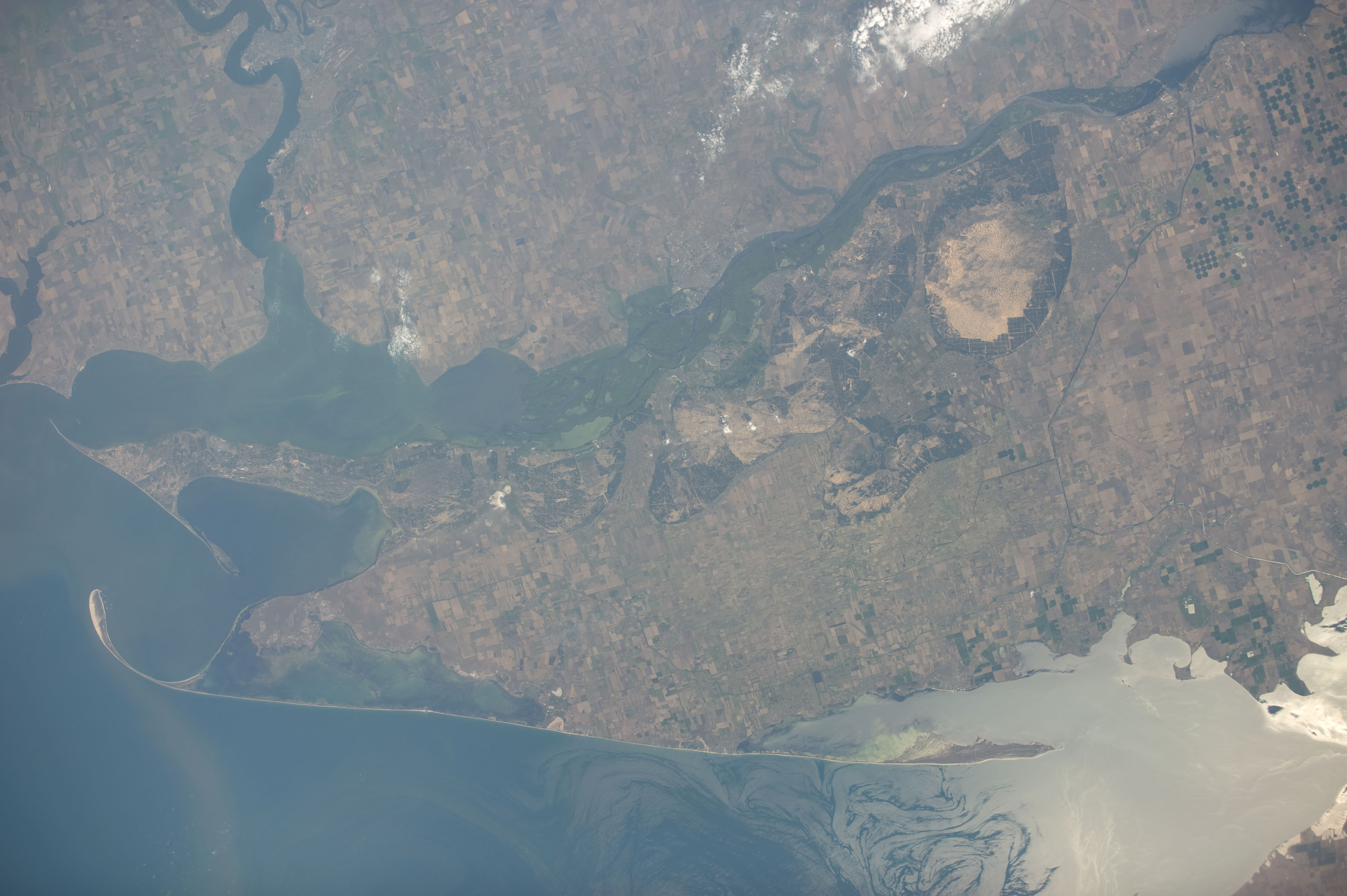
Date	1 September 2022 – present (4 years, 2 months, 1 week and 4 days)
Location	Dnieper (Dnipro) river delta, Kherson Oblast, Mykolaiv Oblast and Zaporizhia Oblast
Result	Ongoing

Belligerents
Russia	Ukraine

Commanders and leaders
Unknown	Yurii Sodol (2022-2024); Unknown

Units involved
Russian Armed Forces; Russian Navy; 61st Separate Guards Naval Infantry Brigade; Coastal Defense Troops; 22nd Army Corps; Russian Ground Forces; Southern Military District; 18th Combined Arms Army; 70th Motorized Rifle Division; 24th Motorized Rifle Regiment; GRU; Spetsnaz GRU; Special Combat Army Reserve; BARS-33; "Smuglyanka" Detachment: "Lotus" drone unit	Armed Forces of Ukraine; Ukrainian Navy; Ukrainian Marine Corps; 35th Marine Brigade; Ukrainian Special Operations Forces; Main Directorate of Intelligence

Strength
Per Ukraine: 64,000 troops (November 2023); 100,000–120,000 troops (July 2024)	Unknown

Casualties and losses
Unknown	262+ KIA, 788 MIA (in Krynky)

The Dnieper campaign is a series of clashes that are occurring along the river Dnieper (Dnipro) in Kherson Oblast, Ukraine, as part of the fighting in the southern theater of the Russo-Ukrainian War. Specifically, this campaign refers to clashes along the river between the Armed Forces of Ukraine and the Russian Armed Forces during and after the Ukrainian counteroffensive to retake Kherson.

== Background ==
=== Initial Russian southern campaign ===
Early in the Russian invasion, Ostriv Velykyi Potomkin, also known as Potemkin Island, came under Russian occupation during the Southern Ukraine campaign.

The Kinburn Spit was not occupied by Russian forces at the beginning of the war. Rather, Russian forces took the spit four months later, on 10 June 2022. The capture of the spit was one of the last significant Russian military victories on the southern Ukrainian front in 2022. Russia fortified the spit after capturing it, and used it as a launching site for missile attacks against Ukrainian-held territory on the right bank of the river.

=== Prior minor raids and engagements ===
In April 2022, the United Kingdom advised Ukrainian forces on the ground to "conduct beach reconnaissance" and locate "good landing locations" on the Kinburn Spit in the case of a future counterattack. The first recorded reconnoiter came in September 2022 by the special forces of Ukraine in rigid inflatable boats. Ukrainian assaults continued, including a successful strike on a Russian equipment grouping on 19 September, and on an ammunition depot on 26 September, which may have been a combat drone control and training center. In October, the Ukrainian Navy's last large ship, the landing ship Yuri Olefirenko, was seen firing rockets at Russian forces on or near the spit, and on 25 October, another ammunition depot was destroyed.

On the morning of 1 September, Ukrainian forces attempted a landing across the Dnieper in the direction of the Russian-occupied Zaporizhzhia Nuclear Power Plant in Enerhodar, but Russian troops successfully repelled the attempt. In the following days and weeks, Ukrainian attempts at amphibious operations across the Dnieper intensified, especially in Zaporizhzhia Oblast.

On the night of 19 October 2022, Ukraine attempted to retake the nuclear power plant again, but failed. The Main Directorate of Intelligence of Ukraine and elite Ukrainian military units were involved in this operation, the latter including the Kraken Regiment, the Shaman Battalion and members of the Ukrainian International Legion.

=== 2022 Kherson counteroffensive ===
During the 2022 Kherson counteroffensive, Ukrainian forces gradually pushed Russian forces in Kherson and Mykolaiv oblasts completely off the land on the right bank of the Dnieper. Ukrainian officials estimated half of the Russian soldiers had been withdrawn across the Dnieper by the evening of 10 November. In the early morning of 11 November, Russian infantrymen were seen walking across a pontoon bridge to the eastern shore. Ukrainian armour and columns closed in on Kherson proper as they moved past several towns, villages and suburbs. As Russian troops retreated across the Dnieper, Ukrainian troops went further into Kherson Oblast and surrounding areas.

Later that day, Ukrainian forces fully retook the city of Kherson and the rest of the right bank. This meant that all territory of Mykolaiv Oblast, save for the Kinburn Spit, was now recaptured by Ukraine.

Also during the Kherson counteroffensive, Ukrainian troops landed on parts of Potemkin Island, but were repelled shortly after.

== Campaign ==
=== Early Ukrainian landings and airstrikes ===
Throughout early November 2022 immediately after the end of the Kherson offensive, there were reports that Ukrainian special operations forces had conducted limited small-boat landings on the Kinburn Spit. On 14 November, Russian forces reportedly launched anti-aircraft missiles on ballistic trajectories at Ochakiv in an alleged attempt to disrupt Ukrainian fire control and to delay further attempts at landings.

On 16 November, Ukraine's Operational Command South reported that their forces had carried out more than 50 strikes around the spit to disrupt Russian shelling and electronic warfare originating from the area. The strikes reportedly killed 17 Russian troops and damaged 18 pieces of military equipment. On 18 and 19 November, Ukrainian attacks on the spit continued, successfully targeting concentrations of Russian forces and equipment. On 22 December, Volodymyr Saldo and another Russian source claimed that Ukrainian forces were regularly shelling Kinburn Spit with long-range artillery and had destroyed a Russian port building there as a result, but that repeated attempts to land on the spit were still being repelled by Russian forces. Ukrainian reconnaissance activities reportedly continued on the Kinburn Spit into early 2023.

=== Intensified Ukrainian incursions ===
On 3 December 2022, Ukrainian forces staged a limited incursion into the east bank of the river. Soldiers from the Carlson air intelligence unit raised a Ukrainian flag on a port crane tower and liberated the surrounding territory.

Potemkin Island has also been a site of continued fighting between the two sides. On 7 December 2022, Ukrainian military officer of the Main Directorate of Intelligence Ihor Oliinyk, commander of a reconnaissance unit operating in the Kherson area, was killed in combat on the island. By 2 January 2023, Ukrainian forces appeared to have established some positions on the island. By 12 May 2023, the Institute for the Study of War (ISW) assessed that Ukrainian forces were operating in the southern portion of the island.

Throughout 23–24 January 2023, Ukrainian forces landed on the left bank of the Dnieper near Nova Kakhovka during an overnight raid. ISW stated that the raid "indicates that Russian forces may not have full control over the entire eastern shoreline of the Dnipro River." On 31 January 2023, Ukrainian forces landed on the left bank of the river again. They briefly established positions before Russian artillery forced them to leave. The ISW reiterated that Russia may not have control over the shoreline, saying that Russian forces likely lacked full control over it. The next day, on 1 February, Ukrainian reconnaissance elements were reported to be near Lake Kruhlyk.

On 23 April, the ISW assessed that Ukrainian forces had crossed the Dnieper river some time on 20 April, or 21 April, and that reports indicated they had liberated the small village of Dachi where the Antonivka Road Bridge spans the Dnieper, posing for photos in front of the entrance sign of Oleshky and returning to Dachi before Russian forces could respond. The Associated Press went on to assess that the swampy Antonivsky island is under Ukrainian control.

On 12 May, the ISW assessed that Ukrainian forces had taken control of Toloka Island and the Zburivsksyi Kut bay at the mouth of the river delta. Additionally, the ISW reported significant partisan activity in Hola Prystan and Oleshky against the Russian administrations there.

=== Destruction of the Kakhovka Dam and 2023 Ukrainian counteroffensive ===
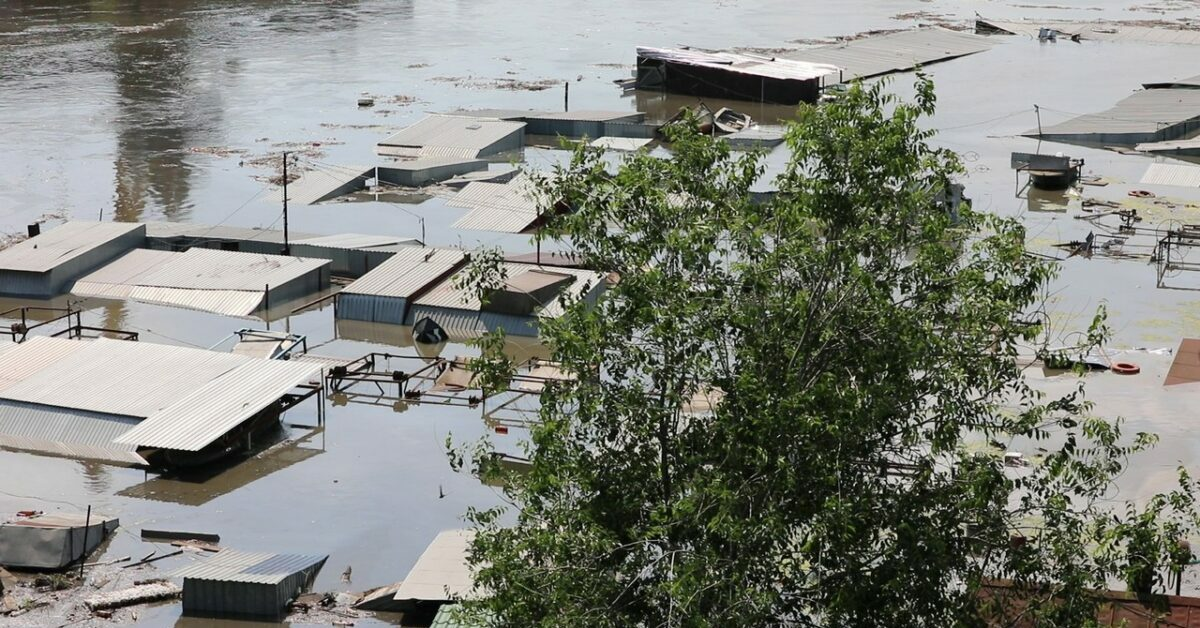
Flooding downstream of the destroyed Kakhovka Dam

On 6 June 2023, the Kakhovka Dam in Nova Kakhovka was purposefully destroyed while under Russian control since March 2022. Western experts assess that Russian forces likely blew the dam up. Ukraine accused Russia of destroying the dam in an effort to hinder the 2023 Ukrainian counteroffensive, while Russia denied responsibility.

Ostriv Velykyi Potomkin was partially submerged below the Dnipro river, necessitating the military forces of both sides to withdraw, and thereby temporarily ending fighting on it.

Due to the destruction of the dam, water levels on the lower Dnieper rose about 5.31 meters, fully submerging the swampy islands in the delta, as well as the whole of Hola Prystan and most of Oleshky. The Russian controlled southern bank is a low lying swamp and floodplain while the northern bank that Ukraine controls is elevated, sparing it from the worst of the flooding. In total, 108 settlements along the Dnieper flooded as the Kakhovka Reservoir continued to drain, with its water level dropping from 16.8 meters to 12.7.

Alongside the civilian cost of the flooding, Russia lost both men and material in the flooding, particularly the 7th Air Assault Division and elements of the 22nd Army Corps. In the aftermath of the flood, Russia withdrew its defensive positions between 5 and 15 kilometers further south, leaving the southern bank virtually undefended. Additionally, the Kinburn Spit has been separated from the mainland due to the flooding, becoming an island on which Ukrainian forces performed an amphibious landing on 8 June. Fighting continued until 9 June. The Kyiv Independent assessed that landings on the Kinburn Spit where diversionary attacks, meant to distract Russian forces, and draw them away from the 2023 Ukrainian counteroffensive and that any long term occupation of the Spit would be "impossible".

Over the ten days after 9 June, Russia started moving its Dnieper Group of Forces (DGF) from the eastern bank of the river to reinforce the Bakhmut and Zaporizhzhia sectors, according to the UK Ministry of Defence.

On 1 July, renewed fighting commenced on the eastern bank of the Dnieper, as Ukrainian forces were reported by the UK Defense Ministry to have "almost certainly" re-deployed forces on the eastern bank. The UK Defense Ministry also reported a buildup of Russian soldiers around Kakhovka to improve defenses there. Russian soldiers apparently made efforts to repel Ukrainian forces from the eastern bank, suffering heavy casualties on the way, according to Euromaidan Press. By 2 July, fighting had intensified within the vicinity of the Antonivka bridge, according to Natalia Humeniuk. The fighting was considered at the time to consist primarily of counter-battery attacks.

On 1 August 2023, the Ukrainians reportedly bombed Russian positions on Dzharylhach Island in the occupied Kherson region near the Black Sea, which they claimed had killed 200 soldiers.

Ukrainian forces again landed on the left bank in August 2023. As of 14 August, they were in control of a "gradually widening" strip of bridgehead on the left bank. This especially includes areas north of Oleshky and west of Kozachi Laheri.

The UK Ministry of Defense reported that the Russian Ministry of Defense was forming the 18th Combined Arms Army, in an effort to consolidate their forces in southern Kherson Oblast, with the core of the new formation being the 22nd Army Corps of the Russian Naval Infantry.

Russian forces target Ukrainian settlements and civilians on the west bank of the Dnieper frequently and on 14 September, killed a 6 year old child in an artillery strike. After this incident, Oleksandr Prokudin, the head of the Kherson Regional Military Administration ordered the evacuation of all families with children from 31 settlements along the Dnipro river. On 15 September, Russian aviation accidentally bombed occupied Nova Kakhovka, killing one and injuring three of the city's inhabitants.

=== Incursion at Krynky ===
In mid-October 2023, Ukrainian Marine brigades succeeded in crossing the Dnieper downstream of the destroyed Kakhovka Dam. Russian sources claimed that on the night of 17–18 October Ukrainian forces crossed the Dnipro and temporarily controlled and partially control the villages of Poima and Pishchanivka, respectively. Additionally, Russian and Ukrainian sources reported Ukrainian raids against Russian positions in the village of Krynky and on Kazatsky Island. The Russian sources stated that the attacks were carried out by the 35th and 36th Marine Brigades and that, besides artillery bombardments, no Russian forces were sent to stem the bridgehead. Ukraine claimed to have established several stable bridgeheads on islands east of the Antonivka bridge between the Dnipro proper and its tributaries, mostly the Konka.

According to an article published by Ukrainska Pravda in November 2024, the main objective of the operation was to push to Crimea and reach the Perekop isthmus, with the second goal being the widening of the Kherson front to draw Russian forces away from the Zaporizhzhia and Donetsk fronts. In the first 3–4 days, the 35th, 36th and 38th marine brigades were supposed to capture a wide 30-kilometer stretch of land from the Antonivka Railway Bridge to Krynky and advance towards the M-14 road. The plan was met with optimism by the most motivated marines, who believed that the operation could change the course of the war. However, not all soldiers shared this sentiment, expressing concerns about the feasibility of such an operation, especially given the losses they've already suffered during the counteroffensive at the Velyka Novosilka axis.

Around late October to early November, the marines were withdrawn from the bridgeheads near Pishchanivka and the railway bridge to focus on the Krynky bridgehead. The 36th was the first brigade to suffer significant losses in the operation, when on 19 October their positions near the railway bridge were hit by Iskander strikes that killed and wounded 90 men. The brigade command also complained about the lack of artillery support and poor logistics.

Russian opposition outlet Meduza said that by early-mid November 2023, Ukraine was in control of "the entire territory of the uninhabited islands upstream almost all the way to the Kakhovka HPP." However, they said that the populated places near those islands at higher elevation were still under Russian control, listing Oleshky, Kozachi Laheri, Korsunka, and Dnipriany as examples. On 13 November 2023, Russian news agencies released a statement saying Russia was moving its troops to "more favourable positions" east of the river, only to retract the announcement a few minutes later. They said the announcement was made in error and was a "provocation". Reuters called it a "highly unusual incident" that "suggested disarray in Russia's military establishment and state media over how to report the battlefield situation in southern Ukraine". On 17 November 2023, the Ukrainian MoD claimed that their forces had killed 1,216 Russian soldiers and wounded 2,217 since they started "measures" on the eastern bank. They also claimed to have destroyed 24 Russian tanks, 48 armored combat vehicles, 89 artillery systems, 29 ammunition warehouses and 14 aircraft in the same period.

By late December 2023, Ukrainian Marines on the east bank of the Dnipro River were suffering heavy losses, without stable gains, but so were Russian forces. Heavy Russian aerial and artillery bombardment, disorganization and dwindling resources were reportedly causing heavy casualties among Ukrainian troops, who nevertheless continued operations against Russian east-bank forces. On 24 December, a Russian brigade admitted to using tear gas (a type of chemical weapon) against Ukraine near Krynky, which would be a violation of international law. 73rd Naval Special Operations Regiment of SSO was also operating in the area in December 2023.

Some 50 BMK-T boats have been damaged or sunk, according to Forbes, to Russian drones, glide bombs and artillery. The noise made by boat engines cannot be disguised easily. A number of Ukrainian Marines expressed to the Kyiv Independent that they thought the crossing was just "political theatre" or a "political decision". The bridgehead varied some 2.5 kilometres to 500 metres in places. Marines complained of having to cover "hundreds of metres" of knee high water without cover from aircraft, artillery or drones. Ukrainian Marines could only dig a hole around 500 millimetres down before they hit the water level. Given the river is under 1000 feet (300 metres) wide, it is too large for a pontoon bridge. Any evacuations must be done by boat. Ukrainian member of parliament Roman Kostenko said in an interview in October 2023: "These were comprehensive operations involving bridge construction, damming, personnel and equipment movement. The bridges constructed there had a lifespan of no more than 40 minutes, and we’re talking about a 25-meter width. The Dnipro River is 300 meters wide at its narrowest point (in the Kherson area), and that’s the smallest. We understand how complex the situation is."

On 21 December, Ukrainian drone commander Robert Brovdi claimed that "in the less than 2.5 months of our stay in the south, we hit more than 450 enemy vehicles on the mentioned strip, 153 of which were burned to ashes".

On December, one Su-24M was shot down over the Black Sea and at least one Su-34s was shot down by Ukrainian air defenses in the country south. These interceptions of Russian aircraft have reportedly led to a reduction in the number of glide bomb attacks. According to the ISW, Russian forces might have to compensate for the loss of aviation support with more artillery, which is vulnerable to counter-battery fire.

On 4 January 2024, The Washington Post reported that, over the course of the offensive on the east bank of the Dnieper Ukraine's armed forces had seized a few square kilometers of land, mainly around Krynky, but had failed to take a single settlement.

On 19 January, the Ukrainians claimed to have killed a Russian "drone ace" called "Moisey" and his team with a drone. They were reportedly responsible for destroying 31 boats carrying 398 Ukrainian soldiers during the battle. On 5 February, it was revealed that Moisey survived but was lightly wounded.

According to Ukrainska Pravda, by late winter or early spring, the situation had deteriorated to the point that no boats could get through the river. The marines had to resort to dropping life vests from drones, so the remaining troops could swim back on their own.

On 2 March, the Ukrainians claimed that they had destroyed 230 armored vehicles and artillery pieces since October, and that their air force had destroyed 300 supply vehicles and 17 small boats over the same period.

On 28 March, the Ukrainians claimed that the Russians attacked with groups of 10 to 15 personnel, without armored vehicle support, and that Russian forces lose 30 to 40 personnel in the area each day.

As of June, the bridgehead probably ceased to exist and there was likely no longer any permanent Ukrainian presence in Krynky.

On 7 July, Ukraine’s Southern Defense Forces claimed to have killed 90 Russian soldiers and destroyed 34 pieces of equipment that day, including four guns, two mortars and 14 armored vehicles.

On 17 July, the number of losses suffered by Ukrainian forces from October 2023 to June 2024 in Krynky was reported to be 262 killed and buried and 788 missing in action.

By 18 July, Russian forces retook the village after Ukrainian withdrawal. As noted by historian Nikolay Mitrokhin, the Ukrainian Krynky campaign had "served the purpose of tying up Russian forces and persuading the Moscow army leadership to move valuable equipment to this location, which was then to be destroyed with drones. There are some indications that the bridgehead actually fulfilled this tactical purpose. Shortly after its surrender, not only did the fierce attacks on the islands in the Dnipro began. The loss of Staromajorske and Urozhajne in the Velyka Novosilka area also dates directly after the Ukrainian withdrawal from Krynky".

=== Nestryha Island ===
On 28 April 2024, Oleksandr Syrskyi reported that Ukrainian forces had captured Nestryha Island at the mouth of the Dnipro (46.5401°N 32.3855°E) and advanced near the village of Veletenske in the Bilozerka settlement hromada. Dmytro Pletenchuk, a spokesman for the Operational Command South, stated that the liberation of the island would make counter-sabotage efforts easier. Control over the island would allow Ukraine to better control the waterways that both Ukrainian and Russian forces use, and was expected to relieve pressure on Krynky. Pletenchuk stated that a forward mortar base would be created on the island for fire control over the rest of the Dnipro mouth. Russian forces recaptured the island by 29 January 2025.

=== 2025 ===
In March 2025, Prokudin claimed that Russian troops were being regularly sent on high-casualty missions to seize a foothold on the right bank of the Dnieper. He suggested they were being ordered to force the river at any cost in order to reinforce Moscow's claim to the whole oblast, in advance of prospective U.S. Trump administration initiated peace negotiations.

On 21 October 2025, Ukrainian intelligence claimed that 5,100 Russian soldiers had died in the Dnipro delta since January of that year, with some of them reportedly dying of starvation due to a lack of supplies.

=== Kinburn ===
On 8 June 2026, the Institute for the Study of War (ISW) reported that Russian forces are withdrawing from the Kinburn Spit. This was according to partisan group Atesh, who said that the 337th Guards Air Assault Regiment of the 104th Guards Air Assault Division were being redeployed to the "Zaporizhia sector" due to disrupted supplies as a result of Ukrainian attacks. Vladyslav Voloshyn, the spokesperson for the Operational Command South, said that the information was currently unconfirmed.

On 25 June forces from Ukraine's 801st Special Marine Detachment installed a Ukrainian flag on the spit.
