= Oleshky =

City in Kherson Oblast, Ukraine

Oleshky Олешки
- City
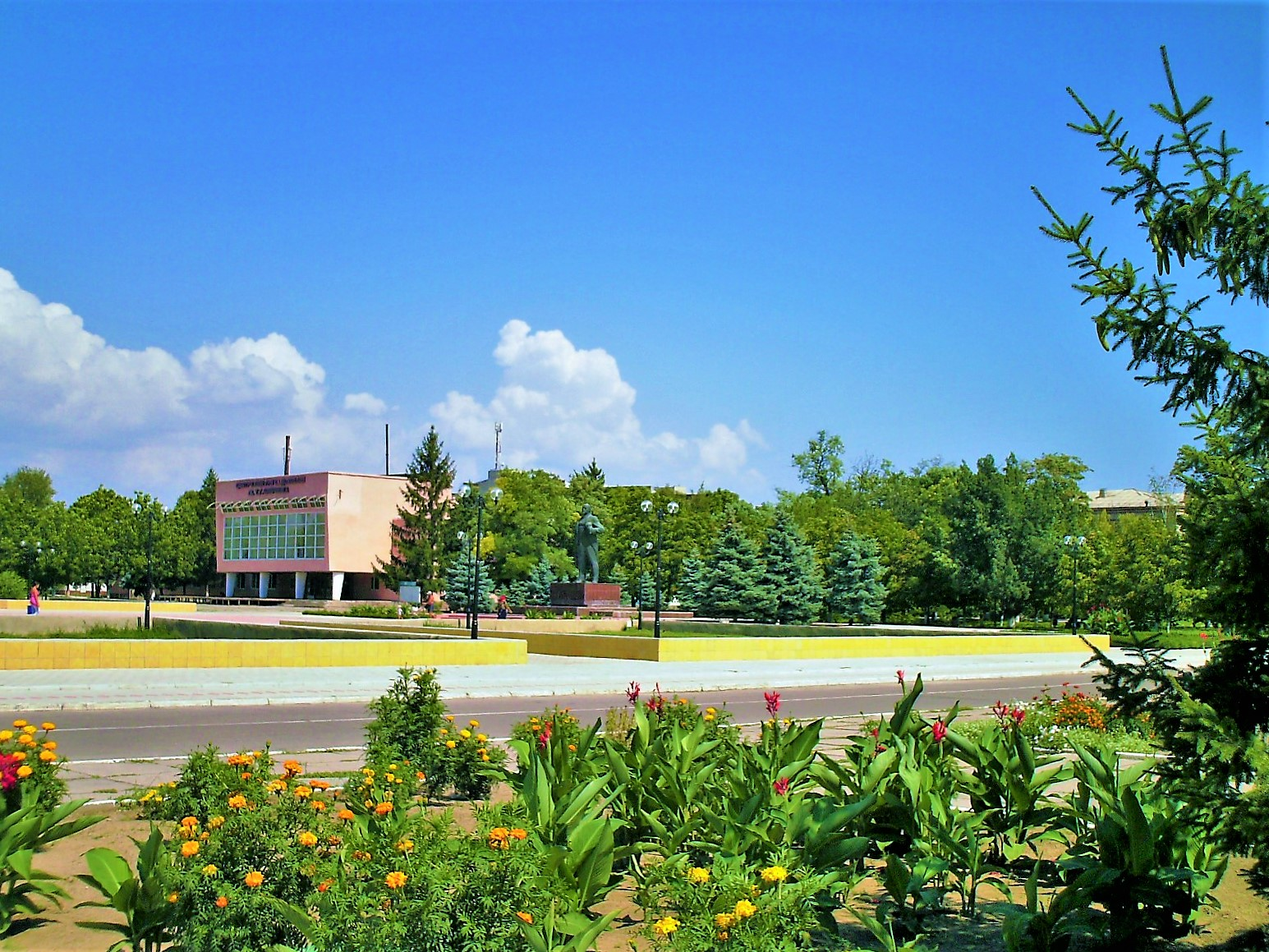
- Central square

- Coat of arms
- Interactive map of Oleshky
- Location of Oleshky Oleshky (Ukraine)
- Coordinates: 46°37′00″N 32°43′00″E
- Country: Ukraine
- Oblast: Kherson Oblast
- Raion: Kherson Raion
- Hromada: Oleshky urban hromada
- Founded: 1784
- Town status since: 1802

Area
  - Total: 15.7 km^{2} (6.1 sq mi)

Population (2022)
  - Total: ▼24,124
  - Density: 1,598/km^{2} (4,140/sq mi)
- Postal code: 75100
- Area code: +380 5542
- Climate: Cfa
- Website: https://oleshki-rada.gov.ua/

Oleshky (Ukrainian: Олешки, pronounced [oˈlɛʃkɪ]), known from 1928 to 2016 as Tsiurupynsk, (Note: Ukrainian: Цюрупинськ; Russian: Цюрупинск, romanized: Tsyurupinsk.) is a city in Kherson Raion, Kherson Oblast, southern Ukraine, located on the left bank of the Dnieper River with the town of Solontsi to the south. It is the oldest city of the oblast and one of the oldest in southern Ukraine. It is known for its proximity to the Oleshky Sands, a large desert region. Oleshky is the site of artist Polina Rayko's home, a national cultural monument of Ukraine. It also hosts the administration of Oleshky urban hromada, one of the hromadas of Ukraine. It had a population of 24,124 (2022 estimate).

Oleshky has been occupied by Russia since 2022. The city's population significantly declined as a result, with only around 2,000 people estimated to live in the city.

As of October 2026 the city is suffering from a humanitarian crisis resulting in a famine from the Russian administration actively blocking humanitarian aid and civilian evacuations, using the crisis to promise support to only those who agree to receive Russian citizenship.

== Geography ==
The city is located in the south of Ukraine, near Kherson. It is a port on the Konka River. The Oleshky Sands are located in close proximity to the town.

== History ==
=== Ancient history ===
The area around Oleshky has been known since antiquity. Herodotus mentioned Scythian forests in the mouth of the Dnieper in the 5th century BCE, which were called "Oleshye" (from the Slavic word for forest) by the Slavs. The area has been inhabited since ancient times: stone molds for metal casting have been found near the city dating back to the Late Bronze Age, indicating the existence of a bronze tool workshop.

The settlement of Oleshia has been known since medieval times. Its name was derived from the forest area, and is related to the modern name "Oleshky". Until the 10th century, the town belonged to the Byzantine sphere of influence, but then became a client of Kievan Rus.

It is believed by some historians that Oleshia existed from the 10th to the 13th century as a large Slavic trading city, which was a stronghold of Kievan Rus in the lower Dnieper. It was a major port and important fishing site. A trade route from Kyiv to Byzantium and the Transnistria region ran through the city. Eventually, the site of Oleshia became a Genoese trade colony. In the mid-15th century, Oleshia was destroyed by the Ottoman Empire, which established Ochakiv nearby as a post to control the Dnieper River.

From the 15th to 18th century, the territory of modern Oleshky was under the control of the Crimean Khanate, who permitted the Zaporozhian Cossacks to settle there. After the Cossacks sided with the enemies of Russian Tsar Peter the Great, they were driven from their settlements along the Kamianka River in 1711. The Crimean Khanate permitted the Zaporozhians to establish a Sich on the Khanate's territory. The Cossacks established the Oleshky Sich above the Dnieper–Bug estuary near where the modern town of Oleshky is located. Eventually in 1734, the Cossacks were officially allowed to return to the Russian Empire.

=== Tsarist Russia and the Soviet Union ===
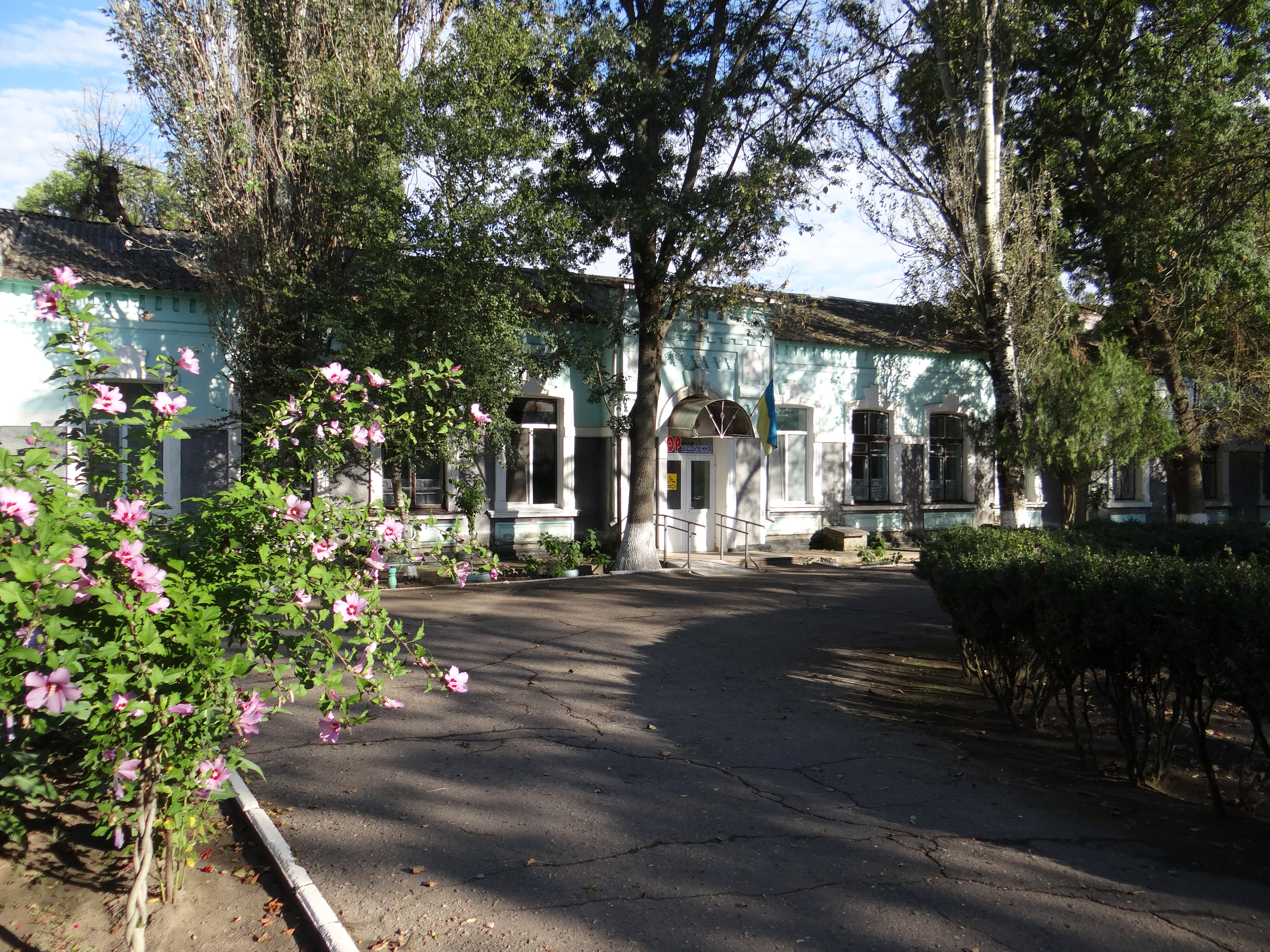
Old architecture in Oleshky

Intensive settlement of the region around Oleshky began in 1783 after the annexation of Crimea by the Russian Empire. In May 1784, fifty state peasants settled at the site of the Cossack fortress Oleshky and founded a settlement of the same name. In 1785, they were joined by another 258 people. The settlement was originally part of Taurida Oblast, until this administrative unit was abolished in 1796. It was transferred to the short-lived second Novorossiya Governorate until that too was abolished in 1802. In 1802, after the formation of the Taurida Governorate, Oleshky became the seat of Dneprovsky Uyezd within the governorate. Oleshky was also granted town status.

The Tsarist government was interested in rapidly settling the Taurida region. Due to this as well as Oleshky's status as uyezd center, contributed to rapid growth of the small town during the early 19th century. In addition to state peasants, other citizens from various backgrounds settled in the town. By 1832–33, 2,908 people lived in the town, and there were 430 houses. The population grew rapidly again during the Crimean War in 1853–1856, when Oleshky became a supply point for the Russian army, and troops passed through the town on their way to defend Sevastopol. By 1859, the number of residents in Oleshki had reached 6,500 people.

During World War I, Oleshky was occupied by the Central Powers during their 1918 invasion of Ukraine. The town changed hands several times during the Russian Civil War, and was largely destroyed by war. At the end of the war, Oleshky finally fell under control of the Bolsheviks, who established the communist Soviet Union on much of the former territory of the Russian Empire. In 1928, the Soviet government renamed the town Tsiurupynsk after former Soviet Trade Minister and the chief of Gosplan Alexander Tsiurupa, who was born in the town. After transferring it repeatedly between different short-lived administrative divisions between 1920 and 1944, Oleshky was eventually subordinated to Kherson Oblast of Soviet Ukraine.

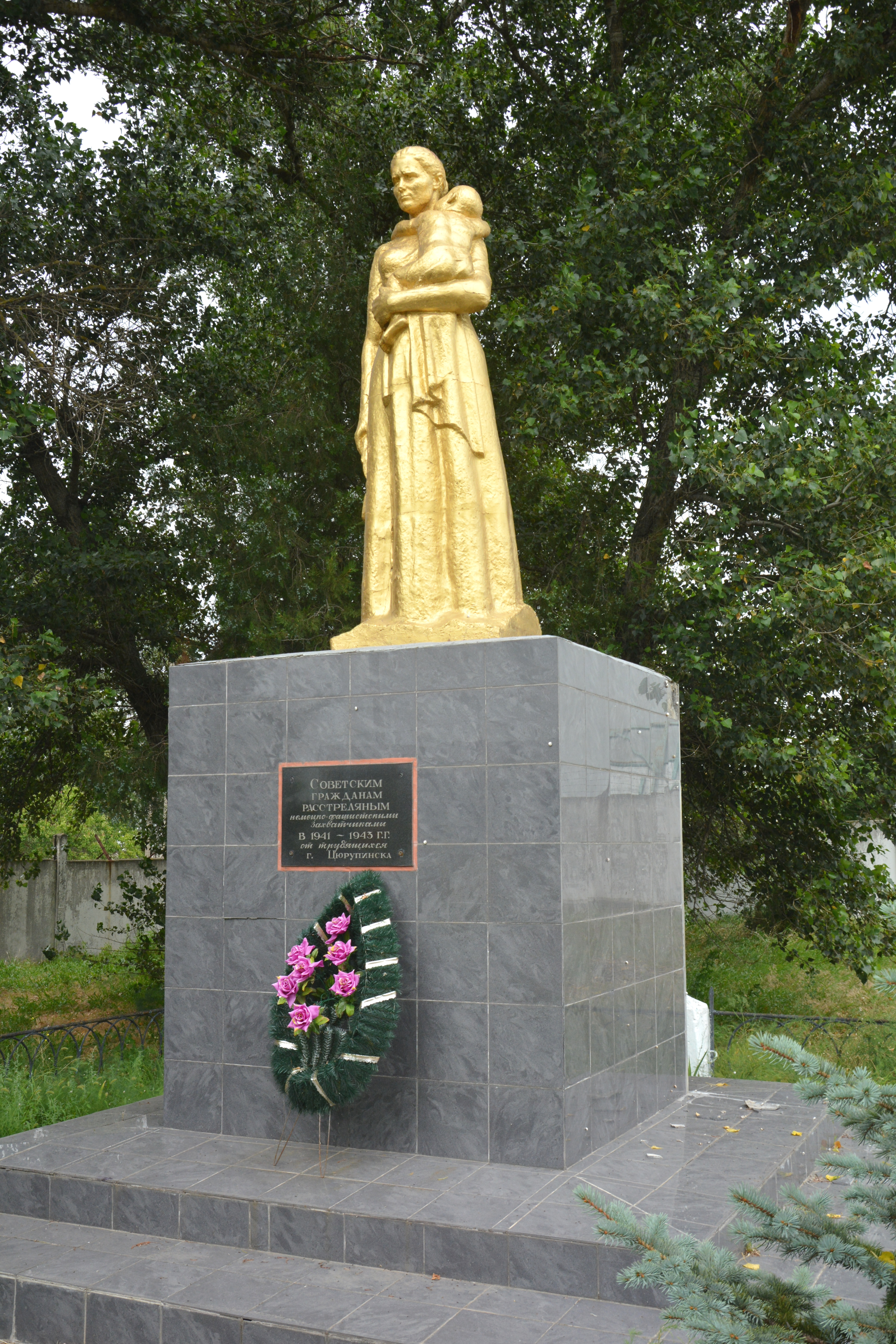
Mass grave of victims of Nazi Germany

Tsiurupynsk was occupied by German troops on 10 September 1941. In late September or early October 1941, some 800 Jews from Tsiurupynsk and its vicinity were murdered at a site east of the town. In 1943, the children of mixed marriages between Jews and non-Jews were murdered in Tsiurupynsk. According to Soviet sources, a total of 2,160 civilians in Oleshky and neighboring localities were murdered by the Nazis, and 356 were deported to Germany for forced labor. Tsiurupynsk itself was liberated by the Red Army on 4 November 1943, but German troops held onto a bridgehead near the Tsiurupynsk railway station nearby until 20 December 1943.

=== 21st century ===
On 21 November 2007, the town council adopted resolution No.296 to restore the name Oleshky. The town council deputies and district councils, as well as the local Cossacks, wrote a letter to then president Victor Yushchenko requesting that the petition be carried out. It was not until 19 May 2016 that the Verkhovna Rada (Ukraine's national parliament) adopted the resolution to rename Tsiurupynsk as Oleshky and conform to the law prohibiting names of Communist origin after a 9-year campaign by the town's council and residents.

Oleshky urban hromada was created in June 2020 in accordance with an edict by the Ukrainian government determining the territories of hromadas in the Kherson region, by uniting the Oleshky city municipality with various village councils in Oleshky Raion. Until 18 July 2020, Oleshky was the administrative center of Oleshky Raion. The raion was abolished in July 2020 as part of the administrative reform of Ukraine, which reduced the number of raions in Kherson Oblast to five. The area of Oleshky Raion was merged into Kherson Raion.

==== Russian invasion of Ukraine ====
On 24 February 2022, Oleshky was occupied by Russian forces in the 2022 Russian invasion of Ukraine. On 14 April, Russian forces removed the flag of Ukraine from the town hall and replaced it with a Russian flag. Seven months later, Russian forces withdrew from Kherson city and the part of the region north of the Dnipro river in November 2022. Ukraine's National Resistance Center announced in December that all Russian collaborators had left Oleshky.

On 20 March 2023, Russia reinstated the name Tsiurupynsk for the town, stating that it was "part of the reversal of the renamings" that had taken place after the 2014 Revolution of Dignity, which they referred to as "the coup d'état in Kyiv."

In June 2023, Oleshky was almost completely flooded as a result of the destruction of the Kakhovka Dam, with the water rising to roof level for many buildings. Oleshky lost its centralized water supply and electricity, while gas supplies were also cut off. In 2023, the city's population declined from approximately 25,000 to 3,000–4,000.

Owing to its geography, Oleshky is situated between the Dnipro floodplains, which are under Ukrainian fire control, and Russian forces positioned beyond the city on the opposite side. On 15 March 2025, Ukrainian forces destroyed a strategically important bridge near Oleshky, preventing Russian troops from expanding their control over the Dnipro estuary islands.

Starting in December 2025, Oleshky experienced a worsening food crisis after three vehicles carrying food were destroyed by mines on the city's only remaining access road, while a local merchant transporting pension money and bread from Skadovsk was shot dead and robbed, further disrupting supplies to the city and forcing residents to increasingly rely on food grown in their own garden plots and on hunting wild birds and hares to survive. The situation was made even more difficult due to the lack of medicine. Russian administration in occupied territories provided support only to those inhabitants who agreed to accept Russian citizenship. Several packages of humanitarian aid were delivered by Ukrainian forces with the help of drones.

As of 2026, the population of Oleshky had declined to approximately 2,000 residents, most of them elderly people and their caregivers, as well as men who remained in the city for fear of failing the filtration procedures at Russian checkpoints.

On October 20, 2026, MEP Pina Picierno, Vice-President of the European Parliament, announced that she would go on hunger strike in solidarity with the plight of the people of Oleshky. Pope Leo XIV also called for a ceasefire to allow the residents to leave. In late October, Melania Trump allegedly brokered a 6-day ceasefire in southern Ukraine, including Oleshky. Humanitarian operations were able to start, food and medicine were delivered, and residents were able to evacuate. This was later disclaimed by an Irish journalist Caolan Robertson.

== Economy ==
As of 2023, Oleshky had a cellulose and paper factory, a fish-processing plant, a juice-making factory, and a winery.

== Demographics ==
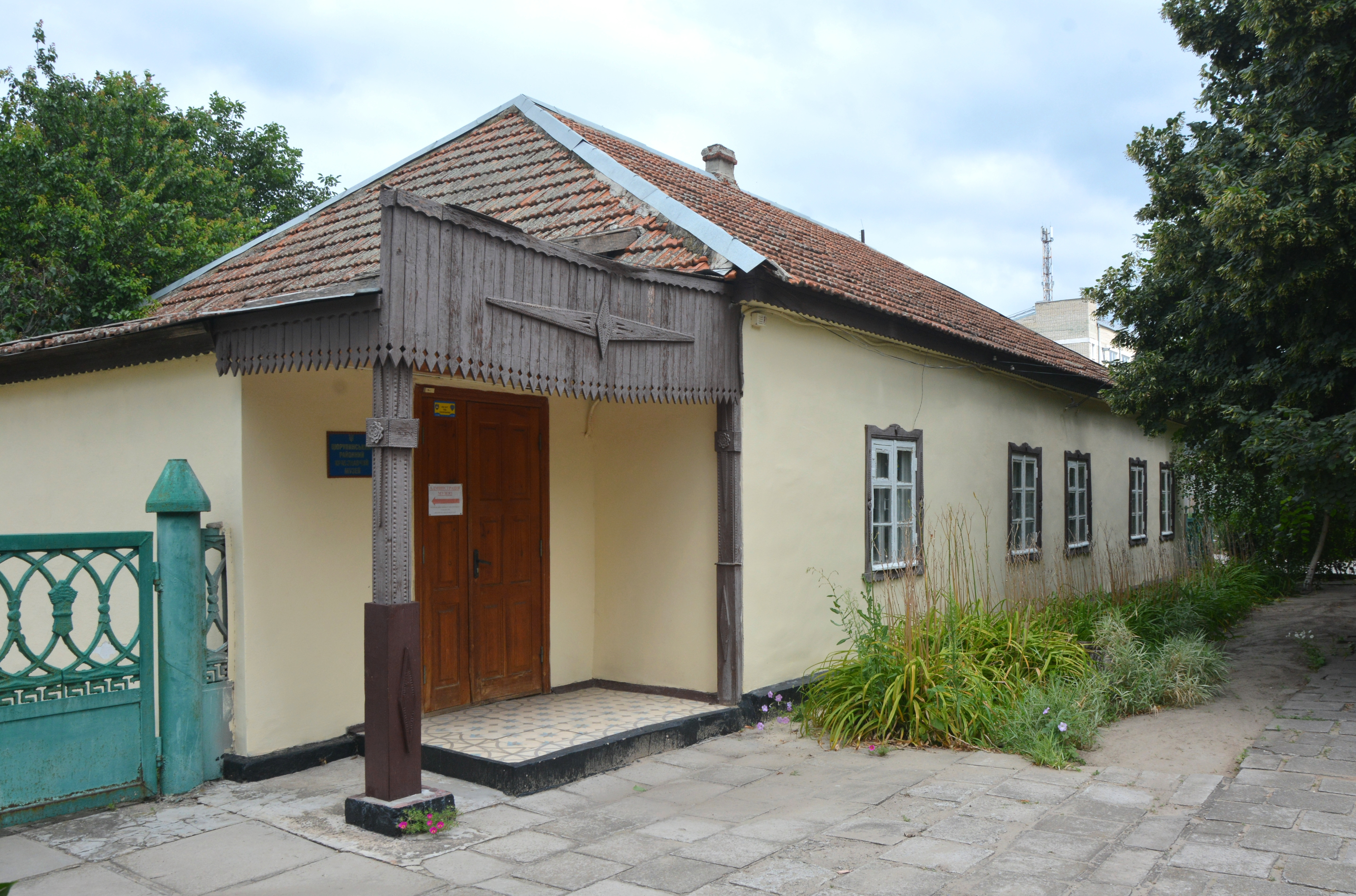
Local History Museum, 2016

Ethnic makeup of the city according to the 2001 Ukrainian census:

Ethnic groups in Oleshky (formerly Tsyurupinsk)
	percent
Ukrainians	78.37%
Russians	18.41%
Belarusians	0.77%
Gypsies	0.54%
Armenians	0.44%
Bulgarians	0.17%
Moldovans	0.15%
Tatars	0.15%
Poles	0.14%
Jews	0.11%

== See also ==
- List of renamed cities in Ukraine
- Blockade of Oleshky

== Other sources ==
- Е. М. Поспелов (Ye. M. Pospelov). "Имена городов: вчера и сегодня (1917–1992). Топонимический словарь." (City Names: Yesterday and Today (1917–1992). Toponymic Dictionary.) Москва, "Русские словари", 1993.
