= Kherson Raion =

Subdivision of Kherson Oblast, Ukraine

Kherson Raion Херсонський район
- Raion
- Interactive map of Kherson Raion
- Country: Ukraine
- Oblast: Kherson Oblast
- Established: 2020
- Admin. center: Kherson
- Subdivisions: 10 hromadas

Area
  - Total: 3,841.9 km^{2} (1,483.4 sq mi)

Population (2022)
  - Total: 450,233
  - Density: 117.19/km^{2} (303.52/sq mi)
- Time zone: UTC+02:00 (EET)
  - Summer (DST): UTC+03:00 (EEST)
- Postal index: N/A

Kherson Raion (Ukrainian: Херсонський район; Russian: Херсонский район) is a raion (district) of Kherson Oblast, Ukraine.

== History ==
Kherson Raion was created on 18 July 2020 as part of the reform of administrative divisions of Ukraine. The center of the raion is the city of Kherson. The city of Oleshky to the south of Kherson is the second largest city, and the largest in the former Oleshky Raion. Two abolished raions, Bilozerka and Oleshky Raions, as well as Kherson Municipality, were merged into Kherson Raion. Population: 450,233 (2022 estimate).

== Subdivisions ==
At the time of establishment in 2020, the Kherson administrative district was subdivided into 10 hromadas:

- Bilozerka settlement hromada with the administration in the rural settlement of Bilozerka, transferred from Bilozerka Raion;
- Chornobaivka rural hromada with the administration in the village of Chornobaivka, transferred from Bilozerka Raion;
- Darivka rural hromada with the administration in the village of Darivka, transferred from Bilozerka Raion;
- Kherson urban hromada, with the administration in the city of Kherson, transferred from Kherson Municipality;
- Muzykivka rural hromada with the administration in the village of Muzykivka, transferred from Bilozerka Raion;
- Oleshky urban hromada with the administration in the city of Oleshky, transferred from Oleshky Raion;
- Stanislav rural hromada with the administration in the village of Stanislav, transferred from Bilozerka Raion;
- Velyki Kopani rural hromada with the administration in the village of Velyki Kopani, transferred from Oleshky Raion;
- Vynohradove rural hromada with the administration in the village of Vynohradove, transferred from Oleshky Raion;
- Yuvileine rural hromada with the administration in the settlement of Yuvileine, transferred from Oleshky Raion.
