= 39th Marine Brigade =

Ukrainian military unit

39th Marine Brigade 39th Coastal Defense Brigade (2025–2026) 126th Territorial Defense Brigade (2022–2025)
- 39-та окрема бригада морської піхоти
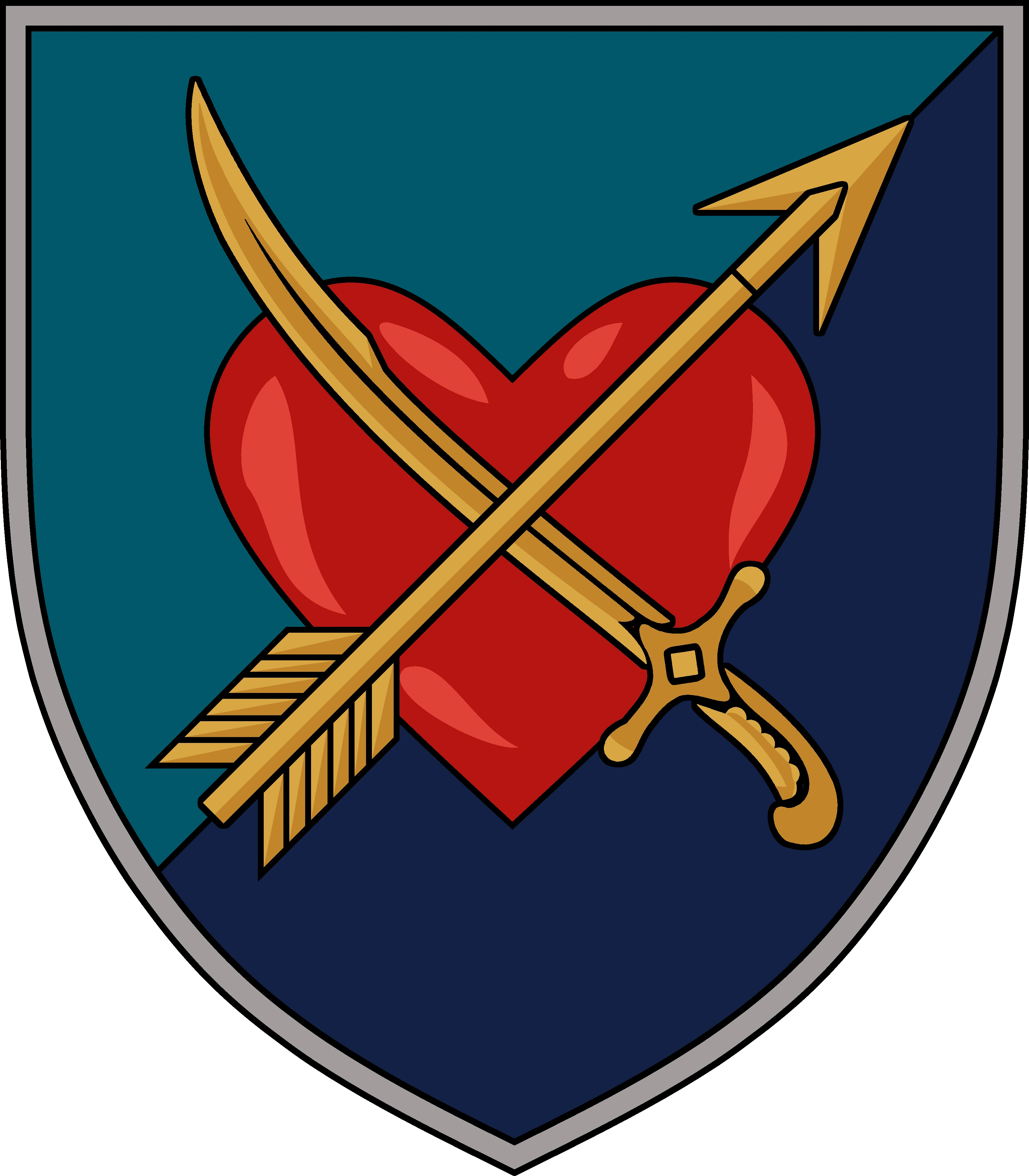
- Active: 2022–present
- Country: Ukraine
- Branch: Ukrainian Marine Corps
- Type: Marines
- Role: Marine Infantry
- Size: Brigade
- Part of: 30th Marine Corps
- Garrison/HQ: Odesa, Odesa Oblast
- Nickname: Black Sea Cossacks
- Motto: On Black Sails
- Engagements: Russo-Ukrainian War; Russian invasion of Ukraine; Southern Ukraine campaign; 2022 Kherson counteroffensive; Dnieper campaign (2022–present); Battle of Krynky; Eastern Ukraine campaign; Battle of Chasiv Yar; Northern Ukraine border skirmishes; 2025 Sumy Oblast incursion
- Decorations: For Courage and Bravery
- Website: Official Recruitment Website

Commanders
- Current commander: Lieutenant Colonel Andriy Moroz

Insignia
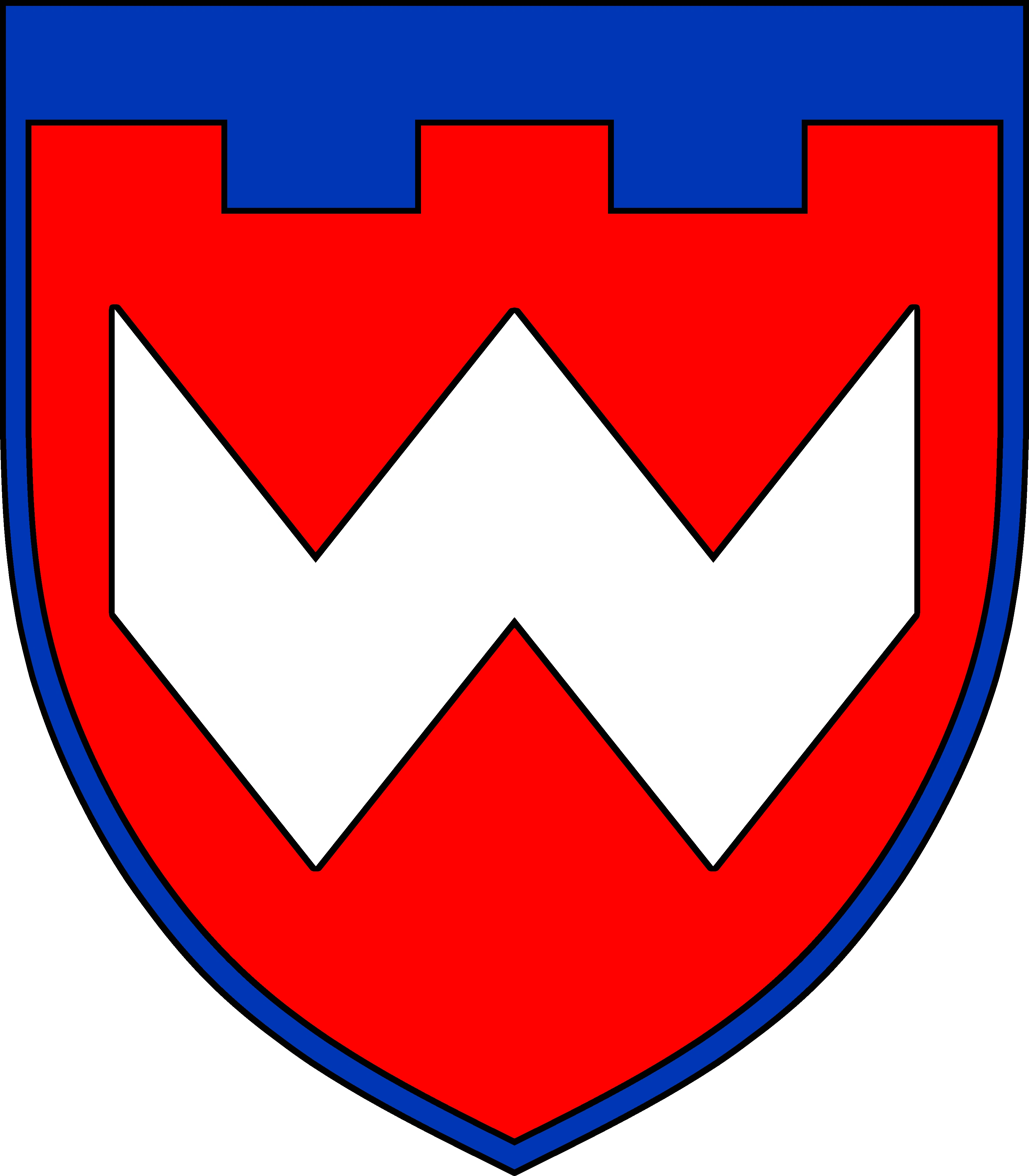
- 126th Brigade (2022 – 2024)

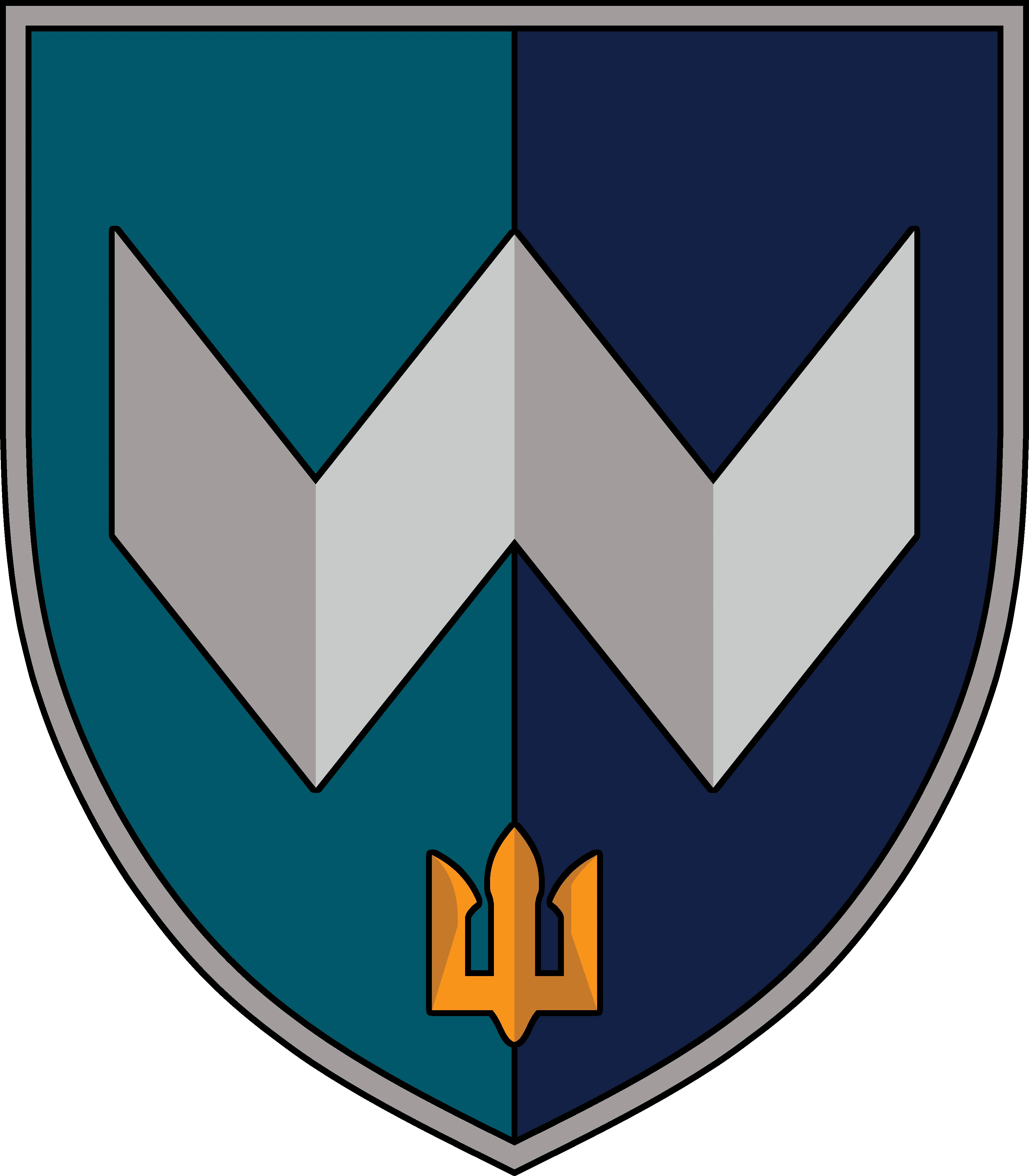
- 126th Brigade (2024 – 2025)

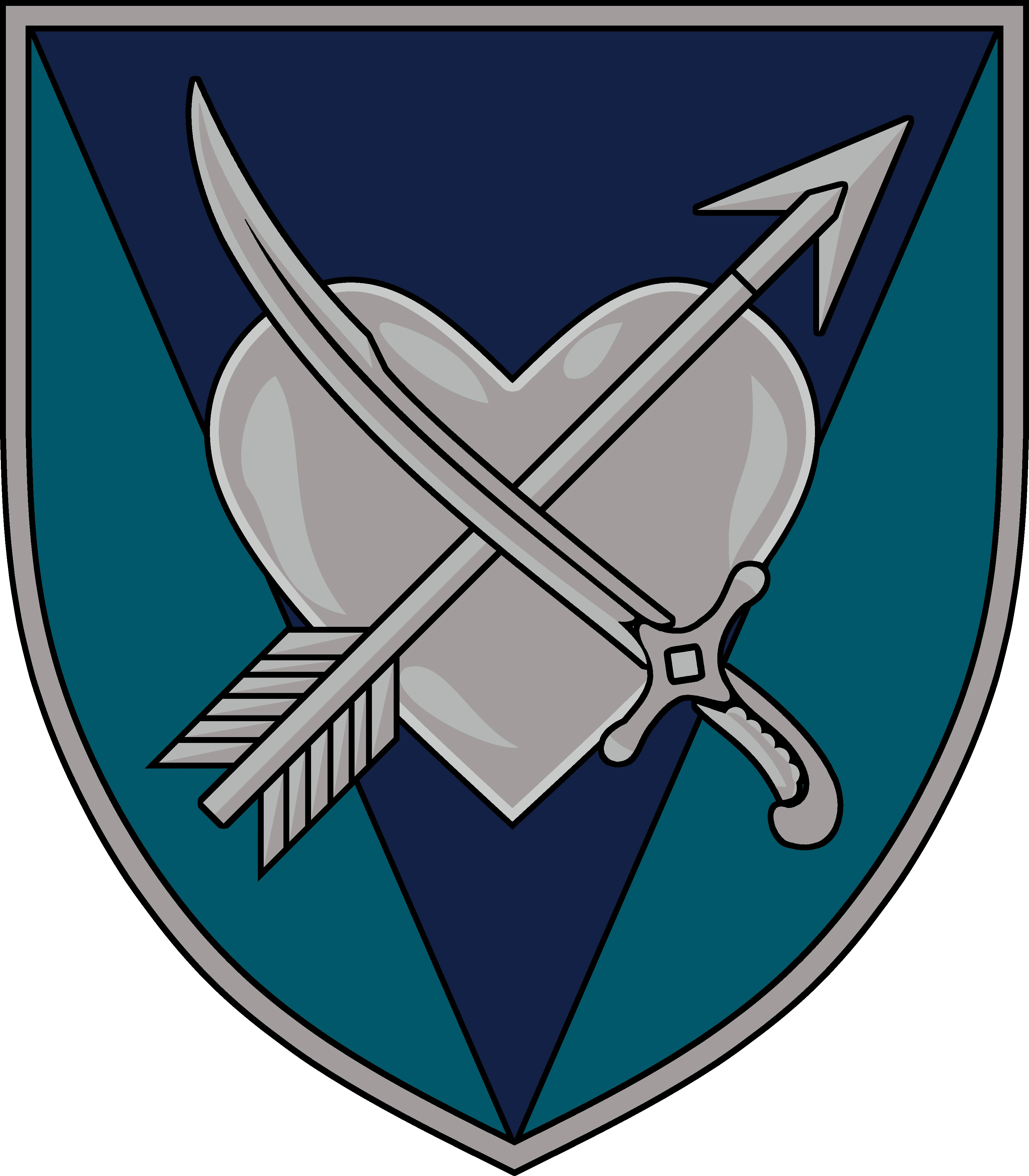
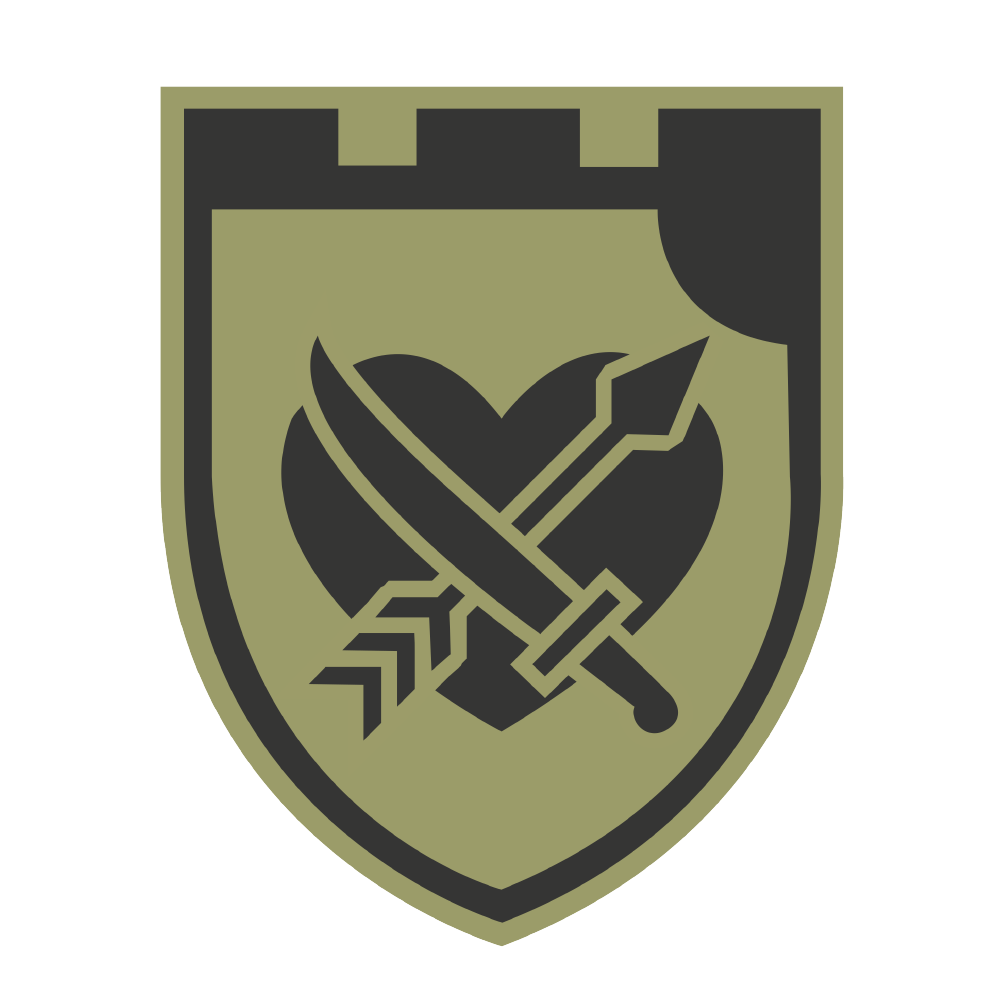
- 39th Brigade Alternate Insignia

The 39th Separate Marine Brigade named after the Black Sea Cossacks (Ukrainian: 39-та окрема бригада берегової оборони імені Чорноморських козаків), formerly the 126th Territorial Defense Brigade is a unit of the Ukrainian Marine Corps in Odesa. The unit was founded as the 126th Territorial Defense Brigade until being transferred to the Ukrainian Marine Corps March, 3, 2025.

== History ==
=== Formation ===
The Head of the Odesa Regional Military Administration, Maksym Marchenko, announced that a new Territorial Defense brigade would be formed in Odesa on 5 March 2022. On 8 March the brigade was formed in Odesa, the organisational core was made up of instructors from the Odesa Military Academy. The next day the brigade began accepting reservists. 23 March is the official date of creation of the Brigade. On May 12 the Brigade had already trained an additional two thousand troops.

Colonel Larysa Yakobchuk was appointed as a deputy commander for moral and psychological support. She is the first female deputy commander in the Territorial Defense Forces.

=== Russo-Ukrainian War ===
==== Russian invasion of Ukraine ====
While digging trenches near Odesa in May, units of the Brigade unearthed amphorae, estimated to be from the fourth or fifth centuries BC. All findings were given to the Odesa Archaeological Museum.

Units of the brigade's 220th Territorial Defense Battalion held positions near the border of Mykolaiv and Kherson Oblasts in July 2022. Two members of this battalion were killed in action in December 2022 in the village of Olhivka, Kherson Oblast.

In 2022, the "Chimera" unit was formed in the brigade, it was a small close-knit formation made up of soldiers with previous combat experience. They fought near Mykolaiv when Russian forces were closing in on the city. The unit was involved in the liberation of the right bank of Kherson region. The brigade also had two company tactical groups, "Hunter" and "Oscar", helping liberate Kherson Oblast.

The brigade helped liberate the villages of Maksymivka, Zelenyi Hai, Posad-Pokrovske, Myrne, Blahodatne, Barvinok, Muzykivka, Tsentralne and Kherson city during the 2022 Kherson counteroffensive. As of June 2025, the 1st Coastal Defense Battalion of the brigade has been fighting in Sumy Oblast for several months.

On 4 December 2022, the brigade received its battle flag.

In February 2024, the Chimera Unit was integrated into the DIU's Tymur Special Unit.

On 30 September 2024 the unit was awarded the honorary award For Courage and Bravery by the President of Ukraine Volodymyr Zelenskyy.

On March of 2025 it was confirmed the Vedmedi Assault Group, founded in 2015 as part of the Ukrainian Volunteer Corps, joined the 39th Coastal Defense Brigade.

In October 2025 the 39th Coastal Defense Brigade began operation in the Left Bank of the Kherson regions. The Brigade was involved in a series of precision strikes that destroyed a Russian command post for unmanned aerial vehicle complexes, field ammunition depots, antenna communication nodes, transport vehicles, and personnel of Russian formations. The Brigade also would use Mistral Air Defense to shoot down Shahed drones in the Kherson region.

==== Ukrainian Marine Corps ====
On 3 March 2024, the 126th Territorial Defense Brigade was transferred to the Ukrainian Marine Corps. On 20 February 2025, the brigade was transformed into the 39th Coastal Defense Brigade.

In early 2026 the unit was reorganized and renamed. The 39th Coastal Defense Brigade therefore becoming the 39th Marine Brigade.

=== Sport ===
In late 2024, the basketball team "126 Brigade" was created on the basis of the brigade and plays under the Odesa City Basketball Federation.

== Structure ==
=== 2022 ===
As of 2022, the 126th Territorial Defense Brigade's structure was as follows:

- 126th Territorial Defense Brigade
  - Brigade Headquarters
    - Management
    - Commandant Platoon
  - 220th Territorial Defense Battalion MUN А7395
    - "Raider" Unit
  - 221st Territorial Defense Battalion MUN А7396
  - 222nd Territorial Defense Battalion MUN А7397
  - 223rd Territorial Defense Battalion MUN А7398
  - 224th Territorial Defense Battalion MUN А7399
  - 245th Territorial Defense Battalion
  - 246th Territorial Defense Battalion MUN А4437
    - "Chimera" Unit. Commander: Oleksandr "Chimera" Kapshin.
      - Company Tactical Group "Hunter"
      - Company Tactical Group "Oscar"
  - Mortar Battery
  - Engineer Company
  - Logistic Company
  - Signal Company

=== Current ===
As of 2025, the 39th Coastal Defense Brigade's known structure is as follows:

- 39th Marine Brigade (Coastal Defense/Amphibious)
  - Brigade Headquarters and HQ Services
    - Management
    - Commandant Platoon
  - 1st Coastal Defense Battalion. Commander: Captain Artem Khrystyn.
    - 3rd Company
      - 1st Platoon
    - Fire Support Company
  - 2nd Coastal Defense Battalion. Commander: Lieutenant Colonel Andriy Avdievsky.
  - 3rd Coastal Defense Battalion. Commander: Lieutenant Roman Kryvoruchko.
  - 4th Coastal Defense Battalion
    - Strike UAV Platoon
  - Vedmedi Assault Group
  - Platoon of Ground Robotics Systems
  - 39th Marine Artillery Battalion Commander: Maj. Viktor Komarov
  - Mortar Battery
  - Electronic Warfare Company. Commander: "Fox"
  - Combat Stress Control Group
  - Medical Company. Commander: Yevhen Bayun.
  - "Raiders" Marine Instructor Unit
  - Recruitment Service. Commander: Lt. Aliona Vinokur
  - Patronage Service

== Equipment ==
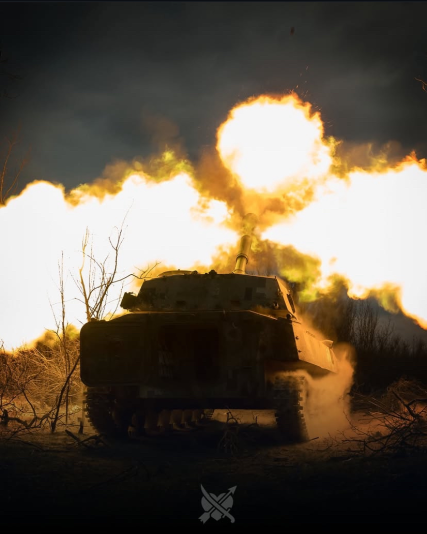
A 2S1 Gvozdika of the 39th Coastal Defense Brigade fires at Russian positions in Kherson Oblast.

=== Small arms ===
- FN Minimi Mk3 – Belgian light machine gun
- RPG-7 – Soviet hand-held rocket launcher
- RPG-22 – Soviet disposable rocket-propelled grenade
- AT4 – Swedish disposable anti-tank weapon

=== Artillery ===
- 120 KRH 92 – Finnish 120 mm mortar
- D-20 – Soviet towed howitzer
- D-30 – Soviet howitzer

=== Vehicles ===
- 2S1 Gvozdika – Soviet self-propelled howitzer
- International MaxxPro – American MRAP armored fighting vehicle
- Oshkosh M-ATV – American MRAP
- MT-LB-S – Ukrainian armored personnel carrier
- Pansarbandvagn 302 – Swedish infantry fighting vehicle

== Commanders ==
- Colonel Serhii Kuts (2022 – 2023)
- Colonel Vadym Mykha (2023 – August 2024)
- Colonel Oleksandr Tonenchuk (August 2024 – July 2025)
- Lieutenant Colonel Andriy Moroz (July 2025 – present)

== Insignia ==
The coat of arms of Sydir Bily.

The 39th Coastal Defense Brigade's insignia shows a saber crossed with an arrow, placed over a heart, which forms the basis of the coat of arms of Sydir Bily, a kish otaman of the Black Sea Cossack Host.

== See also ==
- Territorial Defense Forces of the Armed Forces of Ukraine
- Marine Corps of the Armed Forces of Ukraine
