= Myrne, Bilozerka settlement hromada, Kherson Raion, Kherson Oblast =

Village in Kherson Oblast, Ukraine

Myrne Мирне
- Interactive map of Myrne
- Location in Ukraine Myrne (Ukraine)
- Coordinates: 46°42′26″N 32°14′52″E
- Country: Ukraine
- Oblast: Kherson Oblast
- Raion: Kherson Raion
- Hromada: Bilozerka settlement hromada

Area
  - Total: 0.574 km^{2} (0.222 sq mi)

Population (2001)
  - Total: 143
- Postal code: 75014
- Area code: +380-5547

Myrne (Ukrainian: Мирне) is a village in the Bilozerka settlement hromada of Kherson Raion, Kherson Oblast, Ukraine. The population of the village in 2001 during the most recent Ukrainian census was 143 people.

The village was formerly known as Chervonyi Podil (Ukrainian: Червоний Поділ) until 2016, when decommunisation laws took effect and the village was renamed to Myrne. It was formerly temporarily occupied by Russian forces following the start of the 2022 Russian invasion of Ukraine until the 2022 Kherson counteroffensive.

== History ==
The village was occupied by Nazi Germany from 17 August 1941 to 14 March 1944, when it was liberated by Soviet Army troops. During the Soviet era, it was subordinate to the Nadezhdivka silrada within the Bilozerka Raion.

In 2016, as part of the decommunisation laws in Ukraine, the village was renamed from Chervonyi Podil (Ukrainian: Червоний Поділ; "red lowland") to its present name of the fairly generic toponym of Myrne (Ukrainian: Мирне; "peaceful"). In June 2020, during administrative restructuring, the village became part of the Bilozerka settlement hromada. A month later, in July, after the liquidation of the Bilozerka Raion it also became part of the Kherson Raion. The village was occupied soon after the start of the 2022 Russian invasion of Ukraine, alongside the rest of Kherson Oblast. During the 2022 Kherson counteroffensive, the city was liberated by Ukrainian forces alongside the rest of the hromada on 11 November 2022. The village has since been shelled by Russian forces.

== Demographics ==
According to the 2001 All-Ukrainian Census, the only official nationwide census taken in post-independence Ukraine, the population of the village was 143 people. This number was down from the last recorded nationwide census of 1989 in the Soviet Union, which recorded 156 people in the village, with 70 men and 86 women. An unofficial estimate put the 2021 population at 134 people and the 2022 population just before the war at 132 people.

=== Languages ===
In Dniprovske, according to the 2001 All-Ukrainian Census, the most dominant mother tongue language by far is the Ukrainian language, which was spoken by 92.31% of the population. The Russian language made up the minority at 4.89% of the population. There were also three other people who spoke either Moldovan (Romanian language) or the Belarusian language. One person put "other".

Languages	2001
Ukrainian	92.31%
Russian	4.89%
Moldovan (Romanian language)	.18%
Belarusian	.088%
Other (N/A)	.088%

== Transport ==
The closest major road to the village is European route E97, which starts in Kherson and continues on into Crimea, proceeding into the route of the M-highway (international highway) of M17. The nearest railway station is Chekhovychi, which runs as part of Odesa Railways and is located east in the village of Kyselivka.
