= Dniprovske, Kherson Oblast =

Village in Kherson Oblast, Ukraine

Dniprovske Дніпровське
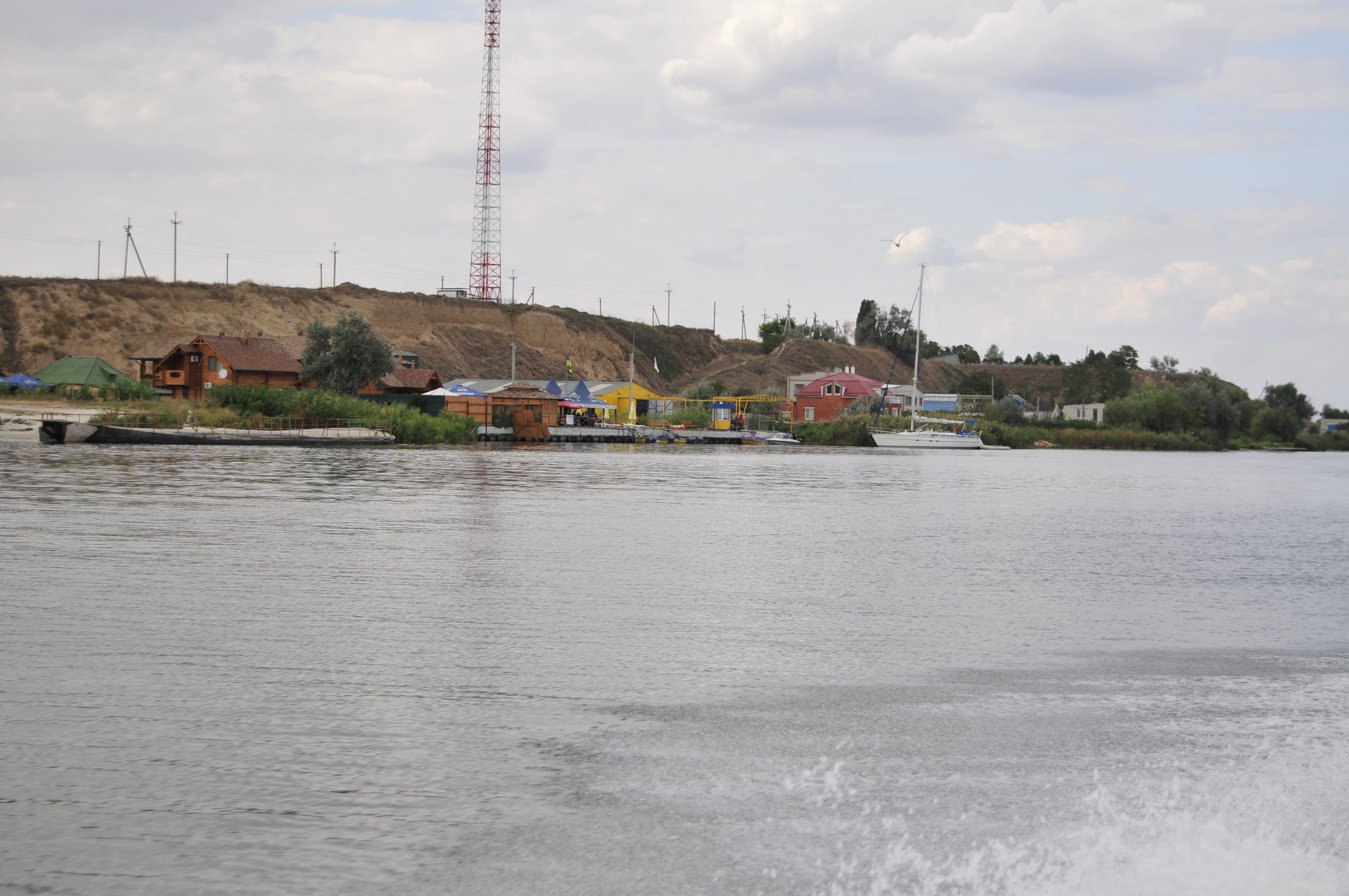
- Dniprovske from the shoreline
- Interactive map of Dniprovske
- Location in Ukraine Dniprovske (Ukraine)
- Coordinates: 46°35′16″N 32°27′58″E
- Country: Ukraine
- Oblast: Kherson Oblast
- Raion: Kherson Raion
- Hromada: Bilozerka settlement hromada
- Founded: 1931

Area
  - Total: 556 km^{2} (215 sq mi)

Population (2001)
  - Total: 1,139
- Postal code: 75003
- Area code: +380-5547

Dniprovske (Ukrainian: Дніпровське) is a village in the Kherson Raion of Kherson Oblast, Ukraine. Its population was 1,139 people according to the last census, the 2001 Ukrainian Census, although estimates from 2023 due to the Russian invasion of Ukraine put the actual number of permanent residents at 10.

The village was populated at least back to the 4th century BC, as there is an excavation site within the village for an ancient settlement known as Bilozerka. The modern village was settled sometime around the late 19th century when residents from the modern-day rural settlement of Bilozerka settled into the area, which in 1931 was officially recognised as a village. After its occupation during World War II, it became a regional agricultural site, hosting a state farm known as "Bilozersky" and a wine farm known as Kherson Vintrust. It has also since been home to a fishing center known as the Dnipro Delta.

During the 2022 Russian invasion of Ukraine, the village was quickly occupied by Russian forces, and it took until a few months later during the 2022 Kherson counteroffensive for the city to be liberated by Ukrainian forces. The village has since then been heavily shelled by Russian forces, which has led many of the residents to move away and it has since been called a ghost town.

== History ==
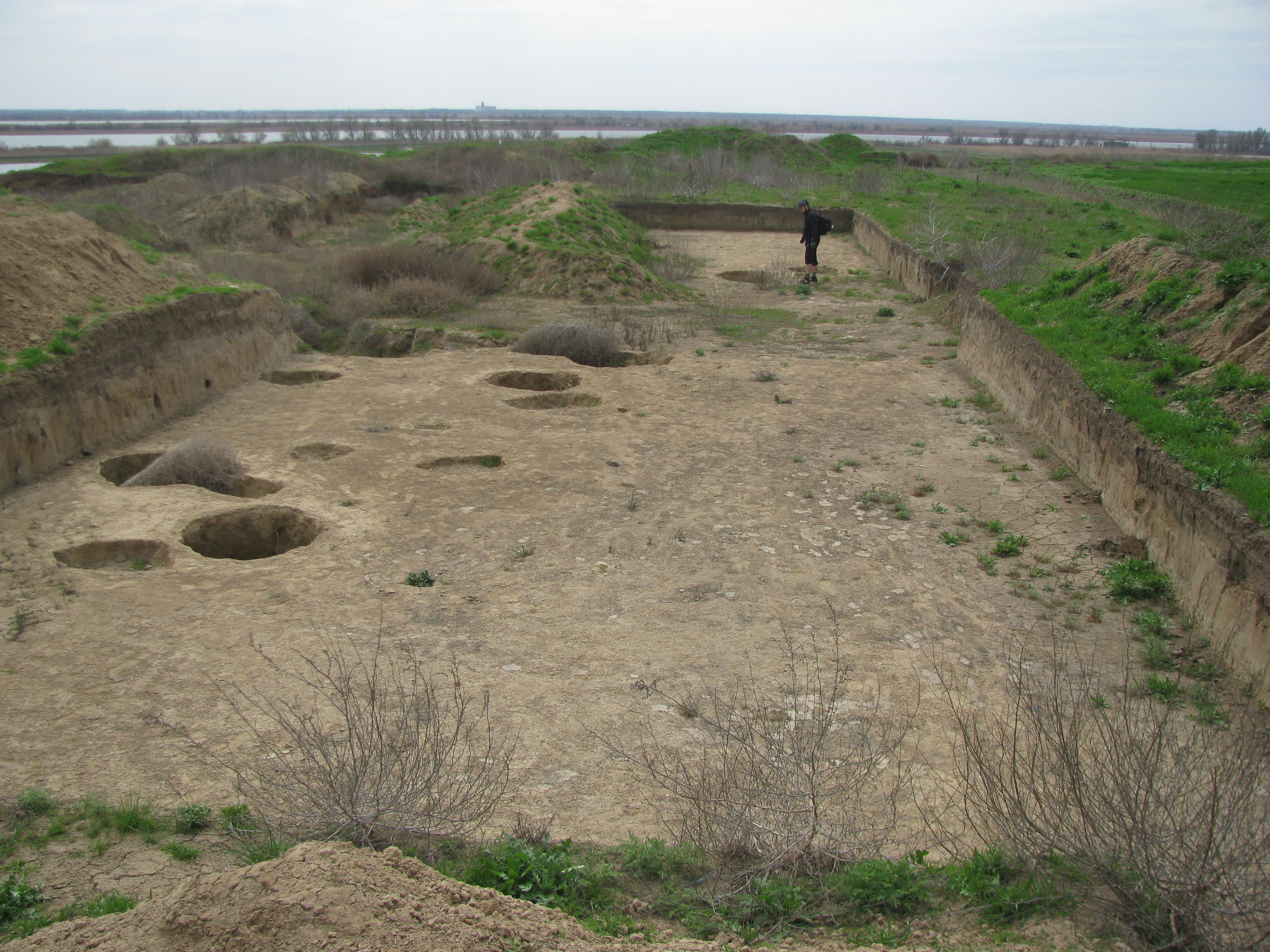
An excavation site of a hillfort in Dniprovske.

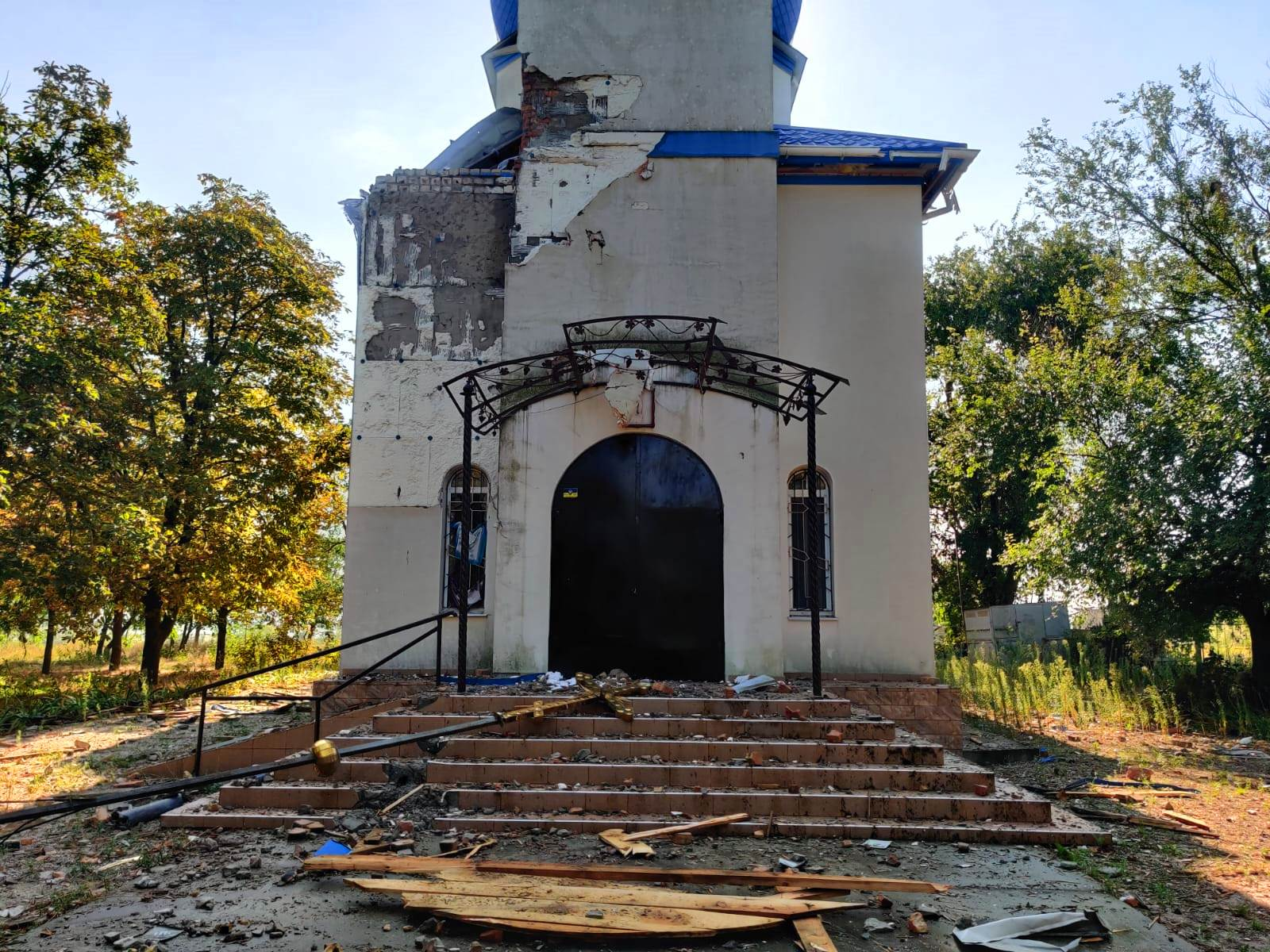
Church of the Ascension in Dniprovske after Russian shelling in August 2023.

There is an excavation site within the village that has been named as the ancient settlement of Bilozerka. It has been under excavation by archaeologists for more than 100 years, mostly by the Kherson Museum of Local Lore who have worked on the site since 1989 and Kherson State University. They have found that the ancient settlement of the village existed from the 4th century BC to the 3rd century BC, and had a size of around 100 by 400 metres. There have been some findings of roof tiles and many household pits, although much of the site has been destroyed when the land was used for agricultural purposes.

The modern village site was settled around the end of the 19th century to the early 20th century, when peasants from the rural settlement of Bilozerka resettled into the area into a settlement that unofficially went under the name Hlynyshche. An agricultural plant was later founded in this settlement in 1929, and in 1931, the village was officially recognised as part of Kherson Oblast under the name "Dniprovske", meaning "of the Dnieper". This was because in March 1931 a new cooperative of the Kherson Combine Plant was opened within the village.

During World War II, the village was temporarily occupied by Nazi Germany from August 1941 to 14 March 1944. During this time, the village was partially destroyed and burnt down when the Nazis retreated in 1944. The village was liberated by members of the 295th Rifle Division of the Soviet Army. After the war, the village was entirely reconstructed, and an experimental seed state farm was opened up on the territory known as "Bilozersky", which in 1955 started specialising in grape production. After Ukrainian independence, a new wine farm known as Kherson Vintrust was also opened up. In June 2020, during administrative restructuring, the village became part of the Bilozerka settlement hromada. A month later, in July, after the liquidation of the Bilozerka Raion it also became part of the Kherson Raion.

The village was occupied soon after the start of the 2022 Russian invasion of Ukraine, alongside the rest of Kherson Oblast. During the occupation, the Russian military seized the state farm of Bilozersky in June, and began exporting its harvest to Crimea. During the 2022 Kherson counteroffensive, the city was liberated by Ukrainian forces alongside the rest of the hromada on 11 November 2022. In August 2023, the village's local church, Ascension Church, was badly damaged by shelling from Russian forces. Since then, the village has been the frequent target of Russian shelling, alongside the rest of the liberated territory on the right side of the Dnieper within Kherson Oblast. An estimate of the population in January 2023 found that only around ten people remained in the village due to the village now being in the line of fire, and it is reported that there are almost no surviving homes in Dniprovske and has now been called a ghost village.

== Demographics ==
According to the 2001 All-Ukrainian Census, the only official nationwide census taken in post-independence Ukraine, the population of the village was 1,139 people. This number was up from the last recorded nationwide census of 1989 in the Soviet Union, which recorded 1,103 people in the village, with 563 men and 540 women. An unofficial estimate put the 2021 population at 1,066 people and the 2022 population just before the war at 1,054 people.

=== Languages ===
In Dniprovske, according to the 2001 All-Ukrainian Census, the most dominant mother tongue language by far is the Ukrainian language, which was spoken by 86.92% of the population. The Russian language made up the minority at 12.82% of the population. There were also three other people who spoke either Moldovan (Romanian language) or the German language.

Languages	2001
Ukrainian	86.92%
Russian	12.82%
Moldovan (Romanian language)	.18%
German	.088%

== Education ==
Prior to 1948, there was no school in the village, and instead, all children were sent to Bilozerka. In 1948, a new elementary school was opened in the village, and in 1963, a new eight-year school. A secondary school serving the village was finally opened in September 1970, and it serves 178 students. In 2019, a ranking done by the European Institute of Innovation & Technology (EIT) found that the school was the ninth best secondary school within Kherson Oblast.

There is also a combined preschool and kindergarten within the village, which has a capacity of 103 people.

== Economy ==
In addition to the winery and state farm, the village is also home to an enterprise that is an experimental sturgeon breeding plant on the Dnieper, which began operating in February 1985. The Dnipro Delta recreation center for fishing was also a tourism attraction within the oblast prior to the war.

== Transport ==
The closest major road to the village is European route E97, which starts in Kherson and continues on into Crimea, proceeding into the route of the M-highway (international highway) of M17.

== Attractions ==
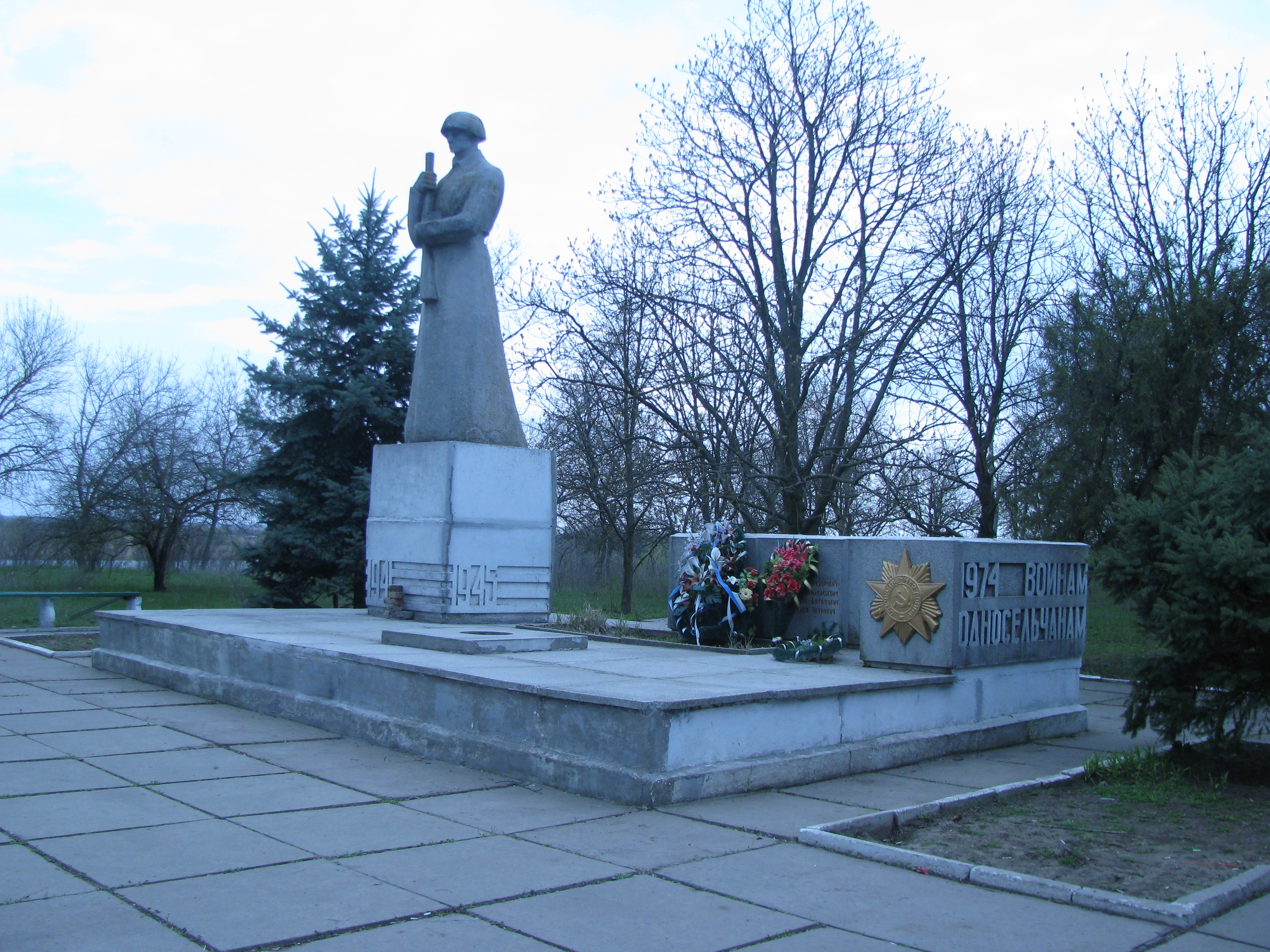
Mass grave of Soviet Army soldiers in Dniprovske.

Within the Park of Glory in the village in 1975, a monument to the fellow soldier-liberators was opened up on the anniversary of Victory Day. In 1990, a stele in honour of Victory Day was also constructed.
