= Skorokhodov =

Skorokhodov (Russian: Скороходов, feminine: Skorokhodova is a Russian surname derived from the word скороход meaning fast walker. Notable people with the surname include:

- Denis Skorokhodov (born 1981), Russian football player
- Gleb Skorokhodov
- Igor Skorokhodov (born 1986), Russian ice hockey forward
- Olga Skorokhodova (1911–1982), Soviet scientist, therapist, teacher and writer
- Sergey Skorokhodov, Russian opera singer (tenor)
