= Barvinok =

Barvinok (from East Slavic languages: барвинокъ, lit. 'Vinca') may refer to:

== Surname ==
- Alexander Barvinok, Russian mathematician
- Hanna Barvinok, Ukrainian writer and folklorist
- Volodymyr Ivanovych Barvinok, Ukrainian historian
- Volodymyr Barvinok, Kyrgyz sociologist and politician

== Other ==
- Barvinok (magazine), former Ukrainian children's magazine
- Barvinok Ukrainian School of Dance, Ukrainian dance ensemble and school

== Places ==
- Barvinok, Kherson Oblast, a village in Ukraine
- Barvinok, Zakarpattia Oblast, a village in Ukraine
