= Zelenyi Hai, Kherson Raion, Kherson Oblast =

Rural locality in Kherson Oblast, Ukraine

Zelenyi Hai Зелений Гай
- Village
- Interactive map of Zelenyi Hai
- Location of Zelenyi Hai within Ukraine Zelenyi Hai (Ukraine)
- Coordinates: 46°49′44″N 32°25′3″E
- Country: Ukraine
- Oblast: Kherson Oblast
- Raion: Kherson Raion
- Hromada: Chornobaivka rural hromada
- Time zone: UTC+2 (EET)
  - Summer (DST): UTC+3 (EEST)

Zelenyi Hai (Ukrainian: Зелений Гай) is a village in Kherson Raion, Kherson Oblast, southern Ukraine. It belongs to the Chornobaivka rural hromada, one of the hromadas of Ukraine. The village has an area of 0.603 km2, with a population of 145 people according to the 2001 Ukrainian Census, the only official post-independence census taken.

== History ==
According to the National Book of Remembrance of the Victims of the Holodomor of 1932-1933 in Ukraine, which was published in 2008 and compiled on the basis of data from the Book of Civil Status Acts in the State Archive of Kherson Oblast, 4 people in the village died during the Holodomor committed by the Soviet government. During the Great Patriotic War, the village was occupied by German troops from 17 August 1941 to 14 March 1944, before the village was retaken by Soviet troops.

== Administrative status ==
Until 18 July 2020, Zelenyi Hai belonged to Bilozerka Raion. The raion was abolished in July 2020 as part of the administrative reform of Ukraine, which reduced the number of raions of Kherson Oblast to five. The area of Bilozerka Raion was merged into Kherson Raion.

== Demographics ==
According to the 2001 Ukrainian Census, the only official census taken in post-independence Ukraine, the population of the village was 145 people. Of the people residing in the village, their mother tongue is as follows:

Language	Percentage of Population
Ukrainian	92.41%
Moldovan (Romanian language)	4.14%
Russian	2.76%
Other	0.69%

Previously, according the 1989 Soviet Census, the population of the village was 177 people, of which 83 were men and 94 were women.
