= Kizomys =

Village in Kherson Oblast, Ukraine

Kizomys Кізомис
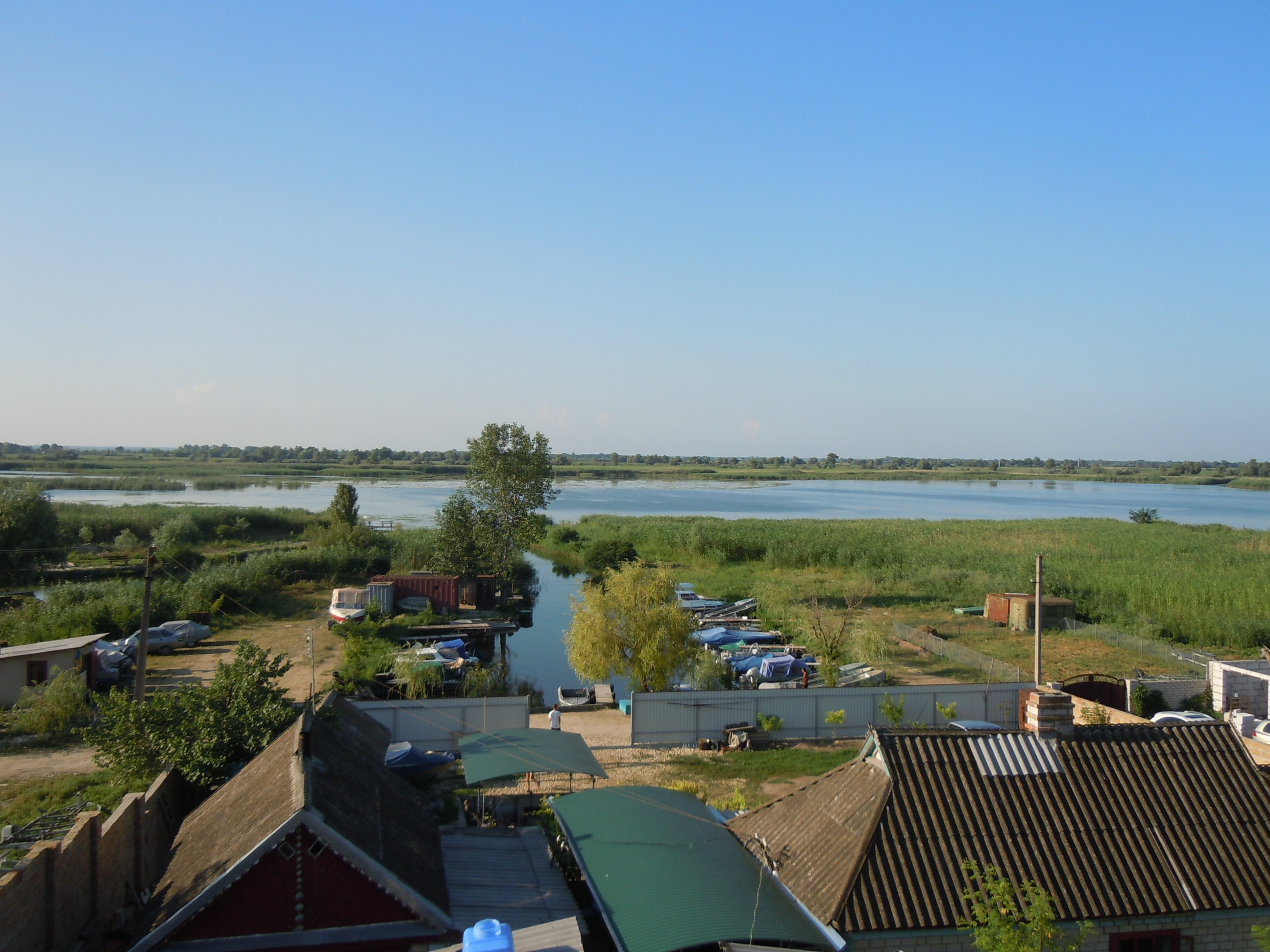
- View of the Dnieper Delta from Kizomys
- Interactive map of Kizomys
- Location in Ukraine Kizomys (Ukraine)
- Coordinates: 46°33′39″N 32°20′9″E
- Country: Ukraine
- Oblast: Kherson Oblast
- Raion: Kherson Raion
- Hromada: Bilozerka settlement hromada
- Established: 1783

Area
  - Total: 2.39 km^{2} (0.92 sq mi)

Population (2001)
  - Total: 1,797
- Postal code: 75005
- Area code: +380-5547

Kizomys (Ukrainian: Кізомис) is a village in the Kherson Raion of Kherson Oblast, Ukraine. Kizomys was officially founded in 1783, after having been a Zaporizhzhian Cossack settlement. Its population was recorded as being 1,797 people in 2001, although in mid-2023 it was reported that the village had fewer than a hundred residents due to constant Russian shelling since the 2022 Russian invasion of Ukraine.

== Name ==
Kizomys comes from the words "kiziy Mys", which translates from Crimean Tatar as "Maiden's Braid".

== History ==
=== 1774-1917: Cossacks and Russian Empire ===
The village was first mentioned as a settlement in 1774 as a post of the Zaporizhzhian Cossacks under the name "Kizomys", before they left the territory at the end of the Russo-Turkish War (1768–1774). After four years, in 1778, the land in the Kizomys tract was given to the Russian Lieutenant General S.M. Rzhevsky. Ivan Gannibal eventually overrode Rzhevsky's land tract, giving it to settlers from the Balkans, including Albanians, Bulgarians, Serbs, and Moldavians, although they did not stay long. The modern-day village of Kizomys was then founded on 28 July 1783, when Grigory Potemkin, when he was governor-general of Russia's new southern provinces, granted the lands to Vice Admiral F. Klokachov. During this time period, the village was known as Rusovo, Fedorivka (after Klokachov), or the old name of Kizomys. Serfs were then brought in by Klokachov to reside in the village, with a school being opened in 1785. By the 1890s, the landowners Rozan and Kasperov owned almost all of the land and water resources in Kiozmys. During the subsequent 1905 Russian Revolution, villagers participated in the events, which were eventually squashed, although in 1909 the old school from 1785 was reorganised into a zemstvo school. Two lighthouses were also built in 1912 in Kizomys; one was a small red one near the shore, and the other was a large one 1 km from the shore.

=== 1917-1991: Soviet era ===
Mass grave and monument to Soviet soldiers during World War II.

During the Russian Civil War, Soviet power was established in 1918, although it was quickly overruled when the Central Powers intervened to help the Ukrainian People's Republic following the Treaty of Brest-Litovsk. After the Central Powers started to leave in 1919, Soviet power was re-established, and land redistribution began. However, the White movement then entered, briefly occupying the village also until the Red Army re-took it and started a revkom. By the end of the year, the revkom was reorganised into a village council. After the war ended, an agricultural artel known as "Red Cape" was created. Later on, the village of Kasperovko (or Novo-Ivanivka) was annexed into Kizomys.

A few years later, in 1924, a reading room was opened, alongside a fishermen's association headed by I.I. Marysh. Later that year, the fishing cooperative "Druzhba" was also established. Nearly two decades later, World War II began, and the village was occupied by Nazi Germany on 17 August 1941. Of the village's occupants, 240 fought in the war on the side of the Soviets, with 140 of them being awarded some type of order or medal, and a further 121 dying. The village of Kizomys was liberated by Soviet troops on 14 March 1944. Due to the war, the economy was effectively destroyed, although collective farms helped revive it, including the fishing collective farm "Lenin's Path" and another named after Kirov. In 1970, a nursery-kindergarten was opened up in the village. By the late soviet period, Kizomys had an eight-year school, a library, a club, a consultation centre, a post office, and other stores.

=== In an independent Ukraine ===
Consequences of Russian shelling in Kizomys, 2023.

Following the collapse of the Soviet Union in 1991, Kizomys became part of an independent Ukraine. In June 2020, during administrative restructuring, the village became part of the Bilozerka settlement hromada. A month later, in July, after the liquidation of the Bilozerka Raion it also became part of the Kherson Raion.

==== 2022-present: Russian invasion and depopulation ====
The village was occupied soon after the start of the 2022 Russian invasion of Ukraine, after the Russians crossed over from Crimea. The village was eventually liberated during the 2022 Kherson counteroffensive, alongside the rest of right-bank Kherson Oblast. As reported by the Centre for Journalistic Investigations, the village was heavily destroyed due to the war and constant Russian shelling and was further devastated by the Destruction of the Kakhovka Dam. It was reported that fewer than a hundred people remained in the village as of mid-2023. The village was further depopulated when all the children underwent a mandatory evacuation, with families receiving free temporary housing and food to evacuate. Some of the more notable Russian shellings since 2023 have included, but are not limited to: a three-day shelling in April 2023, which destroyed multiple houses, a church, shops, and a car, using two guided aerial bombs; a shelling in August 2023 that struck a church repeatedly; and a January 2026 strike that struck a house and killed a civilian.

== Culture ==
Before the war, the city also held a number of festivals, which mainly centered around fishing. The "Kizim Jushka Fest" was held in the village and showcased Ukrainian folk traditions. A soup festival has also been held annually in August.

== Religion ==
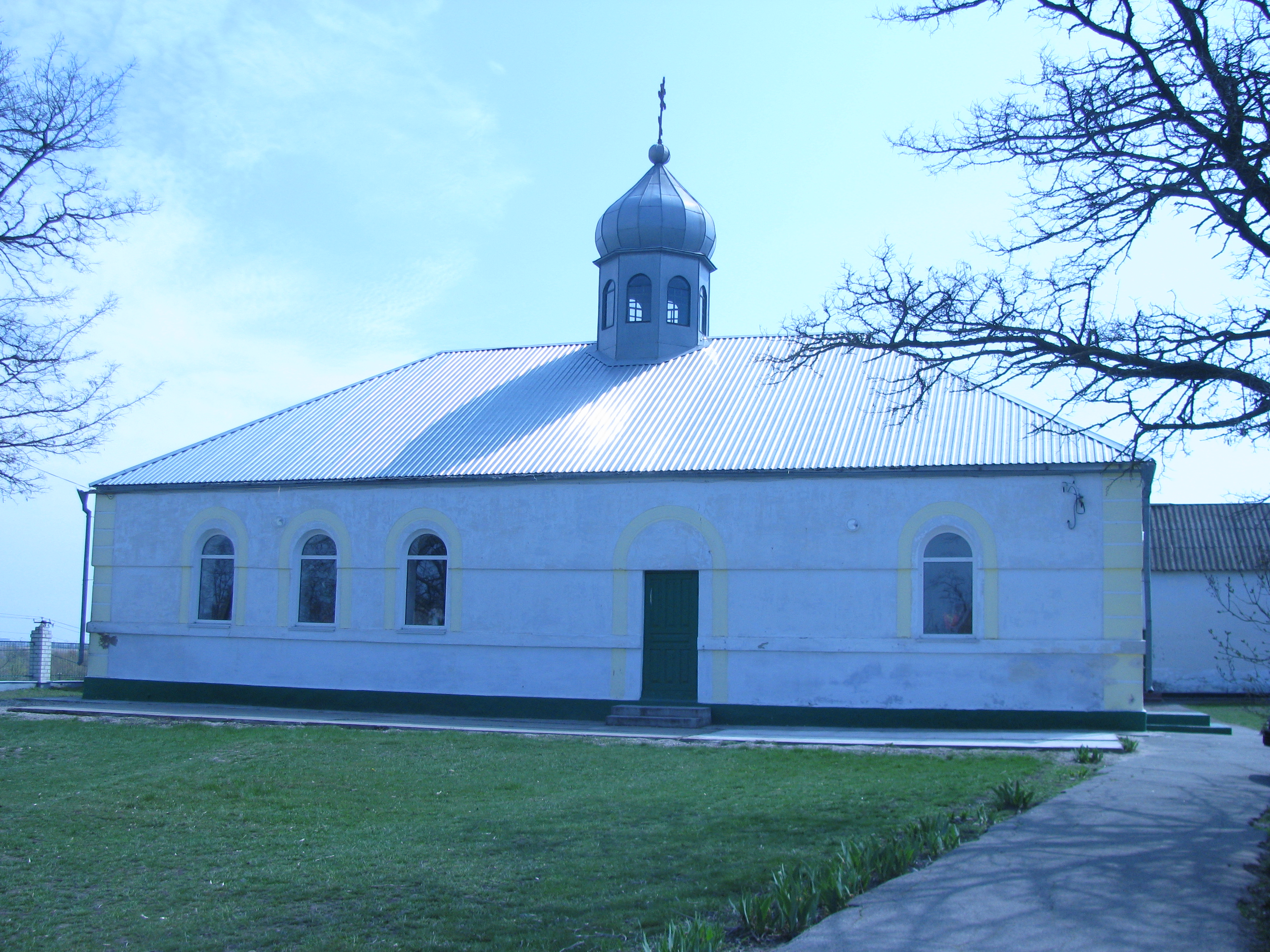
St. Nicholas Church

The main church in the village was St. Nicholas Church. It was completely destroyed in April 2023, according to the Kherson Diocese, after an aerial bombing. After part of it was rebuilt, it was again shelled in August 2023, with flames engulfing the entire premise.

=== Icon of the Mother of God of Kasperov ===
The village was formerly home to the Icon of the Mother of God of Kasperov. The icon belonged to a Serbian family who came from Transylvania to the Kherson Governorate with it. The relic was later bought in 1809 by a Kherson landowner, Nikolai Kasperov, in bad condition. His wife, Iulianna, brought it with her to the small village of Kasperovo, to her estate, which is now part of Kizomys. In February 1840, Iulianna cried and prayed to the icon, asking for help, with Kasperova then saying that the icon was renewed afterwards, with the face of the Virgin Mary becoming clearer. Later, a minor landed noblewoman, Vera Burleeva, who had been ill in her left hand, said she heard in a dream the voice of the Virgin Mary, who instructed her to go to Kasperovo to pray at the holy icon, and then received complete healing. Afterwards, multiple people came to the estate of Kasperovo, although rumours about the healings led the icon to be proposed to be transferred in 1844. Kasperova agreed, and it was transferred to Novoivanovsk, before it was then passed around the cities of the entire Black Sea region. During the Soviet era, it eventually made its way permanently to Odesa, where it is kept at the Holy Assumption Cathedral.

== Demographics ==
According to the most recent estimates done in 2023, the population of the village is fewer than a hundred people. This is down from the only official estimate done post-independence, the 2001 Ukrainian census, which found the population in Kizomys to be 1,797. This was itself only slightly down from the last Soviet census, the 1989 Soviet census, which recorded 1,862 people in the village.

=== Language ===
In Kizomys, according to the 2001 All-Ukrainian Census, the most dominant mother tongue language by far is the Ukrainian language, which was spoken by 88.81% of the population. The Russian language made up the minority at 10.30% of the population.

Languages	2001
Ukrainian	88.81%
Russian	10.30%
Other	0.89%

== Education ==
The secondary school of Kizomys.

The main 7-year school was originally opened in 1932, but stopped operating in 1941. It did not return after World War II, and was eventually reorganised into an 8-year school in 1948. Since 2005, the school principal has been Liliya Havrylivna Kryvonos. It was reported in 2025 that she had been tried in absentia in Kherson for collaboration with Russia.

== Transport ==
The closest railway station is the regional Kherson station. In 2023, a bus route was reinstalled from Kherson to Kizomys, which runs three times a day from the Kherson suburban bus station.
