= Tavriiske, Kherson Raion =

Village in Kherson Oblast, Ukraine

Tavriiske Таврійське
- Village
- Interactive map of Tavriiske
- Location of Tavriiske within Ukraine Tavriiske (Ukraine)
- Coordinates: 46.725556°N 32.1025°E
- Country: Ukraine
- Oblast: Kherson Oblast
- Raion: Kherson Raion
- Hromada: Bilozerka settlement hromada

Area
  - Total: 0.78 km^{2} (0.30 sq mi)
- Elevation: 38 m (125 ft)

Population (2001 census)
  - Total: 566
  - Density: 730/km^{2} (1,900/sq mi)
- Time zone: UTC+2 (EET)
  - Summer (DST): UTC+3 (EEST)
- Postal code: 75013
- Area code: +380 5547

Tavriiske (Ukrainian: Таврійське; Russian: Таврийское) is a village in Kherson Raion, Kherson Oblast, southern Ukraine, about 40.8 kilometres (25.4 mi) west-northwest from the centre of Kherson city. It belongs to the Bilozerka settlement hromada, one of the hromadas of Ukraine.

The village was formerly called Kirov (Ukrainian: Кірове) until 2016, when it was changed during a series of renamings by the Verkhovna Rada as part of decommunization.

== History ==
The village was informally was founded alongside Nova Zorya on scattered forms. In 1920, the land was allocated to the peasants after it was taken over by the Soviet Union, in addition to some residents from the village of nearby Stanislav who received land allotments for relocating to the village. Thus, in 1920, the modern village of then-Kirov was formed. It was later occupied by German troops during the Great Patriotic War from 17 August 1941 to 14 March 1944, before the Soviets regained power. During the war, more than 300 villagers fought against the Nazis, of whom 80 died.

In 2016, the village name was changed to Tavriiske as part of decommunization. In the village is the agricultural enterprise SVK "Druzhba" currently. The village came under attack by Russian forces in 2022, during the Russian invasion of Ukraine. The village was liberated by Ukrainian troops in June 2022. In June 2025, Russian air strikes hit the village, killing one resident.

== Demographics ==
The settlement had 566 inhabitants in 2001. The native language distribution as of the Ukrainian Census of 2001 was:

- Ukrainian: 92.05%
- Russian: 4.95%
- Armenian: 1.41%
- Moldovan (Romanian): 1.41%
