= Muzykivka rural hromada =

Coordinates: 46°47′37″N 32°34′00″E

Muzykivka rural hromada Музиківська сільська громада
- Hromada
- Interactive map of Muzykivka rural hromada
- Country: Ukraine
- Oblast: Kherson Oblast
- Raion: Kherson Raion
- Admin. center: Muzykivka

Area
  - Total: 126.8 km^{2} (49.0 sq mi)

Population
  - Total: 3,693
  - Density: 29.12/km^{2} (75.43/sq mi)
- CATOTTG code: UA65100090000097337
- Settlements: 5
- Villages: 5

Muzykivka rural hromada (Ukrainian: Музиківська сільська громада) is a hromada of Ukraine, located in Kherson Raion, Kherson Oblast. Its administrative center is the village Muzykivka.

== History ==
The hromada was established in July 2016 by the voluntary amalgamation of the Muzykivka and the Skhidnenska, both of which were then located in the Bilozerka Raion, in accordance with paragraph 2 of Article 7 of the Law of Ukraine approved by the Verkhovna Rada on voluntary amalgamation of territorial communities. The main areas emphasized after the merger were improving medicine and education, as the Muzykivska hromada previously had no doctors. With the merger, an outpatient clinic was developed along with FAPs. Also previously many went to Kherson for their education, with nearly 50% of children going to the city, but the lyceum was developed after the merger. It was also noted that there was hope for economic growth with investment in canneries.

According to interviews with residents of the hromada after the occupation by Russian forces during the Russo-Ukrainian War, locals resisted the occupation and refused to cooperate, repeatedly restoring Ukrainian flags.

== Settlements ==
It has an area of 126.8 square kilometres (49.0 mi^{2}) and a population of 3,693 people. In March 2025, the Head of the Kherson District State Administration, Mykhailo Lynetskyi, announced that there were 3,179 inhabitants within the hromada after the start of the Russo-Ukrainian War in 2022 and its brief occupation by Russian forces prior to the Kherson counteroffensive. The hromada contains five villages: Miroshnykivka, Muzykivka, Skhidne, Vysuntsi, and Zahorianivka.
