= Chornobaivka rural hromada =

Administrative unit in Kherson Oblast, Ukraine

Coordinates: 46°45′41″N 32°24′42″E

Chornobaivka rural hromada Чорнобаївська сільська
- Hromada
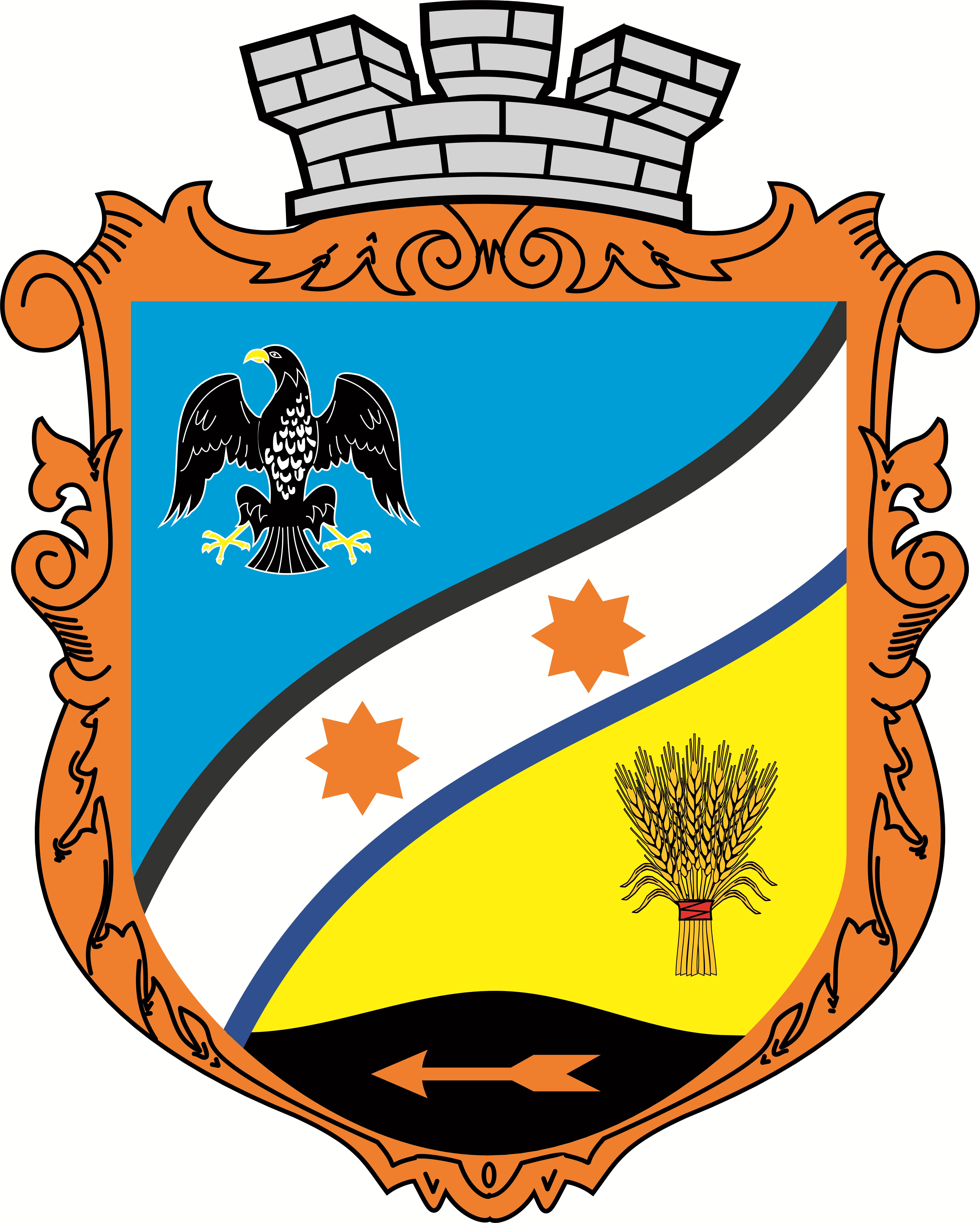
- Seal
- Interactive map of Chornobaivka rural hromada
- Country: Ukraine
- Province: Kherson Oblast
- District: Kherson Raion

Government
  - Head: Ihor Mykhailovych Dudar

Area
  - Total: 241.9 km^{2} (93.4 sq mi)

Population (2022)
  - Total: 14,777
  - Density: 61.09/km^{2} (158.2/sq mi)

Chornobaivka rural hromada (Ukrainian: Чорнобаївська сільська громада) is an hromada in Ukraine, in Kherson Raion of Kherson Oblast. Its administrative center is Chornobaivka. It was created by an edict of the Verkhovna Rada on 4 April 2018. Population: 14,777 (2022 estimate)

== Settlements ==
The hromada contains 9 villages: Barvinok, Blahodatne, Zelenyi Hai, Kyselivka, Klapaia, Krutyi Yar, Posad-Pokrovske, Soldatske, Chornobaivka (seat of the hromada), and one rural-type settlement, Kopani.

== History ==
It was created by an edict of the Verkhovna Rada on 4 April 2018. It merged together the Chornobaivka hromada (which was designated as its administrative center), Blahodatne hromada, Kyselivka hromada, and the Posad-Pokrovske hromada, all of which were then located in the Bilozerka Raion.

In July 2020, by resolution of the Verkhovna Rada 807-IX, as a result of administrative-territorial reform and the liquidation of the Bilozerka Raion, the hromada was incorporated into the Kherson Raion.

During the 2022 Russian invasion of Ukraine, the Chornobaivka rural hromada was included within the list of hromadas of Ukraine the inhabitants of which could seek support from the state due to being either under Russian military occupation or to being within fighting zone. It was the sight of hostilities by February 2022, when Russian troops attempted to first capture Chornobaivka, but eventually the hromada was recaptured by Ukrainian troops in November 2022 during the Kherson counteroffensive.
