= Nikolai Skadovsky =

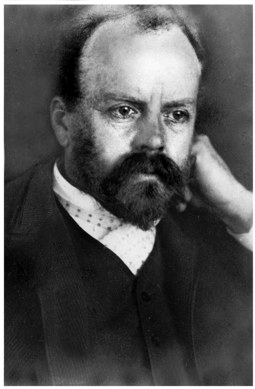
Nikolai Skadovsky (1891/2)

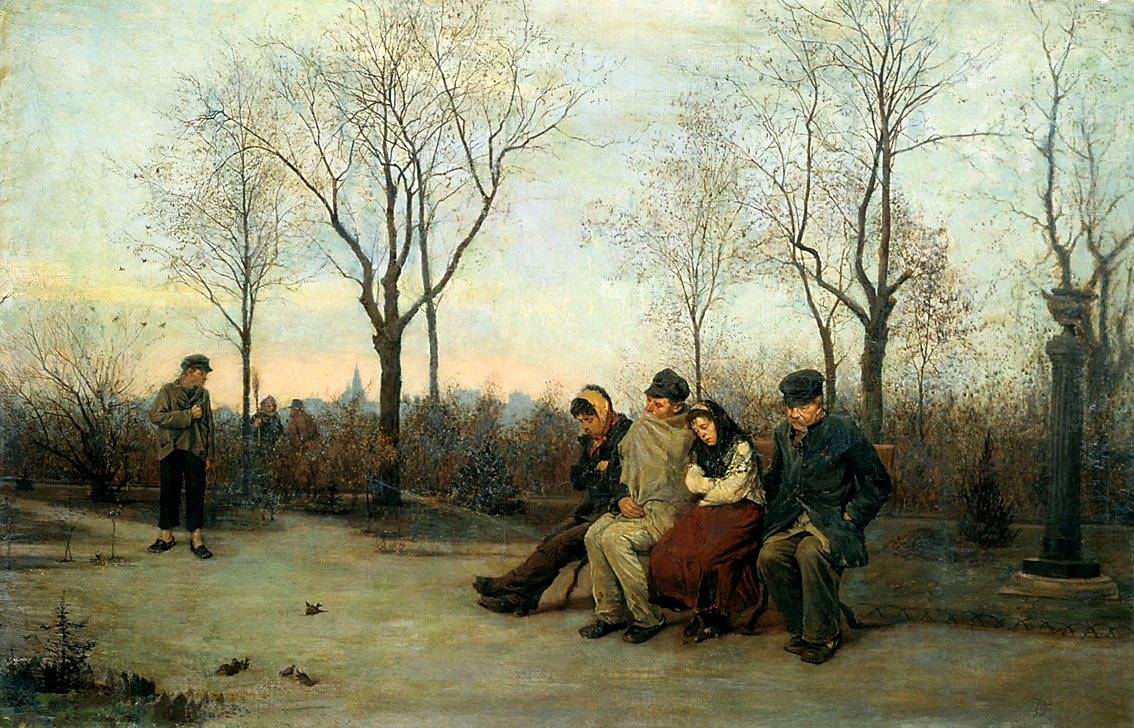
Homeless (1870s)

Nikolai Lvovich Skadovsky (Ukrainian: Микола Львович Скадовський; 16 November 1845 – 11 June 1892) was a Ukrainian painter who specialized in genre scenes.

== Biography ==
He was descended from an old family of the Polish nobility that took an oath of allegiance to the Russian Empire in the 1790s and received land near Skadovsk. Born in Bilozerka, Kherson Governorate, he spent his childhood in Odessa, where he studied at the Lycée Richelieu. In 1865, he enrolled in the Faculty of Medicine at the University of Moscow. During that time, he also audited classes at the Moscow School of Painting, Sculpture and Architecture.

He soon discovered that medicine left him little time to pursue painting, so he switched to studying law instead. In 1869, he graduated from the University and the painting school, where he received a gold medal, and decided to devote himself entirely to art. He briefly attended the Kunstakademie Düsseldorf then, being from a wealthy family, he was able to spend the next few years visiting famous art galleries throughout Europe and copying the Old Masters.

In 1876, he returned to Bilozerka and set up his own studio. His first showing came in 1879 at an exhibition of the "Imperial Society for the Appreciation of the Arts" and, two years later, participated in a private exhibition of Ukrainian painters organized by Rufin Sudkovsky. In 1882, one of his paintings was purchased by the Tretyakov Gallery.

The following year, he returned to Italy and created a series of watercolors. In 1889, he was one of the founders of the "Society of South Russian Artists". There followed a flurry of exhibitions, including an especially notable one in 1892, held to benefit the victims of a crop failure.

He died suddenly later that year in Bilozerka, following a brief illness.
