= Lyudmila Shirina =

Ukrainian operatic soprano

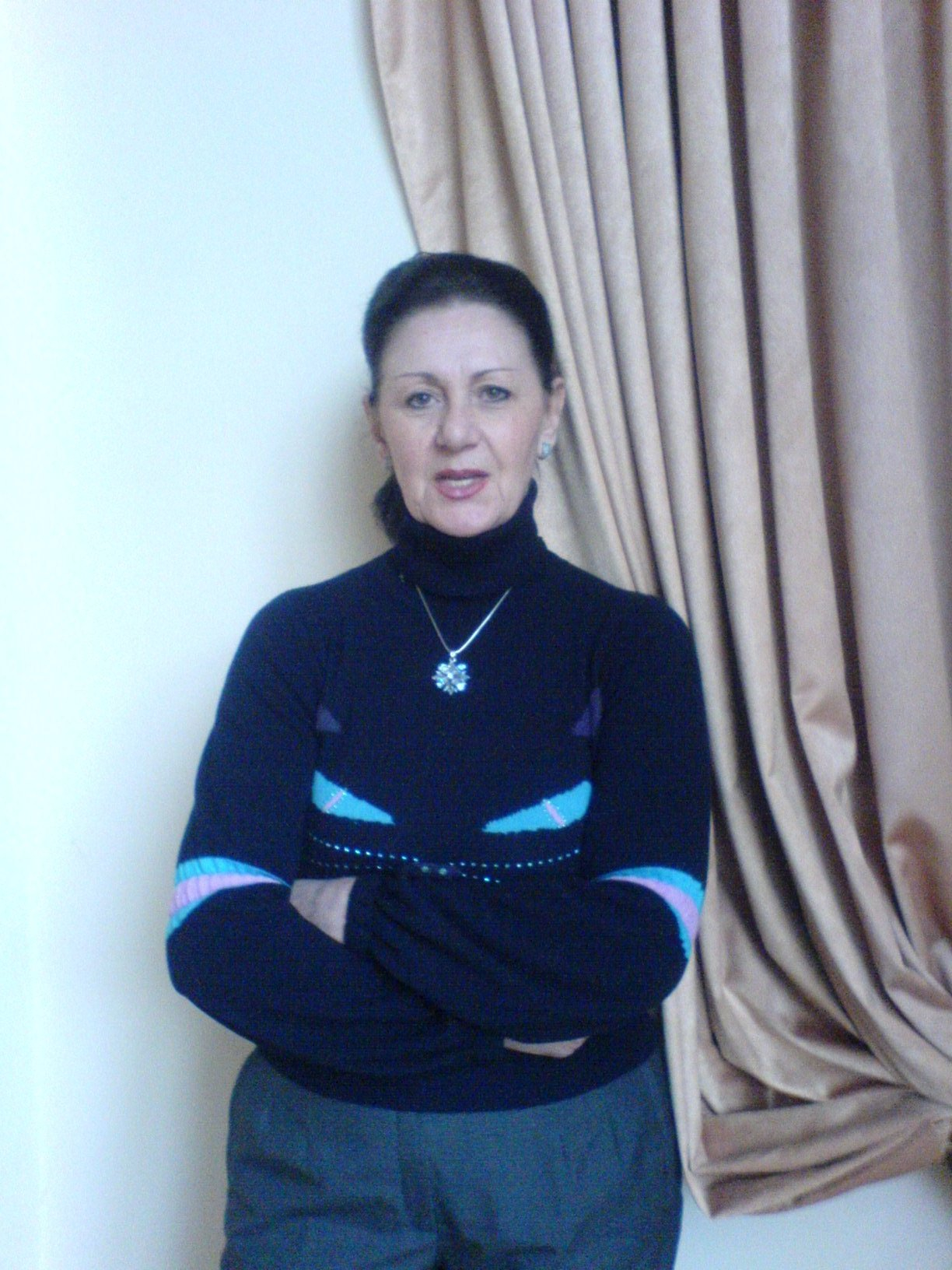
- Lyudmila Shirina in 2011
- Born: 1 August 1948; Bilozerka, Soviet Union
- Education: Odesa Conservatory
- Occupation: Operatic soprano
- Organizations: Odesa Opera and Ballet Theater
- Title: People's Artist of Ukraine

Lyudmila Shirina (Ukrainian: Людмила Ширина; born 1 August 1948, in Bilozerka, Soviet Union) is a Ukrainian operatic soprano, a member of the Odesa Opera and Ballet Theater.

== Life ==
Born in Bilozerka, Shirina played several instruments including accordion and piano. She liked gymnastics, volleyball and basketball. Shirina studied voice at the Odesa Conservatory with M. V. Golyatovskaya. She won the International Tchaikovsky Competition.

Shirina has been a member of the Odesa Opera and Ballet Theater from 1975, later also in charge of the company. She has toured in Europe to France, Belgium, Finland, Germany, Bulgaria, Hungary, Italy and Spain, and further to Canada, Japan and Afghanistan. In 1990, she took part in a recording of a gala concert "The Golden Crown" of the second International Festival of Opera at the theatre, conducted by Vasyl Vasylenko. She appeared in Odesa in the title role of Tchaikovsky's The Maid of Orleans in 1994.

In 1977, she received the Grand Prix at the International Vocal Competition in Toulouse (France). She was awarded the title People's Artist of Ukraine in 1993, and was named Chevalier of the Order of Princess Olga in 1998.

== Roles ==
Shirina's operatic roles include:

- Verdi
  - Aida – title role
  - Il trovatore – Leonora
  - Un ballo in maschera – Amelia
  - Otello – Desdemona
- Puccini
  - Tosca – title role
  - La bohème – Mimi
- Leoncavallo's Pagliacci – Nedda
- Mascagni's Cavalleria rusticana – Santuzza
- Tchaikovsky
  - The Queen of Spades – Lisa
  - The Maid of Orleans – title role
  - Eugene Onegin – Tatiana
  - Iolanta – title role
- Hulak-Artemovsky's Zaporozhets beyond the Danube – Oksana
- M. Lysenko's Natalka Poltavka – title role
- N. Arkas' Katerina – title role
- Prokofiev's Semyon Kotko – Lyubka
