= Posad-Pokrovske =

Village in Kherson Oblast, Ukraine

Posad-Pokrovske Посад-Покровське
- Village
- Interactive map of Posad-Pokrovske
- Location of Posad-Pokrovske Posad-Pokrovske (Ukraine)
- Coordinates: 46°48′19″N 32°15′46″E
- Country: Ukraine
- Oblast: Kherson Oblast
- Raion: Kherson Raion
- Hromada: Chornobaivka rural hromada
- Settlement: 1789

Area
  - Total: 4.956 km^{2} (1.914 sq mi)

Population (2001)
  - Total: 2,349
- Postal code: 75010
- Area code: +380 5547
- Climate: Cfa

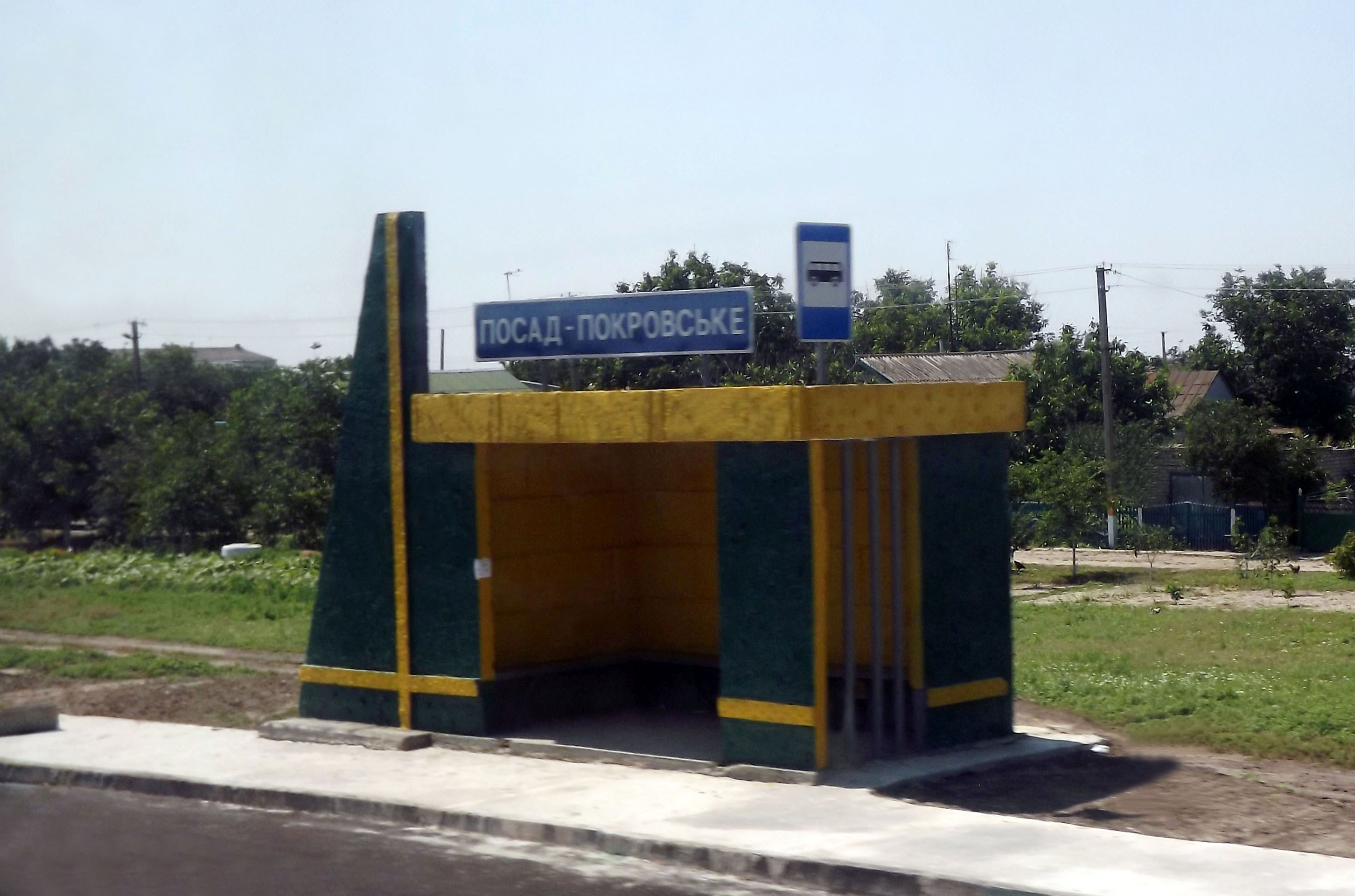
Bus stop in Posad-Pokrovske, July 2013

Posad-Pokrovske (Ukrainian: Посад-Покровське, pronounced [poˈsɑd poˈkrɔu̯sʲke]) is a village in Kherson Raion, Kherson Oblast, southern Ukraine. Alternative historical names for the village included Pokrovske and Kopani.

== Administrative status ==
Until 18 July 2020, Posad-Pokrovske was located in the Bilozerka Raion. The raion was abolished in July 2020 as part of the administrative reform of Ukraine, which reduced the number of raions of Kherson Oblast to five. The area of Bilozerka Raion was merged into Kherson Raion.

== History ==
Posad-Pokrovske was founded in 1789 as a property of the Imperial Russian Navy. In 1795, there were 19 houses with 91 inhabitants.

Posad-Pokrovske was liberated by Ukraine's 28th Mechanized Brigade in mid-March 2022. Posad-Pokrovske was a front line village until the liberation of Kherson eight months later, which led to the destruction of most of the village.

== Demographics ==
The native languages of Posad-Pokrovske as of the Ukrainian Census of 2001 were:

- Ukrainian 90.97%
- Russian 8.22%
- Moldovan (Romanian) 0.38%
- Belarusian 0.04%
- Others 0.39%
