= Bilozerka settlement hromada =

Administrative unit in Kherson Oblast, Ukraine

Coordinates: 46.633333°N 32.433333°E

Bilozerka settlement hromada Білозерська селищна громада
- Hromada
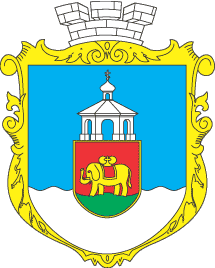
- Seal
- Interactive map of Bilozerka settlement hromada
- Country: Ukraine
- Oblast: Kherson Oblast
- Raion: Kherson Raion

Area
  - Total: 163.2 km^{2} (63.0 sq mi)

Population
  - Total: 21,681
  - Density: 132.8/km^{2} (344.1/sq mi)
- Settlements: 25
- Rural settlements: 14
- Villages: 11

The Bilozerka settlement hromada (Ukrainian: Білозерська селищна громада) is an hromada in Ukraine, in Kherson Raion of Kherson Oblast. The administrative center is Bilozerka.

== Composition ==
The area of the hromada is 407.5 square kilometres (157.3 mi^{2}), and its population is 21,926.

It contains fourteen rural settlements:

- Bilozerka
- Dniprovske
- Myrne
- Berehove
- Veletenske
- Honcharne
- Doslidne
- Myroliubivka
- Molodetske
- Pervomaiske
- Rozliv
- Romashkove
- Chereshenky
- Yantarne

And eleven villages:

- Kizomys
- Pravdyne
- Nadezhdivka
- Tomyna Balka
- Hrozove
- Znamianka
- Zorivka
- Nova Zoria
- Novodmytrivka
- Parysheve
- Tavriiske

== History ==
It was created on July 6, 2017 by Resolution no. 200. This was in accordance with the order of the Head of the Regional State Administration No. 359 of 29 May 2017, and it combined the already existing Bilozerka settlement hromada with the Tomyna Balka hromada and the Nadezhdivka hromada. The administrative was designated as Bilozerka, and its first task was to request the Central Election Commission for new elections.

Until 18 July, 2020, the hromada belonged to Bilozerka Raion. The raion was abolished in July 2020 as part of the administrative reform of Ukraine, which reduced the number of raions of Kherson Oblast to five. The area of Bilozerka Raion was merged into Kherson Raion.

During the Russo-Ukrainian War, the hromada was temporarily occupied by Russian troops. It was deoccupied by Russian troops during the Kherson counteroffensive on 11 November 2022. In May 2023, Russian forces shelled multiple places in the hromada, killing eight civilians and damaging civil infrastructure facilities like residential buildings.
