= Pravdyne =

Pravdyne Правдине
- Village
- Interactive map of Pravdyne
- Location in Ukraine Pravdyne (Ukraine)
- Coordinates: 46°44′17″N 32°12′16″E
- Country: Ukraine
- Oblast: Kherson Oblast
- Raion: Kherson Raion
- Hromada: Bilozerka settlement hromada

Population (2001)
  - Total: 1,621

Pravdyne (Ukrainian: Правдине, previously known as Tsarevodar) is a village of Ukraine in the Bilozerka settlement hromada, Kherson Raion, Kherson Oblast. In 2001, it had a population of 1,621.

== History ==
=== Founding and early history ===
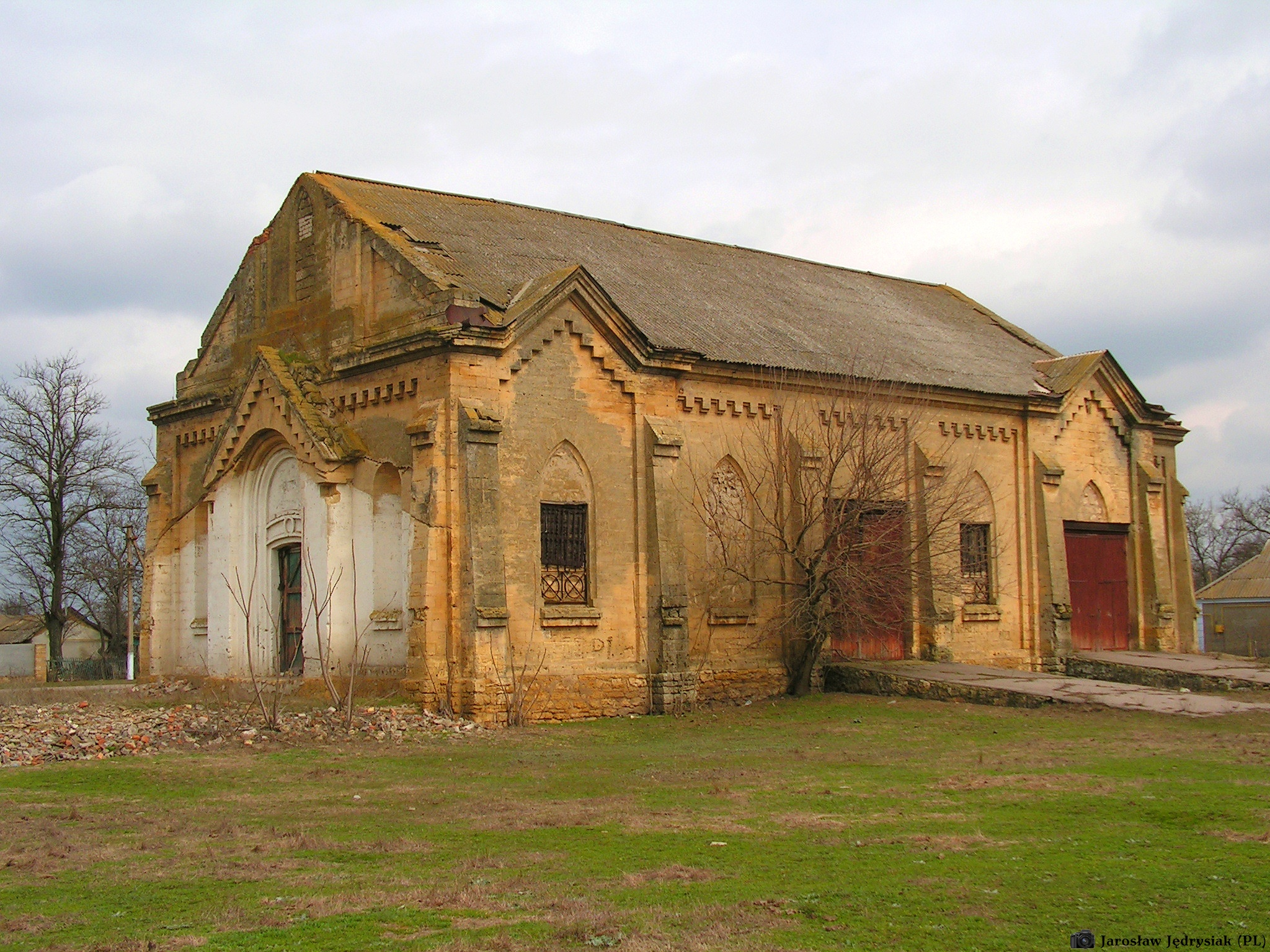
Catholic church from the nineteenth century

Originally known as Tsarevodar, the village was founded in 1846 by immigrants from the western provinces of the Russian Empire, namely those of Vilna, Grodno, and Podolia. The original name of Tsarevodar reflects the fact that the land for the village came from the state's fund, and hence the Tsar's.

As of 1886, 1,368 people lived in the village, which contained a prayer house, a school, and two shops.

=== 2022 Russian invasion of Ukraine ===
The city was occupied by the Russian armed forces following the Battle of Kherson in early 2022. During the 2022 Ukrainian southern counteroffensive, the Armed Forces of Ukraine liberated the town.

== Demographics ==
According to the 1989 Soviet census, the village had a population of 1,811, of whom 923 were men and 888 women.

According to the 2001 Ukrainian census, the village had a population of 1,621.

=== Languages ===
The native languages of the village's inhabitants, according to the 2001 Ukrainian census, were:

Language	%
Ukrainian	94.84 %
Russian	4.54 %
Moldovan (Romanian)	0.43 %
Belarusian	0.06 %
