= Soldatske, Kherson Oblast =

Village in Donetsk Oblast, Ukraine

Soldatske Солдатське
- Village
- Interactive map of Soldatske
- Location of Soldatske within Ukraine Soldatske (Ukraine)
- Coordinates: 46.7615°N 32.4117°E
- Country: Ukraine
- Oblast: Kherson Oblast
- Raion: Kherson Raion
- Hromada: Chornobaivka rural hromada

Area
  - Total: 0.364 km^{2} (0.141 sq mi)
- Elevation: 41 m (135 ft)

Population (2001 census)
  - Total: 139
  - Density: 382/km^{2} (989/sq mi)
- Time zone: UTC+2 (EET)
  - Summer (DST): UTC+3 (EEST)
- Postal code: 75014
- Area code: +380 5547

Soldatske (Ukrainian: Солдатське; Russian: Солдатское) is a village in Kherson Raion (district) in Kherson Oblast of southern Ukraine, at about 35.6 kilometres (22.1 mi) north-west from the centre of Kherson city. It belongs to Chornobaivka rural hromada, one of the hromadas of Ukraine.

== History ==
The village came under attack by Russian forces in 2022, during the Russian invasion of Ukraine. In August 2022 it was reported that the South Operational Command had carried out strikes on the Russian stronghold in Soldatske when it was under occupation. The village was regained by Ukrainian forces by October the same year

== Politics ==
In the 2014 Ukrainian parliamentary election, the polling station for Soldatske most frequently voted for Petro Poroshenko's Bloc, which was at the time a pro-European party led by Vitali Klitschko. Smaller shares of the ballet went to the Batkivshchyna, which was led by former Prime Minister Yulia Tymoshenko, and the pro-Russian political party Opposition Bloc.

== Demographics ==
According to the 2001 Ukrainian Census, the only official census taken in post-independence Ukraine, the population of the village was 139 people. Of the people residing in the village, their mother tongue is as follows:

Language	Percentage of Population
Ukrainian	92.81%%
Russian	6.47%%
Romanian	0.72%

Previously, according the 1989 Soviet Census, the population of the village was 155 people, of which 75 were men and 80 were women.
