= National Book of Remembrance of the Victims of the Holodomor of 1932-1933 in Ukraine =

National Book of Memory of the Victims of the Holodomor 1932–1933 in Ukraine is one of the most significant outcomes of efforts to research the Holodomor and honor the memory of its victims on the occasion of the 75th anniversary of the tragedy. It was published in 2008 under the commission of the Ukrainian Institute of National Memory (UINM).

The National Book of Memory consists of a national volume and 18 regional volumes, prepared in the regions affected by the Holodomor: Vinnytsia, Dnipropetrovsk, Donetsk, Zhytomyr, Zaporizhzhia, Kyiv, Kirovohrad, Luhansk, Odesa, Poltava, Sumy, Kharkiv, Kherson, Cherkasy, Chernihiv oblasts, and the city of Kyiv. The volumes were compiled by regional and Kyiv city state administrations under the guidance of the UINM.

The UINM continues its work on creating an electronic Holodomor map, incorporating data from the volumes of the National Book of Memory.

== National Volume ==
The national volume of the National Book of Memory was prepared by the UINM with contributions from leading Holodomor researchers. It includes the following sections:

- Analytical section "How It Happened", which analyzes the historical and legal aspects of the Holodomor based on a comprehensive set of documents, providing evidence of its deliberate nature and criminal essence as a genocide of the Ukrainian people. This section is supplemented by subsections "Eyewitness Testimonies" and "Documents," presenting specific evidence of the Holodomor's criminal nature.
- Section "Territory of the Holodomor", which details the geographic scope of the Holodomor, demonstrating that all regions of the Ukrainian SSR were affected. It includes a list of approximately 13,500 identified settlements impacted by the Holodomor, compiled from archival documents and witness interviews provided by regional state administrations.
- Register of Documents related to the Holodomor, indicating archives and online resources where these documents can be accessed.
- "Chronicle" of the Holodomor, providing a day-by-day account of events from autumn 1932 to summer 1933 in Ukraine.
- Selected Bibliography covering the most significant works dedicated to the Holodomor.
- Section "Photographic Documents", containing 140 contemporary photographs.

The volume concludes with personal and geographic indexes.

== Regional Volumes ==
The 18 regional volumes of the National Book of Memory follow a structure that includes an introductory article providing a historical overview of the Holodomor in the region, and sections titled "Martyrology," "Documents," and "Testimonies."

These volumes document over 13,000 affected settlements and list the names of 882,510 Ukrainians who perished from starvation in 1932–1933.

In Donetsk, Odesa, Kharkiv, Khmelnytskyi, and Cherkasy oblasts, the volumes are divided into multiple parts. Khmelnytskyi and Cherkasy oblasts published both planned parts, while Donetsk, Odesa, and Kharkiv oblasts published their first parts in 2008. The total volume of the published books exceeds 22,000 pages.

== See also ==
- Holodomor in Ukraine 1932–1933
- National Museum "Holodomor Victims Memorial"
