= Stanislav, Kherson Oblast =

Stanislav Станіслав
- Village
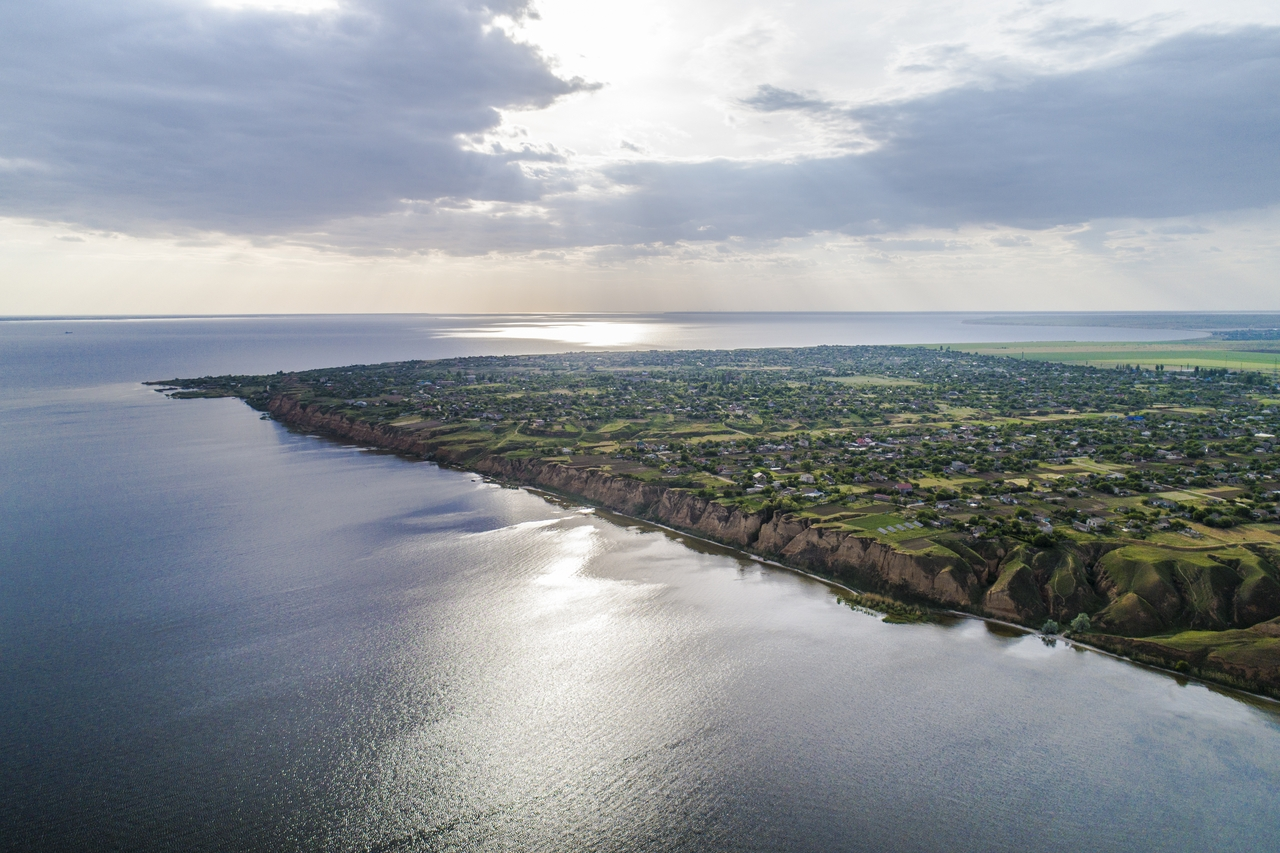
- View of Stanislav from the Black Sea

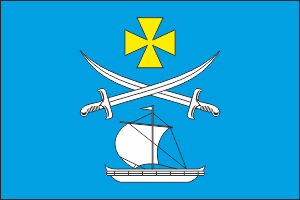
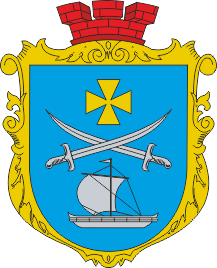
- Flag Seal

- Location in Ukraine Stanislav (Kherson Oblast)
- Coordinates: 46°34′13″N 32°8′51″E
- Country: Ukraine
- Oblast: Kherson Oblast
- Raion: Kherson Raion
- Hromada: Stanislav rural hromada

Population
  - Total: 4,724

Stanislav (Ukrainian: Станіслав) is a village in Kherson Raion western Kherson Oblast, Ukraine, with a population of around 4,724 inhabitants. It hosts the administration of Stanislav rural hromada, one of the hromadas of Ukraine.

== Geography ==
The village is located on the right bank of the Dnieper–Bug estuary.

== History ==
During the Ukrainian War of Independence, from 1917 to 1920, it passed between various factions. Afterwards it was administratively part of the Mykolaiv Governorate of Ukraine.

Until 18 July 2020, Stanislav belonged to Bilozerka Raion. The raion was abolished in July 2020 as part of the administrative reform of Ukraine, which reduced the number of raions of Kherson Oblast to five. The area of Bilozerka Raion was merged into Kherson Raion.

Stanislav came under Russian occupation during the Russian invasion of Ukraine. On November 10, during the 2022 Kherson counteroffensive, Ukrainian forces liberated the town.

Due to its location on the coast of the Dnieper–Bug estuary, Stanislav remains a front line settlement, and has been subjected to Russian shelling.

== Demographics ==
As of the 2001 Ukrainian census, Stanislav had a population of 4,941 inhabitants. The linguistic composition of the settlement was as follows:

Native languages in Stanislav
	percent
Ukrainian	88.2%
Russian	9.8%
Belarusian	0.7%
Romanian	0.4%
Armenian	0.4%
Hungarian	0.2%
others	0.2%
