= Bilozerka =

Rural locality in Kherson Oblast, Ukraine

Bilozerka Білозерка
- Rural settlement
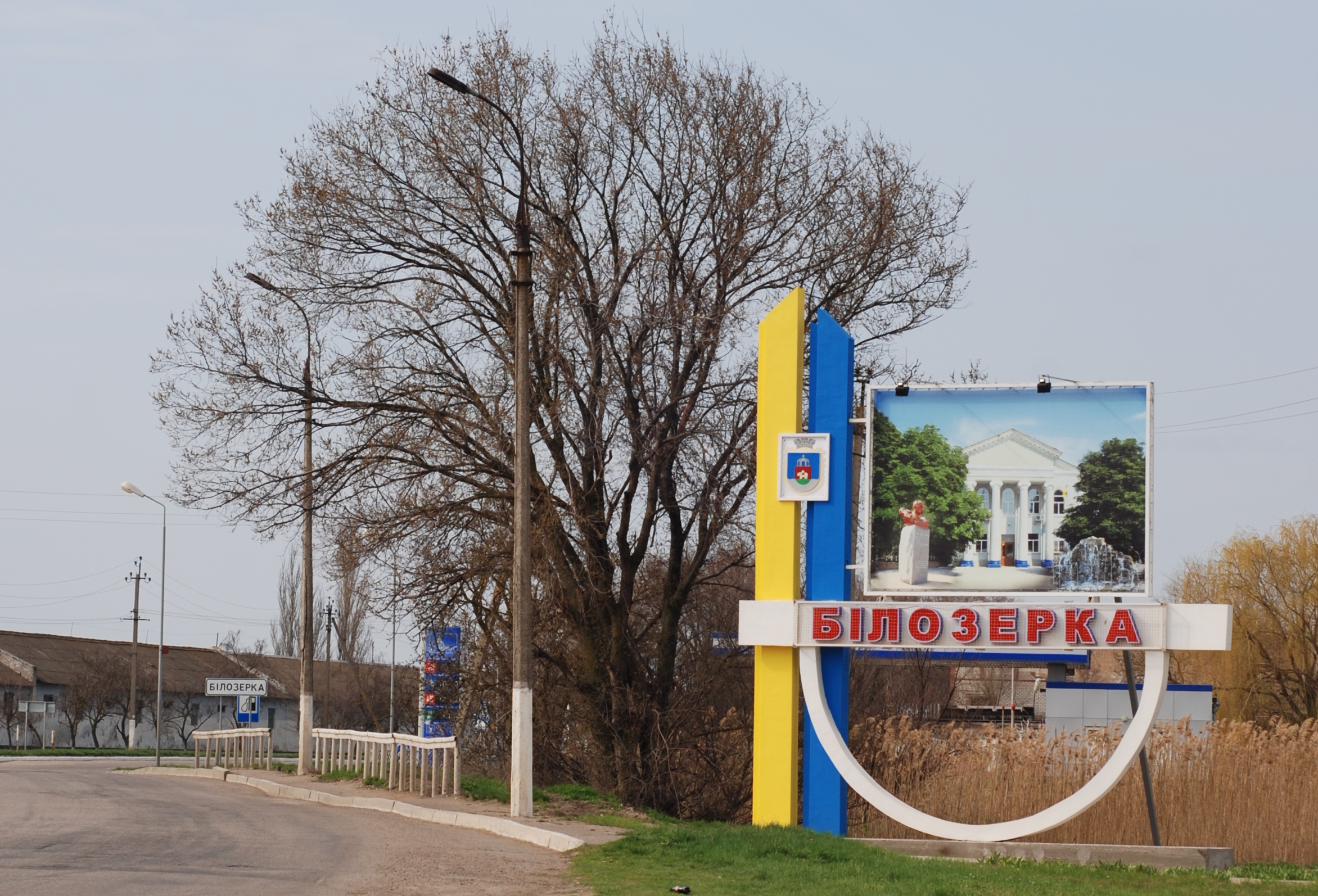

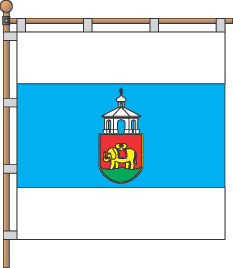
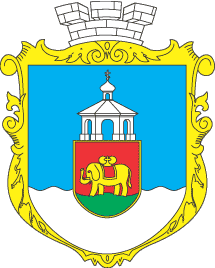
- Flag Coat of arms
- Interactive map of Bilozerka
- Location in Ukraine Bilozerka (Ukraine)
- Coordinates: 46°37′40″N 32°26′35″E
- Country: Ukraine
- Oblast: Kherson Oblast
- Raion: Kherson Raion
- Hromada: Bilozerka settlement hromada
- Founded: 1780

Area
  - Total: 6.86 km^{2} (2.65 sq mi)

Population (29.12.2022)
  - Total: ▼6,700
- Postal code: 75000
- Area code: +380-5547

Bilozerka (Ukrainian: Білозерка, pronounced [biloˈzɛrkɐ]) is a rural settlement in Kherson Raion, Kherson Oblast, southern Ukraine. It hosts the administration of Bilozerka settlement hromada, one of the hromadas of Ukraine. It has a population of 9,258 (2022 estimate).

The town's name is derived from the adjacent "White Lake," called Bile ozero (Біле озеро) in Ukrainian. Described as a "fishing-and-farming community," its residents are primarily engaged in agriculture, cattle husbandry, and the cultivation of seeds, gardens, and vineyards.

== History ==
=== Ancient history ===
In antiquity, the area was settled by Greek colonists as part of the territory of Pontic Olbia. Archeological excavations in the 19th century discovered Scythian and Sarmatian burial mounds along with artifacts from the Copper and Bronze Ages.

=== Founding ===
Bilozerka has its origins in 1780 in the Russian Empire, as the estate of Lieutenant General Ivan Gannibal, a Russian military officer who is considered one of the founders of Kherson. The first settlers in what is now Bilozerka were Zaporozhian Cossacks, from nearby camps, but the bulk of the population would come from migrants from right-bank Ukraine. Early names for the settlement included Ivanivka and Ivanivska Bilozerka after Gannibal's given name. The land was purchased in 1798 by the locally prominent Skadovsky family and became known as Skadovka, though it was still known as "Bilozerka" (and its variations) on official documents. By the end of the 18th century, Bilozerka had a population of 205 residents, 126 of whom were men and 79 were women.

=== 20th century and early 21st century ===
During the Russian Civil War, a Soviet revolutionary committee was established in Bilozerka in January 1918, but in April 1918, it was occupied by Central Powers troops during Operation Faustschlag. Starting in January 1919, it was occupied by the Allied Powers during the Southern Russia intervention, until March, when it was captured by the Bolsheviks's Red Army. In August 1919, Anton Denikin's Volunteer Army took control of the area, which they held until January 1920, when the Red Army captured it again. The Bolsheviks established the communist Soviet Union on much of the former territory of the Russian Empire. In 1939, Bilozerka was designated as the administrative center of the newly created Bilozerka Raion.

During World War II, the Wehrmacht occupied Bilozerka on 17 August 1941. The Nazis killed thirteen residents and deported forty to Germany for forced labor. The 295th Rifle Division of the Red Army eventually liberated Bilozerka on 14 March 1944. In the post-war period, Bilozerka continued to grow, and was designated an urban-type settlement in 1965.

On 18 July 2020, Bilozerka Raion was abolished as part of the administrative reform of Ukraine, which reduced the number of raions of Kherson Oblast to five. The area of Bilozerka Raion was merged into Kherson Raion.

=== Russian invasion of Ukraine ===
At the onset of the full-scale Russian invasion of Ukraine, despite nearby engagements in Kherson and Chornobaivka, the Russian military had yet to enter Bilozerka in early March 2022. The 194th Bilozerka Battalion, a territorial defense detachment primarily composed of residents of Bilozerka and the former Bilozerka Raion, participated in the battle of Kherson, where it suffered heavy casualties and consequently ceased to exist as military unit.

Russian columns first appeared in Bilozerka during the first week of March, moving westward through the village to participate in the battle of Mykolaiv. Rosgvardiya troops and FSB and OMON agents took up positions within the town, and Donbass militiamen and "Asian and Caucasian minorities" were also present among the Russian forces in Bilozerka. Supermarkets, banks, and post offices were closed for the duration of the occupation. In the center of the town, a Russian flag replaced the Ukrainian flag atop an SU-100 tank monument commemorating the Great Patriotic War.

On 14 March 2022, the anniversary of the town's liberation by the Red Army during World War II, hundreds of people participated in a protest in Bilozerka carrying Ukrainian flags, singing the Ukrainian anthem, and chanting slogans such as "Glory to Ukraine" and "Putin khuilo!". The protesters approached a group of Russian soldiers, calling them "ruscists" and telling them to "go home." The soldiers fired into the air in an attempt to disperse the crowd.

A Victory Day was parade was celebrated in Bilozerka by Russian troops and some civilians alike, but by the summer, relations between the garrison and the locals had taken a turn for the worse, with home raids, interrogations, and beatings increasing in frequency. People allegedly involved in pro-Ukrainian resistance activities were detained and tortured in ad hoc jails in the basements of a school and the courthouse.

As Russian command prepared to withdraw from the right bank of the Dnieper during Ukraine's 2022 Kherson counteroffensive, the Russian presence in Bilozerka was gradually reduced throughout October and early November, with the last Russians leaving on 11 November. Ukrainian troops entered on the same day, causing celebrations in the streets.

In March 2023, the population of Bilozerka was half of its pre-war population.

The Ukrainian military remained stationed in and around the town into 2023, as the nearby Dnieper River had become a front line during the Dnieper campaign. Bilozerka was impacted by the destruction of the Kakhovka Dam in June 2023, with streets adjacent to the lake being flooded.

Until 26 January 2024, Bilozerka was designated urban-type settlement. On this day, a new law entered into force which abolished this status, and Bilozerka became a rural settlement.

== Demographics ==
Population history

Year	Pop.	±% p.a.
1887	1,183	—
1894	1,284	+1.18%
1907	1,761	+2.46%
1916	1,947	+1.12%
1955	3,631	+1.61%

Year	Pop.	±% p.a.
1956	5,168	+42.33%
1971	6,200	+1.22%
2001	9,709	+1.51%
2022	9,258	−0.23%

As of the 2001 Ukrainian census, Bilozerka had a population of 9,709 people, most of whom were Ukrainians. The native language composition was as follows:

Native languages in Bilozerka
	percent
Ukrainian	88.5%
Russian	10.3%
Moldovan	0.3%
Romani	0.3%
Belarusian	0.2%
Armenian	0.2%
others	0.2%

== Notable people ==
- Sergei Bondarchuk, Soviet and Russian actor, film director, and screenwriter
- Nikolai Skadovsky, Ukrainian painter
- Olga Skorokhodova, Soviet scientist, therapist, teacher and writer
- Lyudmila Shirina, Ukrainian operatic soprano, a member of the Odessa Opera and Ballet Theater
