= Olga Skorokhodova =

Russian writer and research fellow (1911–1982)

Olga Ivanovna Skorokhodova (Russian: Ольга Ивановна Скороходова; 24 May [O.S. 11 May] 1911 – 7 May 1982) was a Soviet scientist, therapist, teacher and writer. She lost her vision and hearing at age five due to meningitis, and worked in the Institute for the Handicapped for the USSR Academy of Pedagogical Sciences as the world's only deafblind researcher. Skorokhodova created a number of scientific works concerning the development of education and teaching of deafblind children.

== Biography ==
Some sources indicated incorrect information about Skorokhodova's date of birth: it was sometimes referred to 1912 or 1914. However, according to the extracts from Church records, which were found after her death, she was born in 1911 (Julian calendar).

Skorokhodova was born in Bilozerka, Kherson Oblast (current-day Ukraine) in a poor peasant family. Her father was mobilized for war in 1914 and never returned, and her mother was forced to work as a housemaid for a priest. Olga began to lose her hearing when she was five years old as a result of meningitis. In 1922 after her mother's death, she was sent to a school for the blind in Odesa.

In 1925, almost completely mute, Olga came to the School-Clinic for Deafblind children in Kharkiv, founded by professor Ivan Sokolyansky. Under his care Olga recovered speech, and she began to keep notes on self-observation. In 1947 she published her book "How I perceive the world", which aroused a great interest in the speech. This literary work was awarded the K. D. Ushynsky prize. In 1954, the book was supplemented with a second part, published under the title "How I perceive and represent the world"; in 1972 a third part was published under the title "How I perceive, imagine and understand the surrounding world". In 1948 Skorokhodova became a research fellow (later senior fellow), at the Institute for the Handicapped for the Academy of Educational Sciences of the USSR. There Olga worked until the end of her life.

In 2016, Google honored her with a special logo on its Russian homepage. In 2017, a Google Doodle honored her on International Women's Day.
