= Muzykivka =

Village in Kherson Oblast, Ukraine

Muzykivka Музиківка
- Village
- Location within Kherson Oblast Location within Ukraine
- Coordinates: 46°45′4.0″N 32°33′44.5″E
- Country: Ukraine
- Oblast: Kherson Oblast
- Raion: Kherson Raion
- Hromada: Muzykivka rural hromada
- First mentioned: 1815

Area
  - Total: 5.6 km^{2} (2.2 sq mi)
- Elevation: 27 m (89 ft)

Population (2001)
  - Total: 2,672
  - Density: 480/km^{2} (1,200/sq mi)
- Time zone: UTC+2 (EET)
  - Summer (DST): UTC+3 (EEST)
- Postal Code: 75023

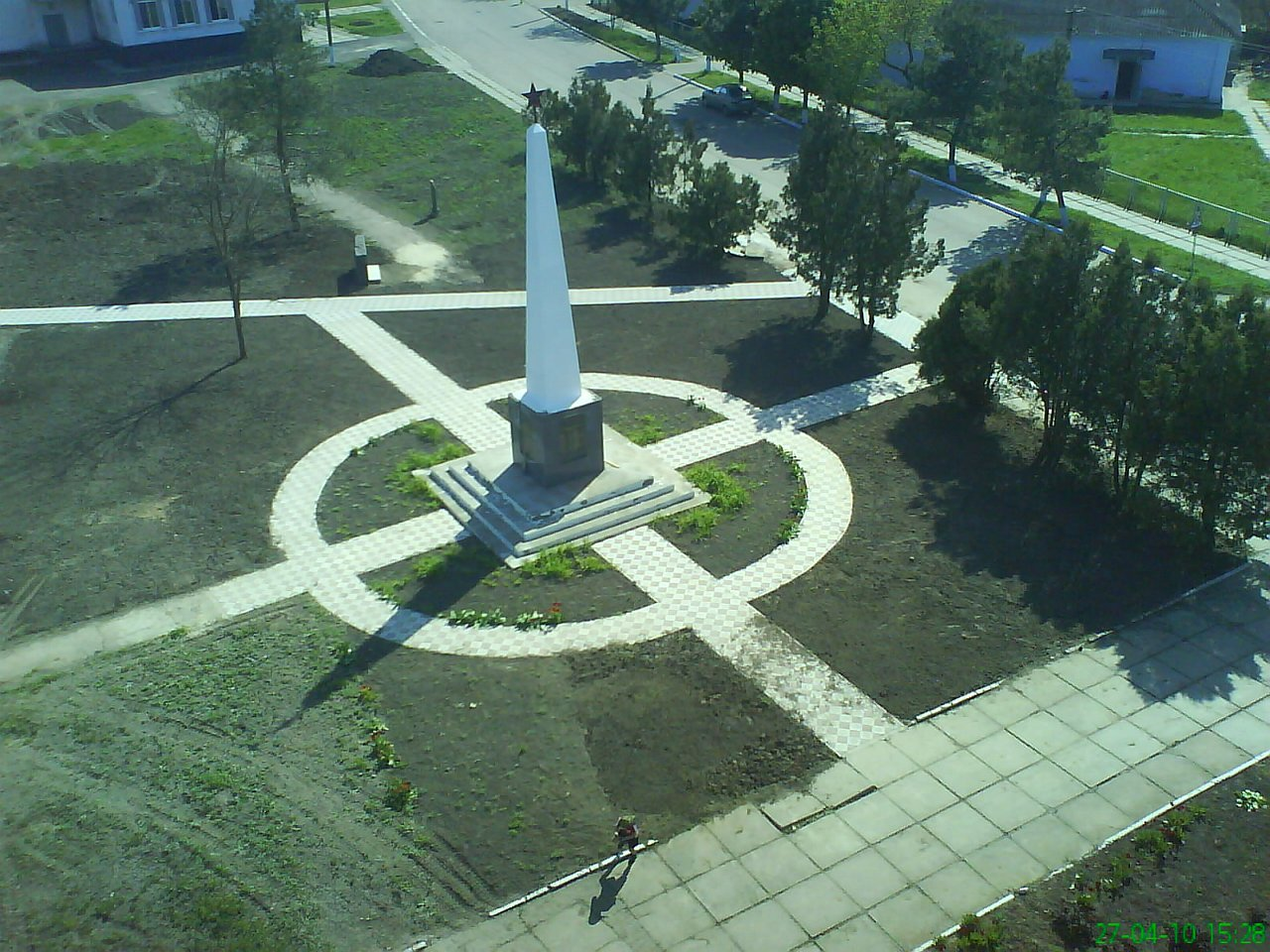

Muzykivka (Ukrainian: Музиківка) is a large village located in Kherson Raion north of the city of Kherson, Kherson Oblast. It hosts the administration of Muzykivka rural hromada, one of the hromadas of Ukraine.

== Geography ==
The village is situated 13 km from the centre of Kherson city. It has an area of 5.6 km^{2} and a population of approximately 2,672 people.

== History ==
Muzykivka is first mentioned in written sources in 1815 as "Muzykyni khutory" (Ukrainian: Музикині хутори, literally "Muzyky's khutir"). According to local tradition, "Muzyky" was the surname of a Cossack who founded the settlement.

In the times of the Soviet Union, Muzykivka was assigned to Bilozerka Raion of Kherson Oblast. During World War II, Muzykivka was occupied by Nazi Germany between 18 August 1941 and 14 March 1944.

In 2008, the settlements Vysuntsi and Miroshnykivka, which were previously administratively subordinated to Muzykivka, were split off to become independent settlements. Bilozerka Raion was abolished in July 2020 as a result of the administrative reform of Ukraine's districts, which reduced the number of raions of Kherson Oblast to five, merging Bilozerka Raion's territory, including Muzykivka, into Kherson Raion.

When Russia invaded Ukraine, Muzykivka along with much of the rest of Kherson Oblast quickly fell under Russian occupation. It was occupied from this date until 11 November 2022, when Ukrainian forces liberated Muzykivka as part of the 2022 Kherson counteroffensive.

== Demographics ==
As of the 2001 Ukrainian census, Muzykivka had a population of 2,672 people, predominantly Ukrainians.
