= Blahodatne, Kherson Raion, Kherson Oblast =

Blahodatne Благодатне
- Village
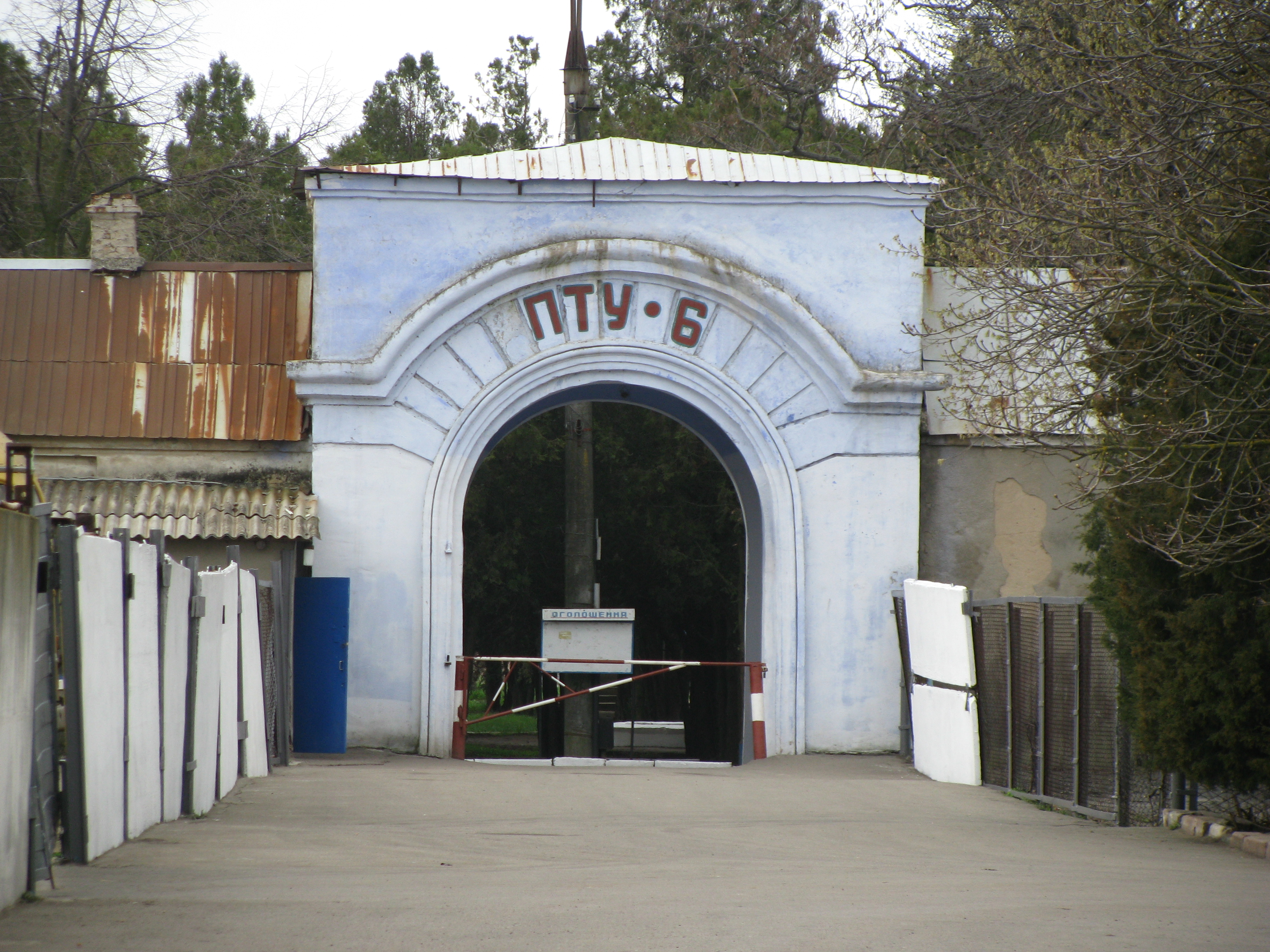
- Technical Vocational School No. 6
- Interactive map of Blahodatne
- Location of Blahodatne within Ukraine Blahodatne (Ukraine)
- Coordinates: 46.789722°N 32.345556°E
- Country: Ukraine
- Oblast: Kherson Oblast
- District: Kherson Raion
- Hromada: Chornobaivka rural hromada
- Founded: 1920

Area
  - Total: 1.054 km^{2} (0.407 sq mi)
- Elevation: 42 m (138 ft)

Population (2001 census)
  - Total: 1,008
  - Density: 956.4/km^{2} (2,477/sq mi)
- Time zone: UTC+2 (EET)
  - Summer (DST): UTC+3 (EEST)
- Postal code: 75011
- Area code: +380 5547

Blahodatne (Ukrainian: Благодатне; Russian: Благодатное), known as Petrivske (Ukrainian: Петрівське; Russian: Петровское) until 2016, is a village in Kherson Raion, Kherson Oblast, southern Ukraine, about 32 kilometres (20 mi) north-west from the centre of Kherson city.

== History ==
In 2016 the village was renamed under the Ukrainian decommunization laws, which changed placenames as part of decommunization after the Soviet Union. It was affected during Resolution No. 1377-VII of the Verkhovna Rada on 12 May 2016.

The village came under attack by Russian forces in May 2022, during the Russian invasion of Ukraine. The Russian troops were driven back by Ukrainian forces on 8 June 2022. In August, Russian troops again entered the outskirts of Blahodatne, but were soon under contest.

On 5 September the Russian Armed Forces recaptured the village. 100 Russian troops had held the village during the occupation. According to villagers, multiple people were kidnapped due to being nationalistic during the occupation, and at least one person was shot dead. On 10 November, Ukrainian troops regained full control over the village. However, the village faced significant damage due to shelling, and many infanstructure was still uninhabitable.

== Demographics ==
The settlement had 1008 inhabitants in 2001. In 2022, prior to the offenses, the village had a population of 853. At the beginning of January 2023, after the fighting between the Russian and Ukrainian forces, a large majority of the village relocated due to the war, and the population dwindled to 203. A year later, many villagers returned to the settlement to bringing the population to 503. The native language distribution according to the 2001 Ukrainian Census was:

- Ukrainian: 91.89%
- Russian: 7.43%
- Moldovan (Romanian): 0.20%
- Belarusian: 0.10%
- Other languages: 0.38%
