= Kyselivka, Kherson Oblast =

Village in Bilozerka Raion, Ukraine

Kyselivka Киселівка
- Village
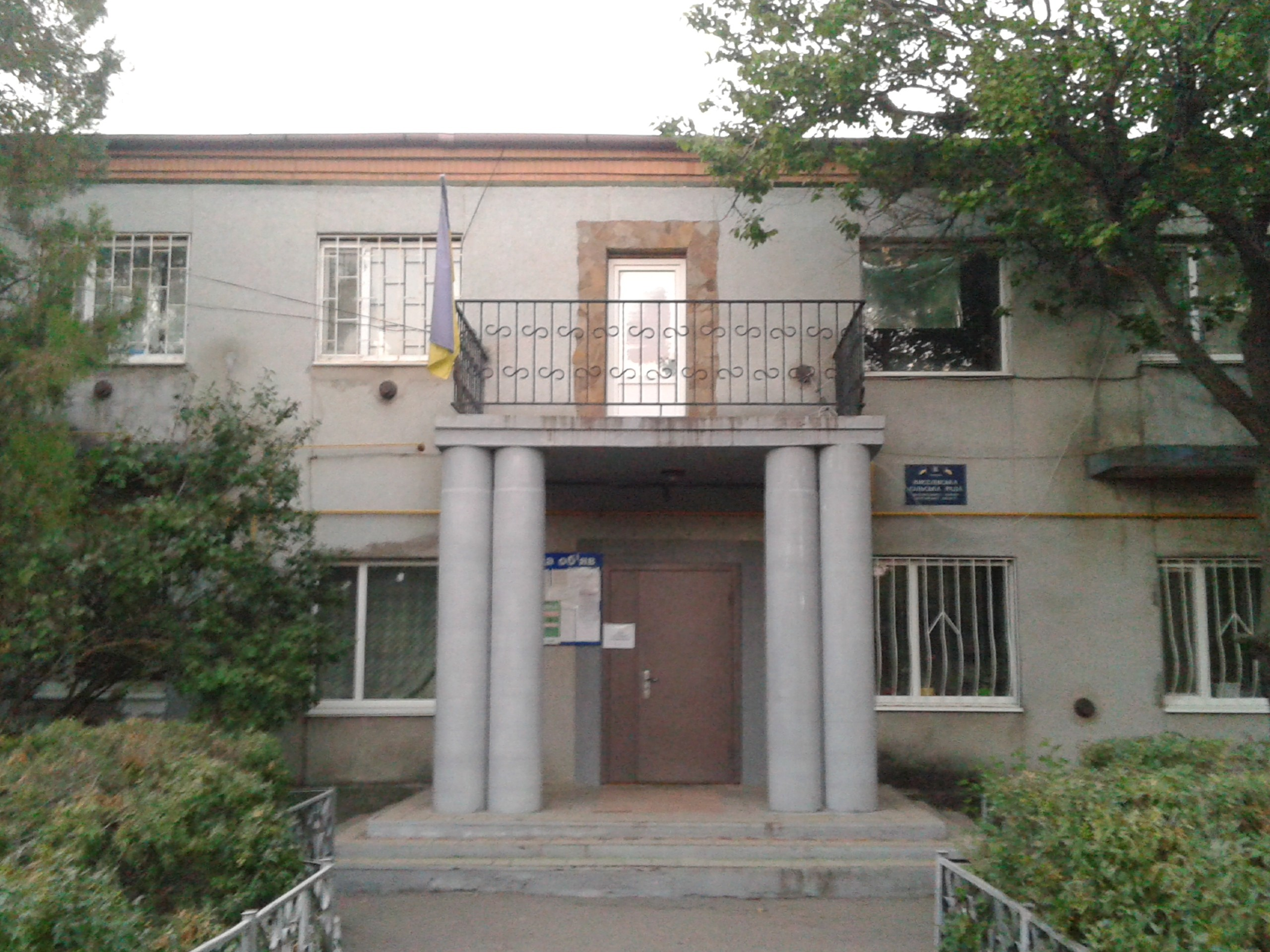
- The village council in Kyselivka, pictured in 2020
- Interactive map of Kyselivka
- Kyselivka in the Kherson Oblast Kyselivka (Ukraine)
- Coordinates: 46°45′13″N 32°24′32″E
- Country: Ukraine
- Oblast: Kherson Oblast
- Raion: Kherson Raion
- Hromada: Chornobaivka rural hromada
- Elevation: 36 m (118 ft)

Kyselivka (Ukrainian: Киселівка, pronounced [kɪseˈl⁽ʲ⁾iu̯kɐ]) is a village (selo) of Ukraine, in Chornobaivka rural hromada, Kherson Raion, Kherson Oblast.

== History ==
The village was affected by the Holodomor, in which an estimated 24 inhabitants of the village died. Due to resistance to collectivization, criminal cases were opened against many villagers.

=== 2022 Russian invasion of Ukraine ===
Following the 2022 Russian invasion of Ukraine, the village came under Russian occupation. According to the Ukrainian army, on the night of 29 April 2022, a firefight took place between ethnic Chechen and Buryat soldiers in the Russian army. There were allegedly more than 50 participants on each side.

The reason for the conflict was purportedly reluctance from the Buryats to conduct offensive hostilities, as well as resentment of perceived "inequality" in conditions with the Chechens. The Chechens were involved in the safe job of keeping the back line, and also allegedly taking a disproportionate share of the loot.

On 10 November 2022, it was reported that Ukrainian forces had retaken the village during the 2022 Kherson counteroffensive.

== Demographics ==
In the 1989 Soviet census, the village was found to have 2,533 inhabitants, of whom 1,199 were men and 1,334 women.

According to the 2001 Ukrainian census, the village had 2,466 inhabitants.

=== Languages ===
The languages of the village's inhabitants were:

Language	%
Ukrainian	94.75 %
Russian	4.33 %
Moldovan (Romanian)	0.68 %
Belarusian	0.12 %
