= Barvinok, Kherson Oblast =

Barvinok Барвінок
- Village
- Interactive map of Barvinok
- Location within Kherson Oblast Location within Ukraine
- Coordinates: 46°48′37″N 32°27′10″E
- Country: Ukraine
- Oblast: Kherson Oblast
- Raion: Kherson Raion
- Hromada: Chornobaivka rural hromada

Population (2001)
  - Total: 127

Barvinok is a village in Ukraine, located inside the Chornobaivka rural hromada, Kherson Raion, Kherson Oblast. The village is currently under Russian occupation as a result of the 2022 Russian invasion of Ukraine.

== Demographics ==
According to the 1989 U.S.S.R. census, 119 people lived in the village, of whom 56 were men and 63 were women. According to the 2001 Ukrainian census, that number had grown to 127.

=== Languages ===
According to the 2001 Ukrainian census, the primary languages of the village's inhabitants were:

Language	Percentage
Ukrainian	94.49 %
Russian	3.15 %
Moldovan (Romanian)	2.36 %
