= Bilozerka Raion =

Former subdivision of Kherson Oblast, Ukraine

Bilozerskyi Raion Білозерський район
- Raion
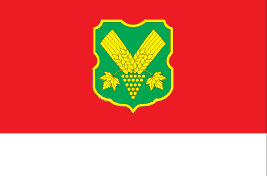
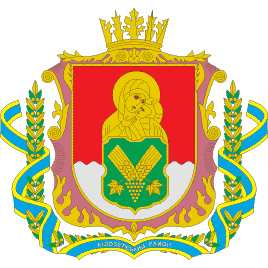
- Flag Coat of arms

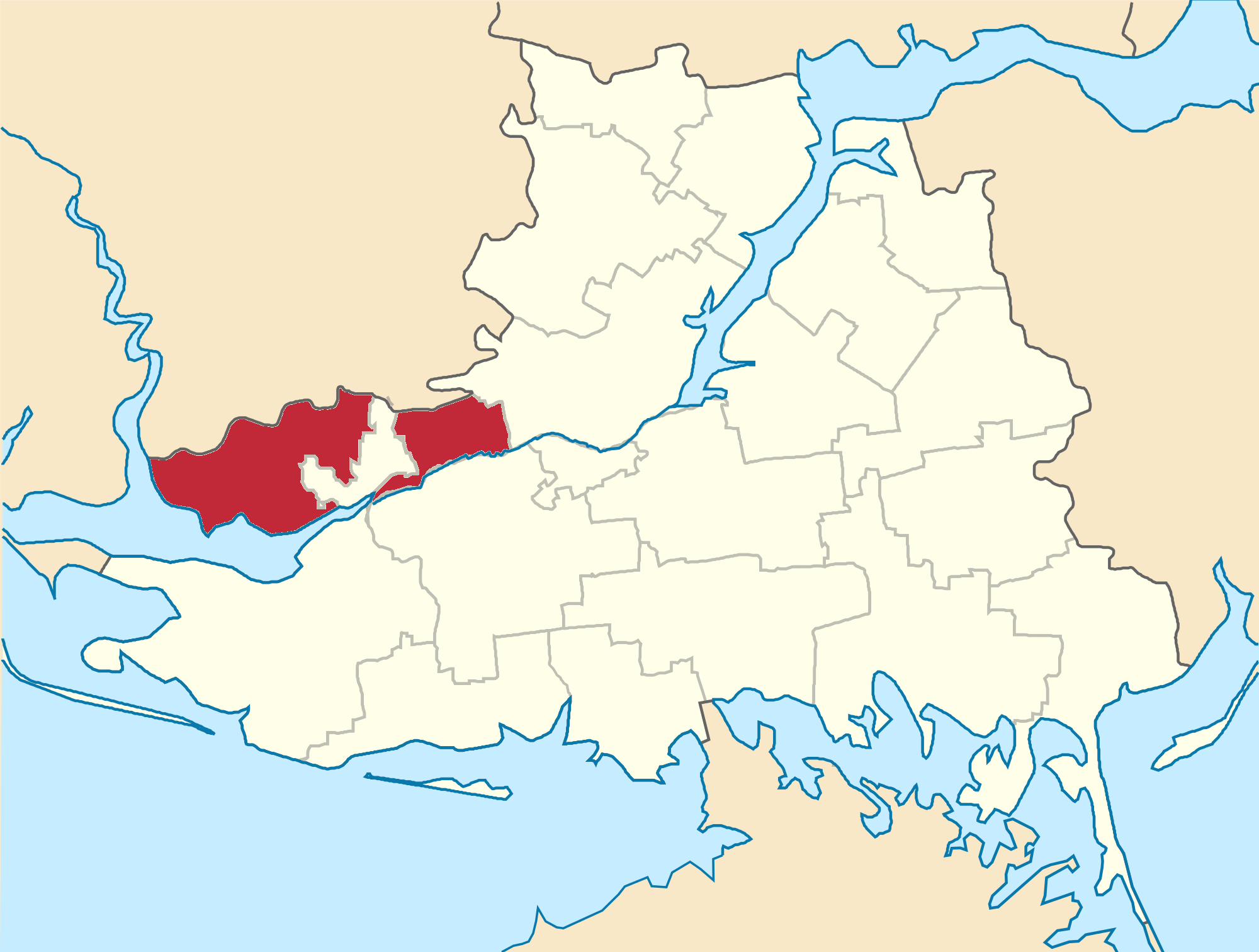
- Coordinates: 46°40′47.139″N 32°18′5.1546″E
- Country: Ukraine
- Region: Kherson Oblast
- Established: 1939
- Disestablished: 18 July 2020
- Admin. center: Bilozerka
- Subdivisions: List: 0 — city councils; 1 — settlement councils; 21 — rural councils; Number of localities: 0 — cities; 1 — urban-type settlements; 38 — villages; 16 — rural settlements

Government
  - Governor: Valeriy Poddubniy

Area
  - Total: 1,700 km^{2} (660 sq mi)

Population (2020)
  - Total: 64,790 ▼
  - Density: 38/km^{2} (99/sq mi)
- Time zone: UTC+02:00 (EET)
  - Summer (DST): UTC+03:00 (EEST)
- Postal index: 75000—75053
- Area code: +380 5547

Bilozerka Raion (Ukrainian: Білозерський район) was one of the 18 former administrative raions (districts) of Kherson Oblast in southern Ukraine. Its administrative center was located in the urban-type settlement of Bilozerka. The raion was disestablished on 18 July 2020 as part of the administrative reform of Ukraine, which reduced the number of raions of Kherson Oblast to five. The area of the former Bilozerka Raion was merged into Kherson Raion. The last estimate of the raion population was 64,790 (2020 est.)

At the time of disestablishment, the raion consisted of five hromadas:

- Bilozerka settlement hromada with the administration in Bilozerka;
- Chornobaivka rural hromada with the administration in the selo of Chornobaivka;
- Darivka rural hromada with the administration in the selo of Darivka;
- Muzykivka rural hromada with the administration in the selo of Muzykivka;
- Stanislav rural hromada with the administration in the selo of Stanislav.
