= History of Dnipro (city) =

The history of Dnipro starts with the human settlement of the city, which is first attested in the Neolithic period. In the Antiquity, the area of the future city was ruled by Scythians and a number of other tribes. In the Middle Ages, an Orthodox monastery existed on one of the islands on the Dneper, which now lays in the city borders. The region was devastated by the Mongol invasion of Rus' and later came under the influence of the Grand Duchy of Lithuania (later the Polish-Lithuanian Commonwealth. During this period, settlements of Zaporozhian Cossacks appeared on the lands of modern-day Dnipro, and a Polish fortress was constructed on one of the rapids south of the city.

After the Cossack rebellion of 1648, the area came under the rule of Zaporozhian Sich, a self-governed republic of Ukrainian Cossacks. After the Treaty of Andrusovo, the Zaporozhian Sich came under joint Muscovite–Polish protectorate, and according to the Treaty of Perpetual Peace (1686) the Sich came under control of the Tsardom of Russia. In the 18th century, the Lower Dnieper area was a scene of numerous wars between the Russian Empire, Crimean Tatars and the Ottomans. Ukrainian Cossack troops played a key role in the Russian conquest and colonization of the former Wild Fields and the incorporation of the Black Sea region into the Russian Empire. To facilitate the assimilation of the newly acquired territories, empress Catherine the Great abolished the Cossack autonomy in Ukraine and founded new settlements to increase the imperial influence. One of these settlements, founded on the territory of Zaporozhian sloboda Polovytsia received the name of Yekaterinoslav (Ukrainian: Катеринослав – Katerynoslav). This event started the history of future Dnipro as a major urban centre.

In the late 18th to early 19th century, Yekaterinoslav (between 1796 and 1802 known as Novorossiysk, was the centre of first Novorossiya and later Yekaterinoslav Governorate. With the start of industrialization in the mid-19th century, the city became a major centre of heavy industry. A number of scientific institutions were founded in Yekaterinoslav, and it became an influential centre of culture. The city's population before the Russian Revolution was multinational, with the majority of the population consisting of Russians, Jews and Ukrainians, but minorities of Poles, Germans and other ethnicities of the Russian Empire were also prominent. A number of ethnic conflicts emerged during this time, including the pogroms during the 1905 revolution.

After the February Revolution and abdication of the tsar, a local council (soviet) was formed in the city. This time was marked by rivalry between Russian Bolsheviks and Ukrainian nationalists and Social Democrats. The former wished to preserve Ukraine under the rule of Russia, to use its resources for the future world revolution; the latter wished Ukraine to receive autonomous rights. As a result, after the Bolshevik Coup in Russia, which local Communists supported, Katerynoslav became a place of fighting, which comprised a part of Ukrainian War of Independence and the wider Russian Civil War. Anarchist forces led by Nestor Makhno, as well as German and Austro-Hungarian troops, also played a role in fighting over the city. Finally, in 1919 the Communist installed its control over the city as part of the new de jure independent Ukrainian Soviet Socialist Republic.

After 1922 Katerynoslav became part of the newly founded Soviet Union, of which Ukraine was one of the nominally autonomous member republics. In 1926 the city was renamed to Dnipropetrovsk (Russian: Днепропетровск – Dnepropetrovsk). Under the Soviet rule, the city continued to develop as an industrial centre, especially in branches of metallurgy, machine-building and chemical industry. Processes of industrialization led to increased migration from surrounding rural areas, which contributed to Ukrainization. By 1939, more than half of Dnipropetrovsk's population were of Ukrainian ethnicity. During the Second World War the city was occupied by Nazi Germany, and most of local Jews were exterminated as part of the Holocaust.

After the war Dnipropetrovsk became a major centre of Soviet military industry, and produced a number of prominent politicians and functionaries who held a number of important positions in the Soviet, and later Ukrainian government (see Dnipropetrovsk clan). The city was also infamous as one of the centres of punitive psychiatry in the USSR. After the dissolution of the Soviet Union in 1991 Dnipropetrovsk became part of independent Ukraine. It has been known as a powerhouse of banking and trade, as well as a major administrative and political centre. According to the Ukrainian laws on Decommunization, in 2016 the city was renamed to Dnipro.

== Early history ==
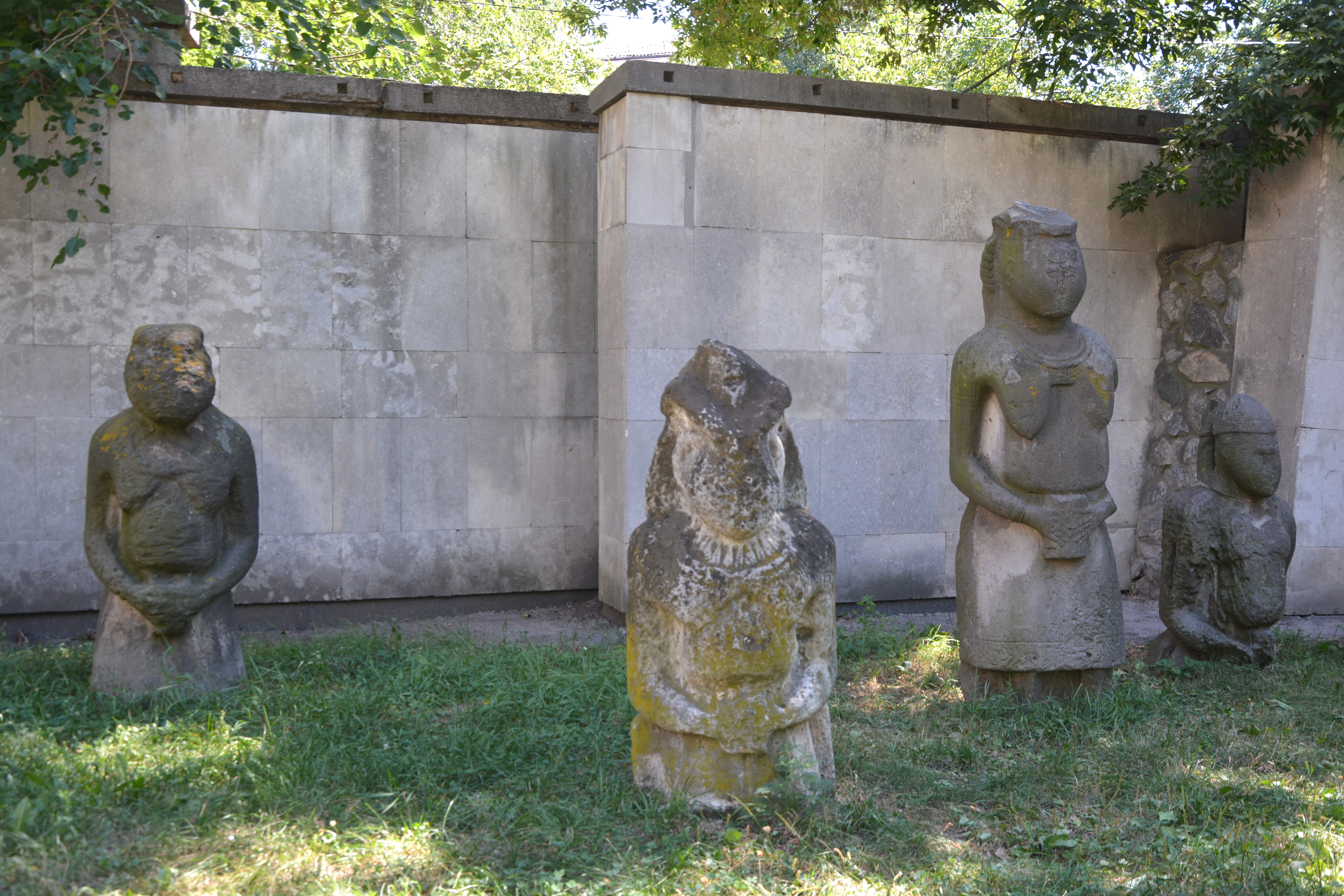
A part of the Cuman statue collection of the Dmytro Yavornytsky National Historical Museum of Dnipro

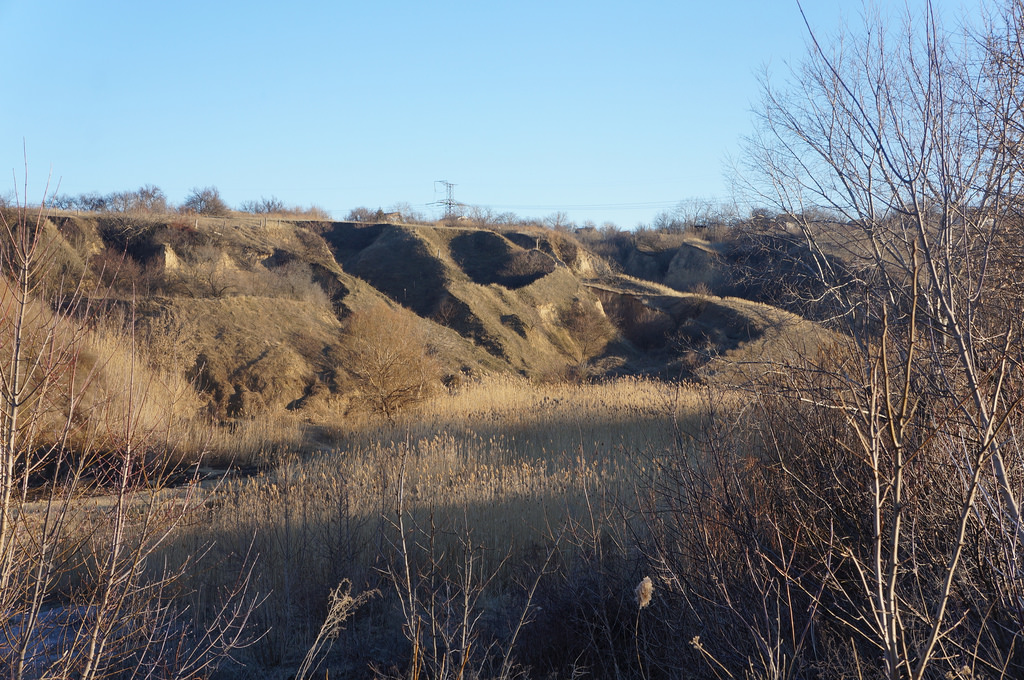
Remains of fortifications from the Polish era in Stari Kodaky on the outskirts of Dnipro

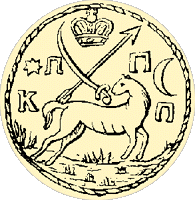
Seal of Kodak palanka, to which the area of Dnipro belonged in the Cossack times

Human settlements in current Dnipropetrovsk Oblast date from the Paleolithic era. According to archeological finds, in the Paleolithic period (7—3 thousand Anno Domini) human settlements appear near the Aptekarska brook in what is now Chechelivskyi District and on Monastyrskyi Island. A Neolithic stonecrafter's house has been excavated in one of Dnipro's city parks. In the Bronze Age the area was settled by diverse tribes. Traces of Cimmerian settlements during the Bronze Age have been found near today's Taras Shevchenko Park. The area of modern Dnipro was part of the Scythian empire from approximately the 1st century BC until the 3rd century BC. During the Migration Period (300–800) nomadic tribes of the Huns, Avars, Bulgarians, and Magyars passed through the lands of the Dnieper region, they came into contact with local agricultural East Slavs.

The area of modern Dnipro was part of the Kievan Rus' (882–1240). The region witnessed fighting between the armies of Kievan Rus' and Khazars, Pechenegs, Tork people and Cumans. In the 13th century the Dnieper region was devastated during the Mongol Empire conquest of Kievan Rus'. The area of modern Dnipro city was incorporated into the Mongol's khanate Golden Horde.

In the 15th century the area became part of the Kiev Voivodeship (1471–1565) of the Polish–Lithuanian Commonwealth. Archeological finds in today's Dnipro's urban district Samarskyi District suggest that the important river crossing was a trading settlement from at least 1524. A 1526 map by Polish cartographer Bernard Wapowski indicated a settlement existed on the territory of modern Dnipro. The Dnipro city council officially set 1526 as the date of the city's foundation in August 2026. (Previously 1776 was the official date of the foundation of Dnipro.) This year of foundation is based on the existence of the Stara Samar settlement on the territory of the modern Dnipro. Starting in December 2025 the city council had been consulting with experts to set a new official year of the city's foundation; since they believe 1776 "is a myth of imperial Russia", and that the city existed many years before 1776.

In 1635, the Polish–Lithuanian Commonwealth built the Kodak Fortress above the Dnieper Rapids at Kodaky on the south-eastern outskirts of modern Dnipro near the current Kaidatsky Bridge, only to have it destroyed within months by the Cossacks of Ivan Sulyma. Rebuilt in 1645, it was captured by Zaporozhian Sich in 1648.

Around the fortress a settlement emerged that became a town in Kodak Palanka (province) of the Zaporizhian Sich called New Kodak. Cossacks often hid the true number of the population to reduce taxation and other obligations, but according to documentary evidence, it can be assumed that the population of New Kodak was at least 3,000 people. The fortress was garrisoned by Cossacks until the Sich, allied with the Ottoman Empire and their Tartar vassals, drove out the encroaching Tsardom of Russia. Under the terms of the Russian withdrawal—the Treaty of the Pruth in 1711—the Kodak fortress was demolished.

In the mid-1730s the fortress and Russians returned, living in an uneasy cohabitation with local cossacks. From mid-century they co-existed with the Zaporozhian sloboda (or "free settlement") of Polovytsia located on the site of today's Central Terminal and the Ozyorka farmers market.

In the Russo-Turkish War (1768–1774) the Zaporozhian cossacks allied with Empress Catherine II. No sooner had they assisted the Russians to victory than they faced an imperial ultimatum to disband their confederation. The liquidation of the Sich destroyed their political autonomy and saw the incorporation of their lands into the new governates of Novorossiya. In 1784, Catherine ordered the foundation of new city, commonly referred to at the time as Katerynoslav.

In 2001 the seal of Kodak Palanka became the central element of Dnipro's coat of arms and Dnipro's official flag.

== Imperial city ==
Historical affiliations

Russian Empire 1776–1917
Ukrainian People's Republic 1917–1918
∟ autonomous part of the Russian Republic
Ukrainian State 1918
Ukrainian People's Republic 1918–1920
Ukrainian Soviet Socialist Republic 1920–1941
∟ part of the Soviet Union from 1922
Reichskommissariat Ukraine 1941–1944
∟ part of German-occupied Europe
Ukrainian Soviet Socialist Republic 1944–1991
∟ part of the Soviet Union
Ukraine 1991–present

=== Establishment of Catherine's city ===
The first written mention of a town in the Russian Empire called Yekaterinoslav can be found in a report from Azov Governor Vasily Chertkov to Grigory Potemkin on 23 April 1776. He wrote "The provincial city called Yekaterinoslav should be the best convenience on the right side of the Dnieper River near Kaydak..." (Which referred to New Kodak). In 1777, a town named Yekaterinoslav (the glory of Catherine), was built to the north of the present-day city at the confluence of the Samara and Kilchen rivers. The site was badly chosen – spring waters transformed the city into a bog. The surviving settlement was later renamed Novomoskovsk.

The territory of modern Dnipro, despite the modern-day city's size, still has not expanded to encompass the territory of (Chertkov's) Yekaterinoslav of 1776. On 22 January 1784 Russian Empress Catherine the Great signed an Imperial Ukase directing that "the gubernatorial city under name of Yekaterinoslav be moved to the right bank of the Dnieper river near Kodak". The new city would serve Grigory Potemkin as a Viceregal seat for the combined Novorossiya and Azov Governorates.

In 1778, the town was used to hold resettled Greek and Armenian Christians from the Emigration of Christians from Crimea in 1778. Over the next few years, the Armenians were resettled to Nakhichevan-na-Donu, whereas the Greeks were resettled to the vicinity of the city of Mariupol.

On 20 May [O.S. 9 May] 1787, in the course of her celebrated Crimean journey, the Empress laid the foundation stone of the Transfiguration Cathedral in the presence of Austrian Emperor Joseph II, Polish king Stanisław August Poniatowski, and the French and English ambassadors. Potemkin's grandiose plans for a third Russian imperial capital alongside Moscow and Saint Petersburg included a viceregal palace, a university (Potemkin envisioned Yekaterinoslav as the 'Athens of southern Russia'), courts of law and a botanical garden, were frustrated by a renewal of the Russo-Turkish war in 1787, by bureaucratic procrastination, defective workmanship, and theft, Potemkin's death in 1791 and that of his imperial patroness five years later.

In 1815 a government official described the town as "more like some Dutch [Mennonite] colony then a provincial administrative centre". The cathedral, much reduced in size, was completed in 1835.

==== Disputed year of foundation ====
Scholarship concerning the foundation of the city has been subject to political considerations and dispute. In 1976, to have the bicentenary of the city coincide with the 70th anniversary of the birth of Soviet party leader, and regional native son, Leonid Brezhnev, the date of the city's foundation was moved back from the visit Russian Empress Catherine II in 1787, to 1776.

Following Ukrainian independence, local historians began to promote the idea of a town emerging in the 17th century from Cossack settlements, an approach aimed at promoting the city's Ukrainian identity. They cited the chronicler of the Zaporozhian Cossacks, Dmytro Yavornytsky, whose History of the City of Ekaterinoslav completed in 1940 was authorised for publication only in 1989, the era of Glasnost.

In December 2025 the Dnipro City Council was in an ongoing consulting process with experts to set a new official year of the Dnipro's foundation. According to them the official year of founding 1776 "is a myth of imperial Russia", and that the city existed many years before 1776.

=== Growth as an industrial centre ===
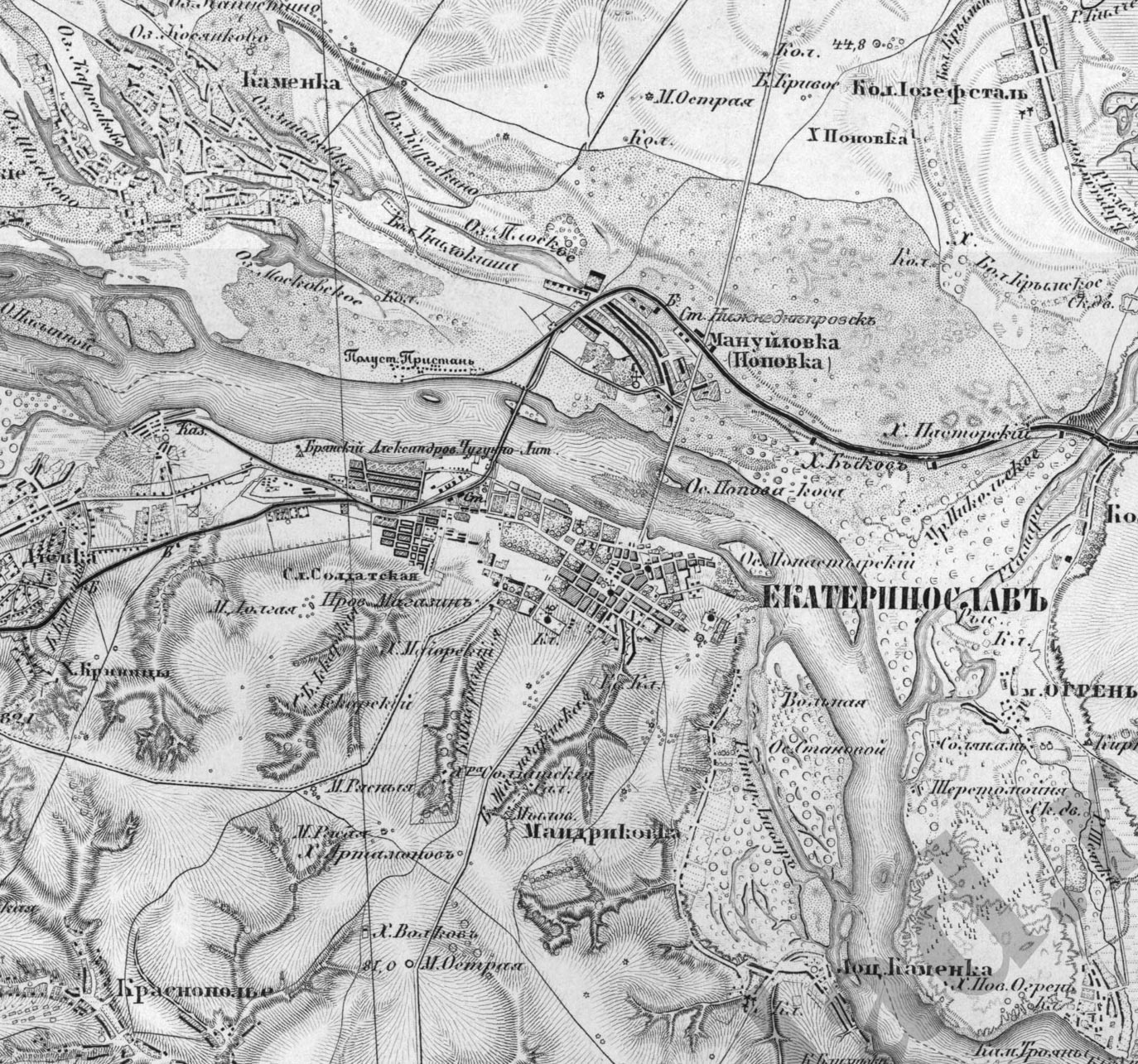
A map of Ekaterinoslav, 1885 (Note: There is some confusion concerning the date of this map. According to the image file the map is by Schubert and dates from about 1860, but Ukrainian Wikipedia claims that it dates from 1885. The map shows the old (railway) Amur Bridge across the river, which was completed in 1884.)

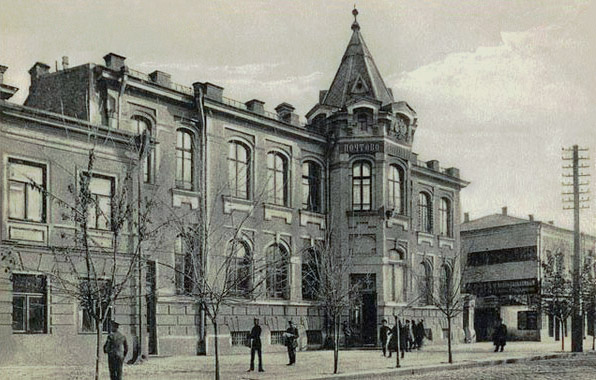
The Main Post Office, 1870

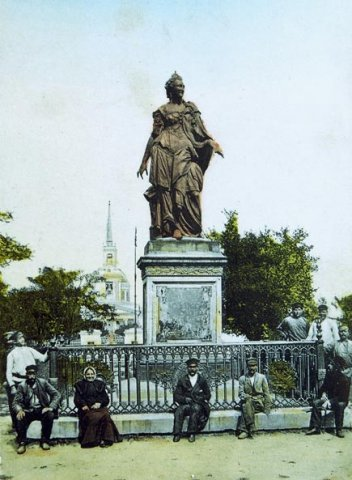
Catherine the Great monument in Ekaterinoslav (1840–1920). This monument that stood in front of the Mining Institute was replaced by Soviet authorities with one of Russian academic Mikhail Lomonosov.

While into the late nineteenth century the principal business of the town remained the processing of agricultural raw materials, there was an early state-sponsored effort to promote manufacture. In 1794 the government supported two factories: a textile factory that was transferred from the town of Dubrovny Mogilev Governorate and a silk-stockings factory that was brought from the village of Kupavna near Moscow. In 1797 the textile factory employed 819 permanent workers, 378 of whom were women and 115 children. The silk stocking workers, the majority being women, were serfs bought at an auction for 16,000 roubles. Conditions, as Potemkin himself was forced to admit, were harsh, with many of the workers dying from malnutrition and exhaustion.

From 1797 to 1802, while serving under the Emperor Paul I as the administrative centre of a centre of the Novorossiya Governorate, the settlement was officially known as Novorossiysk.

Despite the bridging of the Dnieper in 1796, commerce was slow to develop. 1832 saw the establishment of the small Zaslavsky iron-casting factory, the town's first metallurgical enterprise. Industrialisation gathered apace in the 1880s with the establishment of the first railway connections. Rail construction responded to the enterprise of two men: John Hughes, a Welsh businessman who built an iron works at Yuzovka in 1869–72, and developed the Donbas coal deposits; and the Russian geologist Alexander Pol, who in 1866 had discovered the Kryvyi Rih (then known as Krivoy Rog) iron ore basin, Kryvbas, during archaeological research.

In 1884, a railway to supply pig iron foundries in Krivoy Rog with Donbas coal crossed the Dnieper at Yekaterinoslav. It proved a spur to further industrial development and to the creation of the new suburbs of Amur and Nyzhnodniprovsk.

In 1897, Yekaterinoslav became the third city in the Russian Empire to have electric trams. The Yekaterinoslav Higher Mining School, today's Dnipro Polytechnic, was founded in 1899. Within twenty years the population had more than tripled, reaching 157,000 in 1904. The immigrants flowing into the city were mainly ethnic or cultural Russians and Jews, with the Ukrainian population remaining rural in this stage of the Industrial Revolution.

=== The Jewish community and the 1905 pogrom ===
From 1792 Yekaterinoslav was within the Pale of Settlement, the former Polish-Lithuanian territories in which Catherine and her successors enforced no limitation on the movement and residency of their Jewish subjects. Within less than a century, a largely Yiddish-speaking Jewish community of 40,000 constituted more than a third of the city's population, and contributed a considerable share of its business capital and industrial workforce.

Such apparent strength did not protect the community—members of whom had had the unpopular task of collecting government taxes and recruiting young men for the army— from communal violence. In 1883, three days of rioting destroyed Jewish business, and persuaded many to temporarily leave the city. There was a return of anti–Semitic incitement among the Christian public in 1904, but attacks on community were, at that time, suppressed on the order of a liberal governor.

In the widespread social unrest that followed the 1905 defeat in the Russo-Japanese War, the political life of the city was dominated by the revolutionary opposition (including the Jewish Workers Socialist Party and the Bund) and by the insurrectionary spirit of the nascent labor movement. The local czarist authorities were able to ride out the wave political protests and strikes, in part by playing on division between Jewish workers who predominated as clerks and artisans in the city, and Russian workers employed in the large suburban factories. There was a wave of anti-Semitic attacks. With the army intervening against Jewish defense groups, about 100 Jews were killed and two hundred wounded.

According to local historian Andrii Portnov, 40% of the local Yekaterinoslav population was Jewish in the years leading up to World War I.

== The Soviet era ==
=== War and revolution ===
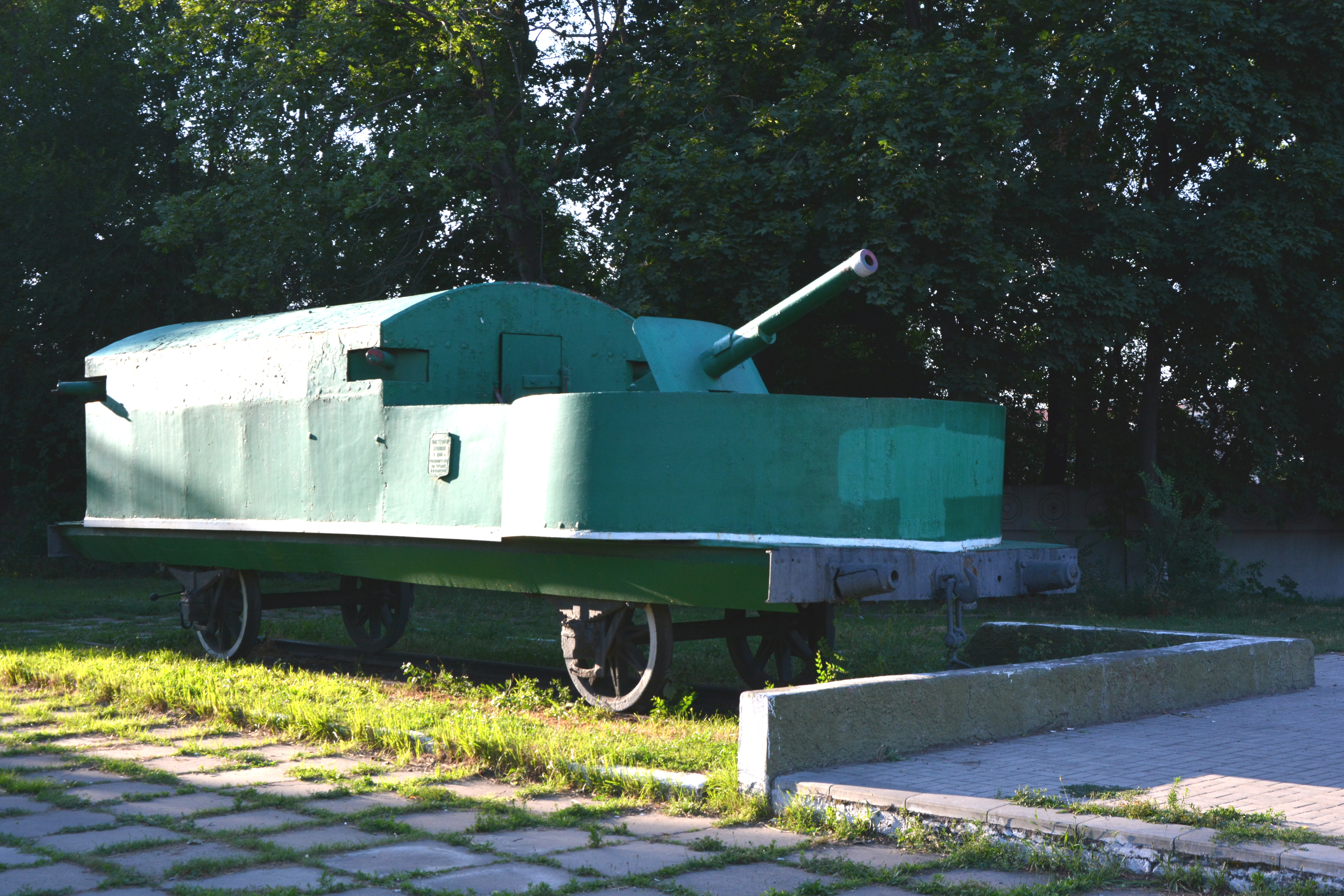
Monument in Dnipro of an armored train that was built by the workers of Yekaterinoslav's Bryansk plant in 1918, which was employed by the Red Army in its conquest of Ukraine and the Volga region.

Directly following the Russian February Revolution, in the night of 3 March O.S (16 March N.S) to 4 March 1917 a provisional government was organised in Yekaterinoslav headed by the (since 1913) chairman of the provincial land administration Konstantin von Hesberg. Also on 4 March a Council of Workers' Deputies was formed. On 6 March the prime minister of the Russian Provisional Government Georgy Lvov removed the governor and the vice-governor of Yekaterinoslav Governorate, temporarily handing these powers to Hesberg. On 9 March a Yekaterinoslav Council of Workers and Soldiers deputies was formed.

On 16 May the Council of Workers' Deputies and the Council of Workers and Soldiers merged, to become named the Revolutionary Council in November 1917. All these power structures existed in duality, with Hesberg's provisional government often being in a disadvantage. In 1917 the city saw numerous meetings, rallies, meetings, conferences, congresses and demonstrations by political parties all over the political spectrum. Due to intense political agitation the newly formed factory committees and professional unions by autumn of 1917 mainly supported the Bolsheviks, significantly strengthening their positions.

In June 1917 a Central Council (Tsentralna Rada) of Ukrainian parties in Kiev declared Yekaterinoslav to be within the territory of the autonomous Ukrainian People's Republic (UPR). On 13 August 1917 the first democratic Yekaterinoslav 120 seats city Duma election took place. The Bolsheviks gained 24 seats and the Mensheviks 16, with pro-Ukrainian parties picking up 6 seats. Vasyl Osipov was elected Mayor of the city. Osipov was Mayor until the dissolution of the city Duma in May 1918. On 10 November 1917 a parade of Ukrainian troops was held, organized by the Yekaterinoslav Ukrainian Military Council in support of the Third Universal of the Ukrainian Central Council, the proclamation of the Ukrainian People's Republic.

In the November 1917 elections to the Russian Constituent Assembly, the Bolsheviks secured just under 18 percent of the vote in the Governorate, compared to 46 percent for the Ukrainian Socialist Revolutionaries and their allies. On 22 November 1917 the Revolutionary Council and the city Duma pledged their allegiance to the Tsentralna Rada. The Bolsheviks then left these organisations. During December, the situation in the city worsened with both sides preparing for military action.

On 26 December, the Bolsheviks defied an ultimatum from the Tsentralna Rada and after three days of fighting consolidated their control of the city. On 12 February they declared Yekaterinoslav part of a Donetsk-Krivoy Rog Soviet Republic, but the following month, under the terms of the Treaty of Brest-Litovsk, conceded the territory to the German and Austrian-allied UPR. On 5 April 1918 the Imperial German army entered the city. Five hundred remaining Bolshevik Red Guards were publicly executed.

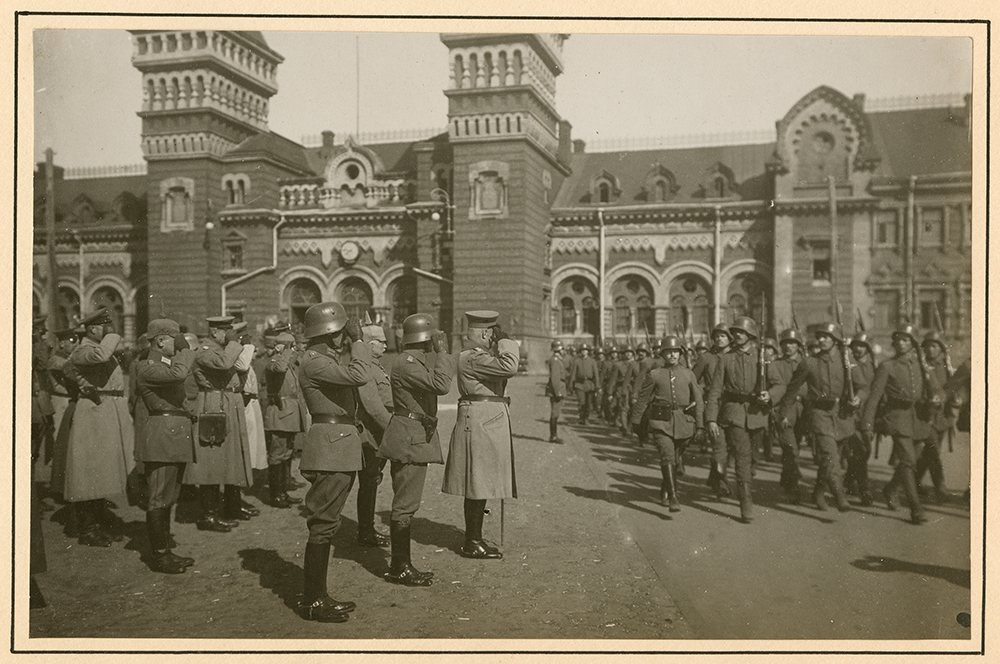
A German military parade in Yekaterinoslav in spring 1918.

The formal tenure of the UPR was brief: on 29 April 1918 intervention by the Central Powers saw the UPR replaced by the more pliant Ukrainian State or Hetmanate. On 18 May 1918 the Hetman of the Ukrainian State, Pavlo Skoropadskyi, ordered the previously nationalized enterprises returned to their former owners, and with the assistance of Austro-Hungarian troops the new authorities suppressed labor protest.

On 23 December 1918, following their defeat by the Western Allies and after four days of insurgency within the city, German and Austro-Hungarian occupation forces withdrew. Four days later, Yekaterinoslav was stormed by the anarchist Revolutionary Insurgent Army of Ukraine (the Makhnovshchina), putting to flight forces loyal to the UPR's new Directorate. Over the course of the following year, city was to change hands several more times, contested between the UPR, the Whites (Armed Forces of South Russia), Nykyfor Hryhoriv's peasant insurgents, Makhnovshchina (who returned twice), and the Bolsheviks, who reorganised as the Red Army, finally secured the city on 30 December 1919.

The city had been extensively damaged and the population, which had stood at about 268,000 people in 1917, had dropped to under 190,000.

=== Stalin-era industrialisation ===
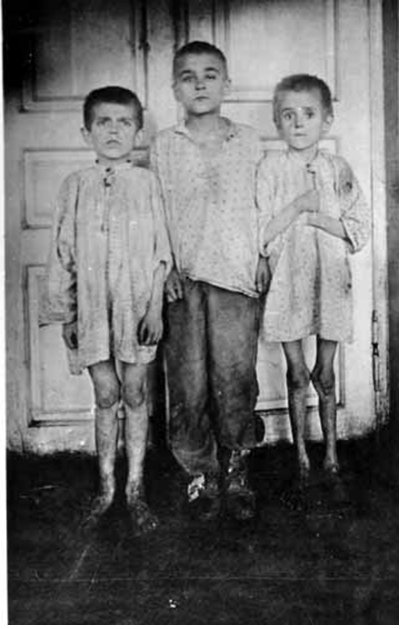
The boy on the left murdered an 8-year-old for his 4 pounds of bread in Yekaterinoslav in 1922, during the local 1921–1923 famine.

In late May 1920 the food supply to Yekaterinoslav deteriorated, resulting in a wave of strikes. In June 1920 Soviet authorities quelled one such protest by arresting 200 railway workers, of which 51 were sentenced to immediate execution.

In 1922 the region was incorporated into the Ukrainian SSR, a constituent republic of the Soviet Union. In 1922 the Soviet government ordered that "all nationalized enterprises with names related to the Company or the Surname of the old owners must be renamed in memory of revolutionary events, in memory of the international, all-Russian or local leaders of the proletarian revolution." In 1922 and 1923 the factories were renamed, as well as dozens of streets, alleys, driveways, squares and parks. In 1923 the city council adopted a resolution to organize a competition to rename the city itself.

In 1924 a Provincial Congress of Soviets adopted a resolution on renaming the city of Yekaterinoslav to the city of Krasnodniprovsk (and Yekaterinoslav Governorate to Krasnodniprovsk Governorate). Following this, many organizations and institutions began to name Yekaterinoslav Krasnodniprovsk in official documents, only to be reminded in the press that the renaming of settlements could only be decided by the Presidium of the Supreme Soviet. In 1926 a provisional District Congress of Workers', Peasants' and Soldiers' Deputies adopted a resolution on renaming Yekaterinoslav to the name Dnipropetrovsk in honour of the All-Ukrainian Congress of Soviets's chairman of the All-Ukrainian Central Executive Committee, Grigory Petrovsky.

Petrovsky was present at this congress and he did "accept this honour with great gratitude." The resolution of the congress was approved by a resolution of the Presidium of the Supreme Soviet dated 20 July 1926. In the 1920s and 1930s dozens of streets, alleys, driveways, squares and parks continued to be renamed in the city, this continued in the 1940s and in subsequent years.

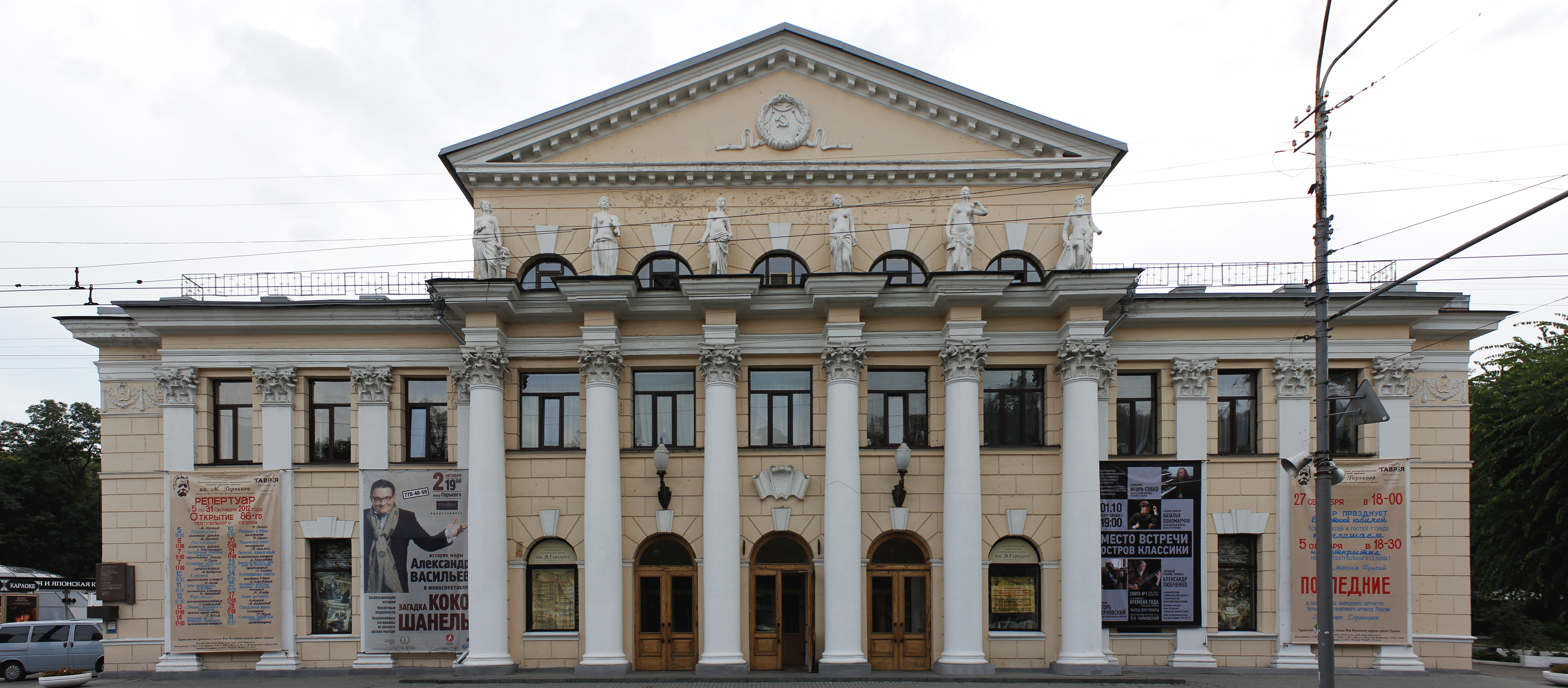
The city's Comedy and Drama Theatre was constructed during the Stalinist period.

By 1927 the industry of Dnipropetrovsk was completely rebuilt, and according to some indicators exceeded pre-war levels. Due to agrarian overpopulation, an influx of unemployed from other settlements, a higher birth rates among other reasons, both employment and unemployment in Dnipropetrovsk rose. In the late twenties, the authorities had to contend with growing labour unrest. "Do not strangle us, our children are dying of hunger, we have been placed in worse conditions than under the old regime" read one protest.

The city figured prominently in Stalin's Five-Year Plans for industrialisation. In 1932, Dnipropetrovsk's regional metallurgical plants produced 20 per cent of the entire cast iron and 25 per cent of the steel manufactured in the Ukrainian SSR. By the end of the thirties the Dnipropetrovsk region became the most urbanised of Soviet Ukraine with more than 2,273,000 people living in the region and over half a million in the city proper. Dnipropetrovsk became an important cultural and educational centre with ten colleges and a State University.

The surrounding countryside was devastated by the policy of forced collectivisation and grain seizures. Peasants had died en masse during the Holodomor of 1932–33. Dnipropetrovsk Oblast in the years 1932–33 lost 3.5 to 9.8 million people. Making it one of the most affected areas of the famine.

Drawn by employment in the expanding heavy industry, the survivors changed the ethnic composition of the city. The percentage of residents recorded as Ukrainian rose from 36 percent of the population in 1926 to 54.6 percent in 1939. The Russian percentage fell from 31.6 to 23.4, and the Jewish share fell from 26.8 to 17.9. The city's population during the Interwar period grew rapidly. 368,000 people lived in Dnipropetrovsk in 1932. In the 1939 Soviet Census, this number had grown to more than half a million (500,662 people).

Soviet Ukrainization and Korenizatsiya were implemented in Dnipropetrovsk. The Communist party of Ukraine organized special courses in Ukrainian studies. Soviet authorities greatly increased the number of schools, and by the mid-1930s had eradicate illiteracy in the city. New universities were opened. At the end of the 1930s Dnipropetrovsk had 10 higher and 19 special educational institutions. In the 1930s a significant number of new secondary schools and hospitals were built in the city, and city parks were improved.

The Great Purge, following the Assassination of Sergei Kirov, also reached Dnipropetrovsk. In 1935 the Dnipropetrovsk NKVD arrested 182 "Trotskyists". In 1935, 235 alleged "internal enemies" were executed, including a few university rectors. In 1936, 526 people were executed. In 1937, the regional administration of the NKVD killed 16,421 people.

=== Nazi occupation ===
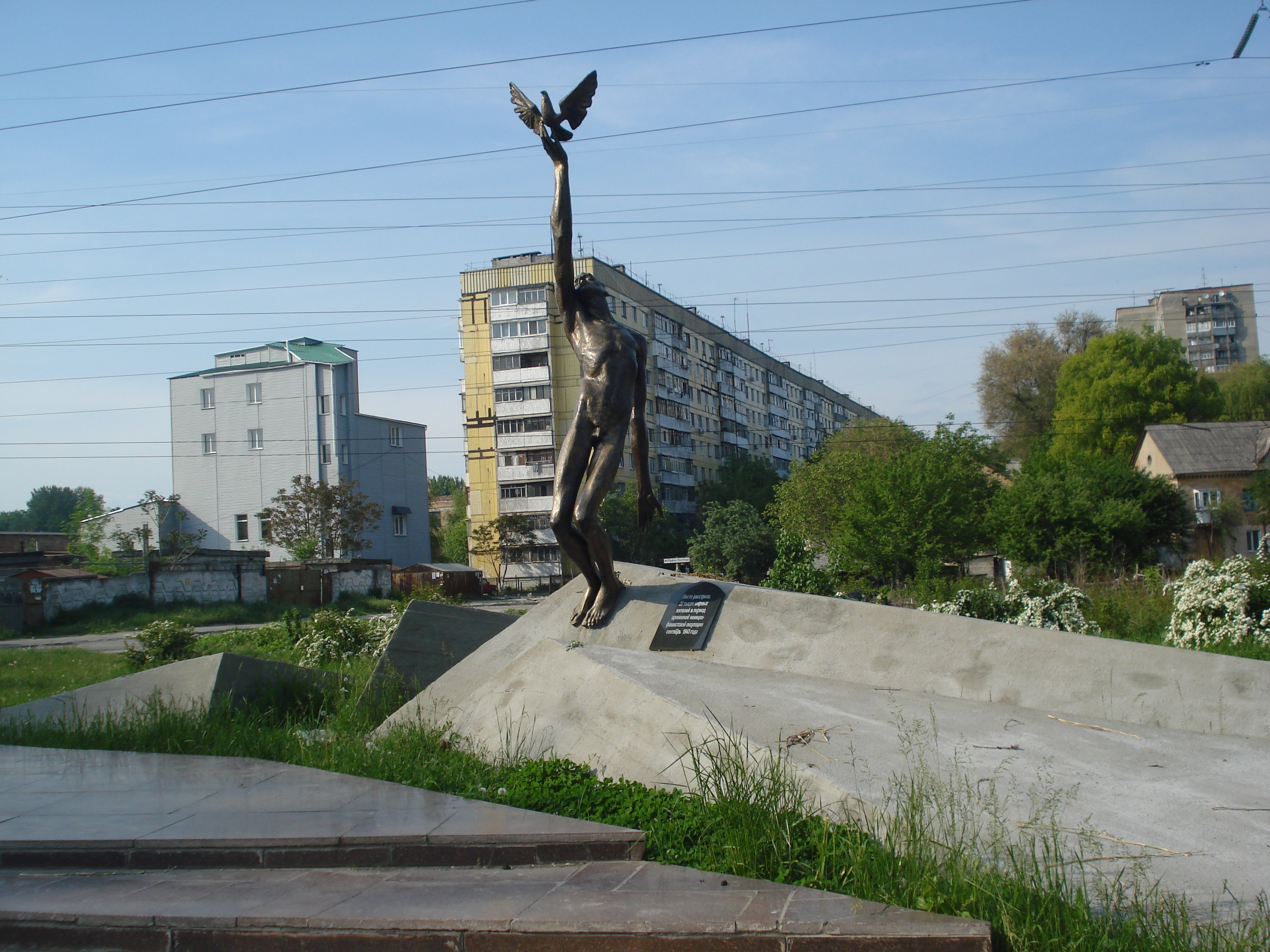
Monument to 20,000 Jews shot by Germans in 1943 in Dnipropetrovsk. The monumental inscription (in Russian) does not explicitly identify the victims as Jewish, but speaks of "20,000 civilians."

Dnipropetrovsk was under Nazi occupation from 26 August 1941 to 25 October 1943. The city was administered as part of the Reichskommissariat Ukraine. The Holocaust in Dnipropetrovsk reduced the city's remaining Jewish population, estimates for which range from 55,000 to 30,000, to just 702. In just two days, 13–14 October 1941, the Germans killed 15,000.

In a series of camps in the city (Stammlager 348), the occupiers are estimated to have killed upwards of 30,000 Soviet POWs.

In November 1941 Dnipropetrovsk's population was 233,000. In March 1942 this number had fallen to 178,000. On 25 October 1943 the population on the right-bank of the city numbered no more than 5,000. According to official statistics, in 1945 the population of Dnipropetrovsk had increased to 259,000 people.

=== Post-war closed city ===
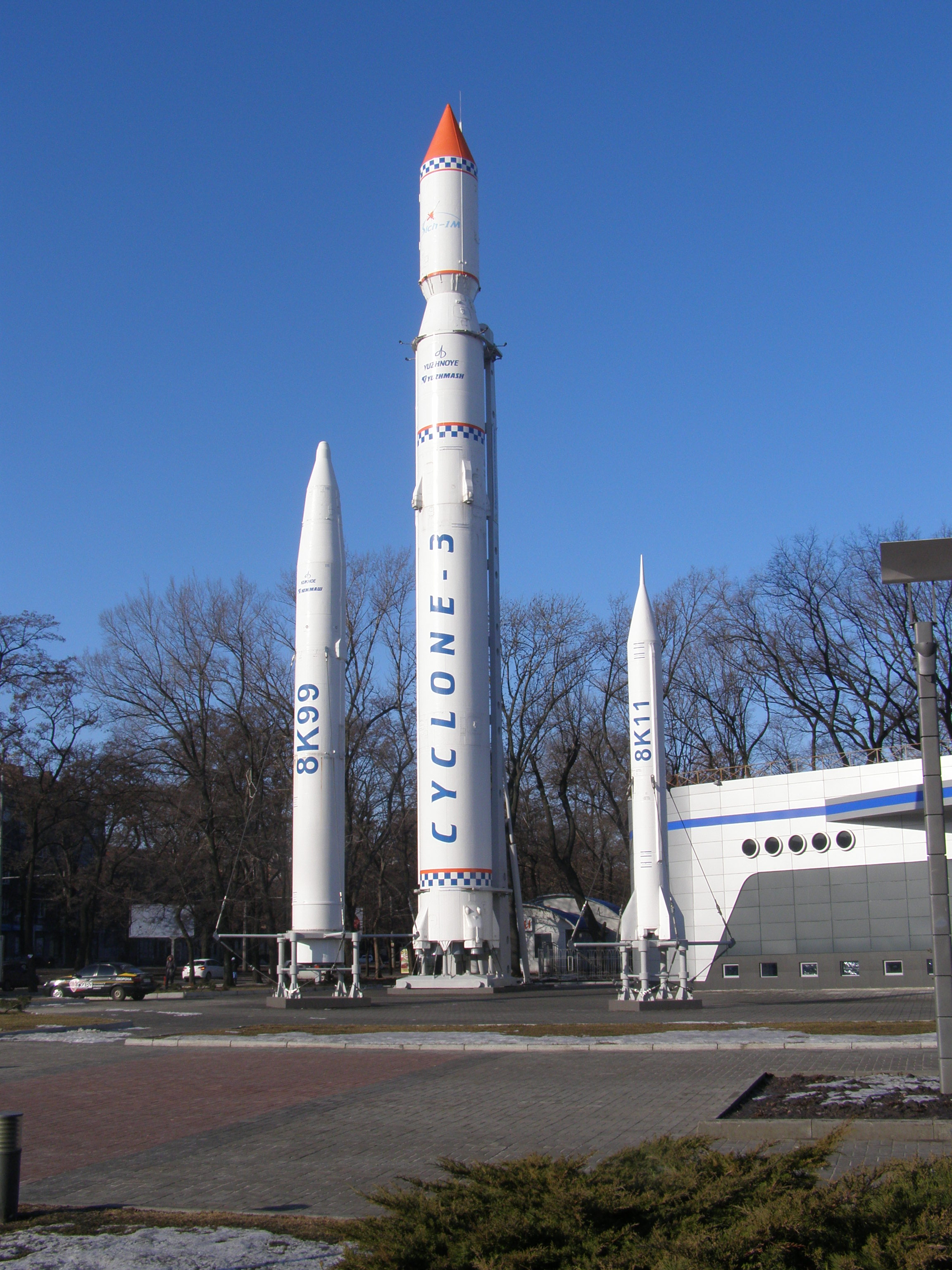
A Yuzhmash produced Tsyklon-3 rocket, flanked by an RT-20P and R-11 Zemlya on display in Dnipro's "Rocket Park".

As early as July 1944, the State Committee of Defence in Moscow decided to build a large military machine-building factory in Dnipropetrovsk on the location of the pre-war aircraft plant. In December 1945, thousands of German prisoners of war began construction and built the first sections and shops in the new factory. This was the foundation of the Dnipropetrovsk Automobile Factory. In 1954 the administration of this automobile factory opened a secret design office, designated OKB-586, to construct military missiles and rocket engines.

The high-security project was joined by hundreds of physicists, engineers and machine designers from Moscow and other large Soviet cities. In 1965, the secret Plant No. 586 was transferred to the USSR Ministry of General Machine-Building which renamed it "the Southern Machine-building Factory" (Yuzhnyi mashino-stroitel'nyi zavod) or in abbreviated Russian, simply Yuzhmash. Yuzhmash became a significant factor in the arms race of the Cold War (Nikita Khrushchev boasted in 1960 that it was producing rockets "like sausages" ).

In 1959, Dnipropetrovsk was officially closed to foreign visitors. No foreign citizen, even of a socialist state, was allowed to visit the city or district. Its citizens were held by Communist authorities to a higher standard of ideological purity than the rest of the population, and their freedom of movement was severely restricted. It was not until 1987, during perestroika, that Dnipropetrovsk was opened to international visitors and civil restrictions were lifted.

The population of Dnipropetrovsk increased from 259,000 people in 1945 to 845,200 in 1965.

Notwithstanding the high-security regime, in September and October 1972, workers downed tools in several factories in Dnipropetrovsk demanding higher wages, better food and living conditions, and the right to choose one's job. Labour militancy returned in the late 1980s, a period in which promises of Perestrioka and Glasnost raised popular expectations. In 1990 two thousand inmates rioted in the women's remand prison in a further of sign of growing unrest.

=== Dissent and youth rebellion ===
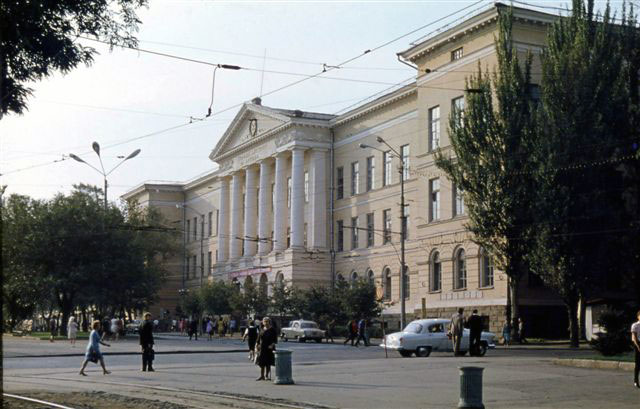
Dnipropetrovsk's Mining Institute, 1972.

In 1959 17.4% of Dnipropetrovsk students were taught in Ukrainian language schools and 82.6% in Russian language schools. 58% of the city's inhabitants self-identified as Ukrainians. Compared with the other 3 biggest cities of Ukraine Dnipropetrovsk had a rather large share of education conducted in Ukrainian. In Kiev 26.8% of pupils studied in Ukrainian and 73.1% in Russian while 66% of Kiev residents considered themselves Ukrainian, in Kharkiv these numbers were 4.9%, 95.1% and 49%. In Odesa these numbers were 8.1%, 91.9% and 40%. (Note: At the start of the 2018–2019 academic year, there were 31 Russian-speaking secondary schools left in the whole of Dnipropetrovsk Oblast. At the time the conversion of these 31 schools to Ukrainian language education was planned to be completed by 2023.)

As in the overall Ukrainian SSR, Dnipropetrovsk saw an influx of young immigrants from rural Ukraine. Dnipropetrovsk Oblast saw the highest inflow of rural youth of all Ukraine.

According to KGB reports, in the 1960s "Samizdat" and Ukrainian diaspora publications began to circulate via Western Ukraine in Dnipropetrovsk. These fed into underground student circles where they promoted interest in the "Ukrainian Sixtiers", in Ukrainian history, especially of Ukrainian Cossacks, and in the revival of the Ukrainian language. Occasionally the blue and yellow flag of independent Ukraine was unfurled in protest. The authorities responded with repression: arresting and jailing members of underground discussion groups for "nationalistic propaganda".

The growing evidence of dissent in the city coincided from the late 1960s with what the KGB referred to as "radio hooliganism". Thousands of high-school and college students had become ham radio enthusiasts, recording and rebroadcasting western popular music. Annual KGB reports regularly drew a connection between enthusiasm for western pop culture and anti-Soviet behaviour. In the 1980s, by which time the KGB had conceded that their raids against "hippies" had failed suppress the youth rebellion, (Note: In one of these cases in 1979, because the local Dnipropetrovsk perpetrator was Jewish, a KGB report linked Ukrainian nationalism with Jewish Zionism "by promoting dance music". In this case the (according to the KGB employee "American") band the Bee Gees.) such behaviour was reportedly found in an admixture of Anglo-American" heavy metal, punk rock and Banderism—the veneration of the Ukrainian fascist Stepan Bandera, and of other Ukrainian nationalists, who in the Soviet narrative were denounced and discredited as Nazi collaborators.

In an attempt to provide Dnipropetrovsk youth with an ideologically safe alternative, beginning in 1976 the local Komsomol set up approved discotheques. Some of the activists involved in this "disco movement" went on in the 1980s to engage in their own illicit tourist and music enterprises, and several later became influential figures in Ukrainian national politics, among them Yulia Tymoshenko, Victor Pinchuk, Serhiy Tihipko, Ihor Kolomoyskyi and Oleksandr Turchynov.

=== The "Dnipropetrovsk Mafia" ===
Reflecting Dnipropetrovsk's special strategic importance for the entire Soviet Union, party cadres from the "rocket city" played an outsized role not only in republican leadership in Kiev, but also in the Union leadership in Moscow. During Stalin's Great Purge, Leonid Brezhnev rose rapidly within the ranks of the local nomenklatura, from director of the Dnipropetrovsk Metallurgical Institute in 1936 to regional (Obkom) Party Secretary in charge of the city's defence industries in 1939.

Here, he took the first steps toward building a network of supporters which came to be known as the "Dnipropetrovsk Mafia". They spearheaded the internal party coup that in 1964 saw Brezhnev replace Nikita Khrushchev as General Secretary of the Communist Party of the Soviet Union and call a halt to further reform.

== Independent Ukraine ==
In a national referendum on 1 December 1991, 90.36% of Dnipropetrovsk's voters approved the declaration of independence that had been made by the Ukrainian parliament on 24 August. Amidst the economic dislocation and soaring inflation that accompanied the collapse of the Soviet Union, output declined. Although its economic contraction was at a rate below the national average, the Dnipropetrovsk city and oblast witnessed one of the largest population declines of all the regions of Ukraine. By 2021, the city's population, which had stood at over 1.2 million in 1991, had been reduced to 981,000. Young people from Dnipropetrovsk were among the millions of Ukrainians who left the country to find work and opportunity abroad.

The continuation into the new century of the chaotic fallout from the collapse of the Soviet Union was symbolized for many in Dnipropetrovsk by two violent episodes. In June and July 2007, Dnipropetrovsk experienced a wave of random video-recorded serial killings that were dubbed by the media as the work of the "Dnipropetrovsk maniacs". In February 2009, three youths were sentenced for their part in 21 murders, and numerous other attacks and robberies. On 27 April 2012, four bombs exploded near four tram stations in Dnipropetrovsk, injuring 27 people. No one was convicted. Opposition politicians claimed to see the hand of President Viktor Yanukovych intent on disrupting the October 2012 Ukrainian parliamentary election and installing a presidential regime.

=== Euromaidan ===
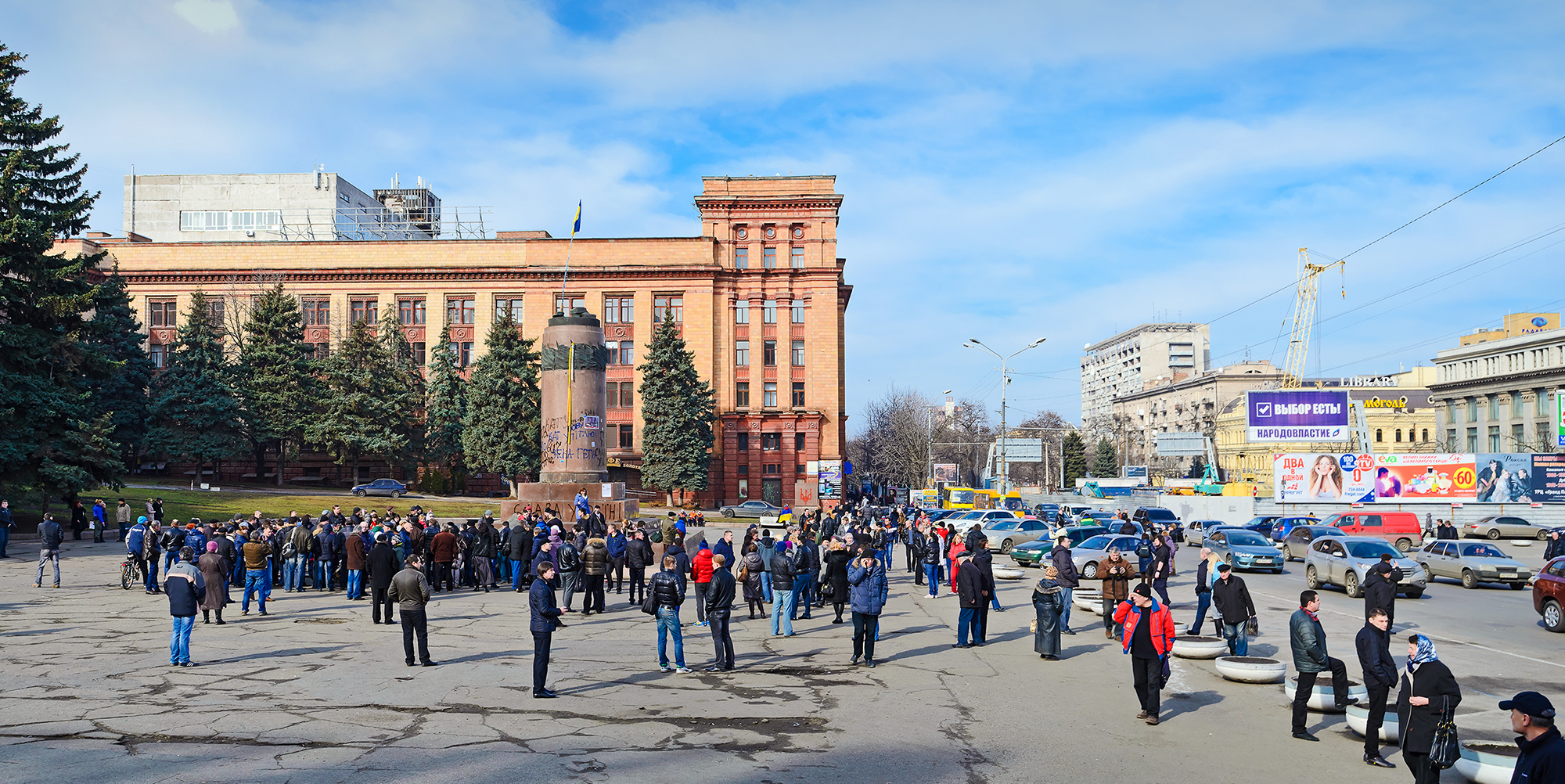
Lenin Square in Dnipropetrovsk on 22 February 2014 with the demolished monuments to Vladimir Lenin.

On 26 January 2014, 3,000 anti-Viktor Yanukovych (Ukrainian President) and pro-Euromaidan activists attempted but failed to capture the Regional State Administration building. There were street disturbances and Euromaidan protesters were reported to be beaten up by paid pro-Yanukovych supporters (the so-called Titushky). Dnipropetrovsk Governor Kolesnikov called them "extreme radical thugs from other regions".

Two days later about 2,000 public sector employees called an indefinite rally in support of the Yanukovych government. Meanwhile, the government building was reinforced with barbed wire. On 19 February 2014 there was an anti-Yanukovych picket near the Regional State Administration. On 22 February 2014, after a further anti-Yanukovych demonstration, Dnipropetrovsk Mayor Ivan Kulichenko, for the sake of "peace in the city" left Yanukovych's Party of Regions.

Simultaneously the Dnipropetrovsk City Council vowed to support "the preservation of Ukraine as a single and indivisible state", although some members had called for separatism and for federalization of Ukraine. On the same day, after street fighting in Kyiv, 22 February 2014, Yanukovych left Ukraine and went into Russian exile. Dnipro's local statue of Lenin was toppled by protesters the following day.

=== 2014 to 2022 ===
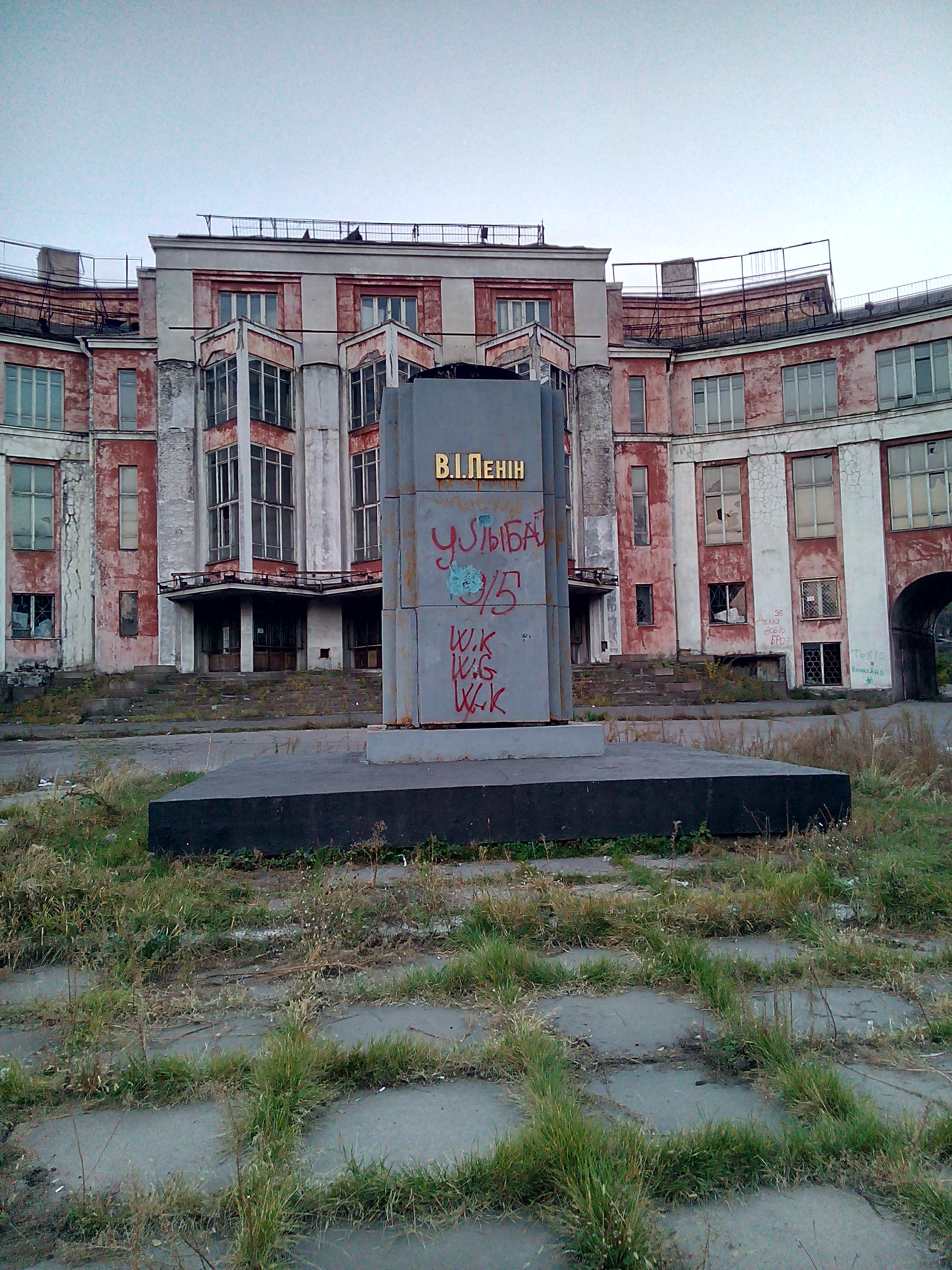
A destroyed monument to Vladimir Lenin on Dnipro's Kalinin Avenue (now Prospekt Serhiy Nigoyan) in October 2014.

Dnipropetrovsk remained relatively quiet during the 2014 pro-Russian unrest in Ukraine, with pro-Russian Federation protestors outnumbered by those opposing outside intervention. In March 2014 the city's Lenin Square was renamed "Heroes of Independence Square" in honor of the people killed during Euromaidan. The statue of Lenin had been toppled by protesters the previous month. In June 2014 another Lenin monument was removed and replaced by a monument to the Ukrainian military fighting the Russo-Ukrainian War.

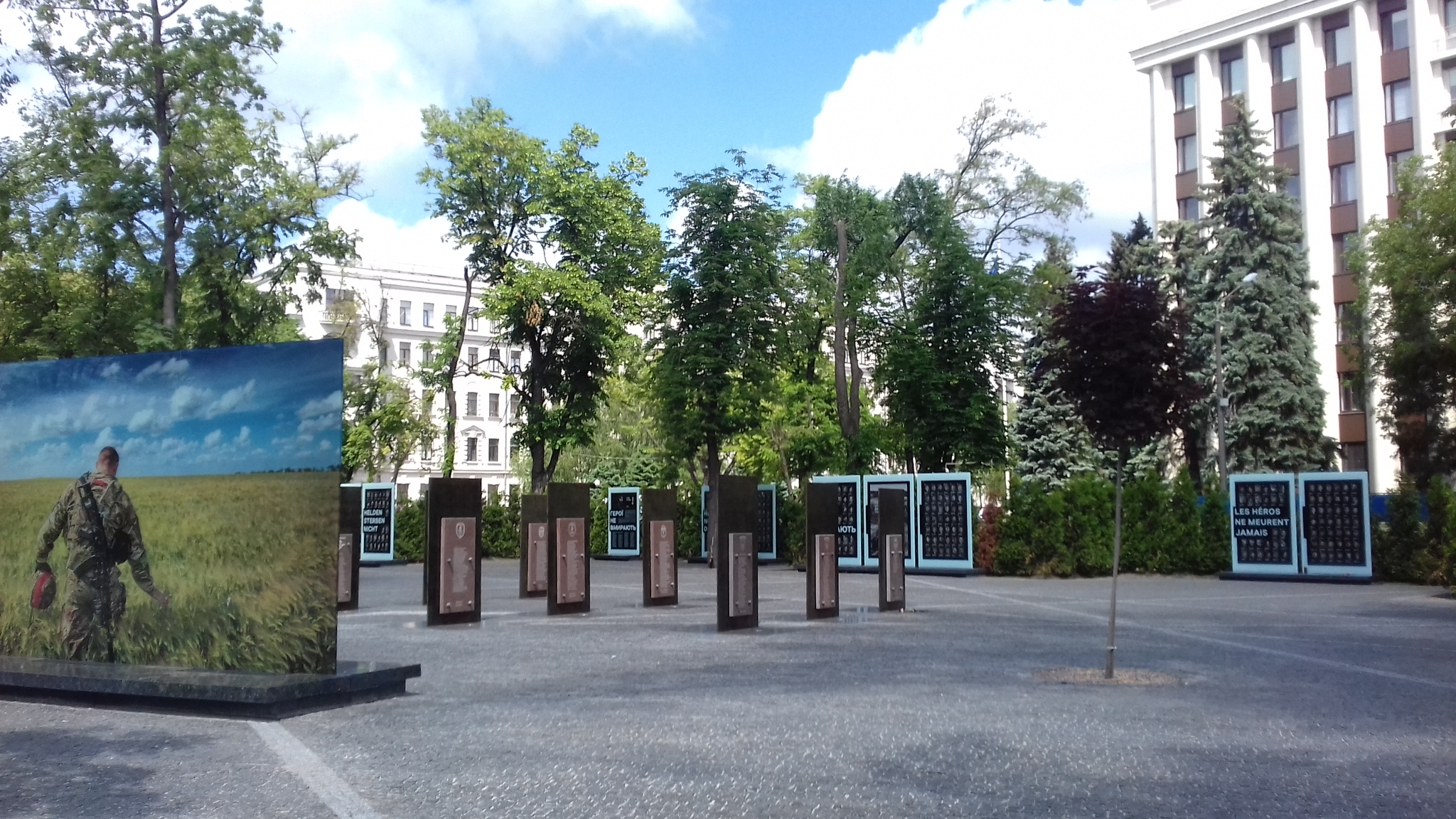
Memorial to the victims of the Russian-Ukrainian War (ATO zone) in Dnipro's city centre in 2018.

To comply with the 2015 decommunization law the city was renamed Dnipro in May 2016, after the river that flows through the city. By summer 2016 not only was the city was renamed, but so were more than 350 streets, alleys, driveways, squares and parks. For example, Karl Marx Avenue, the main street, was renamed Yavornytskyi Avenue in honour of the once neglected city and cossack historian. This was 12 percent of all of the city's toponymies. Five of the eight urban districts of the city received new names.

=== 2022 Russian invasion of Ukraine ===
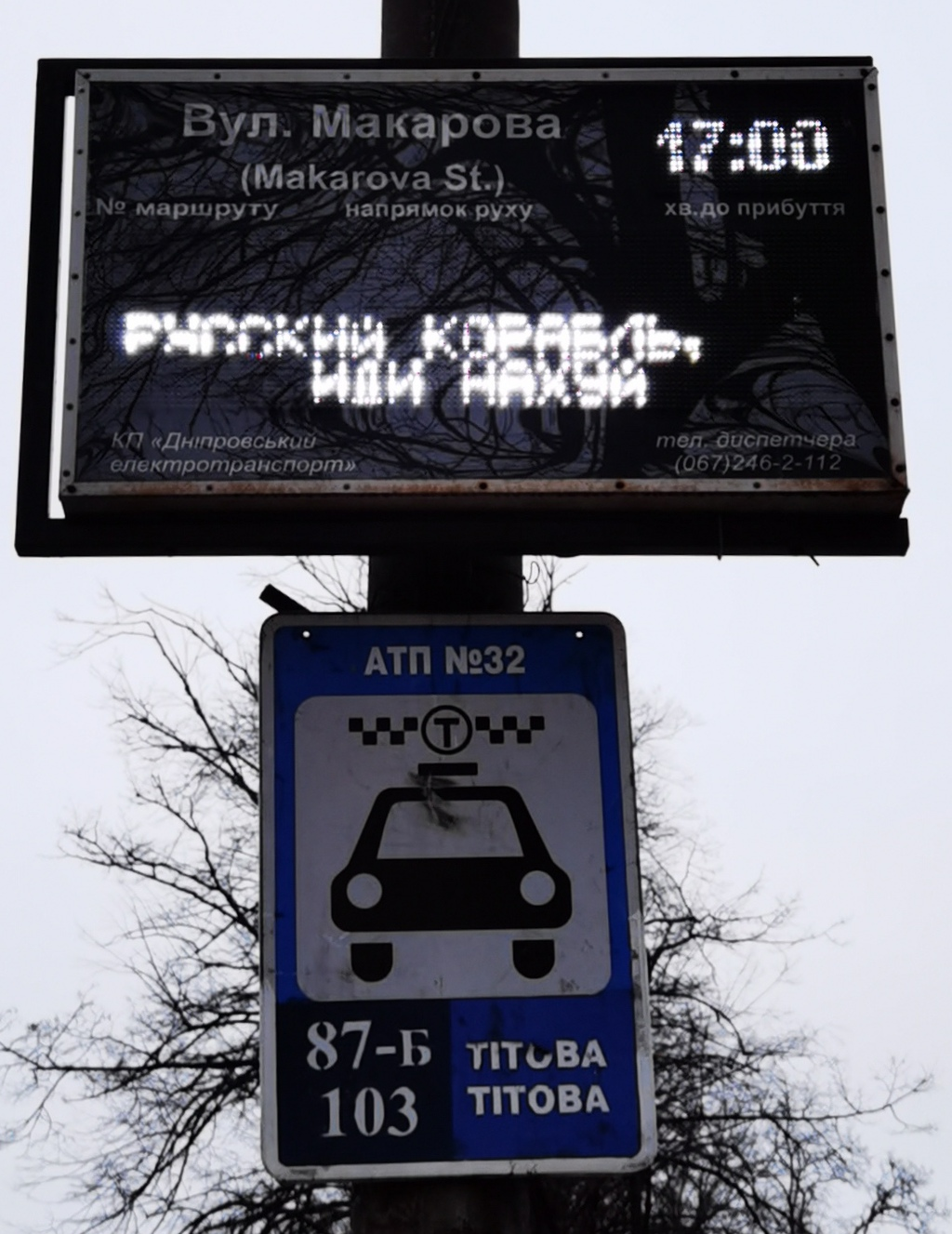
The slogan "Russian warship, go fuck yourself" displayed on a bus stop in Dnipro in February 2022.

In the wake of the 2022 Russian invasion of Ukraine on 24 February 2022, and with developing military fronts to the north, east and south, Dnipro has become a logistical hub for humanitarian aid and a reception point for people fleeing the war. Roughly equidistant from most of the war's major battlegrounds — Donetsk, Mariupol, Kherson and Kharkiv are all within 200 miles (320 km)— the city's location is proving critical for supplying the Ukrainian defence effort. At the same time, its control of a Dnieper River crossing and the opportunity it would provide to cut off Ukrainian forces in the Donbas makes the city a high-value target for the Russians.

Dnipro is reported as the only city in Ukraine where a volunteer formation has been created under direct City Council control. It is called the "Dnieper Guard" (Варти Дніпра, Varty Dnipra). The Mayor of Dnipro, Borys Filatov has dismissed suggestions that the group remained Ihor Kolomoyskyi's "private army". Kolomoyskyi has helped with some equipment purchases, but the force performs defence and law and order functions under the leadership of the national police.

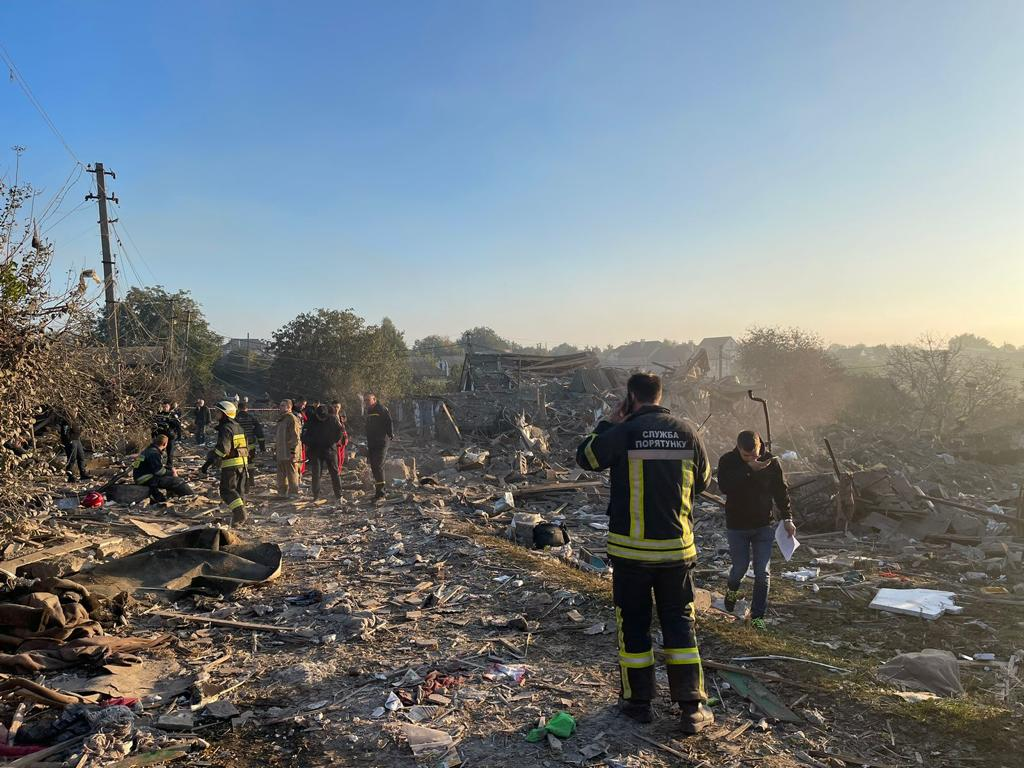
Dnipro city after Russian shelling in the night on 29 September 2022.

The Russians first hit Dnipro on 11 March. Three air strikes close to a kindergarten and an apartment building killed at least one person. On 15 March, Russian missiles hit Dnipro International Airport, destroying the runway and damaging the terminal. In the early hours of 6 April, an air strike destroyed an oil depot. On 10 April, a Ukrainian government spokesperson said that the airport in Dnipro had been "completely destroyed" as the result of a Russian attack. On 15 July, a Russian missile attack killed four people and injured sixteen others in Dnipro.

As part of the derussification campaign that swept through Ukraine following the February 2022 invasion 110 toponyms in the city were "de-Russified" from February to September 2022. The renaming started on 21 April when 31 streets connected to Russia were renamed. In May another 20 streets were renamed, followed by 21 more streets and alleys in June 2022. According to Dnipro's Mayor Borys Filatov (speaking on 21 September 2022) "this is not the end." Among other renamings, the Schmidt Street (the street was originally the Gymnasium Street but it was renamed to Otto Schmidt Street by Soviet authorities in 1934) in the center of Dnipro was renamed to Stepan Bandera Street. (Note: On 16 November 2022 Pushkin Avenue in the city center of Dnipro was renamed Lesya Ukrainka Avenue.) In May 2022 (also) several outdoor objects related to the USSR were dismantled in Dnipro. In December 2022 Dnipro removed from the city all monuments to figures of Russian culture and history. (Note: Monuments to Alexander Pushkin, Maxim Gorky, Valery Chkalov, Yefim Pushkin, Volodia Dubinin, Alexander Matrosov and Mikhail Lomonosov were removed from the public space of the city in December 2022.) On 22 February 2023 26 more streets were renamed. A monument to Soviet Ukrainian World War II Soviet partisan leader Oleksiy Fedorov was dismantled on 10 January 2023. (Note: On 15 August 2026 a monument to Soviet Airborne Forces general Vasily Margelov, that was installed in Dnipro (his place of birth) in the year 2000, was dismantled. It was reported that in its place a monument to Ukrainian paratroopers would be placed.)

Dnipro was hit during the autumn 2022 Russian missile strikes on critical infrastructure. On 10 October three civilians were killed. On 18 October 2022 Russian missile strikes targeted the energy infrastructure of Dnipro. On 17 November 2022 23 people were injured. The attacks continued in 2023. The most deadly of these attacks being the 14 January 2023 missile strike on an apartment building that killed 40 people, injured 75 and with 46 people reported missing.

On Saturday 29 April 2023, Czech President Petr Pavel together with Slovak President Zuzana Čaputová visited Dnipro, which had been the target of a Russian missile attack a day earlier. There he met with Serhiy Lysak, regional governor of the Dnipropetrovsk region, over whose restoration the Czech Republic has taken patronage. In Czech media this visit was labeled as the first foreign president to travel to eastern Ukraine since the Russian invasion began in February 2022.

As of December 2025 the Dnipro City Council is consulting with experts to set a new official year of the city's foundation; since they believed (that the then official year of founding) 1776 "is a myth of imperial Russia", and that the city existed many years before 1776. The Dnipro city council officially set 1526 as the date of the city's foundation in August 2026. (Previously 1776 was the official date of the foundation of Dnipro.) This year of foundation is based on the existence of the Stara Samar settlement on the territory of the modern Dnipro. (Note: Not all historians supported the new dating, as they considered the evidence insufficient to determine 1526 as the year of the city's foundation.)

On 7 November 2025 the Dnipro city council introduce a moratorium on the public use of Russian language cultural products "created or reproduced in Russian"; this moratorium was set to end only after "the complete end of the occupation of the territory of Ukraine."
