= Operation Kovel Uzel =

- Part of Eastern Front (World War II)
Date	7 June 1943 – 14 March 1944
Location	Kovel railway junction, Kovel, German-occupied Ukraine
Result	Soviet victory

Belligerents
Ukrainian partisans	Nazi Germany

Commanders and leaders
Oleksiy Fedorov	Unknown

Units involved
Chernihiv-Volhynian partisan organisation	Unknown

Casualties and losses
Unknown	549 echelons with ammunition, fuel, military equipment and manpower

Kovel Uzel - code name of the sabotage operation carried out by Soviet partisans from 7 June 1943 to 14 March 1944 in the area of Kovel railway junction.

== Purpose of the operation ==
The aim of the operation was to destroy the enemy's lines of communication and echelons, depriving the enemy of reinforcements.

== Operation results ==
From 7 July 1943 to 14 March 1944 the partisans under the command of Oleksiy Fedorov destroyed 549 enemy echelons with ammunition, fuel, military equipment and manpower on the lines of Kovel railway junction. Fedorov destroyed 549 enemy echelons with ammunition, fuel, military equipment and manpower on the lines of the Kovel railway junction.
