= Staryi Bridge =

Bridge crossing the Dnieper in Dnipro, Ukraine

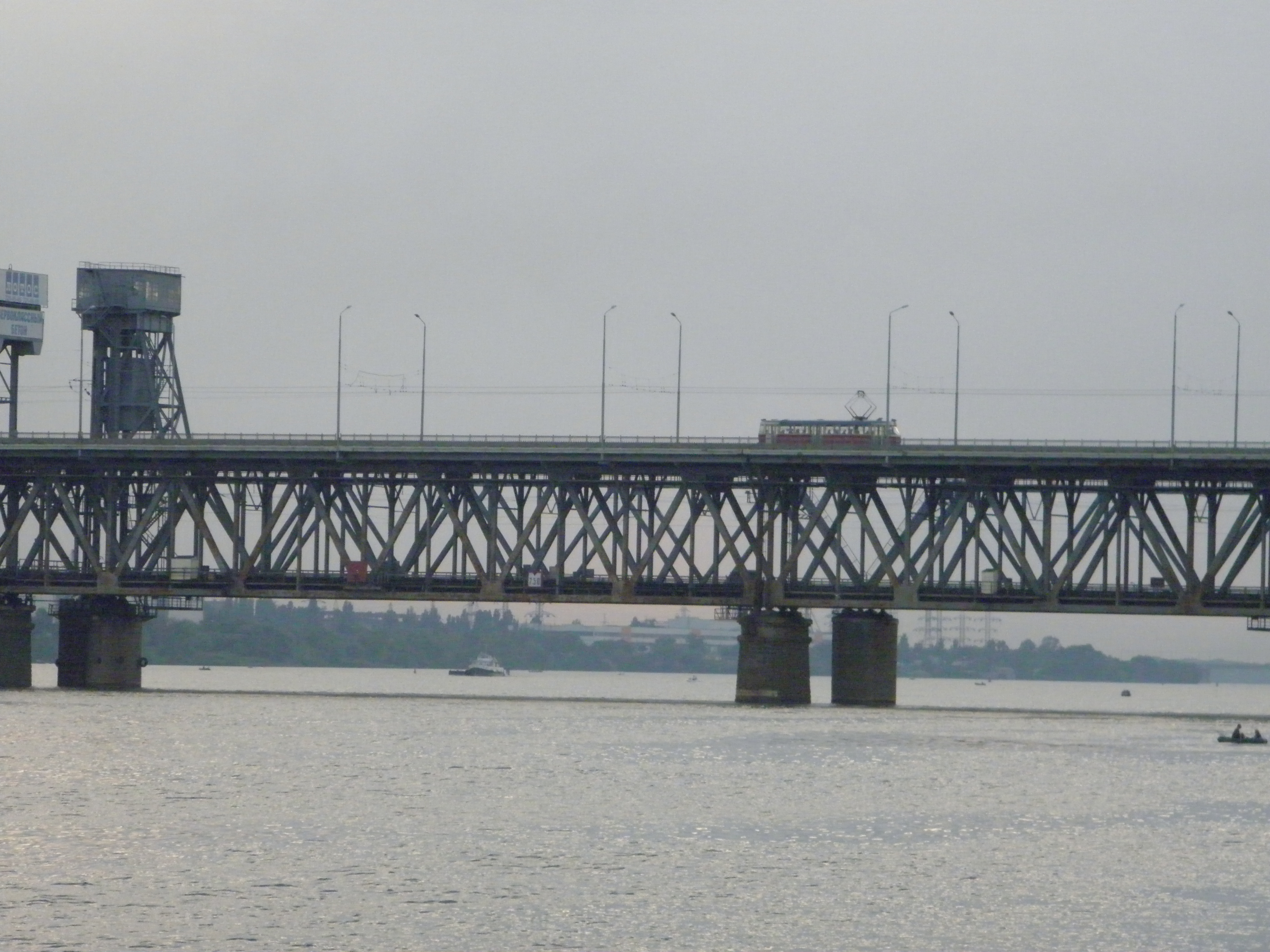
- Staryi Bridge
- Coordinates: 48°48′51″N 35°02′53″E
- Carries: Automobiles; Rail
- Crosses: Dnieper River
- Locale: Dnipro, Ukraine
- Official name: Staryi Bridge
- Other name: Old Bridge
- Owner: Ukraine

Characteristics
- Total length: ~1,300 m
- Width: 15.5 m

History
- Designer: Nikolai Belelubsky
- Construction start: 1881 / 1951
- Construction end: 1884 / 1955
- Inaugurated: May 18, 1884

Location
- Interactive map of Staryi Bridge

The Staryi Bridge (Ukrainian: Старий міст, lit. 'Old Bridge'), formerly known as Amurskyi Bridge (Ukrainian: Амурський міст), is a combined double-decker (road and rail) bridge across the Dnieper River in the city of Dnipro.

== History ==
Nikolai Belelubsky designed the bridge and began construction in 1881. The bridge was first opened on May 18, 1884, to service rail and pedestrian traffic across the Dnieper river. At the time of its opening, it was one of the longest bridges in the Russia Empire. The bridge was reinforced in 1914 following the outbreak of the First World War. The bridge was destroyed in 1919 during the Russian Civil War by the Revolutionary Insurgent Army of Ukraine in their attempt to capture the city. The bridge was bombed and destroyed by the Wehrmacht in 1941 during the Second World War. Retreating Red Army soldiers were forced to use a pontoon bridge to cross the river. In 1943, a temporary wooden structure would be built and used until the original bridge was fully restored by December 1955. In 1977, a second railway bridge was built next to the original due to increased volume of traffic using the bridge.

On 29 July 2024, the bridge was renamed to comply with derussification laws, and thus its old name was returned.

== Location ==
It connects the Tsentralnyi (Central) and Amur-Nyzhniodniprovskyi districts of Dnipro.
