= Coat of arms of Dnipro =

Versions
- Armiger: Dnipro
- Adopted: 6 September 2001

The coat of arms of Dnipro is the official heraldic symbol of the city of Dnipro, Ukraine. It was adopted by decision No. 2/22 of the city council (23rd convocation) on 6 September 2001.

== Description ==
The coat of arms consists of a shield of Slavic form (rounded at the base). This shape is common in contemporary Ukrainian heraldry and is recommended by the Ukrainian Heraldry Society.

The field of the shield is blue (azure). In heraldry, blue conventionally represents glory, honour, and fidelity. In the coat of arms of Dnipro, this colour carries multiple meanings.

First, it represents the waters of the Dnieper River, which flows through the city. Second, blue is one of the colours of the State Coat of Arms and the State Flag of Ukraine, reflecting the city's connection to national symbols. Third, there is historical precedent: blue was the colour of the coat of arms of Yekaterinoslav (the city's former name) and is traditional in Cossack symbolism.

In the upper portion of the shield are three seven-pointed silver stars. In heraldry, stars symbolise high aspirations and enduring ideals, associated with the motto "Ad astra!" ("To the stars!").

The seven-pointed stars derive from the seal of the Kodak palanka of the Zaporozhian Host, reflecting the city's Cossack heritage. The number three represents:

- the connection of past, present, and future;
- the three geographical parts of the city, divided by the Dnieper and Samara rivers: the right bank, left bank, and Prydniprovskyi residential area.

The stars also symbolise sparks of molten metal, representing metallurgy, the industry that transformed the city from a small provincial town into a major industrial centre in the late 19th and early 20th centuries. Additionally, the stars represent space and the universe, reflecting the city's rocket industry, which developed extensively in the 20th century and established Dnipro as Ukraine's space capital.

The stars are arranged in the form of the Latin letter "V", signifying "victoria" (victory).

The central element of the coat of arms consists of a crossed silver sabre and arrow. This combination has historical roots in Cossack symbolism and appeared on the seal of the Kodak palanka. As a contemporary symbol, the arrow represents movement and aspiration, while also referencing the aerospace industry. The sabre is a traditional symbol of defence and strength.

The stars, sabre, and arrow are rendered in silver (argent), which in heraldry signifies purity, perfection, wisdom, and goodwill.

The cartouche of the coat of arms consists of oak leaves bound by four ribbons of different colours. Golden oak leaves traditionally symbolise mature strength, courage, and valour. The four ribbons represent different historical periods: crimson for the Cossack era, blue for the Yekaterinoslav period, and yellow-blue for the modern era.

Above the shield is a tower (mural crown), which signifies municipal status and the city's historical strategic importance as a frontier outpost.

== See also ==
- Dnipro's official flag
- Dnipro

== Sources ==
- Dnipro City Council
- Dnipro city website gorod.dp.ua
