= Yekaterinoslav electoral district =

Yekaterinoslav
- Former Civilian constituency for the All-Russian Constituent Assembly
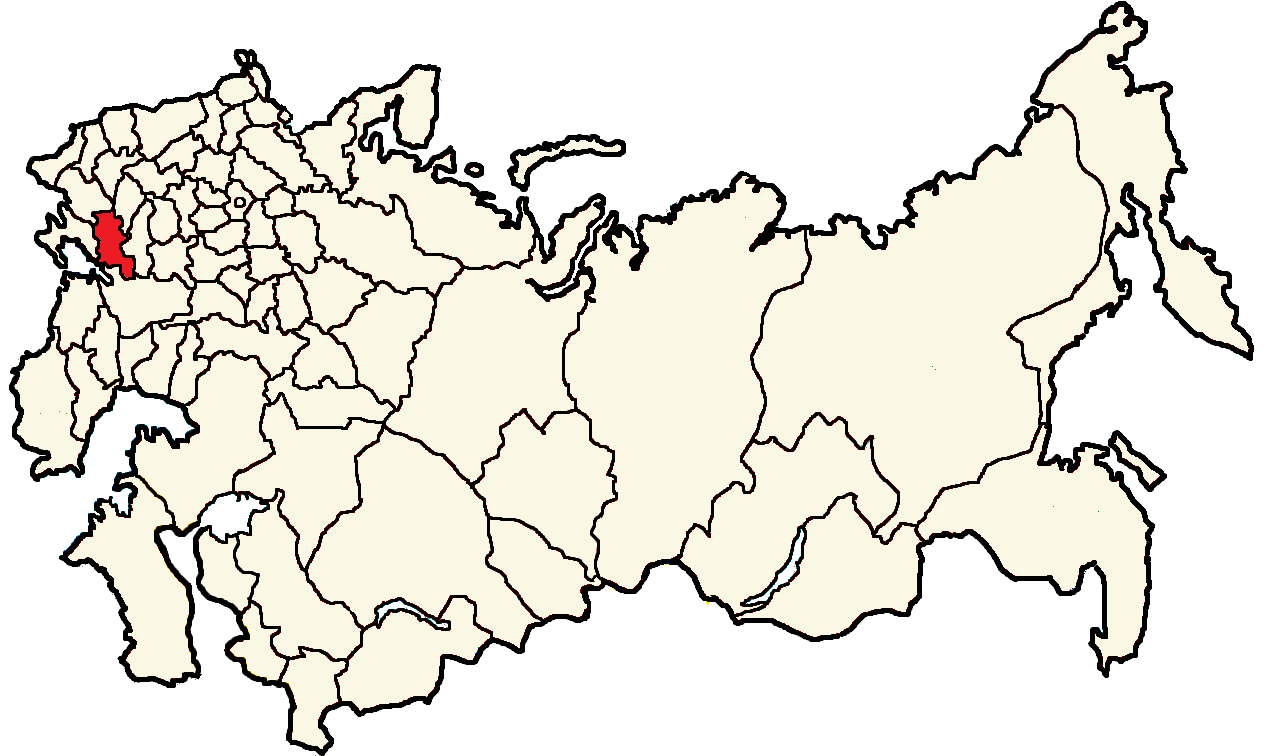

Former constituency
- Created: 1917
- Abolished: 1918
- Number of members: 18
- Number of Uyezd Electoral Commissions: 8
- Number of Urban Electoral Commissions: 5
- Number of Parishes: 238

The Yekaterinoslav electoral district (Russian: Екатеринославский избирательный округ) was a constituency created for the 1917 Russian Constituent Assembly election.

The electoral district covered the Yekaterinoslav Governorate. Yekaterinoslav was a large province; ethnically and economically diverse. The Yekaterinoslav electoral district recorded the highest vote for a landowners list in the country. List 1, Landowners and Nonpartisan Progressives, gathered 26,597 votes (2.2%), and was headed by Mikhail Rodzianko (an Octobrist leader, having served as the presiding officer in the 3rd and 4th Dumas, elected on the Stolypin franchise). Joseph Stalin stood as a candidate on the Bolshevik list. The conservative press reported a quiet and orderly election in the province.

Out of the ten deputies elected from List 5, nine belonged to the Ukrainian Socialist-Revolutionary Party and one belonged to the Ukrainian Social Democratic Labour Party.

== Results ==
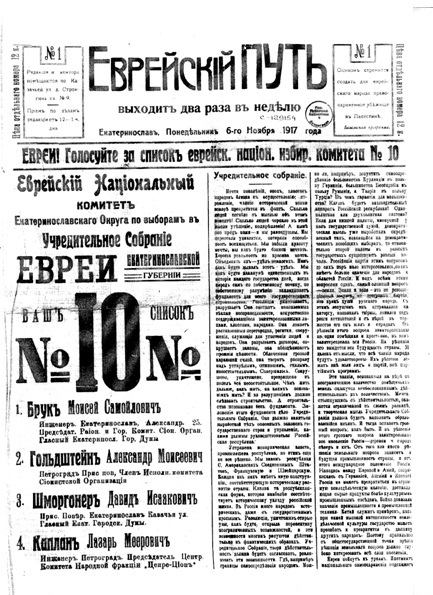
Evreisky Put' ('Jewish Path') newspaper, calling for a vote for List 10

Ekaterinoslav
Party	Vote	%	Seats
List 5 - Bloc of Ukrainian Socialist-Revolutionaries, Selyanska Spilka, Soviet of Peasant Deputies, Ukrainian Soc.-Dem. Labour Party	556,012	46.60	10
List 3 - Socialist-Revolutionaries	231,717	19.42	4
List 9 - Bolsheviks, Bakhmut Soviet of Peasants Deputies	213,163	17.87	4
List 10 - Jewish National Electoral Committee	37,032	3.10	
List 7 - Kadets	27,551	2.31	
List 12 - Mensheviks	26,909	2.26	
List 1 - Landowners and Nonpartisan Progressives	26,597	2.23	
List 14 - Russian Citizens of German Nationality	25,977	2.18	
List 4 - Popular Socialists-Cooperative alliance	9,496	0.80	
List 13 - Greek Settlement of Mariupol uezd	9,143	0.77	
List 6 - Orthodox-Farmers alliance	8,068	0.68	
List 15 - Unity	7,363	0.62	
List 2 - United Jewish Socialist Labour Party (S.S. and E.S.)	5,831	0.49	
List 11 - Bund	4,883	0.41	
List 8 - Poalei Zion	3,307	0.28	
Total:	1,193,049		18

Deputies Elected
Gvozdikovsky	SR
Popov	SR
Rosenblum	SR
Socheva	SR
Bachinsky	Ukrainian SR
Karpenko	Ukrainian SR
Korzh	Ukrainian SR
Mitsyuk	Ukrainian SR
Radomsky	Ukrainian SR
Romanenko	Ukrainian SR
Rosin	Ukrainian SR
Storubel	Ukrainian SR
Stromenko	Ukrainian SR
Surgae	Ukrainian SR
Averin	Bolshevik
Lutovinov	Bolshevik
Petrovsky	Bolshevik
Voroshilov	Bolshevik

In Yekaterinoslav town the Bolshevik list won the election, obtaining 20,849 votes (26.4%), followed by the Jewish National Electoral Committee 14,521 votes (18.3%), the Ukrainian socialist bloc 12,950 votes (16.4%), Kadets 9,224 votes (11.7%), SRs 6,627 votes (8.4%), Mensheviks 4,601 votes (5.8%), Landowners 3,608 votes (4.5%), the United Jewish Socialist Labour Party 1,781 votes (2.3%), Bund 1,545 votes (1.9%), Cooperative-Popular Socialists 1,007 votes (1.3%), Poalei-Zion 624 votes (0.8%), Unity 607 votes (0.8%), Germans 533 votes (0.7%), Orthodox-Farmers list 531 votes (0.7%) and Greeks 43 votes. The Ukrainian list dominated the vote in the Yekaterinoslav garrison, obtaining 3,770 votes (41.9%), followed by the Bolsheviks with 1,756 votes (19.5%), SRs 1,415 votes (15.7%), Jewish National Electoral Committee 720 votes (8%), Landowners 461 votes (5.1%), Kadets 301 votes (3.3%), Mensheviks 286 votes (3.2%), Popular Socialists-Cooperative 100 votes (1.1%), Unity 59 votes (0.7%), United Jewish Socialist Labour Party 56 votes (0.7%), Germans 49 votes (0.5%) and Orthodox-Farmer list 33 votes (0.4%).

== Ballots ==
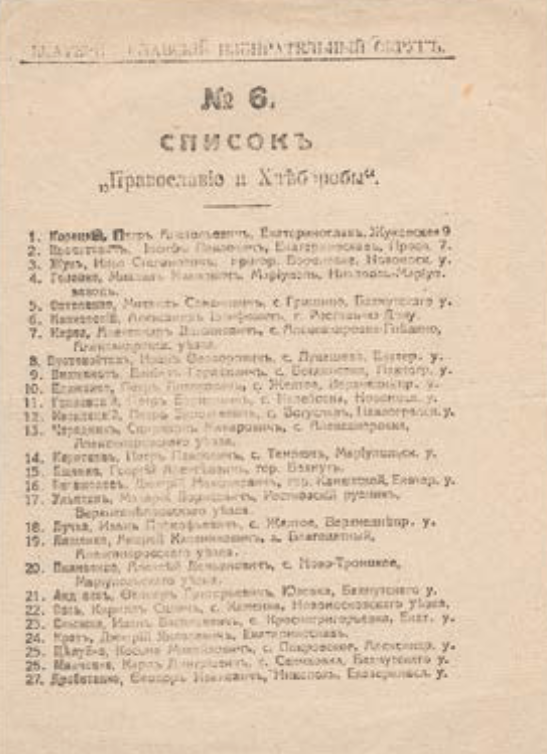
List 6 - Orthodox-Farmers

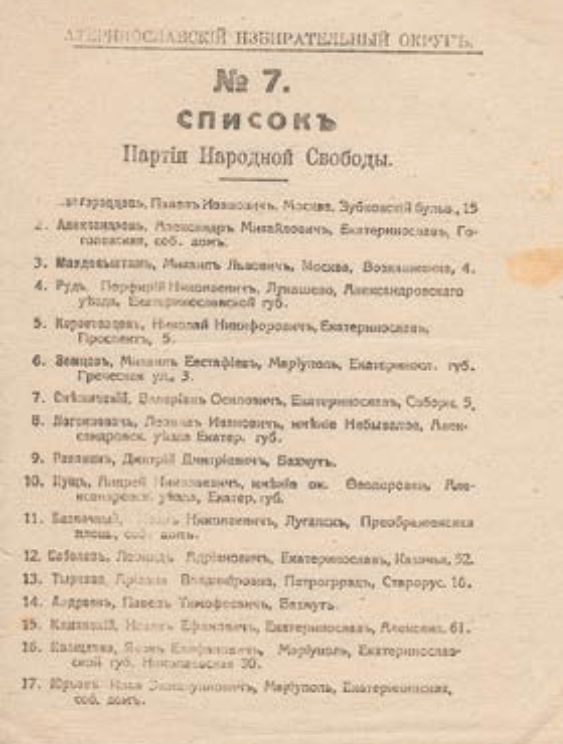
List 7 - Kadets

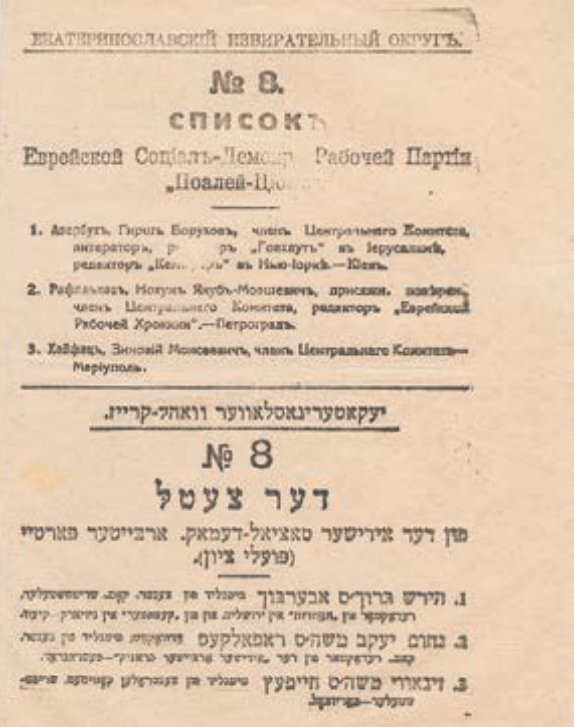
List 8 - Jewish Social Democratic Labour Party (Poalei Zion)

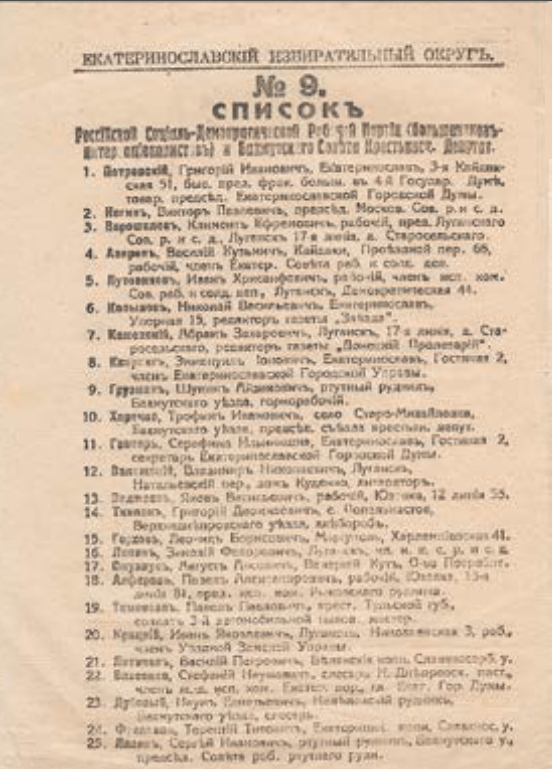
List 9 - Russian Social Democratic Labour Party (Bolsheviks-Internationalists) and the Bakhmut Soviet of Peasants Deputies

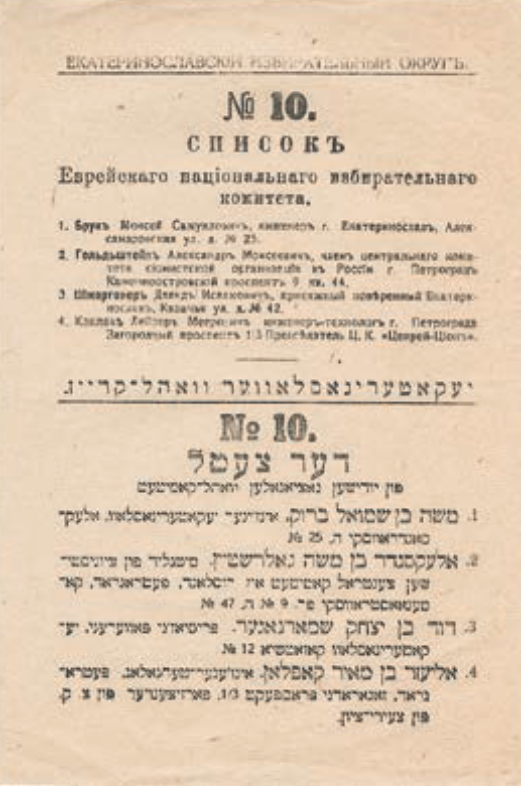
List 10 - Jewish National Electoral Committee

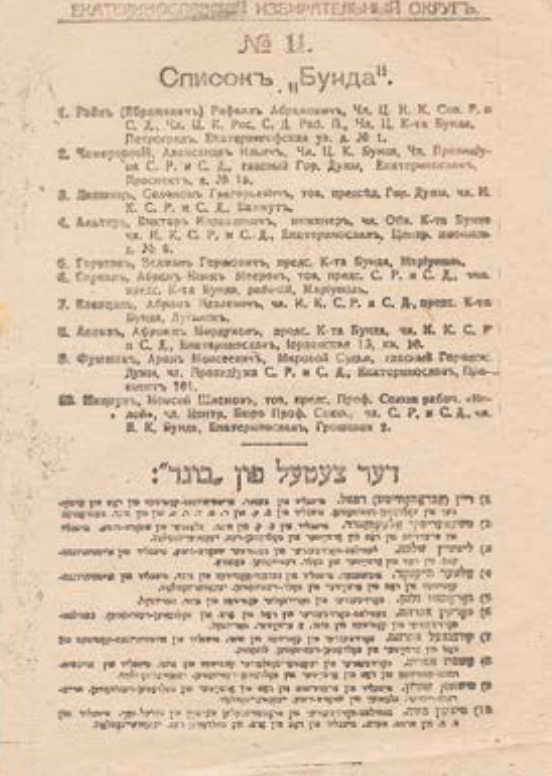
List 11 - Bund

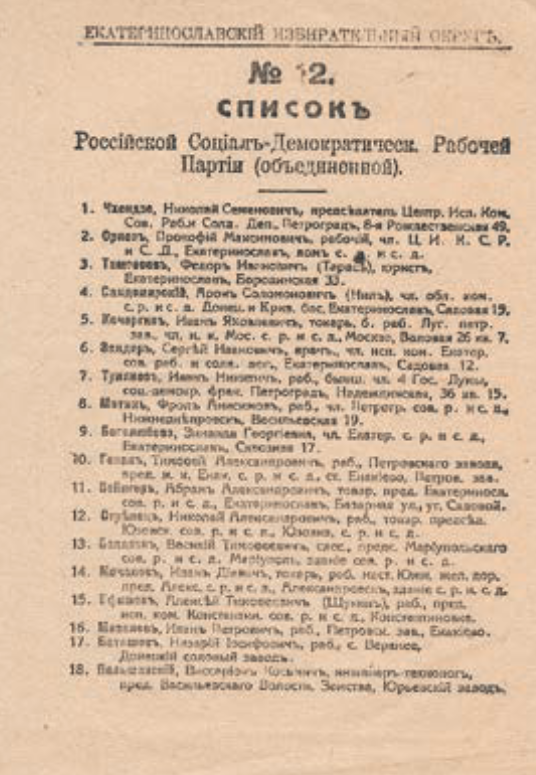
List 12 - Mensheviks

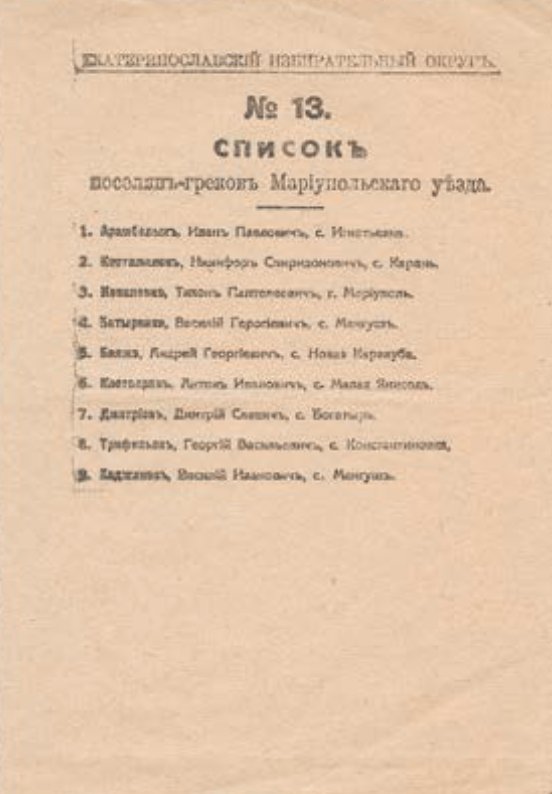
List 13 - Greek settlement of Mariupol uezd
