= Oleksiy Fedorov =

Soviet Ukrainian resistance leader (1901–1989)

- Born: 30 March 1901; Lotsmanska Kamianka, Yekaterinoslav Governorate, Russian Empire (now part of Dnipro, Ukraine)
- Died: 9 September 1989 (aged 88); Kyiv, Ukrainian SSR, Soviet Union
- Military career
- Allegiance: Soviet Union
- Service years: 1941–1944
- Rank: Major General
- Conflicts: Hero of the Soviet Union (twice)

Oleksiy Fedorovych Fedorov (Ukrainian: Олексій Федорович Федоров, Russian: Алексей Фёдорович Фёдоров, Aleksey Fyodorovich Fyodorov; 30 March 1901 – 9 September 1989), was a Ukrainian leader of Soviet partisan movement during World War II. He was twice awarded the title Hero of the Soviet Union, making him one of the only two partisan leaders to receive the title twice (the other being fellow Ukrainian Sydir Kovpak).

== Biography ==
Oleksiy Fedorov was born in Lotsmanska Kamianka (today part of Dnipro) in a Ukrainian peasant family. In 1920 he joined the Red Army and fought in the Russian Civil War.

In 1927 he joined Communist Party of the Soviet Union and by 1938 became a first secretary of the regional party committee in Chernihiv Oblast.

After the Nazi Germany invasion of the Soviet Union, Fedorov became a prominent organizer of the underground resistance in occupied Ukraine. Since September 1941 worked as the first secretary of the Chernigov partisan unit which by March 1942 had sixteen engagements with the enemy and killed over a thousand German troops. And from March 1943 also Volyn underground regional party committees, at the same time commander of the Chernigov-Volyn partisan unit of the NKVD of the USSR. In May 1942 Oleksiy Fedorov was awarded a title Hero of the Soviet Union and the Order of Lenin with a golden star. During the spring and summer of 1943 Fedorov's partisan units expanded guerrilla activities into other occupied regions of USSR outside north-east Ukraine including the Volyn, Belarus, Bryansk and Oryol regions. These years revealed the talent of Alexei Fedorov as an outstanding organizer of guerrilla warfare, one of the creators of guerrilla tactics. In April 1943, A.F.Fedorov was promoted to the military rank of "Major General". Fedorov, in addition to leading the fighting, carried out extensive work on the establishment of party organizations in the occupied territories and the mobilization of Soviet citizens to fight the Nazi invaders.

During the period of the compound's stay in Volyn, the underground regional committee created 11 underground district party committees, 28 anti-fascist groups, 9 underground district Komsomol committees and 61 primary Komsomol organizations.

Until the last days, up to the liberation of the Volyn region by the Red Army, the partisans under the command of Fedorov did not stop fighting. On their account 158 significant battles with the enemy.

Under his leadership partisan detachments turned into a compound that carried out important combat operations to destroy enemy manpower and equipment. The commissar of his unit was Hero of the Soviet Union Vladimir Druzhynin. During the legendary Kovel railway hub operation in the autumn of 1943 and the following winter, the partisans of Fedorov liquidated over 500 German supply trains full of ammunition, fuel, military equipment and army personnel.

Partisan forces under his command committed at least one massacre of alleged collaborators. They annihilated the village of Liakhovychi in response to what they believed was collaboration. An eyewitness recounted that they 'killed everyone they spotted', including women, children and whole families.

In January 1944, Oleksiy Fedorov was awarded a second Gold Star medal.

== Civilian life ==
After the liberation of Ukraine, Oleksiy Fedorov headed Communist party committees in several Ukrainian regions including Kherson (1944–1949) Izmail (1950–1952) and Zhytomyr (1952–1957) oblasts. In 1957 he became a Minister of Welfare in the government of Ukrainian SSR and until 1979 he served as a deputy of the Supreme Soviet of the USSR. Fyodorov wrote a book of his war experiences. A translation was published in English as "The Underground Committee Carries On". The picture of A. Fyodorov on the frontispiece matches his picture found here.

Oleksiy Fedorov died on September 9, 1989, in Kyiv.

== Legacy ==
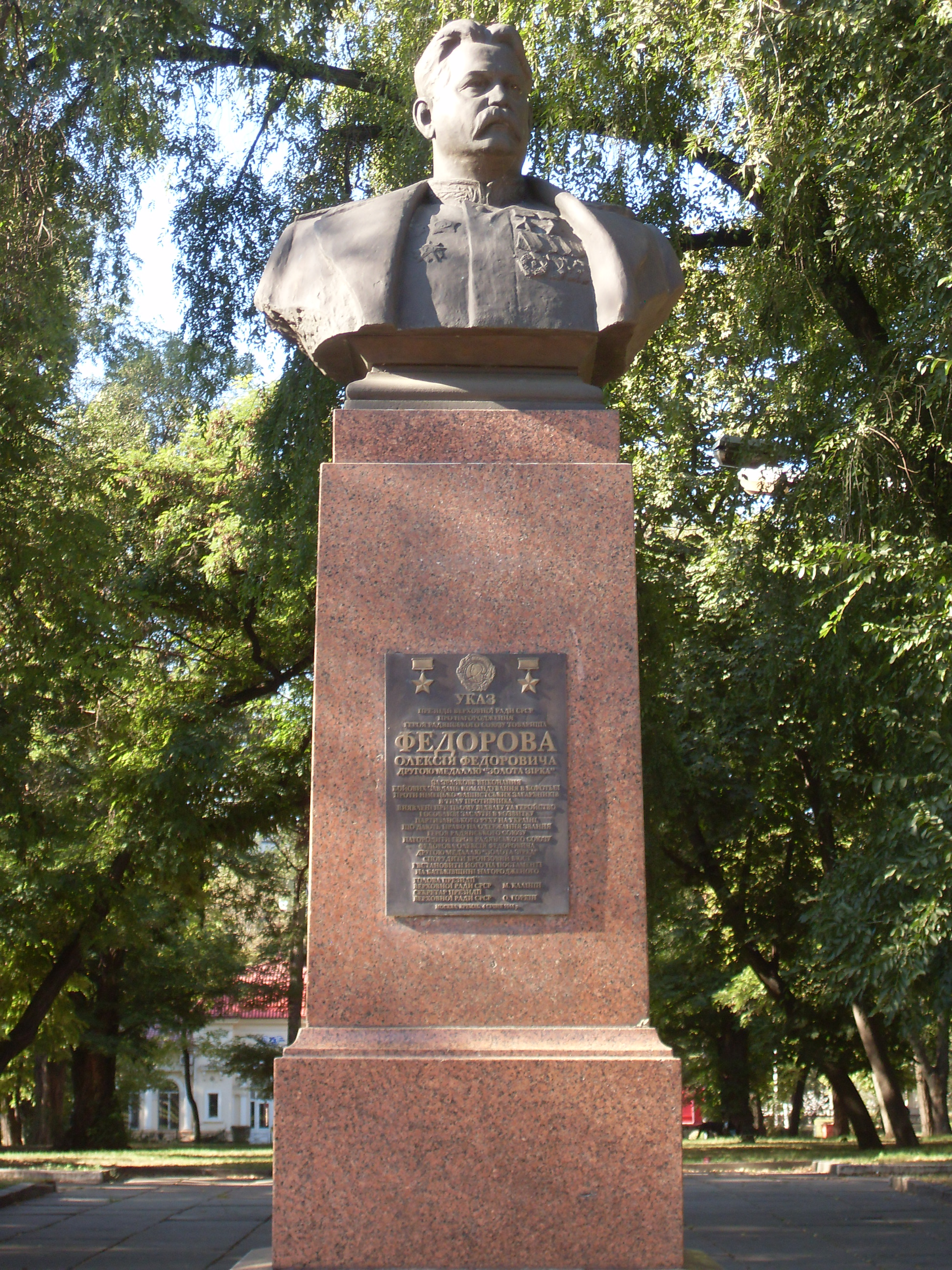
Busts of Alexei Fyodorov in Dnipropetrovsk in 2015

A monument was built to Fedorov in his native Dnipropetrovsk (present day Dnipro). On January 10, 2023, the bust of Fedorov was dismantled by the Dnipro city authorities. This was part of the derussification campaign that swept through Ukraine and Dnipro following the February 2022 Russian invasion of Ukraine.

The Kyiv City Council stripped the title of "Honorary Citizen of the City of Kyiv" from Fedorov on 26 May 2023. It stated it did so in accordance with Ukrainian decommunization laws.

== Awards ==
- Twice Hero of the Soviet Union (1942 and 1944)
- Six Orders of Lenin (1939, 1942, 1961, 1981)
- Order of Suvorov 1st class (1945)
- Order of Bogdan Khmelnitsky 1st class (1944)
- Order of the Red Banner
- Order of the Patriotic War 1st class (1945)
- Order of the Patriotic War 2nd class (1945)
- Order of the Red Star
- Order of the October Revolution
- Order of the Red Banner of Labour
- Medal "Partisan of the Patriotic War" 1st class
- Medal "For the Victory over Germany in the Great Patriotic War 1941–1945"
