= Flag of Dnipro =

Dnipro Flag

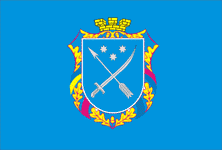
Flag of Dnipro adopted in 2001

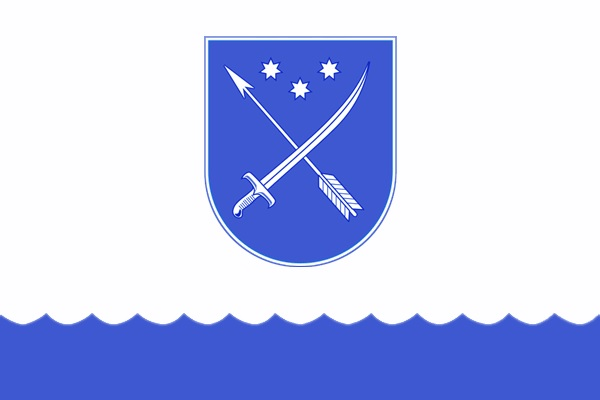
Flag of Dnipropetrovsk (now Dnipro) in use until December 2012

The municipal flag of Dnipro was first adopted in December 2001 following a competition organised by the city council of Dnipro. Ten designs reached the final stage of the competition; the winning entry was designed by S. S. Poliushkin.

The flag's design was subsequently modified: the field became white with stylised waves representing the Dnieper River in the lower portion, and the coat of arms in the centre was simplified.

== 2012 competition ==
On 18 April 2012, the mayor issued decree No. 212-r announcing a competition for a new city flag design. The new flag of Dnipro was adopted on 5 December 2012 at a regular session of the city council.

The blue colour depicts waves of the Dnieper River, a prominent symbol of the city. The coat of arms, as the official emblem, occupies the centre of the flag. The white field symbolises purity of intent and the city's future.
