= List of crossings of the Dnieper =

This is a list of all current crossings of the river Dnieper (or Dnipro) from its source in Russia, through Belarus, to its river delta near the Dnieper Estuary at Kherson, Ukraine.

== Russia ==
| Photograph | Name | Location | Type | Constructed |
|---|---|---|---|---|
| | — | Bocharovo | Pedestrian | |
| | — | Domashenka - Bolshevo | Road | 2010s |
| | — | Domashenka - Bolshevo | Pedestrian | 2010s |
| | — | Domashenka - Bolshevo | Pedestrian | |
| | — | Dniprovske - Neronovo | Road | 2014 |
| | — | Dniprovske - Neronovo | Road | |
| | — | Honyuki - Sleptsovo | Pedestrian | |
| | — | Anosovo - Anosovo Flax Plant | Road | |
| Міст у Нахімовському | — | Nakhimovske - Gerasimovo | Road | |
| | — | Glushkovo - Fedurkino | Road | |
| | — | Kazarinovo - Village | Road | |
| | — | Prudky - Nadezhda | Road | 2004 |
| | — | Prudky - Nadezhda | Road | 1937 |
| | — | Nikulino - Zabelino | Rail | |
| Висячий міст | — | Martinkovo — Verkhnedneprovsky | Pedestrian | |
| | — | Polybino - Elysee | Road | |
| | | Dorogobuzh - Ivonino (bypass road) | Road | 1997 |
| | | Dorogobuzh | Road | Before 1930 |
| | Nightingale crossing | Korovniki - Solovyov | Road | 1970 |
| | — | Yerdytsia - Prydniprovska | Rail | |
| | — | Barracks 368 km - Falcon Mountain | Rail | |
| | — | High - Falcon Mountain (Smolensk bypass) | Road | 1980s |
| Міст по вул. Степана Разіна | Stepan Razin Street Bridge ("Exaltation of the Cross") | Smolensk | Road | 1978 |
| Дніпровський міст | Dnieper Bridge | Smolensk | Road | 1961 |
| Пішохідний міст | | Smolensk | Pedestrian | 2013 |
| Міст по вул. Дзержинського | Dzerzhinsky Street Bridge | Smolensk | Road | 1898—1941/ 1960 |
| Гньоздовський міст | Gniezno Bridge | Demidovka—Smolensk | Road | |
| | — | Miganovo — Gusino | Road | 1966 |

== Belarus ==
| Photograph | Name | Location | Type | Constructed |
|---|---|---|---|---|
| Russia-Belarus border - Source of the Dnieper in Belarus | | | | |
| | — | Dubroŭna | Road | 1960s/2009 |
| | M1 highway Vorša bypass | Pašyna - Prydniaproŭje | Road | 1981 |
| | Mahilioŭ Street Bridge | Vorša | Road | 1957 |
| | Juryja Babkova Street Bridge | Vorša | Road | |
| | — | Vorša | Rail | — |
| | — | Kopys — Alieksandryja (Škloŭ Raion) | Road | 2007 |
| | — | Škloŭ | Road | 1962 |
| | Mahilioŭ bypass | Paŭlaŭka - Palykavičy | Road | 1997 |
| | — | Mahilioŭ | Rail | 1936 |
| | Karaliova Street Bridge | Mahilioŭ | Road | 1996 |
| | Puškinski praspiekt Bridge | Mahilioŭ | Road | 1959 |
| | praspiekt Šmita Bridge | Mahilioŭ | Road | 1967 |
| | — | Varanino — Bykhaŭ | Road | 1964 |
| | — | Rahačoŭ | Road | 1959 |
| | Žłobin bypass | Aliaksandraŭka - Liebiadzioŭka | Road | 2014 |
| | — | Aliaksandraŭka - Liebiadzioŭka | Road | 1970s |
| | — | Žłobin | Rail | |
| | — | Kalybaŭka — Žłobin | Rail | |
| | — | Siannaja - Rečyca | Rail | |
| | — | Dunaj - Haroškaŭ | Road | 1958 |
| | — | Dunaj - Haroškaŭ | Road | 1988 |

== Ukraine ==
| Image | Crossing | Carries | Location | Constructed | Coordinates |
=== Upper stream (Chernihiv, Kyiv oblasts and Kyiv city) ===
| Belarus-Ukraine border - Source of the Dnipro in Ukraine | | | | | 51.947°N 30.8051°E |
| | Nedanchychi Rail Bridge | Railroad special purpose | Belarus-Ukraine border segment near Slavutych | 1930 | 51.4998°N 30.5848°E |
| | Slavutych–Kamaryn border crossing | Regional roads P56/R35 | Belarus-Ukraine border segment near Slavutych | 1987 or later | 51.3943°N 30.6411°E |
| | Kyiv Hydroelectric Power Plant | Regional road P69 | Vyshhorod, Kyiv Oblast | 1964 | 50.5895°N 30.5067°E |
| | Pivnichnyi Bridge (Northern) | prospekts Stepana Bandery/Romana Shukhevycha | Kyiv | 3 December 1976 | 50.4909°N 30.5368°E |
| | Rybalskyi Rail Bridge | Railroad Southwestern Railways | Kyiv | 9 November 1929 | 50.4838°N 30.5424°E |
| Подільський міст | Podilsko-Voskresenskyi Bridge | Road and Metro | Kyiv | 1 December 2024 | 50.4728°N 30.535°E |
| | Havanskyi Bridge | Naberezhno-Rybalska vulytsia | Kyiv | | 50.4691°N 30.5271°E |
| Парковий (пішохідний) міст | Rybalskyi Bridge | pedestrian (closed) | Kyiv | 3 July 1957 | 50.4733°N 30.523°E |
| | Parkovyi Bridge | pedestrian | Kyiv | | 50.4568°N 30.5342°E |
| | Kyiv Metro Bridge / Rusanivskyi Bridge | Kyiv Metro line / Brovarskyi prospekt | Kyiv | 5 November 1965 | 50.4568°N 30.5342°E |
| | Venetsiansky Bridge | pedestrian | Kyiv | | 50.4484°N 30.5753°E |
| Rusanivka Channel Bridge, South | Rusanivka Channel Bridge, North / Rusanivka Channel Bridge, South | Rusanivska Naberezhna | Kyiv | | 50.4464°N 30.591°E / 50.4324°N 30.5927°E |
| Rusanivka Channel Bridge, Side | Rusanivka Channel Bridge, Side | pedestrian traffic, vehicle traffic | Kyiv | | 50.4397°N 30.6083°E |
| | Rusanivka Channel Bridge, pedestrian north | pedestrian | Kyiv | | 50.444°N 30.5991°E |
| | Rusanivka Channel Bridge, pedestrian south | pedestrian | Kyiv | | 50.4345°N 30.6°E |
| | Paton Bridge | E95 | Kyiv | 5 November 1953 | 50.4277°N 30.5834°E |
| | Darnytsia Rail Bridge | Railroad Southwestern Railways | Kyiv | 1949 | 50.4173°N 30.5902°E |
| | New Darnytskyi Bridge | Railroad Southwestern Railways / Kyiv Metro / Darnytske shose | Kyiv | 27 September 2010 | 50.4169°N 30.5904°E |
| Південний міст | Pivdennyi Bridge (Southern) | E40 and Kiev Metro line 3 | Kyiv | 25 December 1990 | 50.3947°N 30.5931°E |
=== Mid stream (Cherkasy, Kirovohrad, Poltava and Dnipropetrovsk oblasts) ===
| | Kaniv Hydroelectric Power Plant | H02/ railroad special purpose | Kaniv | 1972 | 49.7619°N 31.4654°E |
| | Cherkasy Dam | H16 / railroad Odesa Railways | Cherkasy | 1960 | 49.4791°N 32.0392°E |
| | Kremenchuk Hydroelectric Power Plant | T17-03 / railroad Southern Railways | Svitlovodsk | 1959 | 49.0732°N 33.2506°E |
| Крюківський міст | Kriukiv Bridge | M22 H08 / railroad Southern Railways | Kremenchuk | 21 December 1949 | 49.0526°N 33.4238°E |
| | New Kremenchuk Bridge | | | under construction | |
| | Middle Dnieper Hydroelectric Power Plant | T04-12 T04-14 / railroad Cisdnieper Railways | Kamianske | 1964 | 48.5466°N 34.5399°E |
| | Livoberezhnyi Bridge (Left-bank) | prospekt Anoshkina | Kamianske | 1996 | 48.534°N 34.5953°E |
| | Kaidatskyi Bridge | E50 M04 / city tram | Dnipro | 10 November 1982 | 48.4987°N 34.9659°E |
| | Staryi Bridge | vulytsia Karuny / city tram / railroad Cisdnieper Railways | Dnipro | 18 May 1884 | 48.4893°N 35.029°E |
| | Tsentralnyi Bridge (New) | Slobozhanskyi prospekt | Dnipro | 5 November 1966 | 48.4765°N 35.0562°E |
| | Merefa-Kherson Bridge | Railroad Cisdnieper Railways | Dnipro | 21 December 1932 | 48.4669°N 35.0823°E |
| | Monastyrskyi Island Bridge | pedestrian | Dnipro | | 48.4652°N 35.073°E |
| | Ust-Samarskyi Bridge | | Dnipro | | 48.4561°N 35.1156°E |
| Південний міст | Pivdennyi Bridge (Southern) | | Dnipro | 21 December 2000 | 48.4113°N 35.0995°E |
=== Lower stream (Zaporizhzhia and Kherson oblasts) ===
| Гребля Дніпровської ГЕС | Dnieper Hydroelectric Station | H08 | Zaporizhzhia | 1 May 1932 | 47.8636°N 35.089°E / 47.8626°N 35.0895°E |
| | Dniprohes Pedestrian Bridge | pedestrian | Zaporizhzhia | | 47.8646°N 35.0903°E / 47.8627°N 35.0897°E |
| Другий Преображенський міст | Zaporizhzhia Arch Bridge | Road | Zaporizhzhia | 1974 | 47.8619°N 35.0625°E |
| Новий міст через Дніпро та Старий Дніпро | Preobrazhensky Bridge | Railroad Cisdnieper Railways / T08-06 and Road | Zaporizhzhia | December 31, 1952 | 47.8204°N 35.0747°E |
| New Zaporizhzhia Dniper Bridge in 2021 | New Zaporizhzhia Dniper Bridge | Closed-Access Highway | Zaporizhzhia | Under Construction | 47.8426°N 35.0855°E |
| | Nikopol–Kamianka-Dniprovska Ferry | Nikopol – Kamianka-Dniprovska | Nikopol | | 47.8424°N 35.0853°E |
| Гребля Каховської ГЕС | Kakhovka Hydroelectric Power Plant | Railroad Odesa Railways / P47 | Nova Kakhovka | 1972, destroyed 2023-06-06 | 46.7741°N 33.3741°E |
| Антонівський залізничний міст | Antonivka Railway Bridge | Railroad Odesa Railways | Prydniprovske, Kherson Raion, Kherson Oblast | 31 December 1952 damaged during the Russian invasion of Ukraine | 46.6754°N 32.797°E |
| Антонівський міст | Antonivka Road Bridge | E97 M17 E58 M14 | Antonivka | 1985 damaged during the Russian invasion of Ukraine | 46.6697°N 32.7204°E |
