= Bridges in Dnipro =

The city of Dnipro is located at confluence of Dnieper and Samara rivers.

Name	Photo	Opened	Length (metres)	Width (metres)	Height	Type
Amur Bridge	Amur Bridge	18 May 1884	1,395	15.5		Double decker auto-rail bridge
Merefa-Kherson bridge	Merefa-Kherson bridge	21 December 1932	1,610			Railroad
Ingren (Samara) Bridge		1957				auto-rail bridge
Tsentralny Bridge	Central Bridge	5 November 1966	1,478	21		Auto bridge
Ust-Samara Bridge		1981				Auto bridge
Kaidatsky Bridge	Kaidaky Bridge	10 November 1982	1,732			Auto bridge with 3 lanes in both directions
Southern Bridge	Southern Bridge	21 December 2000	1,248	22		Auto bridge
Monastyrskyi Island bridge	Monastyrskyi island bridge					Pedestrian bridge
