= AZfront =

Social movement

AZfront is a social movement active in the South Caucasus, the Middle East, Central Asia, and Eastern Europe, as well as a media outlet of the same name, published on Telegram and YouTube.

As of the end of 2023, the channel boasts about 800,000 subscribers and operates in a closed format.

== History ==
The AZfront Telegram channel was launched on October 17, 2022. On September 21, 2023, amidst Azerbaijan's anti-terrorist operation in Karabakh, the first video was posted on the English-language YouTube channel AZfront. Within the first three months of its operation, the YouTube channel attracted 238,000 subscribers.

=== Activities in Israel ===
In January 2023, in response to external threats and sanctions against Azerbaijan from Western countries, primarily France, 30 ministers and members of the Israeli Knesset, representing both the coalition and the opposition, signed an open letter to the Milli Majlis of Azerbaijan. In this letter, Israeli parliamentarians expressed their gratitude for the decision to open the Azerbaijani embassy in Israel, hailed the Azerbaijan-Israel partnership as the cornerstone of the regional security system, and condemned the French parliament's calls for sanctions against Baku. AZfront was the first among media outlets to publish this letter on its Telegram channel.

=== Activities in Ukraine ===
AZfront provides informational support to Ukrainian intelligence services and the General Staff; notably, in October 2023, the news resource supplied compromising materials on Arayik Harutyunyan, the pro-Russian ex-president of the Armenian separatists in Karabakh. He was among the first in February 2022 to applaud Putin's decision to recognize the independence of the "DPR" and "LPR."

Furthermore, in October 2023, deputies of the Verkhovna Rada of Ukraine expressed their support for Azerbaijan and its people concerning the complete restoration of Azerbaijani sovereignty over Karabakh. Twenty deputies from the dominant party, including Olexander Yurchenko, Volodymyr Vatras, and Ihor Kryvosheev, signed a joint letter stating that “a media campaign was launched against Azerbaijan to discredit it” and that “all of Ukraine supports Azerbaijan in its fight against separatism.” The primary source of this news was the AZfront Telegram channel, as mentioned in the deputies’ statement.

Ukrainian celebrities, such as Andriy Yatsenko from the Green Gray group and Iryna Bilyk, also expressed their support for Azerbaijan, mentioning the AZfront movement in their statements.

=== Activities Worldwide ===
In May 2023, AZfront's reports on the intensification of military cooperation between France and Armenia and the provision of 50 French armored personnel carriers to Yerevan became a primary source in the public domain. These reports were quoted by media in Ukraine, Azerbaijan, Israel, Macedonia, Bulgaria, Romania, Moldova, Lithuania, Montenegro, Croatia, and Latvia.

Additionally, Serbian and Russian opposition media cited exclusive news from AZfront confirming Sierra Nevada's subversive activities against Turkey. The company, directly associated with the CIA and US military for critical intelligence collection, has been implicated in operations against Turkey, particularly in Libya.

In August–September 2023, 155 rabbis from Israel, Europe, the USA, Canada, Latin America, and the UK, along with about a hundred Jewish religious media and European publications, condemned the exploitation of the Holocaust theme by Armenian figures, including Prime Minister Pashinyan, in a campaign to demonize Azerbaijan. Azfront was the first to publish scans of a collective appeal from over a hundred European rabbis to the leadership of Armenia, including President Khachaturian and Prime Minister Pashinyan, as well as Israeli President Herzog. Jewish media worldwide cited the appeal, referencing AZfront as the primary source.

== Social Movement Activities ==
The AZfront social movement organizes actions in France, Luxembourg, Iran, Armenia, Austria, Georgia, Kazakhstan, Turkey, Ukraine, and Germany.

=== European Actions ===
On September 24, 2023, the movement staged a rally of AZfront activists in front of the Secretariat of the European Parliament in Luxembourg. The rally supported the full restoration of Azerbaijani sovereignty over Karabakh and was a response to the increasing campaign in Europe led by representatives of the Armenian diaspora to demonize Azerbaijan.

== Ownership ==
There were numerous speculations from various media outlets, including those in the US, Romania, Ukraine, Russia and Armenia, on the issue. The project and its news were mentioned or discussed in publications of reputable media from the USA (such as Newsweek and National Interest), Great Britain, Germany, Romania, Bulgaria, Lithuania, Moldova, Greece and Ukraine. According to AZfront itself, the project is self-financed by the idea-driven part of the team and Azerbaijani businessmen.

== Charity in Ukraine ==
Since December 2022, AZfront has begun providing humanitarian aid to the civilian population of Ukraine. At the initiative of AZfront, 15 generators, purchased with funds collected by 170 subscribers of AZfront from Baku, Sumgait, and Ganja, were delivered to the residents of Kharkiv, Kherson, and Donetsk regions.

In February 2023, vehicles for volunteers in the Kharkiv region were purchased in the same way with the collected money. These vehicles are used for evacuating civilians from front-line settlements and delivering humanitarian cargoes.

In March, AZfront, together with the "I Am Saved" Charity Foundation, delivered 175 food packages as humanitarian aid to the residents of the Prudyansky starostate.

In May, the AZfront team in Ukraine founded the UkrAzFront charity fund, led by Kharkiv volunteer Iрor Shytikov. At the same time, the fund delivered about 100 food packages to pensioners, low-income citizens, and children of the liberated Ukrainian city of Izium. In June 2023, the foundation provided more than 24 tons of humanitarian aid to the residents of eastern Ukraine, including 21 tons distributed among the residents of the villages of Komyshany, Pryozerne, Semenivka in the Kherson region. The foundation delivered more than 1 ton of baby food, diapers, and other items to the regional children's hospital and the hospital in the Korabelnyi district of Kherson. In July, UkrAZfront delivered 2 tons of food products to the Ministry of Internal Affairs hospital in the Kharkiv region; another 100 food packages were received by the residents of Korobochkyne village in the Chuhuiv district, and separate assistance was provided to the nursing home in Izyum. In September of the same year, 2 tons of humanitarian aid were delivered to Izyum, and another 1.4 tons of food and medicines were distributed among the residents of the city of Volchansk, which was liberated from Russian occupation in September 2022. Since September 2023, the AZfront foundation has taken under its care children from the Kharkiv region suffering from cerebral palsy and epilepsy, with over 200 kg of food packages and medicines already delivered by the foundation. To the Kherson region, which suffered in June due to the destruction of the Kakhovka Reservoir dam, 20 tons of humanitarian aid were delivered. UkrAZfront also evacuated dozens of animals from the flood zones in Kherson. They were placed in shelters in Kharkiv.

In total, in 2023, on the initiative of AZfront, 65 tons of humanitarian aid were delivered to Ukraine, including food packages, baby food, diapers, and medicines.
