= Antonivka Railway Bridge =

Antonivka Rail Bridge
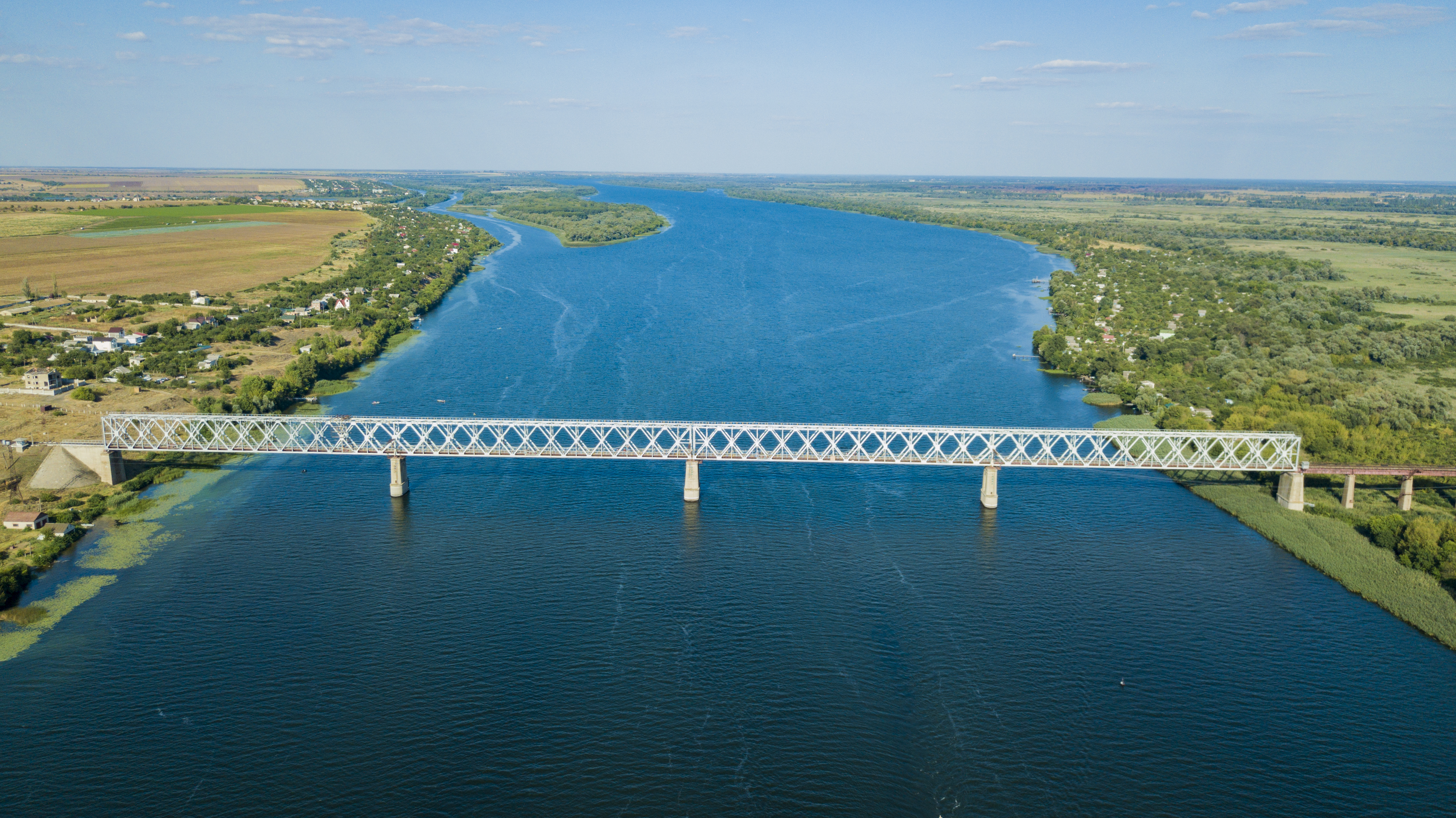
- Antonivka Railway Bridge
- Coordinates: 46.6754°N 32.797°E
- Carried: Kherson–Kerch railway line
- Crossed: Dnieper
- Locale: Kherson, Kherson Oblast, Ukraine

Rail characteristics
- No. of tracks: 1

History
- Opened: 12 December 1954; 71 years ago
- Destroyed: November 2022; 3 years ago

Location
- Interactive map of Antonivka Rail Bridge

The Antonivka Railway Bridge (Ukrainian: Антонівський залізничний міст, romanized: Antonivskyi zaliznychnyi mist) was a single-track railway bridge over the Dnieper, in the Kherson Oblast in southern Ukraine. It connected rail networks in Ukraine on either side of Dnieper. The Kherson–Kerch Railway line ran over the bridge. The bridge was destroyed after the retreat of Russian troops in November 2022.

== Geographical location ==
The bridge is located at kilometre 43.5 of the river near the confluence of the Inhulets and the Dnieper and six kilometres east of the urban settlement of Antonivka, in Kherson, after which it was named.

== History ==
The construction of the bridge began in 1939, but with the beginning of the German-Soviet war it was interrupted after the first pillars had been installed. The Germans built a railway bridge some distance downstream, which was destroyed during the war.

A railway engineering regiment familiar with overcoming water barriers was commissioned in 1949 to build the nearly one kilometre-long strategic bridge. The railway bridge was put into operation on 12 December 1954.

In the course of the Russian attack on Ukraine beginning in 2022, the bridge became strategically important as a route for Russian troops heading west. After the bridge had fallen into Russian hands during the first days of the war, it was made impassable by Ukrainian air raids during the summer of 2022. The bridge was completely destroyed in November 2022 during the withdrawal of Russian troops from the right bank of the Dnieper, as was the nearby Antonivka Road Bridge.

== See also ==
- Antonivka Road Bridge
- List of crossings of the Dnieper
