= Shevchenko Park =

Shevchenko Park (Ukrainian: Парк імені Тараса Шевченка) may refer to several parks mostly in Ukraine, named after Taras Shevchenko:

- Taras Shevchenko Park, in Dnipro; see FC Dynamo Dnipropetrovsk
- Shevchenko Park, in Ivano-Frankivsk
- Shevchenko Park, in Kharkiv
- Taras Shevchenko Park, on Volodymyrska Street in Kyiv
- Shevchenko Park in Nizhyn, Chernihiv Oblast
- Shevchenko Park, in Odesa
- Shevchenko Park, in Pereshchepyne, Dnipropetrovsk Oblast
- Shevchenko Park, in Rivne
- Shevchenko Park, in Ternopil
- Taras G. Shevchenko Park in Winnipeg, Manitoba, Canada

== See also ==
- Taras Shevchenko Garden, in Kharkiv
