= Kherson urban hromada =

Urban hromada of Kherson Oblast, Ukraine

Kherson urban hromada Херсоньска міська громада
- Hromada
- Interactive map of Kherson urban hromada
- Country: Ukraine
- Oblast: Kherson
- Raion: Kherson

Area
  - Total: 452.6 km^{2} (174.7 sq mi)

Population (2023)
  - Total: 367,873
  - Density: 812.8/km^{2} (2,105/sq mi)
- Settlements: 16
- Cities: 1
- Villages: 11
- Towns: 4
- Website: www.city.kherson.ua

Kherson urban territorial hromada (Ukrainian: Херсонська міська територіальна громада, romanized: Khersonska miska terytorialna hromada) is one of the hromadas of Ukraine, located in Kherson Raion in Kherson Oblast. Its administrative centre is the city of Kherson.

Kherson urban hromada has an area of 452.6 km^{2} (174.7 mi^{2}), as well as a population of 367,873 (as of 2023).

== Composition ==
In addition to one city (Kherson), the hromada contains four urban-type settlements:

- Antonivka
- Komyshany
- Naddniprianske
- Zelenivka

Furthermore, there are 11 villages in the hromada:

- Blahovishchenske
- Bohdanivka
- Inzhenerne
- Molodizhne
- Petrivka
- Prydniprovske
- Pryozerne
- Sadove
- Soniachne
- Stepanivka
- Zymivnyk

The unincorporated settlement Dachi is also located within the territory of the hromada, but it holds no legal status.
