= Antonivka Road Bridge =

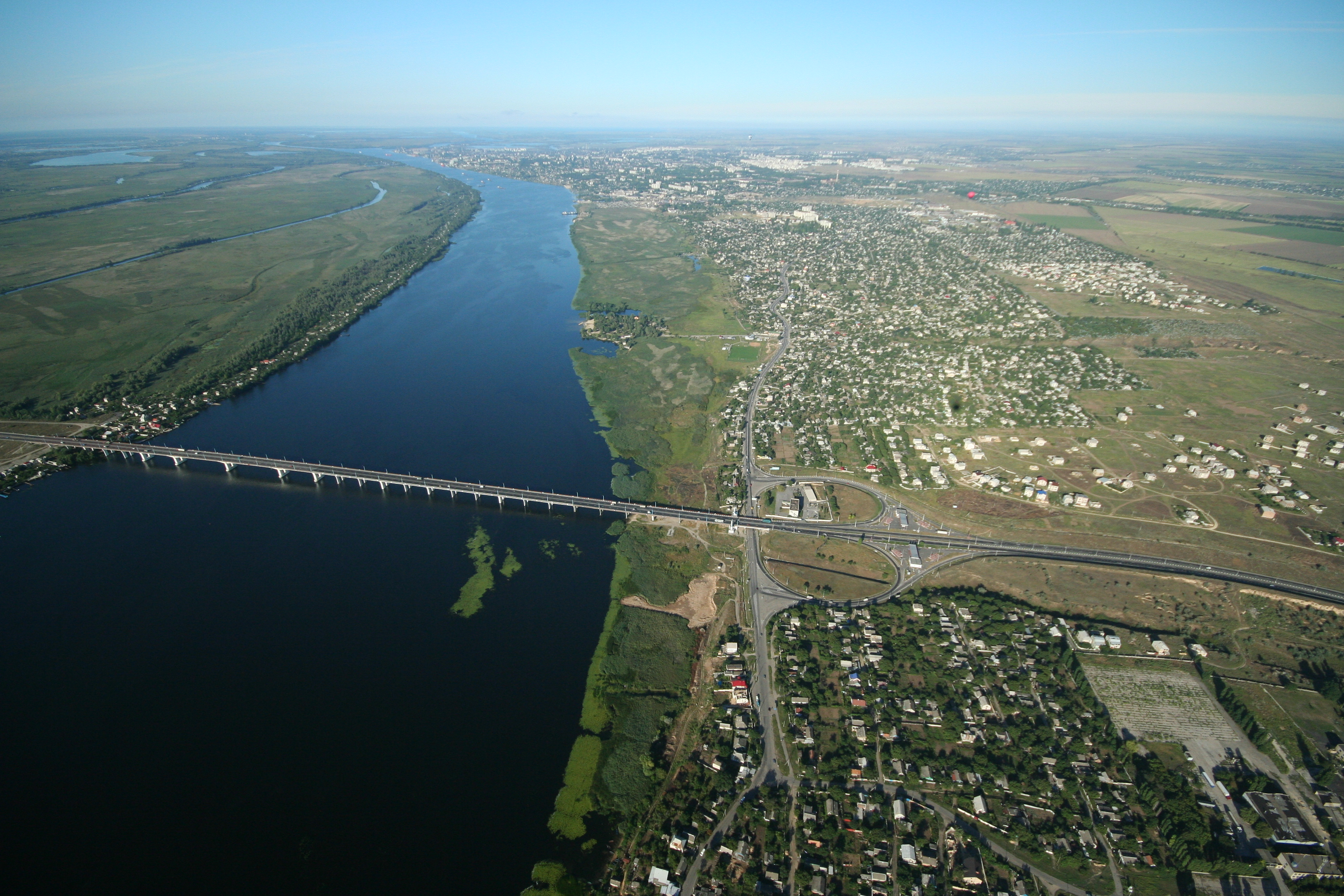
- The Bridge in 2006. Antonivka on the right, Dachi on the left.
- Coordinates: 46°40′12″N 32°43′13″E
- Carried: Highway M14
- Crossed: Dnieper
- Locale: Kherson, Kherson Oblast, Ukraine

Characteristics
- Design: Box girder bridge
- Total length: 1,366 m (4,482 ft)

History
- Opened: 24 December 1985; 40 years ago
- Destroyed: 11 November 2022; 4 years ago

Statistics
- Daily traffic: 0

Location
- Interactive map of Antonivka Road Bridge

The Antonivka Road Bridge (Ukrainian: Антонівський автомобільний міст, romanized: Antonivskyi avtomobilnyi mist), also referred to as the Antonivskyi Bridge (Антонівський міст [ɐnˈtɔn⁽ʲ⁾iu̯sʲkɪj ˈmist]), is a ruined box girder bridge on the Dnieper river in Kherson, Kherson Oblast, southern Ukraine. It became a flashpoint during the Russian invasion of Ukraine, and was largely destroyed in November 2022.

== Design and construction ==
The bridge had been planned since 1977. It opened on 24 December 1985. It was located in the town of Antonivka, Kherson Raion, Kherson Oblast and connected the town to the unincorporated settlement Dachi on Antonivskiy Island which is connected to Oleshky via route E97 and another bridge over the Konka river. The Antonivka bridge was 1,366 m (4,482 ft) long and rested on 31 pillars.

== Russian invasion of Ukraine ==
=== Russian capture ===
The bridge changed hands several times in February 2022 as Russian forces attempted to establish a path from Russian-held Crimea into central Ukraine. Ukrainian forces eventually lost control over the area on 26 February 2022 after fierce fighting, leaving several dead soldiers and destroyed military vehicles lying on the bridge.

In a daily intelligence report by the British Ministry of Defence from mid-July 2022, the bridge was described as a "key vulnerability for Russian forces". Observers considered it to be the most important road crossing to the Russian-controlled areas west of the Dnieper river, the only other one being at the Kakhovka Hydroelectric Power Plant.

=== Ukrainian bridge attacks ===
On 19 July, the bridge was damaged by Ukrainian rocket fire, allegedly using HIMARS rockets supplied by the United States. Ukrainian forces struck the bridge again the next day. Russian forces struggled to repair the bridge and temporarily closed it to cargo traffic. The two strikes on the bridge, as well as remarks by Russian Foreign Minister Sergey Lavrov to the effect that the territorial gains in the Kherson region would be consolidated as the result of the use of wider-range weapons – to which class HIMARS belongs – by Ukraine, were seen by observers as indicating that the region could become one of the focal points of fighting.

At approximately 22:55 on 26 July 2022, the bridge sustained heavy damage following Ukrainian rocket fire using HIMARS, leading to the bridge being closed to passenger traffic. Some observers considered this third attack to be part of the counteroffensive announced earlier by Ukraine, which aimed to recapture the Kherson region. TASS reported that the Russian air defence systems had intercepted the projectiles, but this was disputed by the Ukrainian forces and did not match visual evidence. Later reports and video footage from 27 July showed that the roadway surface on the bridge had been damaged; the surface was unusable for transit of heavy machinery.

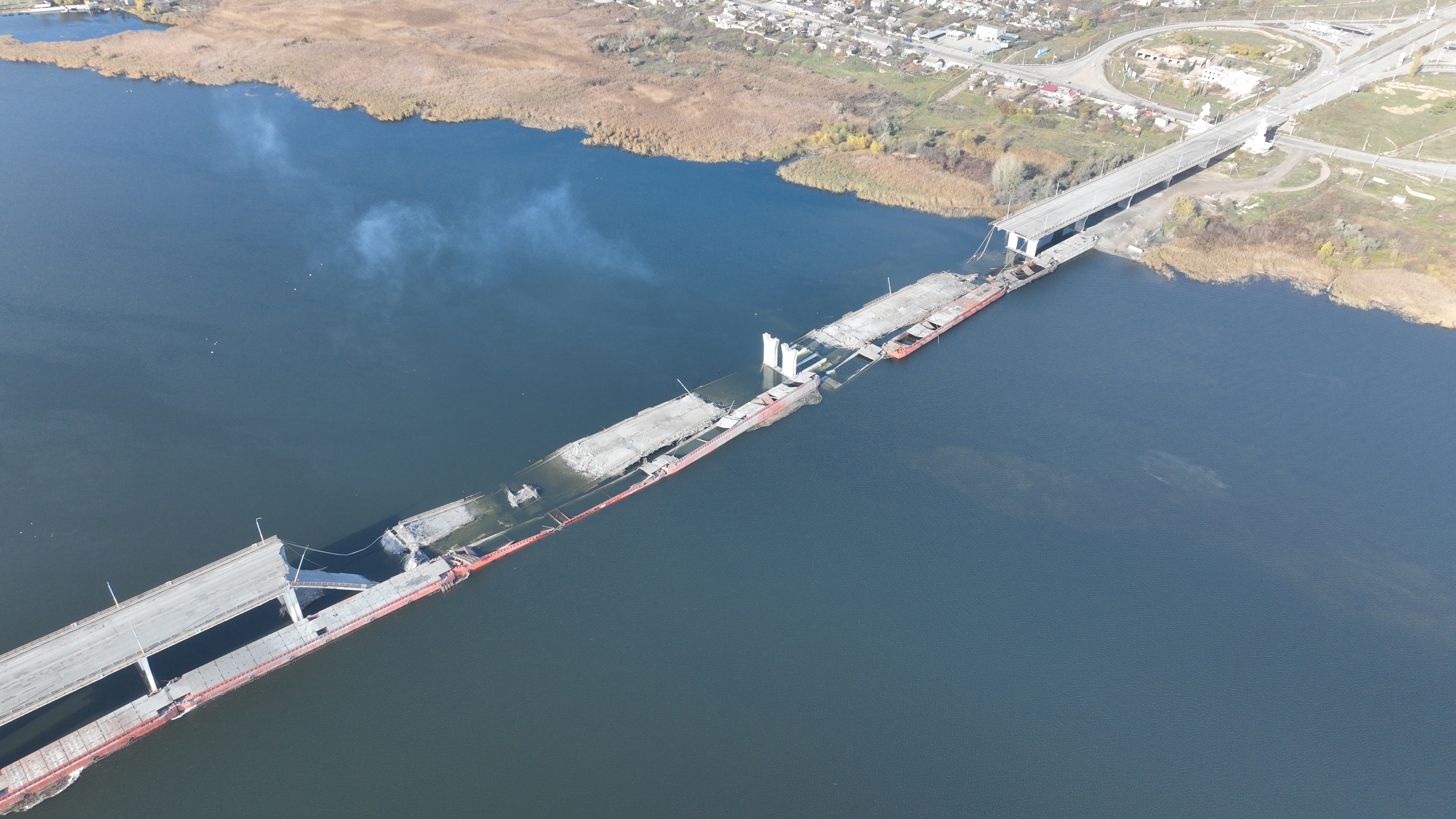
The bridge in November 2022, after the Battle of Kherson

By 23 August, repairs to the bridge had been completed and it was again in use by Russian forces. On 25 August, satellite images showed no fewer than 16 damage holes on the southern end of the bridge, with vehicle traffic queuing on both sides as a temporary ferry services provided a crossing route across the Dnieper. A pontoon bridge was constructed by Russian forces on the eastern side of the bridge and was 60% completed as of 25 August.

The crossing was struck again on 29 August amid reports of a Ukrainian counteroffensive, and strikes continued on the bridge and crossing throughout the closing days of August. By early September, Russian authorities said the bridge would be impassable for cars for weeks.

=== Russian retreat ===
By 11 November, with Ukrainian forces entering Kherson and Russian forces leaving it, part of the bridge collapsed; according to the prominent Russian military blogger Rybar, the Russians destroyed it. An adjacent pontoon bridge was used by Russian forces during their withdrawal from Kherson.

=== After the Retreat ===
Combat around the bridge continued after the Russian retreat. During the 2023 Ukrainian counteroffensive, Ukraine established a bridgehead around the bridge.

In 2025, Russian troops launched an offensive to remove the Ukrainian presence around the bridge. In 2026, the 34th Marine Brigade (Ukraine) captured footage of elements of Russian 98th Guards Airborne Division surrendering to Ukrainian troops on the Russian side of the river.

== See also ==
- Antonivka Railway Bridge
- List of crossings of the Dnieper
