= Kaidatsky Bridge =

Kaidatsky Bridge Кайдацький міст
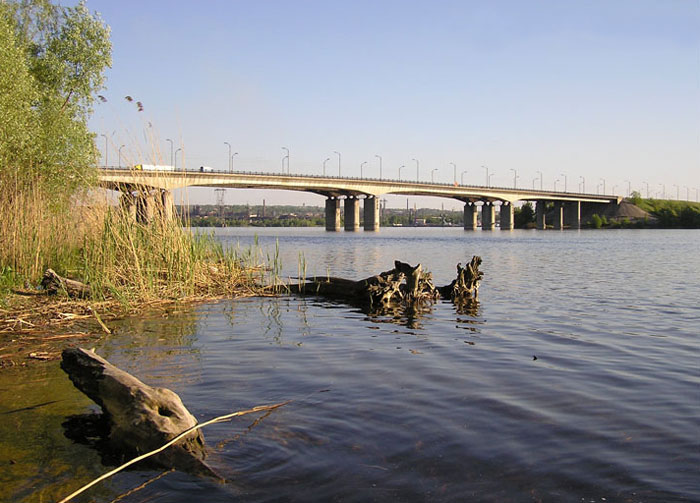
- Coordinates: 48.4987°N 34.9659°E
- Carries: Automobiles
- Crosses: Dnieper
- Locale: Dnipro, Ukraine

Characteristics
- Total length: 1,732 m (5,682 ft)
- Width: 26 m (85 ft)

History
- Constructed by: "Mostostroi" (Ministry of Transport Construction of the USSR)
- Construction start: 1975
- Opened: 1982

Statistics
- Daily traffic: 2 way (3 lanes each way)

Location
- Interactive map of Kaidatsky Bridge

Kaidatsky Bridge (Ukrainian: Кайдацький міст) or Kaidaky Bridge is a bridge over Dnieper in the city of Dnipro, Ukraine. The bridge connects right (Novokodatskyi District) and left (Amur-Nyzhnodniprovskyi District) banks of Dnipro and is part of the European route E50.

The bridge is named after an old Zaporizhian Cossack settlement, Novi Kodaky (Kaidaky). The crossing across Dnieper existed since at least the 17th century.

The bridge stretches over an island Namystanka. The island is part of Sukhachivka arboretum (also known as Diyivka Park) and administered by the Dnipro State Forestry.

== See also ==
- Bridges in Dnipro
