= Zelenivka, Kherson Oblast =

Rural locality in Kherson Oblast, Ukraine

Zelenivka Зеленівка
- Rural settlement
- Location in Kherson Oblast Location in Ukraine
- Country: Ukraine
- Oblast: Kherson Oblast
- Raion: Kherson Raion
- Hromada: Kherson urban hromada

Area
  - Total: 6.44 km^{2} (2.49 sq mi)

Population (2022)
  - Total: 5,713
  - Density: 887/km^{2} (2,300/sq mi)
- Time zone: UTC+2 (EET)
  - Summer (DST): UTC+3 (EEST)

Zelenivka (Ukrainian: Зеленівка; Russian: Зеленовка) is a rural settlement in Kherson Raion, Kherson Oblast, southern Ukraine. It is located in the steppe some 5 kilometres (3.1 mi) northeast of the city of Kherson. Zelenivka belongs to Kherson urban hromada, one of the hromadas of Ukraine. It has a population of 5,713 (2022 estimate).

== History ==
Until 18 July 2020, Zelenivka belonged to Kherson Municipality. The municipality as an administrative unit was abolished in July 2020 as part of the administrative reform of Ukraine, which reduced the number of raions of Kherson Oblast to five. The area of Kherson Municipality was merged into Kherson Raion.

Until 26 January 2024, Zelenivka was designated urban-type settlement. On this day, a new law entered into force which abolished this status, and Zelenivka became a rural settlement.

== Economy ==
=== Transportation ===
The closest railway station, about 2 kilometres (1.2 mi) south of the settlement, is Kherson-Skhidnyi, on the railway connecting Kherson and Snihurivka. There is infrequent passenger traffic.

The settlement has road access to Kherson, as well as to Highway M14, which connects Kherson with Mykolaiv and Melitopol.

== See also ==
- Russian occupation of Kherson Oblast
