= Taras Shevchenko Park =

Park in Dnipro, Ukraine

Taras Shevchenko Park of Culture and Recreation
- Центральний парк культури та відпочинку ім. Т. Г. Шевченка
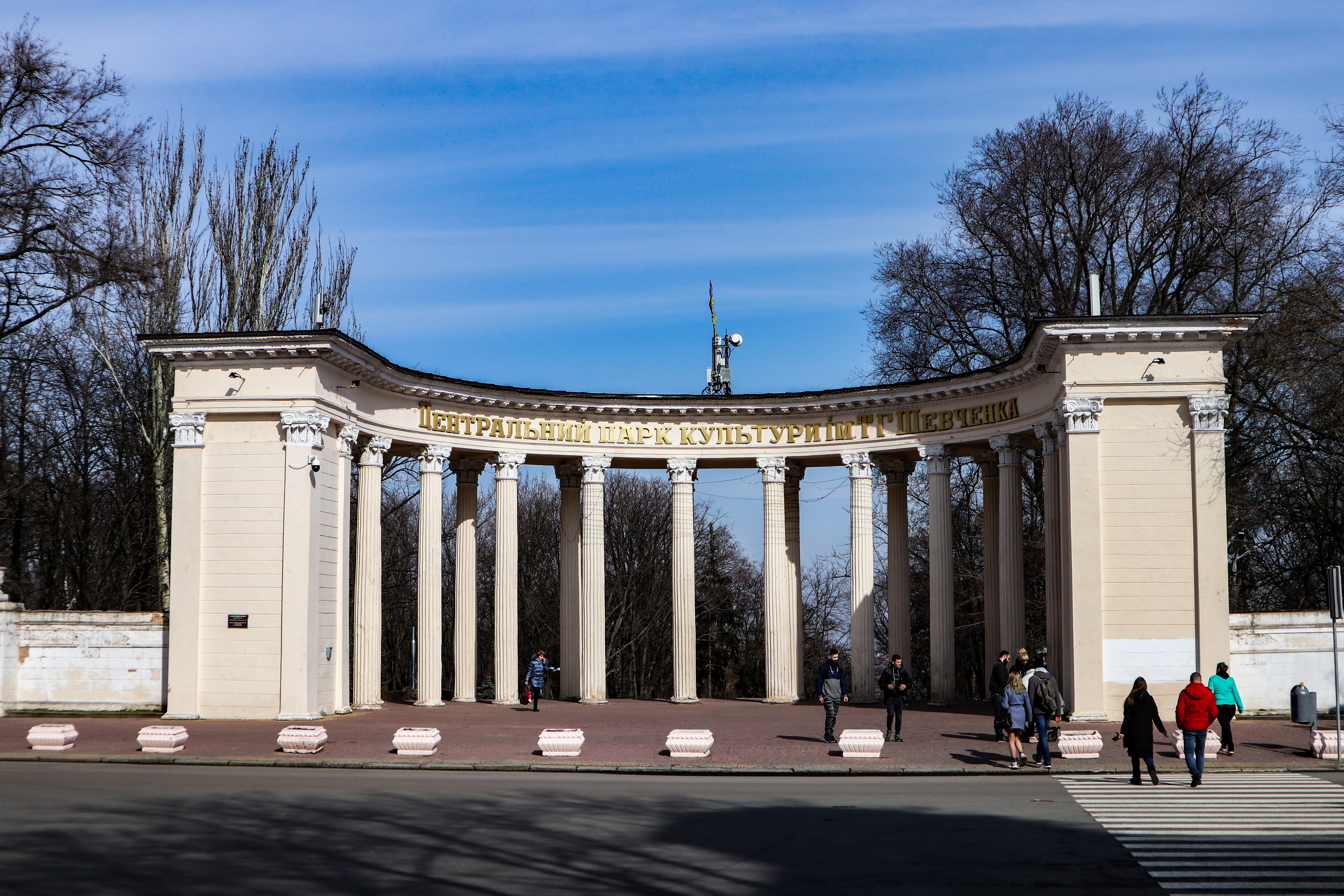
- Propylaeum in Shevchenko Park
- Interactive map of Taras Shevchenko Park of Culture and Recreation
- Type: Urban park
- Location: Dnipro Raion
- Nearest city: Dnipro
- Coordinates: 48°27′46″N 35°04′20″E
- Area: 36 hectares (89 acres)
- Created: 1790s
- Founder: Lazar Hloba
- Etymology: Taras Shevchenko
- Operator: Dnipro City Council
- Status: monument of landscape art

The Taras Shevchenko Park (Ukrainian: Парк імені Тараса Шевченка, romanized: Park imeni Tarasa Shevchenka) or the Taras Shevchenko Park of Culture and Recreation, is Dnipro's central and oldest park. The mainland and a portion of Monastyrskyi Island make up the park. Known as the Potemkin Garden, it stood from the 1790s to 1925.

== History ==
In the far-off 1790s, the park was established. Initially, a fruit garden was created on this area by Cossack Lazar Hloba, a former army officer from Zaporizhzhia, together with his companions Ignat Kaplun and Nikita Korzh. He was involved in gardening and owned a watermill and a wool goods factory. Empress Catherine II made the decision to relocate Katerynoslav (Note: Dnipro has been renamed multiple time; it has its current name since 2016 when it was renamed (from Dnipropetrovsk) to comply with decommunization laws. It was named Dnipropetrovsk from 1926. The city was originally known as Katerynoslav.) -Kilchensky to the Dnieper's right bank at the beginning of 1780. Beside the garden, the Potemkin Palace was constructed for Grigory Potemkin. The palace became Potemkin's primary home, served as the inspiration for the construction of the palace and park complex in Katerynoslav.

When Catherine II came to visit the city, the park was regarded as her formal residence as well. Potemkin had intended for his home to be modeled after the vogue English landscape garden. He invited the Englishman William Gould in 1789 to create a landscape close to the palace. Two expansive greenhouses were established in an English landscape park under his direction. However, the garden and park ideal was never realized due to the untimely death of Yekaterinoslav Governor General, and for many years, despite Emperor Alexander I's 1805 directives to the Ministry of Internal Affairs, which is under Potemkin Park's control, desolation prevails.

The property was purportedly purchased for 3,000 rubles to create the English park, but it appears that he never got payment. At least, Lazar Hloba's descendants sued the state for this for ten years, from 1795 to 1805, requesting 3,825 rubles in damages. The construction of Potemkin's mansion with garden had to be abandoned following his untimely demise, and the park's whole area was given to the treasury. Emperor Paul I ordered the greenhouse to be auctioned in May 1798 for 1039 rubles.

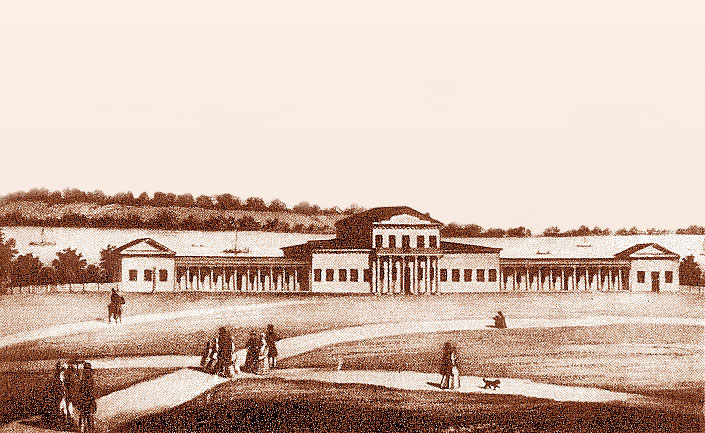
Potemkin Palace in the mid-19th century

While some plants perished, others moved inside the homes of the aristocracy. The palace lay unoccupied and the garden languished for a long while. The old palace and garden were given to Catherine II's nobles in the 1830s. The process of gradually returning the residence's territory has started since then. On the park's grounds, folk festivals, balls, and other celebrations were held in the middle of the 19th century.

Subsequently, the palace became the home of the Katerinoslav Public Museum of Antiquities (1849). Potemkin Garden served as the city's hub for social and cultural activities during the close of the 19th and the beginning of the 20th centuries. Only until the Merefa-Kherson bridge work started in 1914–1915 did the Monastyrskyi Island re-join the park. Many trees felled after the Russian Revolution, and the mansion was moved to the newly established Katerynoslav University in 1918. In 1925, Taras Shevchenko was honored by the park's name. The park was renovated in 1927.

In 1935, an outdoor theater made its debut in the park's eastern section. It was made out of a playground with a musical "sink" behind a stage. The amphitheater could accommodate 500 standing and 2,500 seating guests. The theater was destroyed by fire during World War II and was never rebuilt. Following the war, the park had its next significant redevelopment, which lasted from 1945 to 1952. A colonnade in the classicist style was created at the park's entrance during the late 1940s, and the palace had another reconstruction in 1952. The island was once again incorporated to the park in 1958, when it was known as Komsomolsky Island. The park's admission charge was eliminated in 1963, and in 1968 a cable car was installed to the island.

The park had a major makeover from 1971 to 1974. After that, the park was embellished with sculptures from the gardens and park, there were less alleyways, and in 1977 a 1,500-seat municipal lecture hall was constructed there. A prominent feature of the park was a sizable freshwater aquarium that doubled as a leisure area and a research lab when it first opened on the island in 1984. Potemkin's garden and park complex now consists of just 8,000 trees and over 2,000 plants representing 68 different species. One of the few urban landscape parks in Ukraine and the globe with its historical limits still intact is the Taras Shevchenko Park.

December 2023 saw the start of the installation of a New Year tree in the middle of Shevchenko Park. In two days, the 10 metres (33 ft) tree would be able to entertain both locals and visitors to Dnipro. Presently, it is acknowledged as a landscape architectural landmark and is a popular spot for strolling and relaxation for residents and visitors.

== Landmarks and structures ==
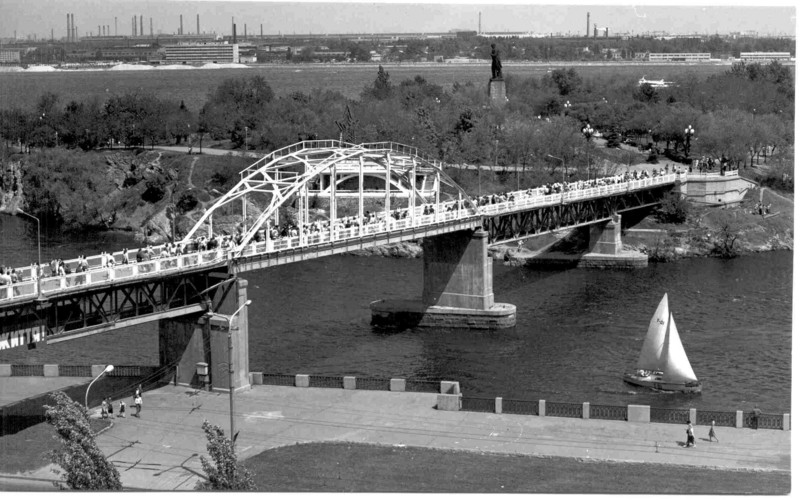
The pedestrian bridge in 1980

After World War II, a new large-scale reconstruction of the park begins. Its territory is increased due to part of Shevchenko Square, the palace is being rebuilt (renamed to Palace of Student Culture since 1952), new alleys are being laid, a cast-iron fence in the Empire style is installed. A monument to Joseph Stalin (dismantled in 1961) is erected on the central alley of the park.

As Shevchenko Park is elevated, the observation platform provides a view of the embankment and the Dnieper. Numerous eateries and a flowing fountain are also present. Accessing the Sicheslav Embankment or walking across the pedestrian bridge to Monastyrsky Island is a straightforward process. There's a waterfall and a memorial to Taras Shevchenko. Other landmarks and facilities are as follows:

- Potemkin Palace – built by Grigory Potemkin and completed in 1791.
- Pedestrian bridge – built in 1957 to connect the island to the mainland.
- Monument of Taras Shevchenko – the memorial to Shevchenko was erected in 1959 on the island's central route. It replaced the previous monument, which was constructed in 1949 on the mainland and whose pedestal still stands today.
- Monastyrskyi Island – the Church of St. Nicholas, erected on Monastyry Island in 1999. In 2006, the park's observation deck underwent reconstruction, complemented by the installation of a fountain. Subsequently, in 2013, the monument to Taras Shevchenko underwent an overhaul, coinciding with the unveiling of the fountain-waterfall, "Threshold of the Roar." Among the historical features is an observation tower dating back to the 1950s. Presently, the site also boasts a Ferris wheel.

== Gallery ==
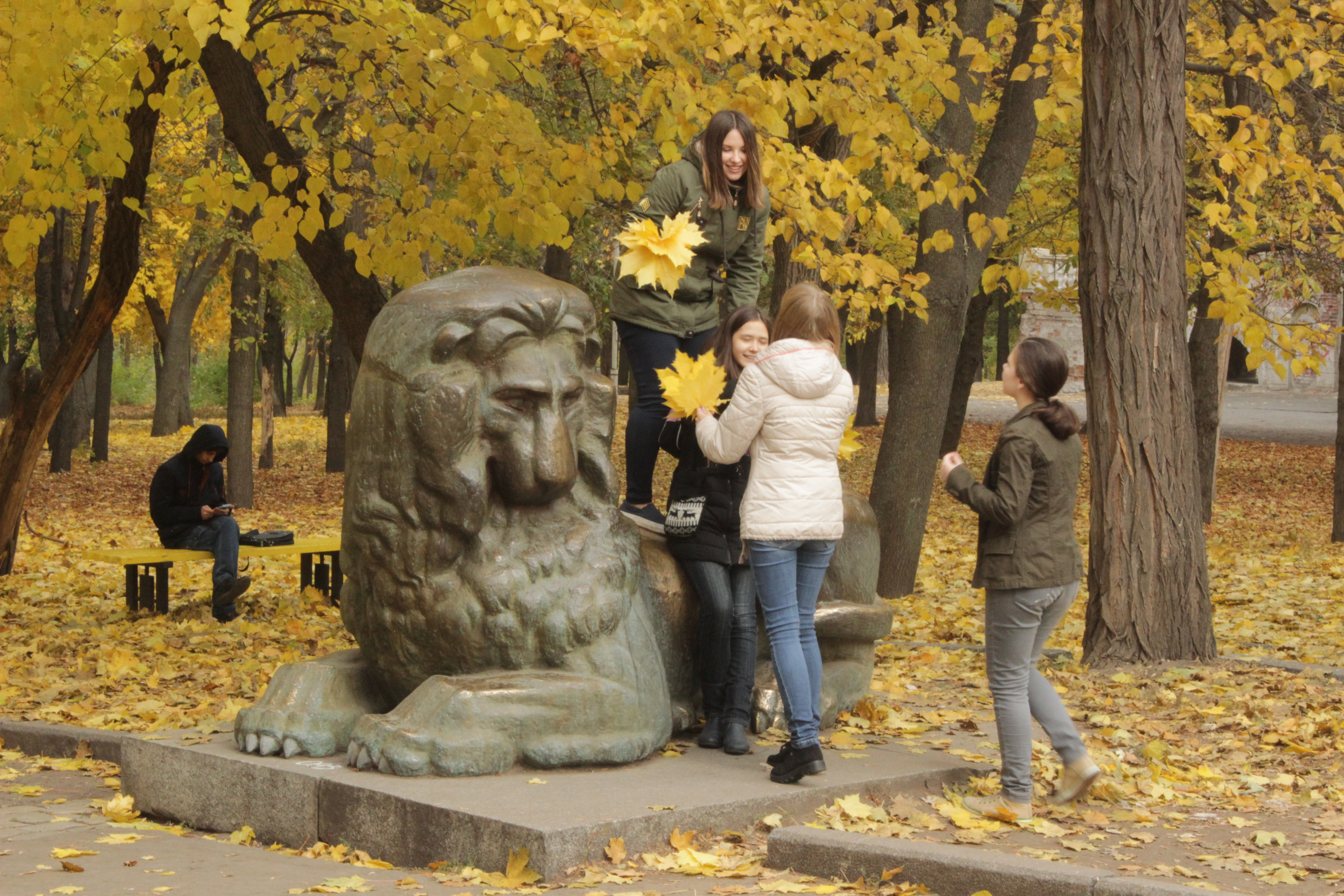
The Bronze Lion statue in 2015

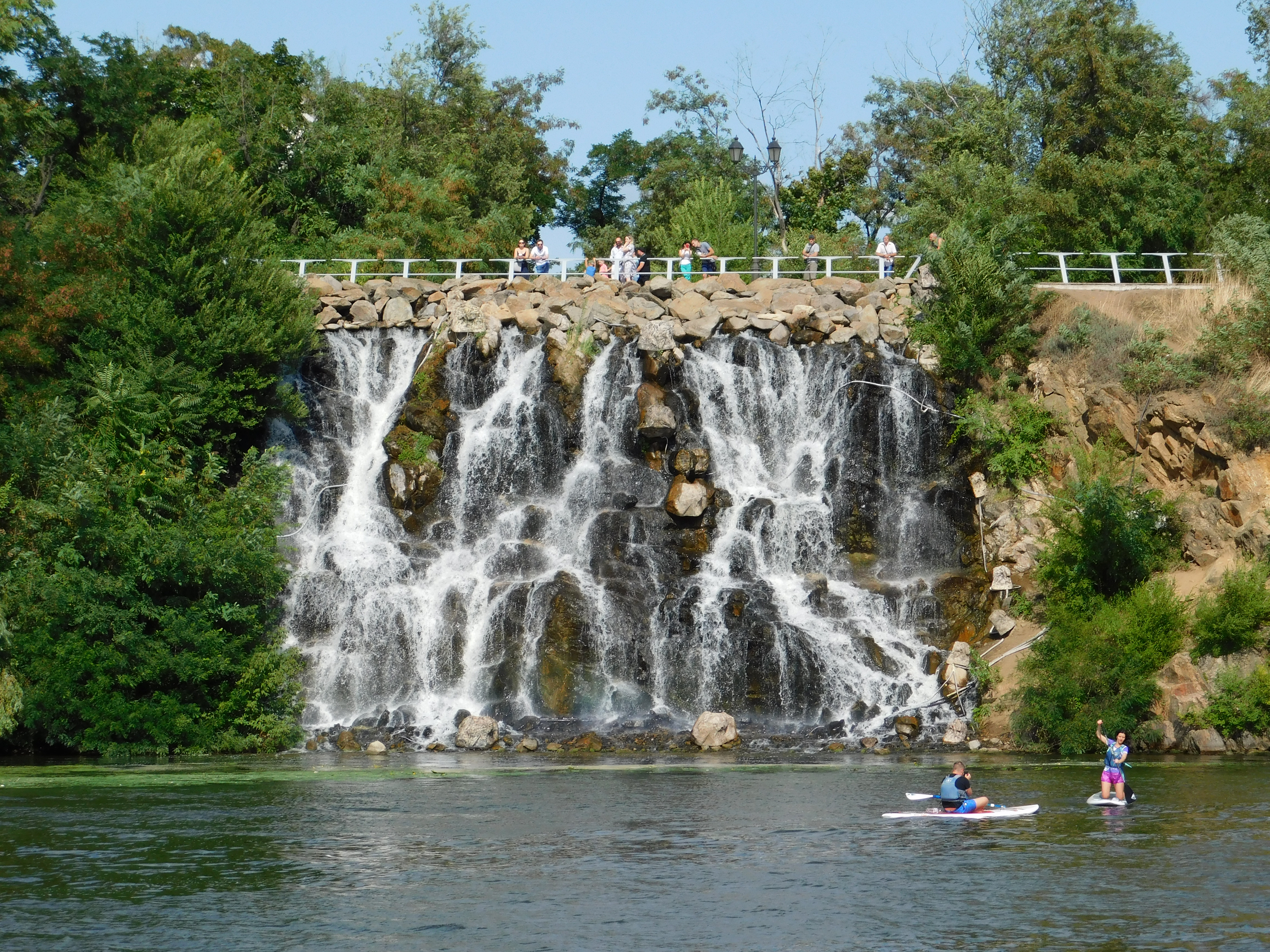
Monastyrskyi Island's waterfall in 2019

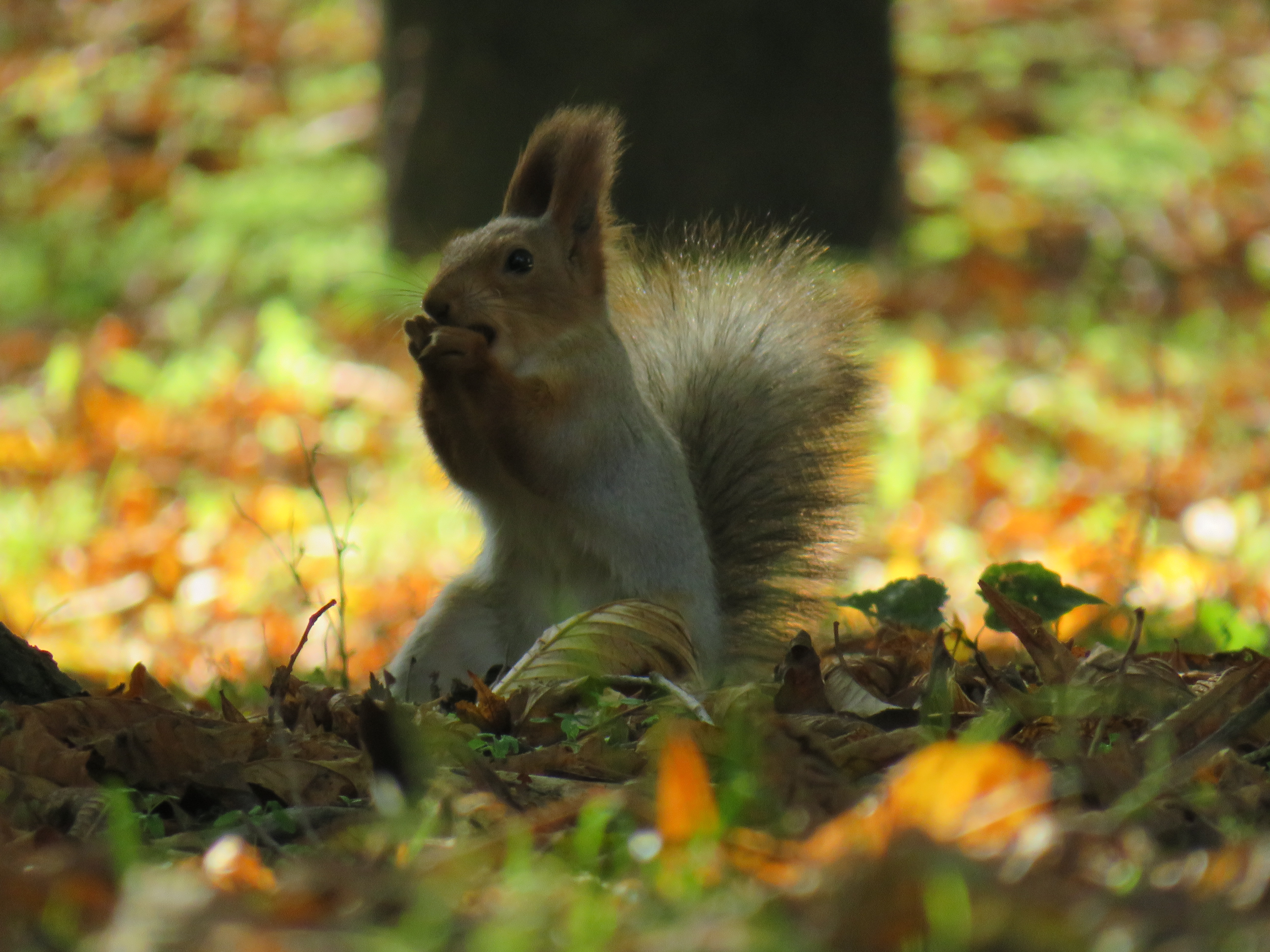
A red squirrel at the park in 2020

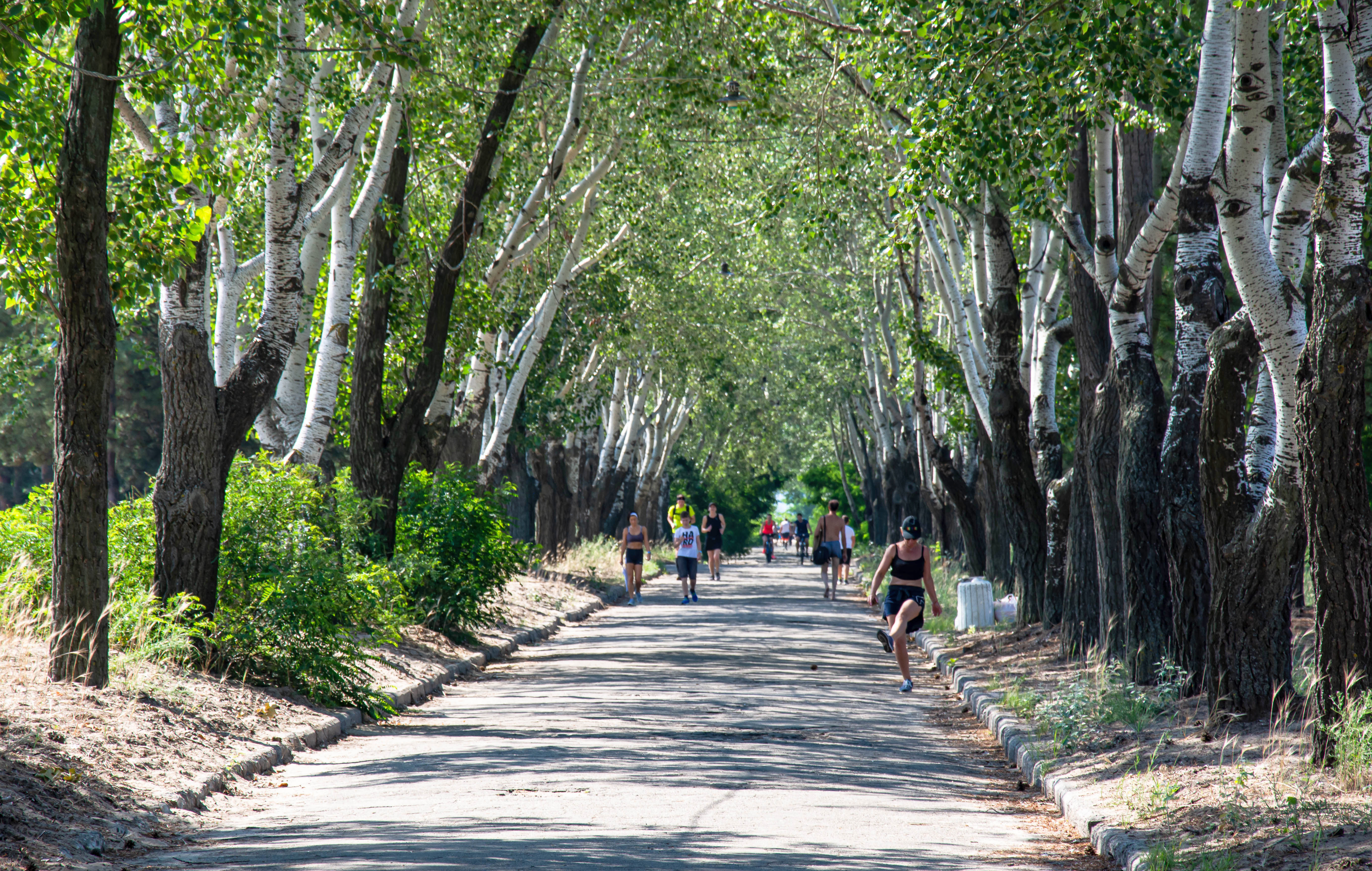
A pathway at the park in 2020

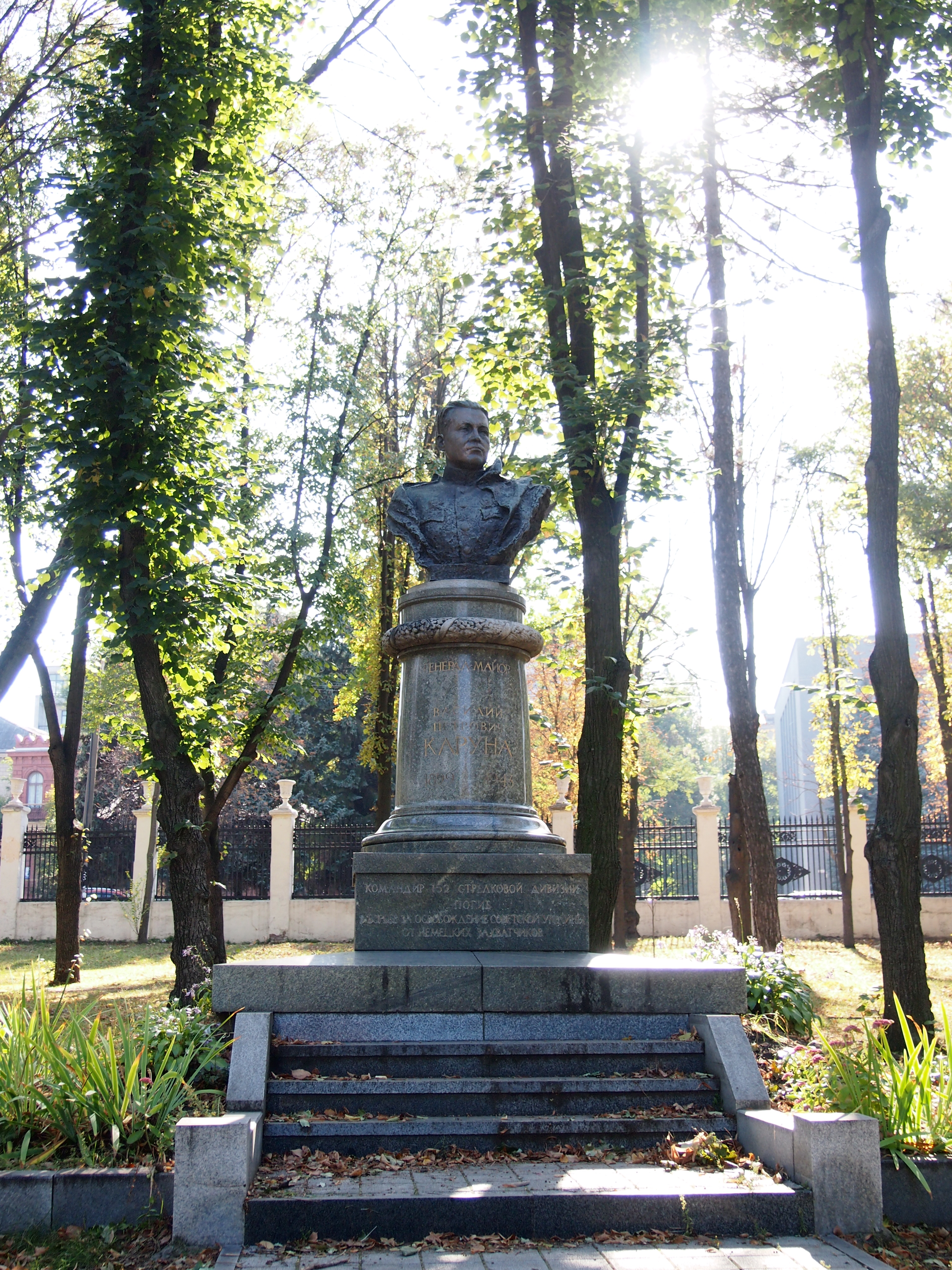
A statue of Vasily Karuna in 2014
