= Prydniprovske, Kherson Oblast =

Prydniprovske Придніпровське
- Rural settlement
- Location within Kherson Oblast Location within Ukraine
- Coordinates: 46°40′48″N 32°47′31″E
- Country: Ukraine
- Oblast: Kherson Oblast
- Raion: Kherson Raion
- Hromada: Kherson urban hromada

Area
  - Total: 0.086 km^{2} (0.033 sq mi)
- Elevation: 25 m (82 ft)
- Postal code: 75035

Prydniprovske (Ukrainian: Придніпровське) is a rural settlement in southern Ukraine, located on the Dnipro right bank in Kherson urban hromada, Kherson Raion, Kherson Oblast.

== History ==
On 12 June 2020, in accordance with a decree by the Ukrainian parliament determining the extents and administrative centers of hromadas in Kherson Oblast, Prydniprovske became part of Kherson urban hromada. On 17 July 2020, as a result of nationwide administrative reforms, it, along with the rest of the hromada, became part of the newly formed Kherson Raion.

In March 2022, the village was occupied by Russia during the Russian invasion of Ukraine. It was liberated by Ukrainian forces in November 2022 during the 2022 Kherson counteroffensive.

== See also ==
- Prydniprovske
