= Nemonovo =

Nemonovo Немоново
- Village
- Location within Vologda Oblast Location within Russia
- Coordinates: 60°33′N 46°11′E
- Country: Russia
- Region: Vologda Oblast
- District: Velikoustyugsky District
- Time zone: UTC+3:00

Nemonovo (Russian: Немоново) is a rural locality (a village) in Nizhneshardengskoye Rural Settlement, Velikoustyugsky District, Vologda Oblast, Russia. The population was 2 as of 2002.

== Geography ==
Nemonovo is located 28 km southwest of Veliky Ustyug (the district's administrative centre) by road. Peganovo is the nearest rural locality.
