= Central Bridge (Dnipro) =

Central Bridge Центральний (Новий) міст
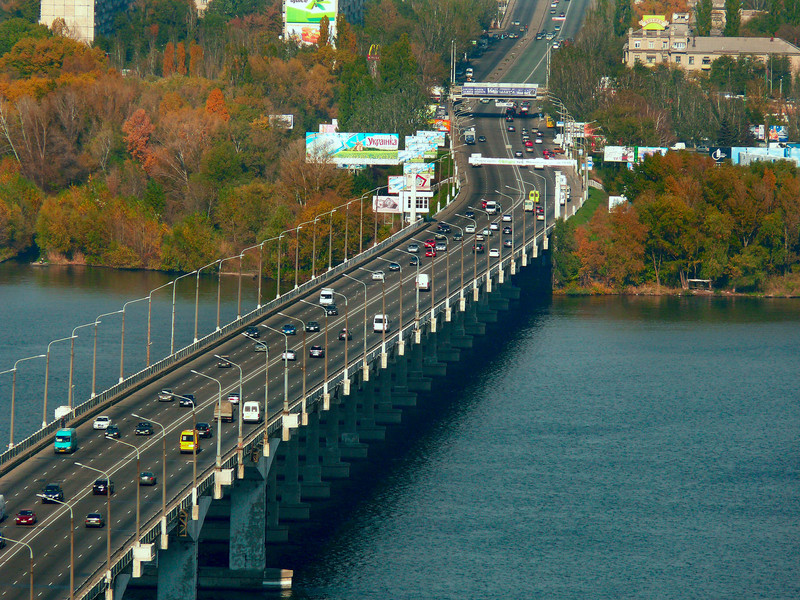
- Coordinates: 48.4765°N 35.0562°E
- Carries: Automobiles
- Crosses: Dnipro
- Locale: Dnipro, Ukraine
- Official name: Centralny Bridge
- Other name(s): Novy Bridge

Characteristics
- Total length: 1,478 m (4,849 ft)
- Width: 21 m (69 ft)

History
- Designer: Yevhen Teteruk (Dniprohiprotrans)
- Constructed by: "Mostostroi" (Ministry of Transport Construction of the USSR)
- Construction start: 1964
- Opened: 1966

Statistics
- Daily traffic: 2 way (3 lanes each way)

Centralny (Novy) Bridge (Ukrainian: Центральний (Новий) міст) is a bridge over river Dnipro in the city of Dnipro, Ukraine connecting right and left banks of Dnipro and is a continuation of Slobozhanskyi prospekt that stretches over to the Dnipro city centre. Built in 1966, the bridge was originally named as the 50th Anniversary of the Great October (Ukrainian: Міст імені 50-річчя Великого Жовтня).

The bridge is also known as Novyi (New) bridge, a name which it received as becoming an alternative crossing to the older Amursky Bridge located not far up the stream. At the left bank of Dnipro, the bridge travels between neighborhood Sonyachny and city park Sahaidak. Entering the city center on the right bank, the bridge transitions into a city street, vulystia Kotsiubynskoho.

== See also ==
- Bridges in Dnipro
