= Dachi, Ukraine =

Dachi Дачі
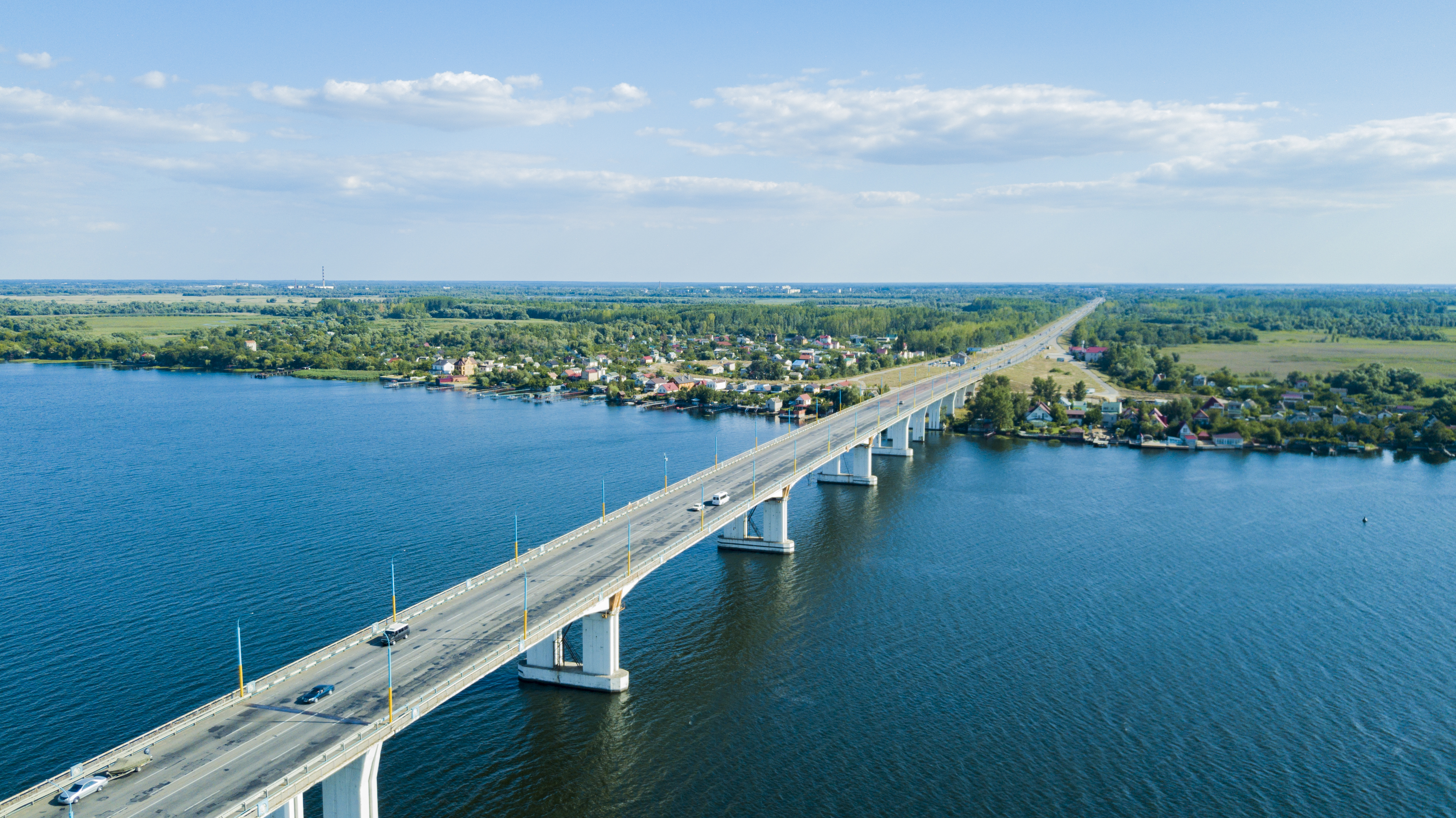
- An aerial view of the Antonivka Road Bridge, with Dachi on the far bank
- Interactive map of Dachi
- Location within Kherson Oblast Location within Ukraine
- Coordinates: 46°39′49.88″N 32°43′24.62″E
- Country: Ukraine
- Oblast: Kherson Oblast
- Raion: Kherson Raion

Dachi (Ukrainian: Дачі) is an unincorporated settlement in southern Ukraine on the left bank of the Dnipro river. It is located 8 kilometres (5.0 mi) from the city of Kherson, within the territory of Kherson Raion, Kherson Oblast. It is located near the Antonivka Road Bridge. It is a vacation town, where many of the city's wealthier residents own summer homes (dachas).

== History ==
=== Russian invasion of Ukraine ===
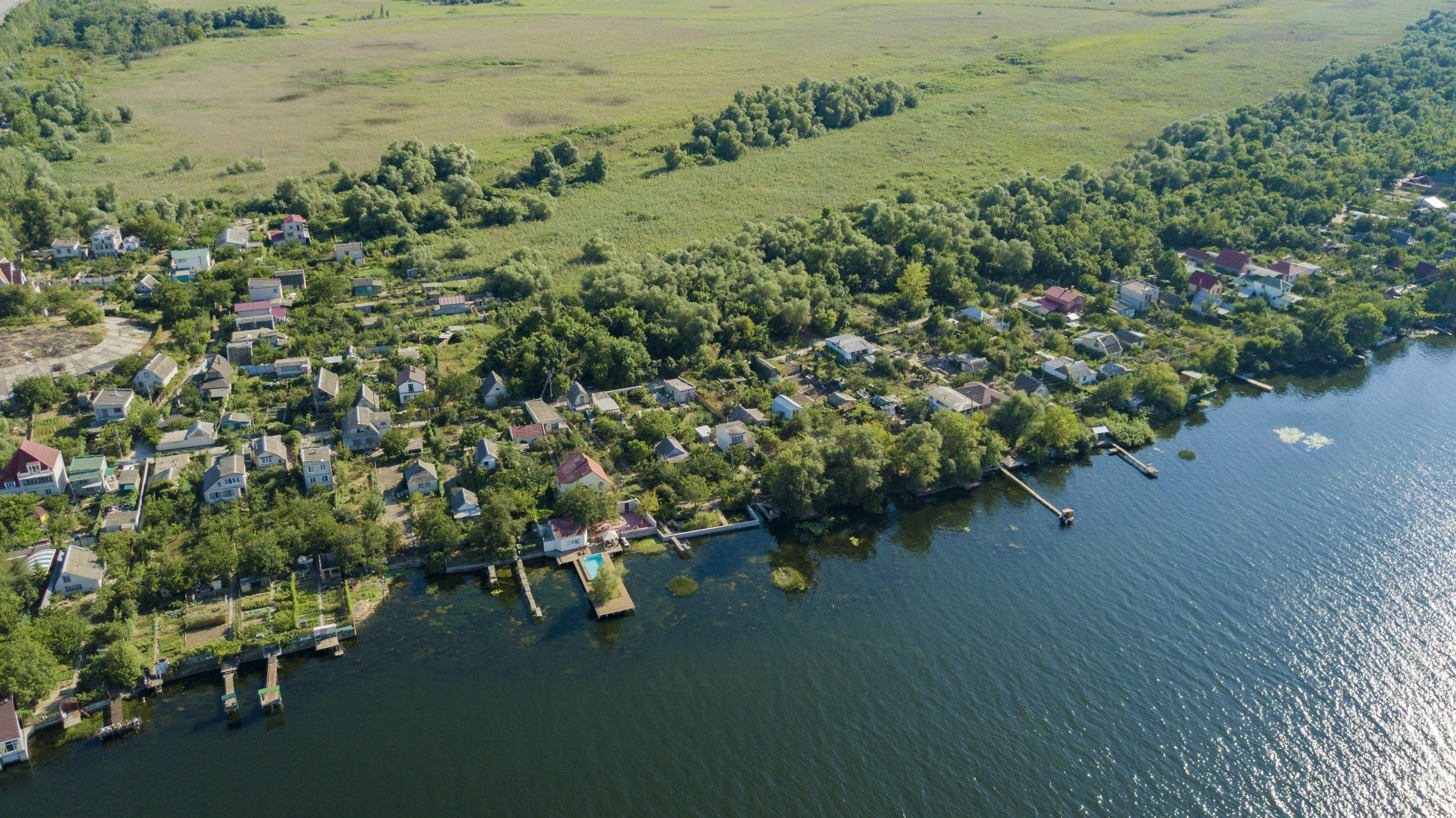
Dachas just west of the Antonivka bridge at Dachi

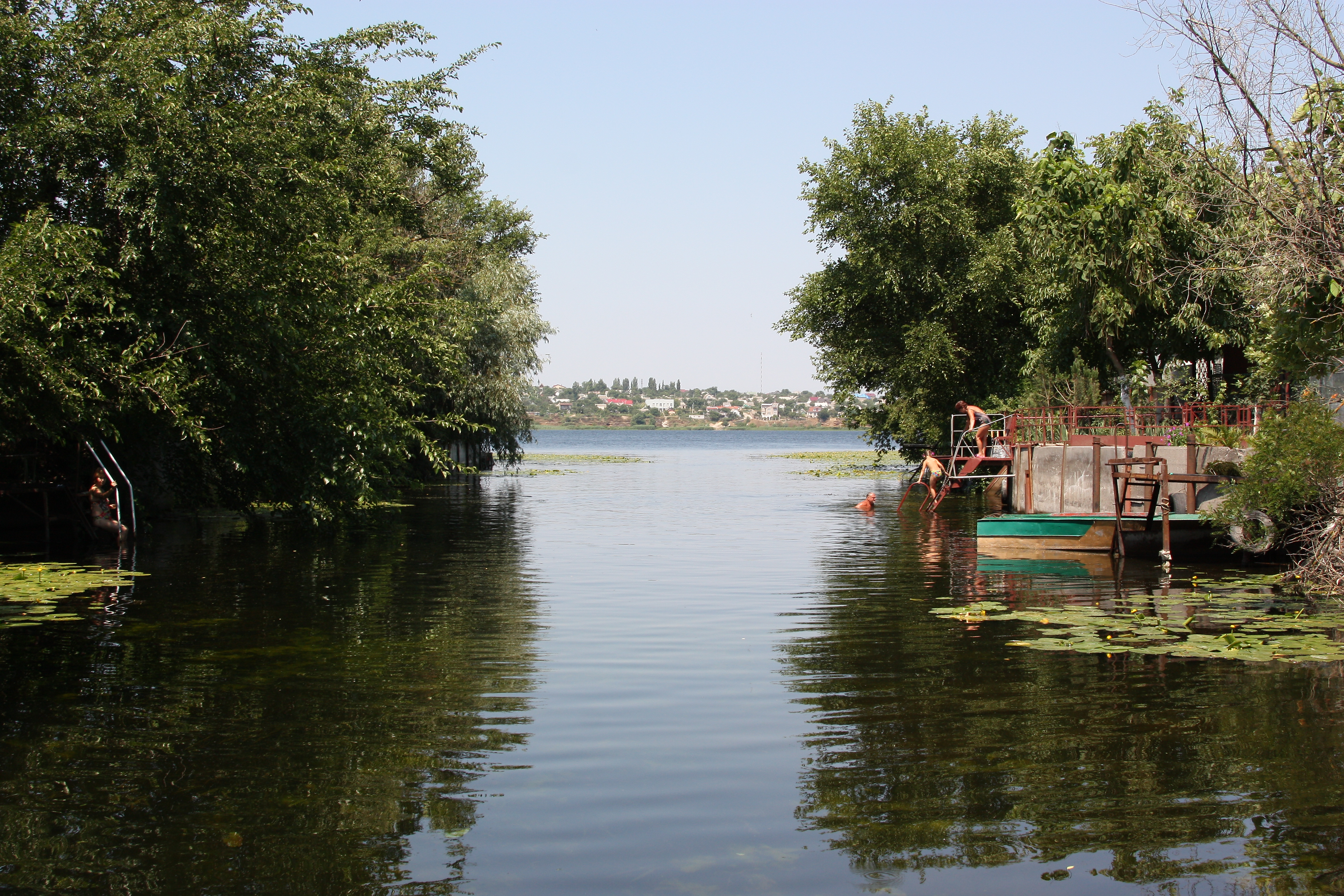
Locals swimming in Dachi in 2011

During the 2022 Russian invasion of Ukraine, the village was captured by Russian forces as part of the Southern offensive.

On April 23, 2023, it was reported by the Institute for the Study of War and the Associated Press that the village had been liberated by a Ukrainian incursion during the Dnieper campaign on the night of April 20 and 21.

The Antonivsky island, on which the village is situated, was completely submerged after the Kakhovka Dam was destroyed on 6 June 2023. During the flooding, Russian forces looted the houses of the village, and scavenged the locals' boats for parts and engines. In late June Russian sources claimed that the village was recaptured by the Armed Forces of Ukraine during the 2023 counteroffensive.

Despite repeated claims from Russian authorities and propagandists, such as Igor Girkin, that Ukrainian forces had been removed from the Island, Russian forces retreated following the arrival of Ukrainian reinforcements on July 11. After withdrawing from Antonivsky island, Russian milbloggers called the retreat "justified" and "measured" citing the island's swampy nature and constant Ukrainian artillery bombardments as making the village heavily defensible.
