= Komyshany =

Rural locality in Kherson Oblast, Ukraine

Komyshany Комишани
- Rural settlement
- Location in Kherson Oblast Location in Ukraine
- Country: Ukraine
- Oblast: Kherson Oblast
- Raion: Kherson Raion
- Hromada: Kherson urban hromada
- Established: 1801

Area
  - Total: 2.95 km^{2} (1.14 sq mi)

Population (2022)
  - Total: 6,737
  - Density: 2,280/km^{2} (5,910/sq mi)
- Time zone: UTC+2 (EET)
  - Summer (DST): UTC+3 (EEST)

Komyshany (Ukrainian: Комишани; Russian: Камышаны) is a rural settlement in Kherson Raion, Kherson Oblast, southern Ukraine. It is essentially a west suburb of the city of Kherson and is located on the right bank of the Dnieper Delta. Komyshany belongs to Kherson urban hromada, one of the hromadas of Ukraine. It has a population of 6,737 (2022 estimate).

== History ==
Until 18 July 2020, Komyshany belonged to Kherson Municipality. The municipality as an administrative unit was abolished in July 2020 as part of the administrative reform of Ukraine, which reduced the number of raions of Kherson Oblast to five. The area of Kherson Municipality was merged into Kherson Raion.

Until 26 January 2024, Komyshany was designated urban-type settlement. On this day, a new law entered into force which abolished this status, and Komyshany became a rural settlement.

== Economy ==
=== Transportation ===
The closest railway station is in Kherson. Komyshany is connected by road with Kherson where it has access to the Ukrainian road network.

== See also ==
- Russian occupation of Kherson Oblast
