= Antonivka, Kherson Raion, Kherson Oblast =

Rural locality in Kherson Oblast, Ukraine

Antonivka Антонівка
- Rural settlement
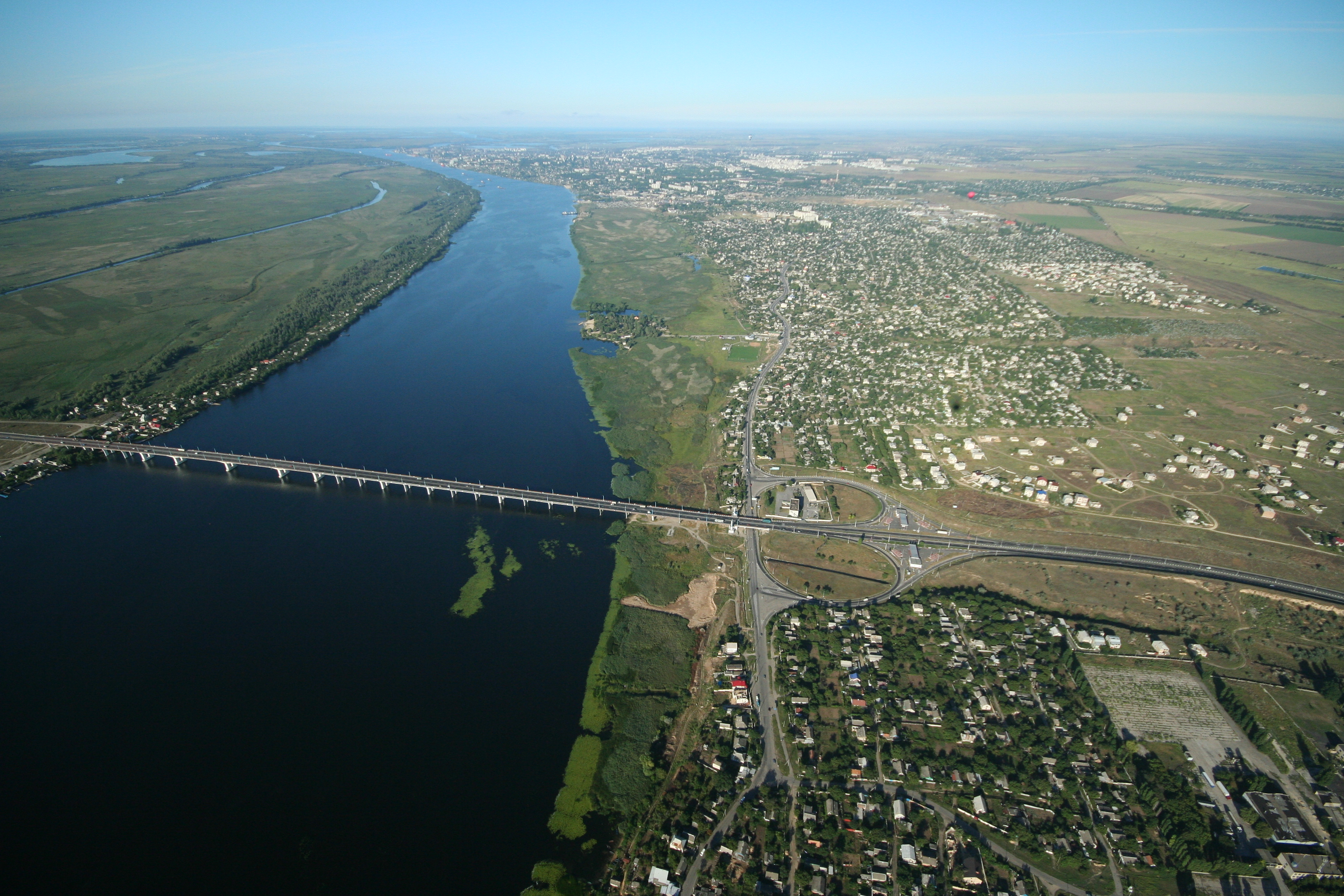
- Aerial view
- Interactive map of Antonivka
- Location in Kherson Oblast Location in Ukraine
- Coordinates: 46°40′51″N 32°44′09″E
- Country: Ukraine
- Oblast: Kherson Oblast
- Raion: Kherson Raion
- Hromada: Kherson urban hromada

Area
  - Total: 4.6 km^{2} (1.8 sq mi)
- Elevation: 9 m (30 ft)

Population (2022)
  - Total: 12,619
  - Estimate (2025): ~600
  - Density: 2,700/km^{2} (7,100/sq mi)
- Time zone: UTC+2 (EET)
  - Summer (DST): UTC+3 (EEST)
- Postal code: 73486

Antonivka (Ukrainian: Антонівка, pronounced [ɐnˈtɔn⁽ʲ⁾iu̯kɐ]; Russian: Антоновка, romanized: Antonovka) is a rural settlement in Kherson Raion, Kherson Oblast, southern Ukraine. It is a northeastern suburb of Kherson and is located on the right bank of the Dnieper. Antonivka belongs to Kherson urban hromada, one of the hromadas of Ukraine. It has a population of 12,619 (2022 estimate).

It has historically been an important transport hub. Among other things, Antonivka is the closest settlement to the Antonivka Road Bridge, which is named after the town.

== History ==
Antonivka is first mentioned on a map from 1822 in the times of the Russian Empire, where it was mentioned as being founded by migrants from Poltava Governorate. It received urban-type settlement status in 1963.

Until 18 July 2020, Antonivka belonged to Kherson Municipality. The municipality as an administrative unit was abolished in July 2020 as part of the administrative reform of Ukraine, which reduced the number of raions of Kherson Oblast to five. The area of Kherson Municipality was merged into Kherson Raion.

In 2022, during the Russian invasion of Ukraine, Antonivka was captured and occupied by Russia. It was eventually retaken during Ukraine's 2022 Kherson counteroffensive. It has still been bombed by Russia since its liberation, and the population has shrunk.

Until 26 January 2024, Antonivka was designated urban-type settlement. On this day, a new law entered into force which abolished this status, and Antonivka became a rural settlement.

== Economy ==
=== Industry ===
The largest enterprise in the town is a glassworks plant. There is also a winery, a bread factory, and a non-alcoholic beverages plant.

=== Transportation ===
The Antonivka railway station is adjacent to the settlement. It is on the railway which used to connect Kherson with Dzhankoi; however, after the Russian annexation of Crimea in 2014, the trains only run as far as Vadym, close to the border with Crimea. There is infrequent passenger traffic.

The settlement is built in the road network of Kherson. In particular, it has access to Highway M17, which runs to the border with Crimea and Highway M14, which connects Kherson and Melitopol.

Antonivka is the closest settlement to the important Antonivka Road Bridge, which is named after the town. However, the bridge was blown up during the Russian invasion of Ukraine in 2022.

== Demographics ==
Antonivka is a multi-ethnic town. As of 1999, it had a population of 34,300 people. When asked about their ethnic background, 55% said they were Ukrainians and 30% said they were Russians, with the remainder including Tatars, Armenians, Romani, Germans, and Greeks, among others. By the beginning of 2022, its population had greatly shrunk to 12,619 people.
