= Merefa-Kherson bridge =

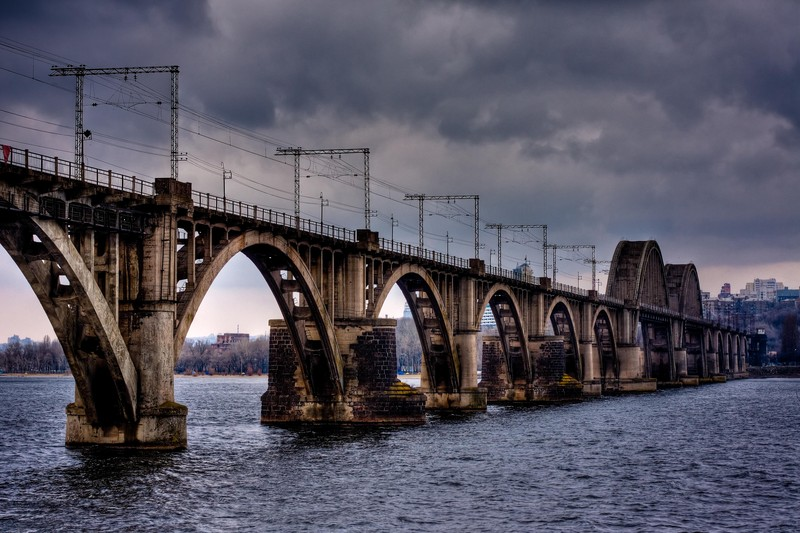
- Coordinates: 48.4674°N 35.0827°E
- Carried: Merefa-Kherson railway line
- Crossed: Dnieper river
- Official name: Мерефо-Херсонський міст

Characteristics
- Material: Steel and reinforced concrete
- Total length: 1,627 metres (5,338 ft)
- Longest span: 2 × 109 metres (358 ft)

History
- Construction start: 1912
- Construction end: 1932, 1951
- Opened: 1932, 21 December
- Collapsed: 1914, 1940, 1944 (destroyed by troops)

Location
- Interactive map of Merefa-Kherson bridge

Railroad bridge on the map closer to confluence with Samara river

The Merefa-Kherson bridge (Ukrainian: Мерефо-Херсонський міст, romanized: Merefo-Khersonskyi mist; Russian: Мерефо-Херсонский мост, romanized: Merefo-Khersonskiy most) is a 1,600 m (5,249.3 ft) single track railway bridge crossing the Dnieper in Dnipro and part of the railway line between cities of Merefa and Kherson.

The second oldest bridge in the city, and the first railway-arch bridge in the Soviet Union, at the time of its construction it was the longest reinforced concrete arched bridge in Europe.

It crosses from the right bank of the Dnieper, over the "Bishop's Channel" ("Архієрейська протока") and Monastyrskyi Island, continuing over the main body of the river to its left bank.

== History ==
Plans were completed during the empire period for a rail bridge over the river in the city known, at that time as Ekaterinoslav (Russian: Екатериносла́в, Ukrainian: Катериносла́в), in order to carry the railway line connecting Merefa in the northeast with Kherson on the Black Sea coast. The end stations of the railway line also gave their name to the Merefa-Kherson bridge.

Work started in 1912, using plans drawn up by the bridge engineer Grigory Perederiy, but was interrupted by the outbreak of war two years later. The project was delayed further by the unrest that followed the October Revolution and the Russian Civil War. Work resumed in 1929 or 1930. An innovation was the use of reinforced concrete. Thirty-five reinforced concrete arches and both the main 52 meter spans were produced in just seven months. The final cubic meter of concrete was poured on 24 October 1932. The bridge entered into service less than two months later, on 21 December.

During the Second World War the bridge was rendered unusable by the retreating Red Army. The occupying German forces put it back into service and renamed it after Field Marshal von Kleist, who appeared in person for the formal opening of "his" bridge. However, when it was the turn of the German army to retreat, they destroyed the bridge again.

After the war ended in 1945, the bridge was rebuilt. The steel trusses of the main spans that had been a feature of the 1932 bridge were in 1948 replaced with concrete arches. By 1951 the bridge had acquired its present appearance.
