= Monastyrskyi Island =

Island on the Dnieper, in Dnipro, Ukraine

Coordinates: 48°27′48″N 35°04′47″E

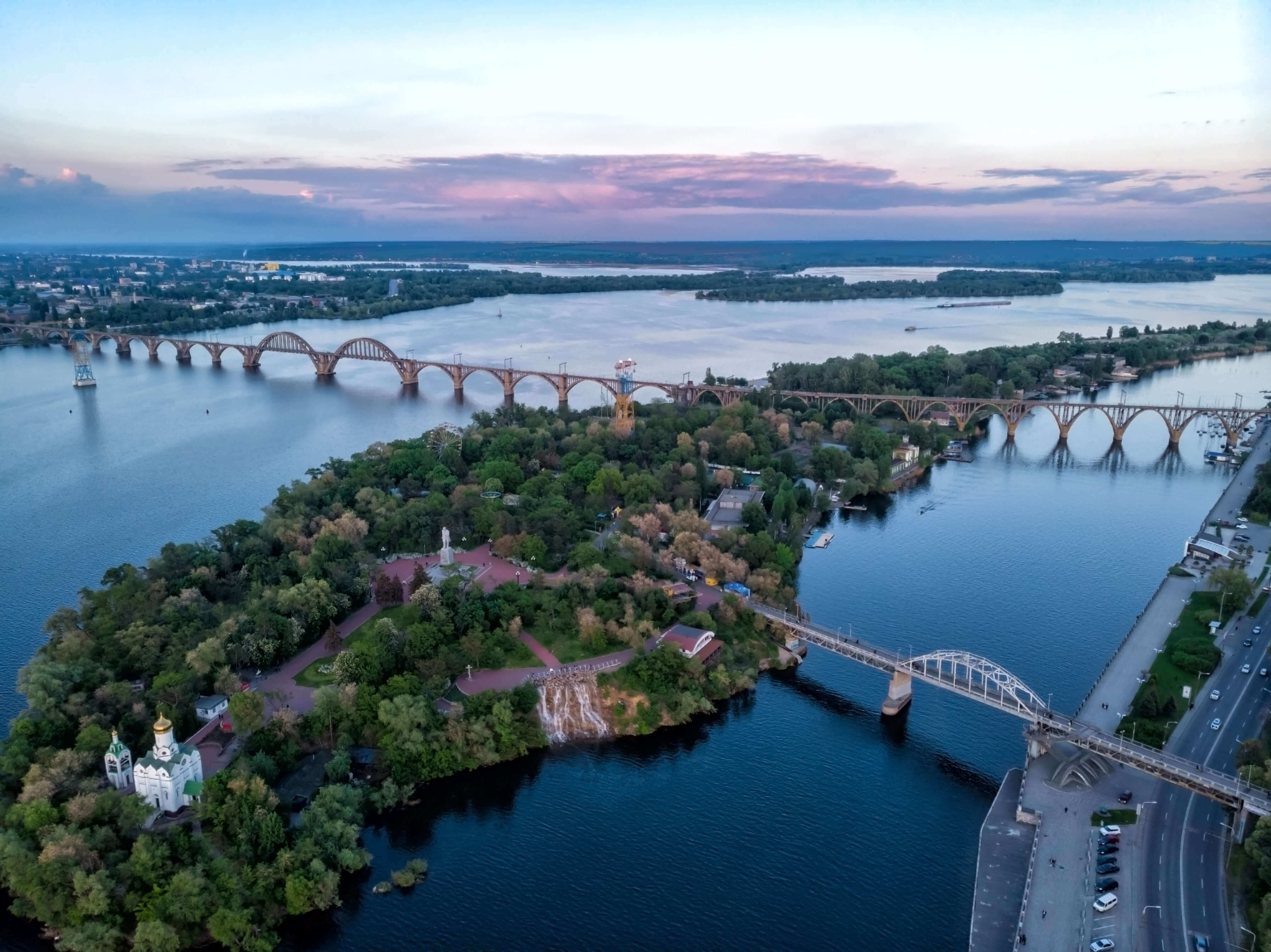

Geography
- Location: Dnieper River
- Area: 0.4 km^{2} (0.15 sq mi)

Monastyrskyi Island (Ukrainian: Монастирський острів, romanized: Monastyrskyi ostriv) is a small island in the Sobornyi district of the Ukrainian city of Dnipro.

== Description ==
Monastyrskyi Island is located within the boundaries of the Sobornyi district of the Ukrainian city of Dnipro near the right bank of the Dnieper River. It is covered with granite rocks to the west which gradually turns into a sandy spit in the east of the island.

Part of the island belongs to the Taras Shevchenko Park. The island is connected to the city by a pedestrian bridge at the northern end.

== Early settlement ==
According to archeological finds, in the Paleolithic period (7—3 thousand Anno Domini) human settlements appear on the island. In 1961 there were found several scraps and sharpener of ancient Stone Age by archaeologists.

The island got its name in the ninth century because of an unconfirmed belief that in that century Byzantine monks founded a monastery on the island, which in 1240 was destroyed by the Mongol-Tatars. In 1747 Ukrainian Cossacks did build a monastery on the island.

== Monuments and memorials ==
The first monument to the ukrainian political, scientific and artistical figure Taras Shevchenko (1814 – 1861) on the island appeared in the mid-1920s (the exact date has been lost).

In 1929 the island was officially renamed to Komsomolsky Island (Ukrainian: Комсомольський острів), after the Komsomol political youth organization of the Soviet Union. (Note: Ukraine was part of the Soviet Union from 1920 until Ukraine declared its independence from the Soviet Union on 24 August 1991.)

In the 1930s the island had an "allée of writers" where several busts of prominent Ukrainian and Russian writers were located, including a simple gypsum bust of Shevchenko. These two monuments did not survive the heavy fighting in Dnipropetrovsk during World War II.

A new monument to Shevchenko was opened in 1949, only the pedestal has survived from this monument.

The main alley on the island in the 1950s was completed by a monument to Joseph Stalin in the middle of a large flowerbed.

In 1958 a new monument to Shevchenko was installed on the island that was unveiled on 5 November 1959. This monument is several times larger than its 1949 predecessor. This 1949 monument was then reinstalled in the Shevchenko neighborhood in Dnipro's Samarskyi District where it was located until October 2007, when it was destroyed. Since then, the 1959 monument has become one of the city's most recognized landmarks.

There is also a memorial cross to the Byzantine monks, erected in 1994.

== Post-independence ==
In 1999 an Orthodox church of St. Nicholas was built on the northern part of the island.

On 24 November 2015 the island was officially renamed Monastyrskyi Island. It was renamed to its current name to comply with decommunization law.

== Sources ==
- Magocsi, Paul Robert (2010). A History of Ukraine: The Land and Its Peoples. University of Toronto Press. ISBN 978-1-4426-1021-7.
