= 2014 Russian annexation of Crimea =

2014 annexation of Ukrainian territory

- Part of the Russo-Ukrainian War
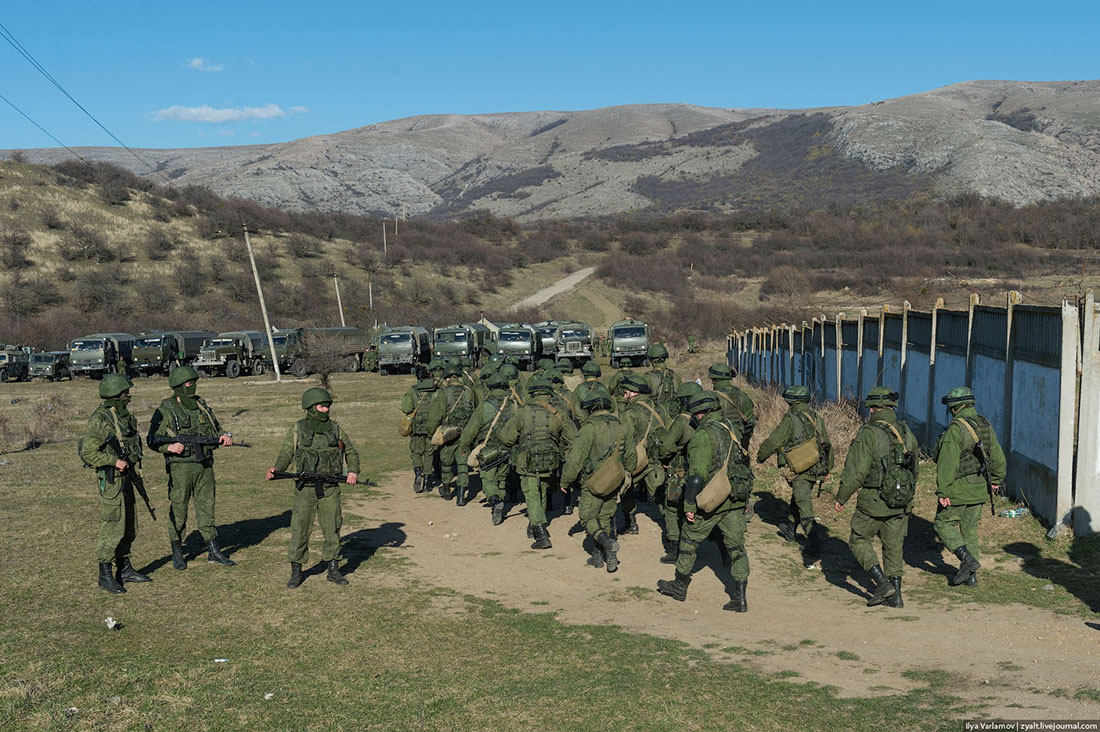
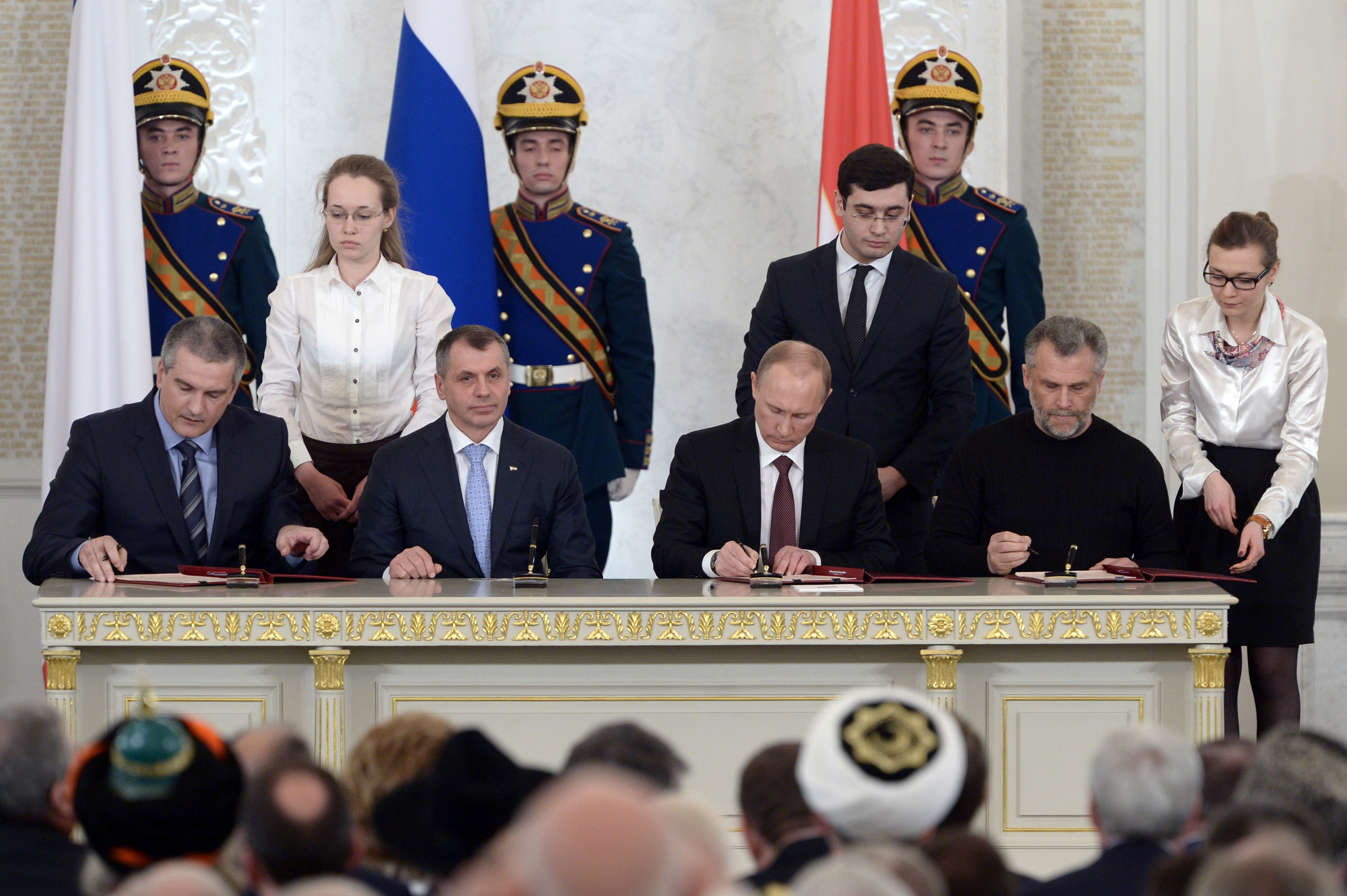
- Top: Unmarked Russian troops occupying Crimea, 3 March 2014. Bottom: Vladimir Putin signs the treaty of accession with Russian-installed Crimean leaders in Moscow, 18 March 2014.
Date	Annexation: 18 March 2014; Military operation: 27 February (Note: There are "some contradictions and inherent problems" regarding the date on which the Russian operation began. Russia first deployed troops in Crimea on 26 February, seizing roads between their base in Sevastopol and the capital of Simferopol. The Ukrainian Government maintains, and the European Court of Human Rights agrees, that Russia controlled Crimea from 27 February 2014, when unmarked Russian special forces took control of its political institutions. The Russian Government later made 27 February "Special Operations Forces Day". A Ukrainian law adopted by Verkhovna Rada on 15 April 2014 designated 19 February 2014 as the "beginning of Russian occupation in separate Ukrainian territories", as on that date Russian forces established control over the Schmidt Gas Deposit located on the Ukrainian continental shelf in the Black Sea not far from Crimea. In 2015, the Ukrainian parliament officially designated 20 February 2014 as "the beginning of the temporary occupation of Crimea and Sevastopol by Russia", citing the date inscribed on the Russian medal "For the Return of Crimea". In 2018, Russian Foreign Minister Sergey Lavrov claimed that the earlier "start date" on the medal was due to a "technical misunderstanding". President Putin stated in a film about the annexation that he ordered the operation to "restore" Crimea to Russia following an all-night emergency meeting on 22–23 February 2014.) – 26 March 2014 (3 weeks and 6 days)
Location	Crimea
Result	Russian victory

Belligerents
Russia	Ukraine

Commanders and leaders
(Russia) Vladimir Putin; (Russia) Dmitry Medvedev; (Russia) Sergei Shoigu; (Russia) Valery Gerasimov; (Russia) Aleksandr Vitko; (Russia) Igor Girkin; (Republic of Crimea (Russia)) Sergey Aksyonov; (Republic of Crimea (Russia)) Vladimir Konstantinov; (Sevastopol) Alexey Chaly	(Ukraine) Oleksandr Turchynov; (Ukraine) Arseniy Yatsenyuk; (Ukraine) Ihor Tenyukh; (Ukraine) Mykhailo Kutsyn; (Ukraine) Serhiy Hayduk; (Ukraine) Arsen Avakov; (Ukraine) Valentyn Nalyvaichenko; (Autonomous Republic of Crimea) Anatolii Mohyliov; Refat Chubarov

Units involved
Based in Crimea, elements of Navy: 510th Naval Inf Bde (Feodosiia); 810th Naval Inf Bde (Simferopol); Deployed to Crimea, elements of Ground Forces: 18th Mot Rifle Bde (Grozny); 291st Artillery Bde (Troitskaya); (GRU command): 3rd Spetsnaz Bde (Tolyatti); 10th Spetsnaz Bde (Krasnodar); 16th Spetsnaz Bde (Tambov); 22nd Spetsnaz Bde (Stepnoy); 25th Spetsnaz Rgt (Stavropol); 45th Spetsnaz Rgt (Kubinka, Moscow); Airborne: 7th Air Assault Div (Novorossiysk); 31st Air Assault Bde (Ulyanovsk); Navy: 382nd Naval Inf Bn (Temryuk); 727th Naval Inf Bn (Astrakhan); Special Operations Forces: SOF Command (Prokhladny)	Armed forces Navy: 36th Coastal Def Bde (at Perevalne); 1st Naval Inf Bn (Feodosiia); 56th Gds Bn (Sevastopol); 501st Naval Inf Bn (Kerch); 406th Artillery Bde (Simferopol); 37th Comms and Control Rgt (Sevastopol); 72nd Psychological and Information Warfare Center; Paramilitary Interior troops: 9th Bde (Simferopol); 15th Bn (Yevpatoriia); 18th Spec Mot Militia Bn (Haspra); 42nd Operational Rgt (Sevastopol); 47th Bde (Feodosiia); Border guards: Special-Purpose Border Guard Bn (Yalta)

Strength
Protesters: 20,000 (Sevastopol); 10,000 (Simferopol); Volunteer units: 5,000 (Sevastopol); 1,700 (Simferopol); Russian military forces: 20,000–30,000 troops	Protesters: 4,000–10,000 (Simferopol); Ukrainian military forces: 5,000–22,000 troops; 40,000 reservists, partly mobilised (outside Crimea)

Casualties and losses
1 Crimean SDF trooper killed	2 soldiers killed; 60–80 soldiers detained; 9,268 military servicemen and 7,050 civilian employees defected
- 2 civilian deaths (during the protests), 1 civilian killed (by Crimean SDF under command of a former Russian serviceman)

In February and March 2014, Russia invaded the Crimean Peninsula of Ukraine, occupied it, and then annexed it after an illegitimate referendum. This took place amid the uncertainty that immediately followed Ukraine's Revolution of Dignity. The invasion marked the beginning of the Russo-Ukrainian war. Crimea's annexation has been described as an instance of modern Russian imperialism. It was the first time since World War II that a European country had annexed part of another, and some analysts see the annexation as the beginning of a Second Cold War between Russia and the West.

The events in Kyiv that ousted Ukrainian president Viktor Yanukovych on 22 February 2014 sparked both pro- and anti-separatist demonstrations in Crimea. At the same time, Russian president Vladimir Putin told his security chiefs to begin work on "returning Crimea to Russia". On 27 February, Russian special forces without insignia began seizing strategic sites across Crimea. Russia denied involvement at the time, but Putin later admitted that they were Russian troops. As the armed men occupied Crimea's parliament, it dismissed the Crimean government, installed the pro-Russian Aksyonov government, and announced a referendum on Crimea's status. The referendum was held under Russian occupation and did not have an option to keep the status quo. According to the Russian-installed authorities, the result was overwhelmingly in favor of joining Russia. The next day, 17 March 2014, Crimea's authorities declared independence and requested to join Russia. Russia incorporated Crimea on 18 March 2014 as the Republic of Crimea and federal city of Sevastopol. Russia also claimed an exclusive economic zone in the Black Sea around Crimea. This zone is three times bigger than the peninsula and holds vast natural gas and oil reserves. Russia militarized the peninsula and warned against any intervention.

Ukraine and many other countries condemned the annexation as breaking international law and Russian agreements to respect the territorial integrity of Ukraine. The United Nations General Assembly rejected the referendum and annexation, adopting a resolution affirming the "territorial integrity of Ukraine within its internationally recognised borders", and deeming Crimea to be under Russian occupation. The other members of the G8 suspended Russia from the group and imposed sanctions on Russia. NATO also suspended co-operation with Russia.

The Russian government opposes the "annexation" label, with Putin defending the referendum as complying with the principle of the self-determination. In his speech marking the annexation, Putin said Crimea had always been Russian and should never have become part of an independent Ukraine.

== Other names ==
=== In Ukraine ===
The names of the Crimean annexation vary. In Ukraine, the annexation is known as the temporary occupation of the Autonomous Republic of Crimea and Sevastopol by Russia (Ukrainian: тимчасова окупація Автономної Республіки Крим і Севастополя Росією, romanized: tymchasova okupatsiia Avtonomnoi Respubliky Krym i Sevastopolia Rosiieiu), the illegal occupation of the Autonomous Republic of Crimea, the fall of Crimea, and the invasion of Crimea.

=== In Russia ===
In the Russian Federation, it is also known as the accession of Crimea to the Russian Federation (Russian: присоединение Крыма к Российской Федерации, romanized: prisoyedineniye Kryma k Rossiyskoy Federatsii), the return of Crimea (Russian: возвращение Крыма, romanized: vozvrashcheniye Kryma), and the reunification of Crimea.

== Background ==
Crimea was part of the Crimean Khanate from 1441 until it was annexed by the Russian Empire in 1783 by a decree of Catherine the Great.

After the downfall of Russian empire in 1917 during the first stages of the Russian Civil War there were a series of short-lived independent governments (Crimean People's Republic, Crimean Regional Government, Crimean SSR). They were followed by White Russian governments (General Command of the Armed Forces of South Russia and later South Russian Government).

In October 1921, the Bolshevik Russian SFSR gained control of the peninsula and instituted the Crimean Autonomous Soviet Socialist Republic as a member of Russian Federation. In the following year Crimea joined the Soviet Union as a part of Russia (the RSFSR).

After the Second World War and the 1944 deportation of all of the indigenous Crimean Tatars by the Soviet government, the Crimean ASSR was stripped of its autonomy in 1946 and downgraded to the status of an oblast of the Russian SFSR. In 1954, the Crimean Oblast was transferred from the Russian SFSR to the Ukrainian SSR by decree of the Presidium of the Supreme Soviet of the Soviet Union to commemorate the 300th anniversary of Ukraine's union with Russia. In 1989, under Gorbachev's perestroika, the Supreme Soviet declared that the deportation of the Crimean Tatars under Stalin had been illegal and the mostly Muslim ethnic group was allowed to return to Crimea.

In 1990, the Soviet of the Crimean Oblast proposed the restoration of the Crimean ASSR. The oblast conducted a referendum in 1991, which asked whether Crimea should be elevated into a signatory of the New Union Treaty (that is, become a union republic on its own). By that time, though, the dissolution of the Soviet Union was well underway. The Crimean ASSR was restored for less than a year as part of Ukrainian SSR before the restoration of Ukrainian independence. Newly independent Ukraine maintained Crimea's autonomous status, while the Supreme Council of Crimea affirmed the peninsula's "sovereignty" as a part of Ukraine.

The confrontation between the government of Ukraine and Crimea deteriorated between 1992 and 1995. In May 1992 the regional parliament declared an independent "Crimean republic." In June 1992, the parties reached a compromise, that Crimea would have considerable autonomy but remain part of Ukraine. Yuri Meshkov, a leader of the Russian movement was elected President of Crimea in 1994 and his party won a majority in the regional parliamentary elections in the same year. The pro-Russian movement was then weakened by internal disagreements and in March 1995 the Ukrainian government gained the upper hand. The office of the elected President of Crimea was abolished and a loyal head of region was installed instead of Meshkov; the 1992 constitution and a number of local laws were repealed. According to Gwendolyn Sasse the conflict was defused due to Crimea's multi-ethnic population, fractures within the pro-Russian movement, Kyiv's policy of avoiding escalation and the lack of active support from Russia.

During the 1990s, the serious dispute over control of the Black Sea Fleet and Crimean naval facilities, as well as the status of Crimea in whole were source of tensions between Russia and Ukraine. In 1992, Vladimir Lukin, then chairman of the Russian Duma's Committee on Foreign Affairs, suggested that to pressure Ukraine to give up its claim to the Black Sea Fleet, Russia should question Ukrainian control over Crimea. In 1998 the Partition Treaty divided the fleet and gave Russia a naval base in Sevastopol, and the Treaty of Friendship recognized the inviolability of existing borders. However, in 2003 Tuzla Island conflict issues over maritime border resurfaced.

In September 2008, the Ukrainian Foreign Minister Volodymyr Ohryzko accused Russia of giving Russian passports to the population in Crimea, and described it as a "real problem", given Russia's declared policy of military intervention abroad to protect Russian citizens.

On 24 August 2009, anti-Ukrainian demonstrations were held in Crimea by ethnic Russian residents. Sergei Tsekov (of the Russian Bloc and then deputy speaker of the Crimean parliament) said then that he hoped that Russia would treat Crimea the same way as it had treated South Ossetia and Abkhazia. Crimea is populated by an ethnic Russian majority and a minority of both ethnic Ukrainians and Crimean Tatars, and thus demographically possessed one of Ukraine's largest ethnically Russian populations.

As early as in 2010, some analysts already speculated that the Russian government had irredentist plans. Taras Kuzio said that "Russia has an even more impossible time recognizing Ukraine's sovereignty over the Crimea and the port of Sevastopol – as seen by public opinion in Russia, statements by politicians, including members of the ruling United Russia party, experts and journalists". In 2011, William Varettoni wrote that "Russia wants to annex Crimea and is merely waiting for the right opportunity, most likely under the pretense of defending Russian brethren abroad".

=== Euromaidan and the Revolution of Dignity ===
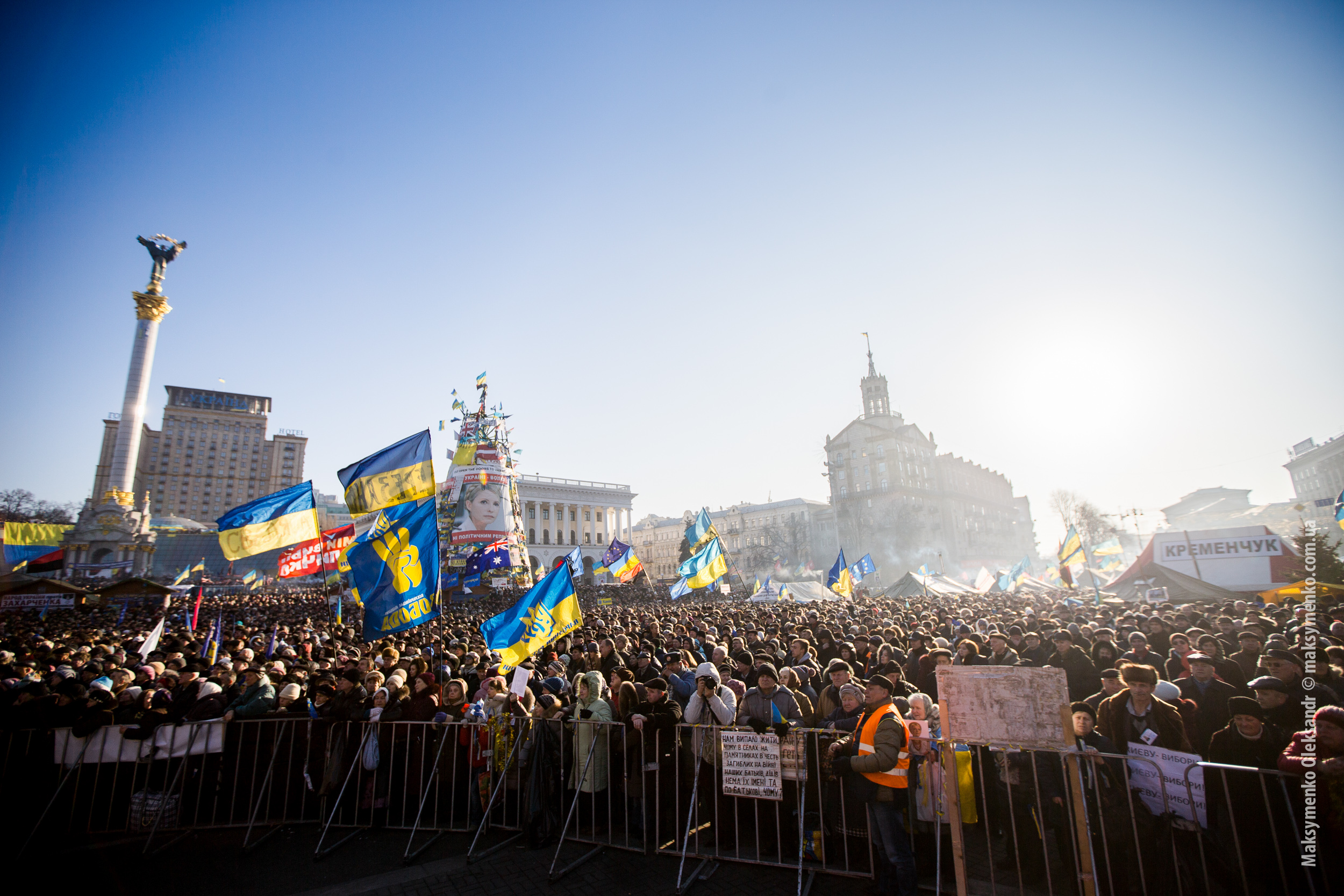
Euromaidan in Kyiv, 29 December 2013

The Euromaidan protest movement began in Kyiv in late November 2013 after President Viktor Yanukovych, of the Party of Regions, failed to sign the Ukraine–European Union Association Agreement. Yanukovych won the 2010 presidential election with strong support from voters in the Autonomous Republic of Crimea and southern and eastern Ukraine. The Crimean autonomous government strongly supported Yanukovych and condemned the protests, saying they were "threatening political stability in the country". The Crimean autonomous parliament said that it supported the government's decision to suspend negotiations on the pending association agreement and urged Crimeans to "strengthen friendly ties with Russian regions".

On 4 February 2014, the Presidium of the Supreme Council "promised" to consider holding a referendum on the peninsula's status. Speaker Vladimir Klychnikov asked to appeal to the Russian government to "guarantee the preservation of Crimean autonomy". The Security Service of Ukraine (SBU) responded by opening a criminal case to investigate the possible "subversion" of Ukraine's territorial integrity. On 20 February 2014, during a visit to Moscow, Chairman of the Supreme Council of Crimea Vladimir Konstantinov stated that the 1954 transfer of Crimea from the Russian Soviet Federative Socialist Republic to the Ukrainian Soviet Socialist Republic had been a mistake.

The Euromaidan protests came to a head in late February 2014, and Yanukovych and many of his ministers fled the capital on 22 February. After his flight, opposition parties and defectors from the Party of Regions put together a parliamentary quorum in the Verkhovna Rada (the Ukrainian parliament), and voted on 22 February to remove Yanukovych from his post on the grounds that he was unable to fulfill his duties. Arseniy Yatsenyuk was appointed by the Rada to serve as the head of a caretaker government until new presidential and parliament elections could be held. This new government was recognised internationally. Russian government and propaganda have described these events as a "coup d'état" and have said that the caretaker government was illegitimate, while researchers consider the subsequent annexation of Crimea to be a true military coup, because the Russian military seized Crimea's parliament and government buildings and instigated the replacement of its government with Russian proxies.

== Annexation ==
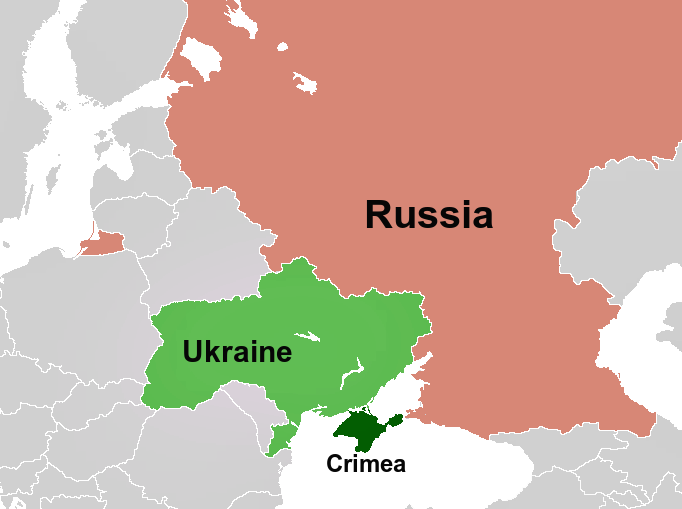
Crimea (dark green), Rest of Ukraine (light green) and Russia (light red) in Europe

=== Russian planning ===
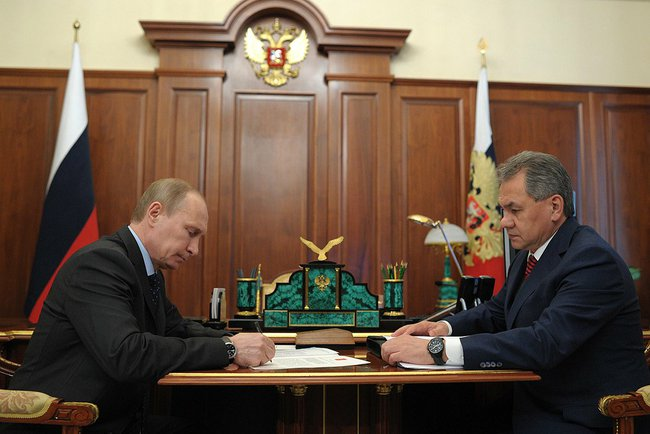
Russian President Vladimir Putin and his Defense Minister Sergei Shoigu in March 2014

At the end of January 2014, Russian oligarch Konstantin Malofeev travelled to Crimea with his head of security, former Federal Security Service (FSB) officer Igor Girkin (alias 'Strelkov'). Malofeev met with Vladimir Konstantinov, Chairman of the Supreme Council, asking him whether he would be willing to take "more drastic measures" to enforce Crimea's autonomy should there be a revolution. Konstantinov had already met with Nikolai Patrushev, head of the Security Council of Russia, in Moscow in December 2013 where he told Patrushev that if Yanukovych was overthrown, Crimea would be ready to break off and become part of Russia. At the end of January 2014, Konstantinov met with Vladislav Surkov, Putin's adviser on Ukraine. On 4 February, Konstantinov appealed to Putin to guard Crimean autonomy and began preparing a "survey" of Crimeans on what its status should be. Surkov visited Crimea on 14 February, where he might have tried to recruit Crimean prime minister, Anatolii Mohyliov, for the Russian cause.

In early February 2014, before the Ukrainian revolution, the Kremlin received a strategy paper outlining plans for the annexation of Crimea. It was reportedly part-written by Malofeev, and was published a year later by the Russian newspaper Novaya Gazeta. The documents said that the Ukrainian government and president Viktor Yanukovych were "totally bankrupt" and would not last. They proposed that Russia should foster separatism in Crimea and other eastern provinces, and should begin work on taking control of them. The documents outlined plans for starting pro-Russian protests and a public relations campaign to justify a Russian takeover.

On 21 February 2014, Ukrainian president Yanukovych secretly fled the capital. Russia's leadership worried that its naval base in Crimea might be at risk under a new Ukrainian government that was committed to closer ties with the West. On 22–23 February 2014, (Note: The date was given by Putin in Russian film commemorating the annexation of Crimea, however, the inscription on the Medal "For the Return of Crimea", awarded by the Russian Ministry of Defence state put 20 February as the starting date) Russian president Putin held an all-night meeting with security chiefs to discuss the crisis. At the end of that meeting, Putin said: "we must start working on returning Crimea to Russia".

The GRU and FSB then began organizing sympathizers in Crimea to ensure that when the operation began there would be armed "local self‑defense groups" on the streets for support. In January 2014, the city council of Sevastopol—home of Russia's naval base in Crimea—had called for the formation of "people's militia" units to "ensure firm defence" of the city from "extremism".

According to political scientist Daniel Treisman, Putin may have begun planning to take Crimea even before Yanukovych was ousted. A source close to the commander of the operation said that Russian special forces in the port of Novorossiysk and the Black Sea Fleet in Sevastopol had already been put on alert on 18 February. Participants in the operation were later awarded a medal "For the Return of Crimea", which is engraved with 20 February as the start date of the operation.

=== Early unrest ===
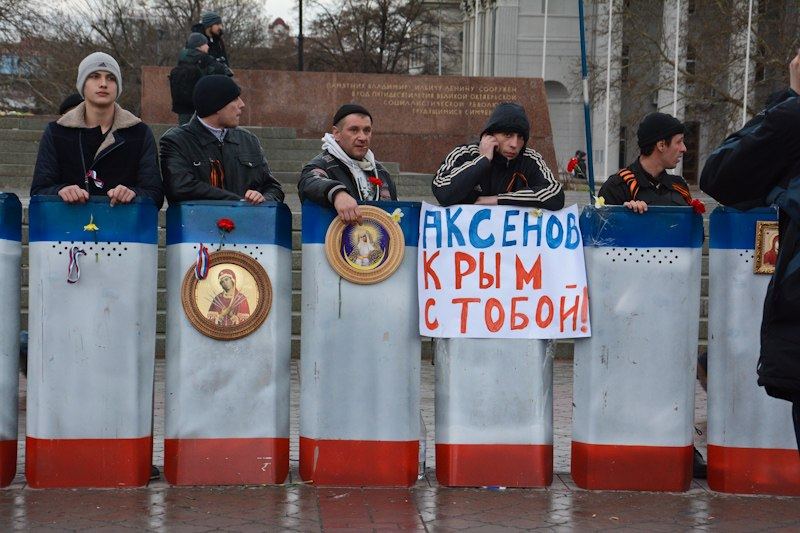
"Crimean self-defence forces", 2 March 2014

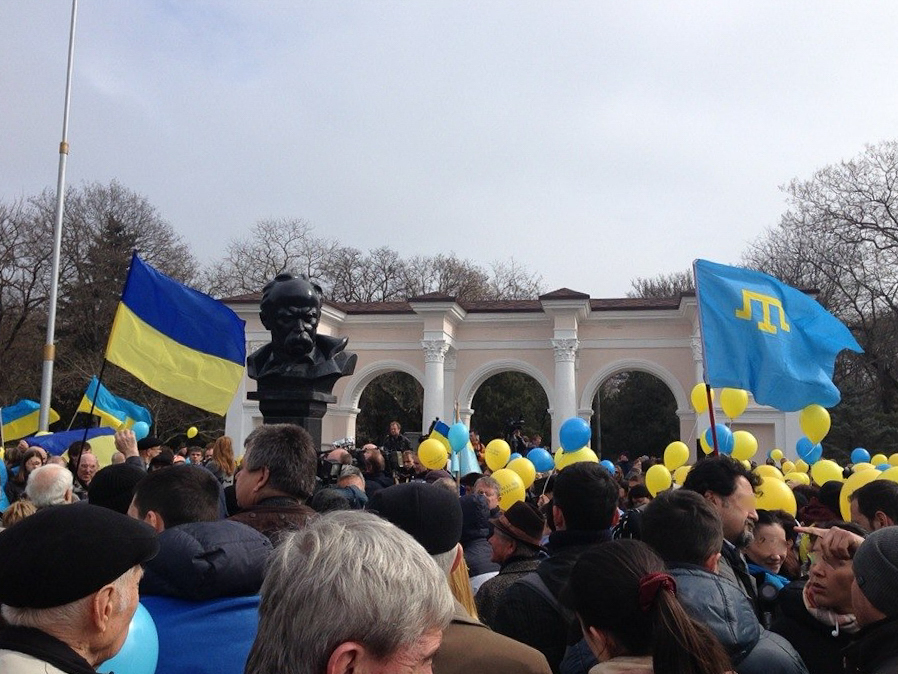
A pro-Ukrainian demonstration in Simferopol (Ukrainian flag on the left, Crimean Tatar flag on the right) during the Russian military intervention in Crimea, 9 March 2014

The February 2014 Revolution of Dignity that ousted Ukrainian president Viktor Yanukovych sparked a political crisis in Crimea, which initially manifested as demonstrations against the new interim Ukrainian government, but rapidly escalated.

In late February, thousands of Russian soldiers dressed as civilians joined the "Crimean self-defense" units, as did almost one thousand Kuban Cossacks from the North Caucasus. The activities of these groups were closely coordinated with Russian military forces and planned by Russian defense officials. Igor Girkin ('Strelkov') oversaw command of some of the units and their coordination with Russian security officials. Almost ten thousand people joined these "self-defense" units, but it is unclear how many were locals.

On 20 February several buses with Crimean license plates were stopped at a pro-Maidan checkpoint in a town in Cherkasy oblast. Their passengers were violently intimidated and some buses were burned. This incident was subsequently used by Russian propaganda which made unsubstantiated claims that the passengers were killed in gruesome ways.

The local parliament of Crimea was the Verkhovna Rada of Crimea or Supreme Council of Crimea. Some MPs called for an extraordinary meeting on 21 February. In response to Russian separatist sentiment, the Security Service of Ukraine (SBU) said that it would "use severe measures to prevent any action taken against diminishing the territorial integrity and sovereignty of Ukraine". (Note: It also noted that "certain politicians, local government officials, leaders of civil society organizations, and radically inclined individuals have attempted to create grounds for escalating the civil conflict, and have spread autonomous and separatist attitudes among the people, which could lead to the demise of our as a united nation and loss of its national sovereignty." In addition, the statement said that certain lawmakers of every level have begun separatist negotiations with representatives of foreign nations. "Open consultations are being held on the possible division of the country into separate parts in violation of the Ukrainian constitution," read the statement. "This could lead to an escalation of conflict between different sectors of society, inciting ethnic or religious hatred and military conflict.") The party with the largest number of seats in the Crimean parliament (80 of 100), the Party of Regions of Ukrainian president Viktor Yanukovych, did not discuss Crimean secession, and were supportive of an agreement between President Yanukovych and Euromaidan activists to end the unrest that was struck on the same day in Kyiv.

Crimean prime minister Anatolii Mohyliov said that his government recognised the new provisional government in Kyiv, and that the Crimean autonomous government would carry out all laws passed by the Ukrainian parliament. In Simferopol, following a pro-Russian demonstration the previous day where protesters had replaced the Ukrainian flag over the parliament with a Russian flag, a pro-Euromaidan rally of between 5,000 and 15,000 was held in support of the new government, and demanding the resignation of the Crimean parliament; attendees waved Ukrainian, Tatar, and European Union flags. Meanwhile, in Sevastopol, thousands protested against the new Ukrainian government, voted to establish a parallel administration, and created civil defence squads with the support of the Russian Night Wolves motorcycle club. Protesters waved Russian flags, chanted "Putin is our president!" and said they would refuse to further pay taxes to the Ukrainian state. Russian military convoys were also alleged to be seen in the area.

In Kerch, pro-Russian protesters attempted to remove the Ukrainian flag from atop city hall and replace it with the flag of Russia. Over 200 attended, waving Russian, orange-and-black St. George, and the Russian Unity party flags. Mayor Oleh Osadchy attempted to disperse the crowd and police eventually arrived to defend the flag. The mayor said "This is the territory of Ukraine, Crimea. Here's a flag of Crimea," but was accused of treason and a fight ensued over the flagpole. On 24 February, more rallied outside the Sevastopol city state administration. Pro-Russian demonstrators accompanied by neo-Cossacks demanded the election of a Russian citizen as mayor and hoisted Russian flags around the city administration; they also handed out leaflets to sign up for a self-defence militia, warning that the "Blue-Brown Europlague is knocking".

Volodymyr Yatsuba, head of Sevastopol administration, announced his resignation, citing the "decision of the city's inhabitants" made at a pro-Russian rally, and while caretaker city administration initially leaned towards recognition of new Ukrainian government, continued pressure from pro-Russian activists forced local authorities to concede. Consequently, Sevastopol City Council illegally elected Alexei Chaly, a Russian citizen, as mayor. Under the law of Ukraine, it was not possible for Sevastopol to elect a mayor, as the Chairman of the Sevastopol City State Administration, appointed by the president of Ukraine, functions as its mayor. A thousand protesters present chanted "A Russian mayor for a Russian city".

On 25 February, several hundred pro-Russian protesters blocked the Crimean parliament demanding non-recognition of the central government of Ukraine and a referendum on Crimea's status. On the same day, crowds gathered again outside Sevastopol's city hall on Tuesday as rumours spread that security forces could arrest Chaly, but police chief Alexander Goncharov said that his officers would refuse to carry out "criminal orders" issued by Kyiv. Viktor Neganov, a Sevastopol-based adviser to the Internal Affairs Minister, condemned the events in the city as a coup. "Chaly represents the interests of the Kremlin which likely gave its tacit approval," he said. Sevastopol City State Administration chairman Vladimir Yatsuba was booed and heckled on 23 February, when he told a pro-Russian rally that Crimea was part of Ukraine. He resigned the next day. In Simferopol, the Regional State Administration building was blockaded with hundreds of protesters, including neo-Cossacks, demanding a referendum of separation; the rally was organized by the Crimean Front.

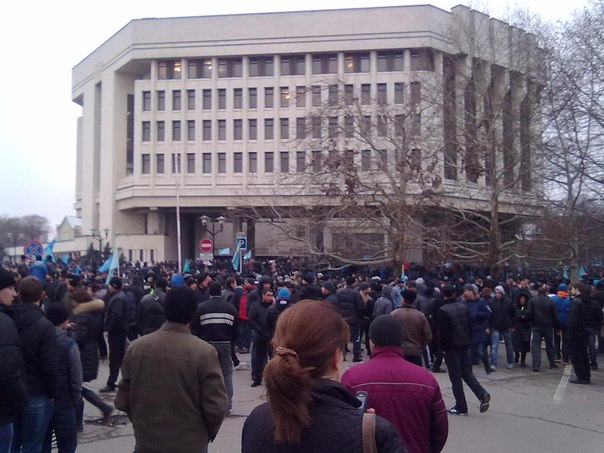
Protests outside the Crimean parliament building in Simferopol, 26 February 2014

On 26 February, outside the Crimean parliament building in Simferopol, 4,000–5,000 Crimean Tatars and supporters of the Euromaidan-Crimea movement faced 600–700 supporters of pro-Russian organizations and the Russian Unity Party. Tatars leaders organised the demonstration to block the sitting of the Crimean parliament which is "doing everything to execute plans of separation of Crimea from Ukraine". Supreme Council Chairman Vladimir Konstantinov said that the Crimean parliament would not consider separation from Ukraine, and that earlier reports that parliament would hold a debate on the matter were provocations. Tatars created self-defence groups, encouraged collaboration with Russians, Ukrainians, and people of other nationalities, and called for the protection of churches, mosques, synagogues, and other important sites. By nightfall the Crimean Tatars had left; several hundred Russian Unity supporters rallied on.

The new Ukrainian government's acting Internal Affairs Minister Arsen Avakov tasked Crimean law enforcement agencies not to provoke conflicts and to do whatever necessary to prevent clashes with pro-Russian forces; and he added "I think, that way – through a dialogue – we shall achieve much more than with standoffs". New Security Service of Ukraine (SBU) chief Valentyn Nalyvaichenko requested that the United Nations provide around-the-clock monitoring of the security situation in Crimea.

=== Russian military takeover of Crimea ===
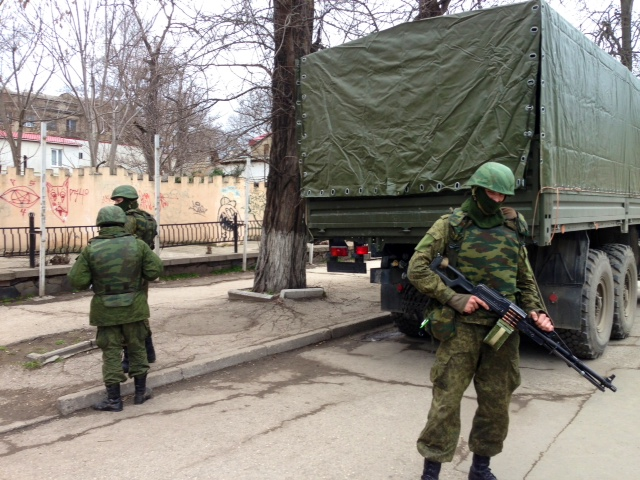
Russian soldiers without markings in Simferopol, Crimea, 2 March 2014

Russia took advantage of the uncertainty in Ukraine immediately after the ousting of Yanukovych. On 26 February, Russian soldiers without insignia began to occupy Crimea and to blockade Ukrainian military bases. In Simferopol, the Russian soldiers seized the Crimean parliament building and the Council of Ministers building. Russian flags were raised over these buildings and barricades were erected outside them. A military checkpoint, with a Russian flag and Russian military vehicles, was set up on the main highway between Sevastopol and Simferopol.

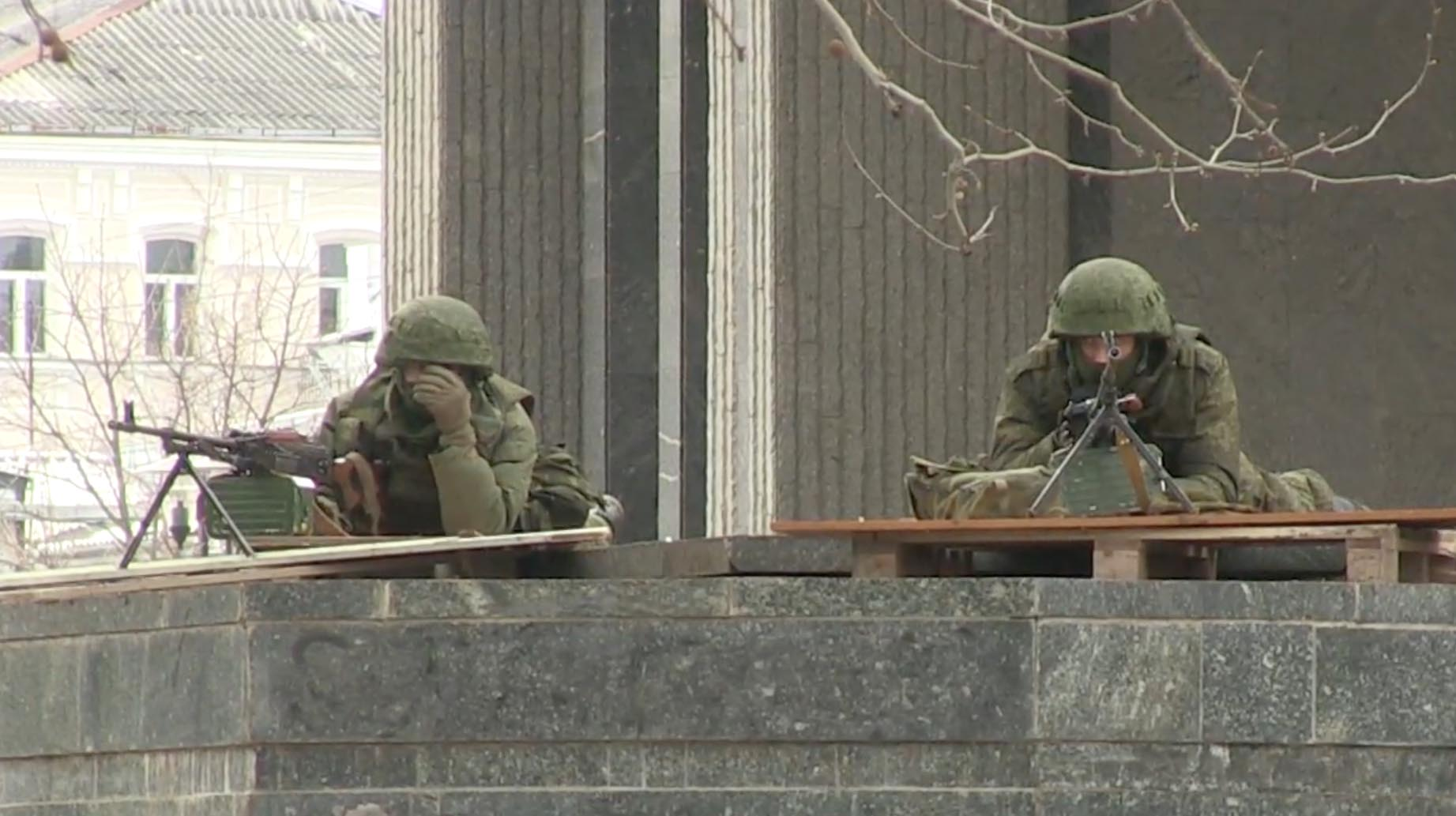
Russian soldiers without markings occupying the Crimean parliament building, 1 March 2014

While the armed soldiers occupied the Crimean parliament building, the parliament held an emergency session. It voted to dismiss the Crimean government, and replace Prime Minister Anatolii Mohyliov with Sergey Aksyonov. Aksyonov belonged to the Russian Unity party, which received only 4% of votes in the last election. According to the Constitution of Ukraine, the prime minister of Crimea is appointed by the Crimean parliament (Supreme Council of Crimea) in consultation with the president of Ukraine. Both Aksyonov and speaker Vladimir Konstantinov stated that they viewed Viktor Yanukovych as the de jure president of Ukraine, through whom they were able to ask Russia for help. The parliament also voted to hold a referendum on greater autonomy, set for 25 May. Historian Andrew Wilson and journalist Luke Harding called this the "Crimean coup".

The troops had cut all of the building's communications, and took MPs' phones as they entered. No independent journalists were allowed inside the building while the votes were held. Some MPs said they were threatened and that votes were cast for them and other MPs, even though they were not in the chamber. Interfax-Ukraine reported that there was no way to know how many MPs were present, and whether they voted themselves or if someone else used their voting cards. The head of parliament's information and analysis department, Olha Sulnikova, phoned journalists from inside the building, telling them 61 of the registered 64 deputies had voted for the referendum resolution and 55 for the resolution to dismiss the government. These votes were immediately declared illegal by the Ukrainian interim government.

Russian FSB colonel Igor Girkin (alias 'Strelkov'), one of the commanders of the soldiers, said in January 2015 that Crimean MPs were held at gunpoint, and were forced to support the annexation. Girkin said:

"Unfortunately I did not see any support from the [Crimean] authorities in Simferopol where I was ... It was militants who collected deputies and forced them to vote. Yes, I was one of the commanders of those militants".

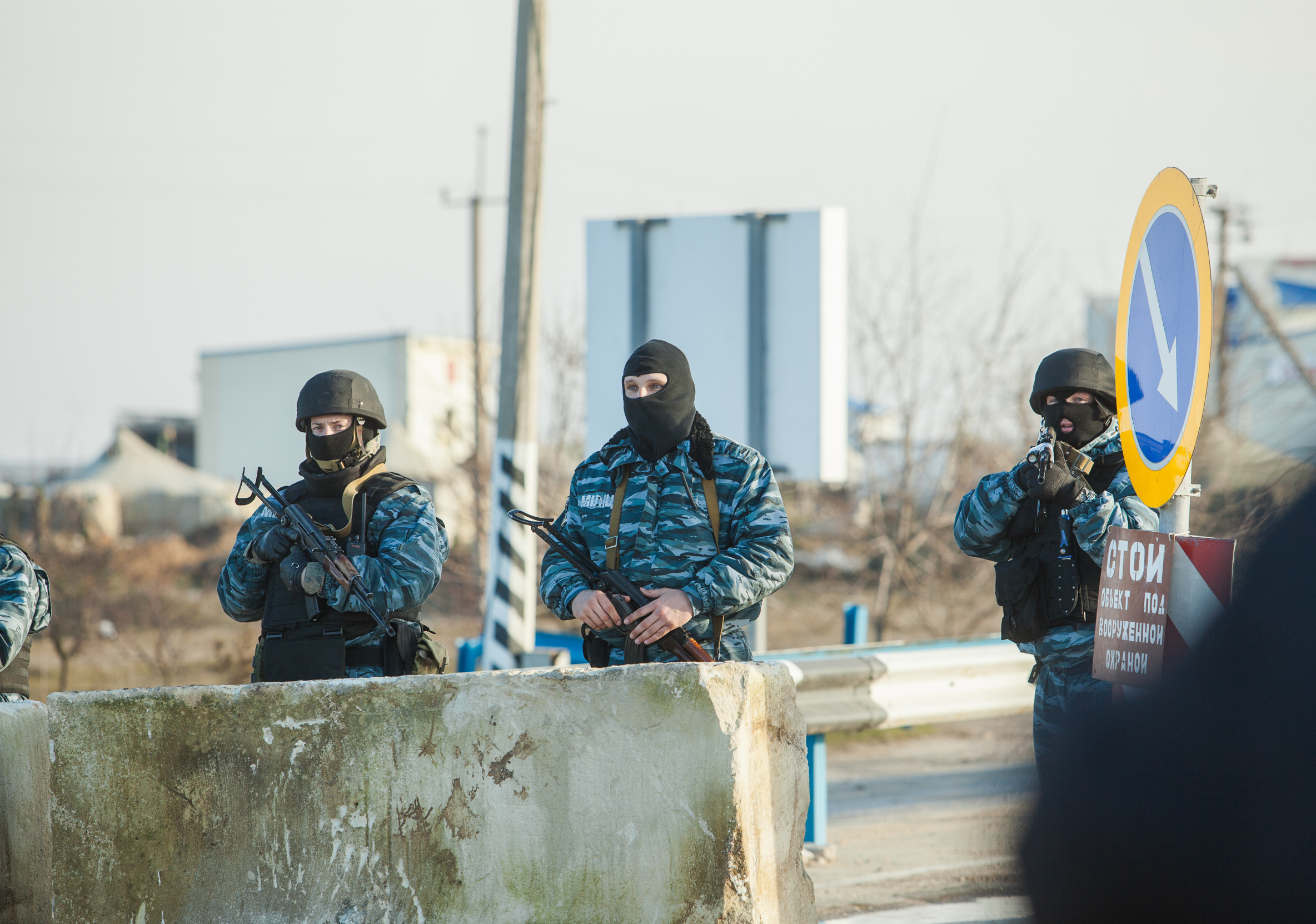
Armed men in Berkut uniform guarding a checkpoint at Chonhar, on the border of mainland Ukraine and Crimea, 10 March 2014

The same day, more unmarked troops set up security checkpoints on the Isthmus of Perekop and the Chonhar Peninsula, which separate Crimea from the Ukrainian mainland. They were helped by what appeared to be local Berkut riot police, as well as Russian troops from the 31st Separate Airborne Assault Brigade dressed in Berkut uniforms. Within hours, Ukraine had been cut off from Crimea. Ukrainian TV channels became unavailable for Crimean viewers, some replaced with Russian stations. On 29 February, unmarked Russian special forces occupied Crimea's airports and communications centers.

On the day of the invasion, the Russian government dismissed accusations that it was in violation of the agreement on the Black Sea Fleet: "All movements of armored vehicles are undertaken in full compliance with the basic agreements and did not require any approvals". On 28 February, an estimated 1,400 Spetsnaz troops were flown in to the Gvardeyskoye air base from Russia. On the same day, Putin assured German Chancellor Angela Merkel in a phone call that no regular Russian soldiers are active in Crimea.

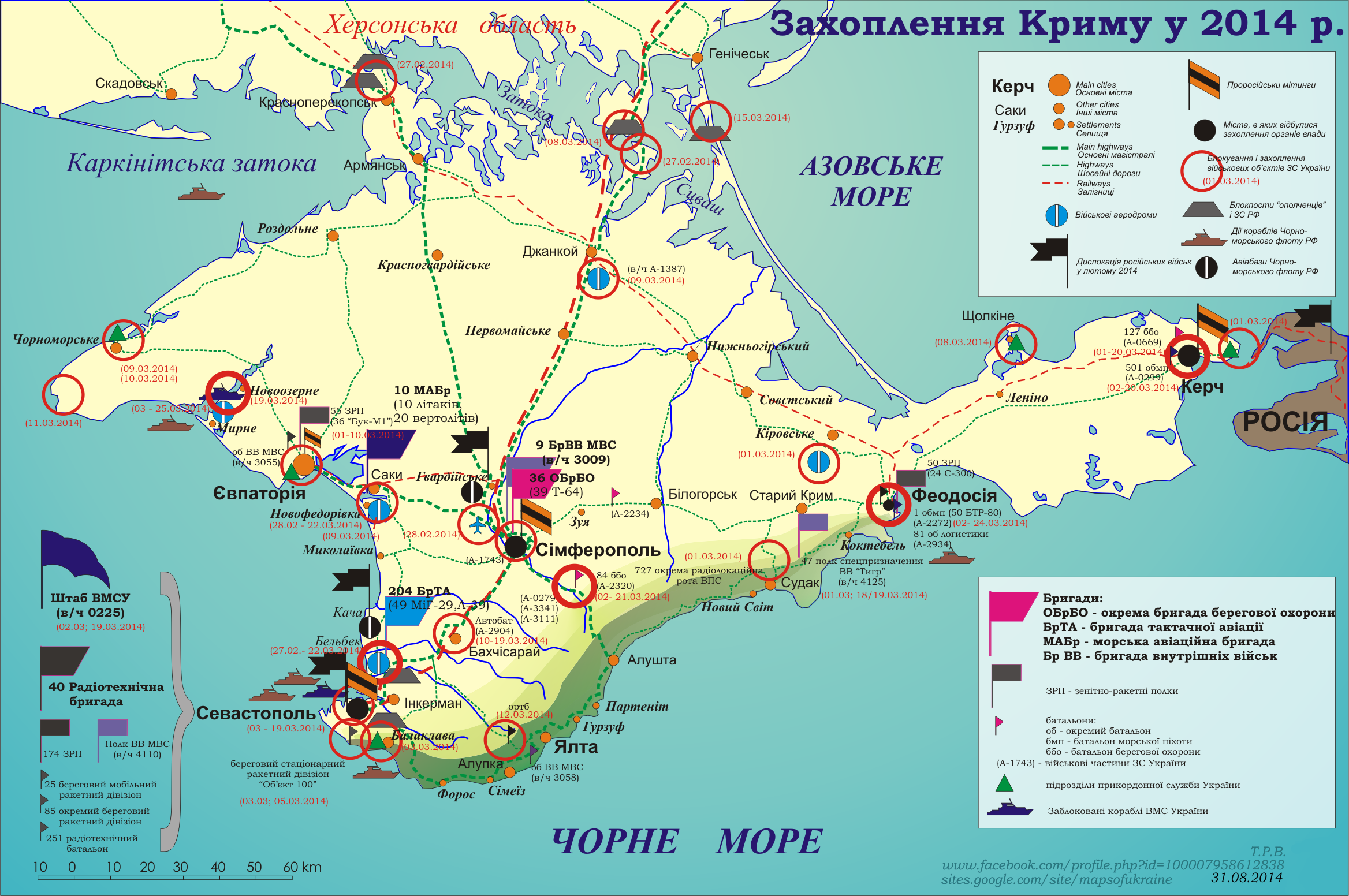
The blockade of military units of the Armed Forces of Ukraine during the capture of Crimea by Russia in February–March 2014

On 1 March 2014, Aksyonov asked Putin for "assistance in ensuring peace and tranquillity" in Crimea. Putin promptly received authorisation from the Federation Council of Russia for a Russian military intervention in Ukraine until the "political-social situation in the country is normalized". Ukraine's prime minister, Arseniy Yatsenyuk, said that Russian military intervention would be the beginning of war, and Ukraine's representative told an emergency meeting of the UN Security Council that Russia was committing "an act of aggression against the state of Ukraine". By 2 March, Russian troops were in full control of Crimea, having deployed from the naval base in Sevastopol and reinforced by troops, armour, and helicopters from mainland Russia.

At a press conference on 4 March, president Putin said that Russia had no plans to annex Crimea. He also said that it had no plans to invade Ukraine, but that it might intervene if Russians in Ukraine were threatened.

Numerous media reports and statements by the Ukrainian and foreign governments noted the identity of the unmarked troops as Russian soldiers, but Russian officials concealed the identity of their forces, claiming they were local "self-defence" units over whom they had no authority. As late as 17 April, Russian foreign minister Sergey Lavrov said that there were no "excessive Russian troops" in Ukraine, referring to those who were allowed to be at the Sevastopol naval base. Putin later acknowledged that he had ordered "work to bring Crimea back into Russia" as early as February.

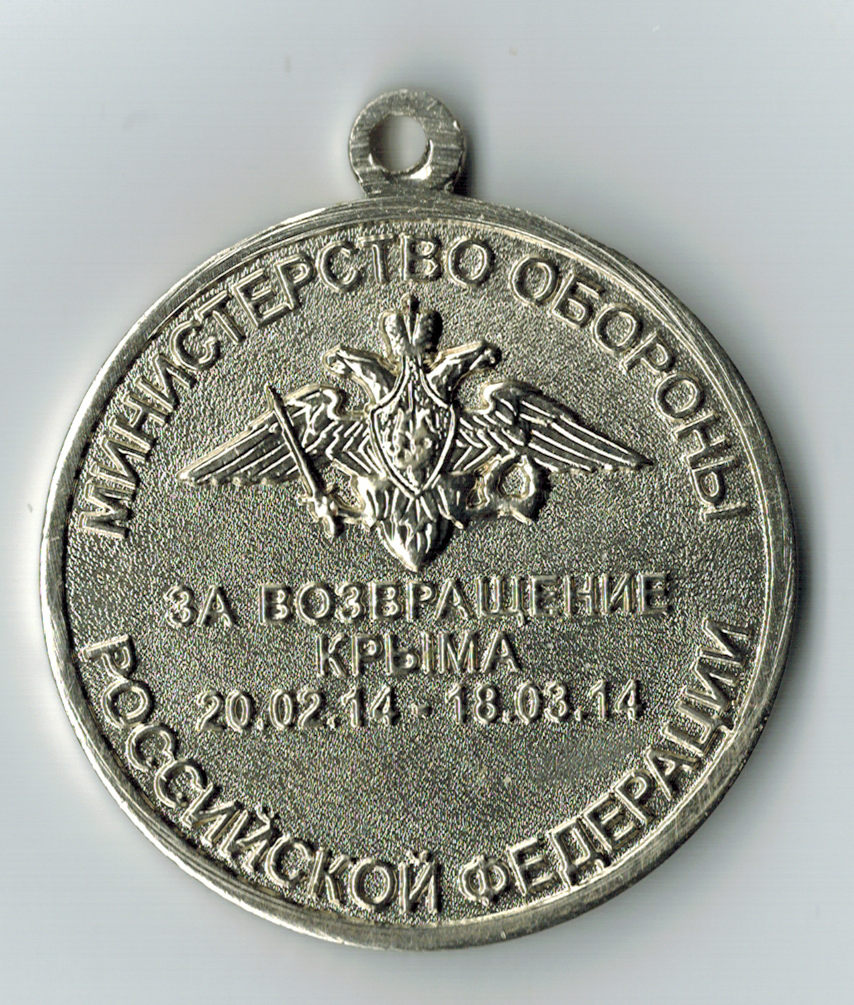
Medal of the Russian Defense Ministry "For the return of Crimea" (Russian: За возвращение Крыма), 20 February – 18 March 2014

Russia eventually admitted its troops' presence. Defence Minister Sergey Shoygu said Russian military actions in Crimea were undertaken by forces of the Black Sea Fleet and were justified by a "threat to lives of Crimean civilians" and danger of "takeover of Russian military infrastructure by extremists". Ukraine complained that Russia violated the agreement under which it headquartered its Black Sea Fleet in Sevastopol and violated the country's sovereignty. The United States and United Kingdom accused Russia of breaking the terms of the Budapest Memorandum on Security Assurances, by which Russia, the US, and the UK had affirmed they would not use force against the territorial integrity or political independence of Ukraine. The Russian government said the Budapest Memorandum did not apply due to "circumstances resulting from the action of internal political or socio-economic factors". In March 2015, retired Russian Admiral Igor Kasatonov said that, according to his information, the Russian troop deployment in Crimea included six helicopter landings and three landings of an IL-76 with 500 troops.

=== Legal issues ===
The obligations between Russia and Ukraine with regard to territorial integrity and the prohibition of the use of force are laid down in a number of multilateral or bilateral agreements to which Russia and Ukraine are signatories.

Vladimir Putin said that Russian troops in the Crimean Peninsula were aimed "to ensure proper conditions for the people of Crimea to be able to freely express their will," whilst Ukraine and other nations argue that such intervention is a violation of Ukraine's sovereignty.

In the 1994 Budapest Memorandum on Security Assurances Russia was among those who affirmed to respect the territorial integrity of Ukraine (including Crimea) and to refrain from the threat or use of force against the territorial integrity or political independence of Ukraine. The 1997 Russian–Ukrainian Treaty on Friendship, Cooperation, and Partnership again reaffirmed the inviolability of the borders between both states, and required Russian forces in Crimea to respect the sovereignty of Ukraine, honor its legislation and not interfere in the internal affairs of the country.

The Russian–Ukrainian Partition Treaty on the Status and Conditions of the Black Sea Fleet signed in 1997 and prolonged in 2010, determined the status of Russian military presence in Crimea and restricted their operations, including requirement to show their "military identification cards" when crossing the international border and that operations beyond designated deployment sites was permitted only after coordination with Ukraine. According to Ukraine usage of navigation stations and troop movements were improperly covered by the treaty and were violated many times as well as related court decisions. February's troop movements were in "complete disregard" of the treaty. (Note: Dilanian (2014) on 3 March, "CIA director John Brennan told a senior lawmaker Monday that a 1997 treaty between Russia and Ukraine allows up to 25,000 Russia troops in the vital Crimea region, so Russia may not consider its recent troop movements to be an invasion, U.S. officials said.")

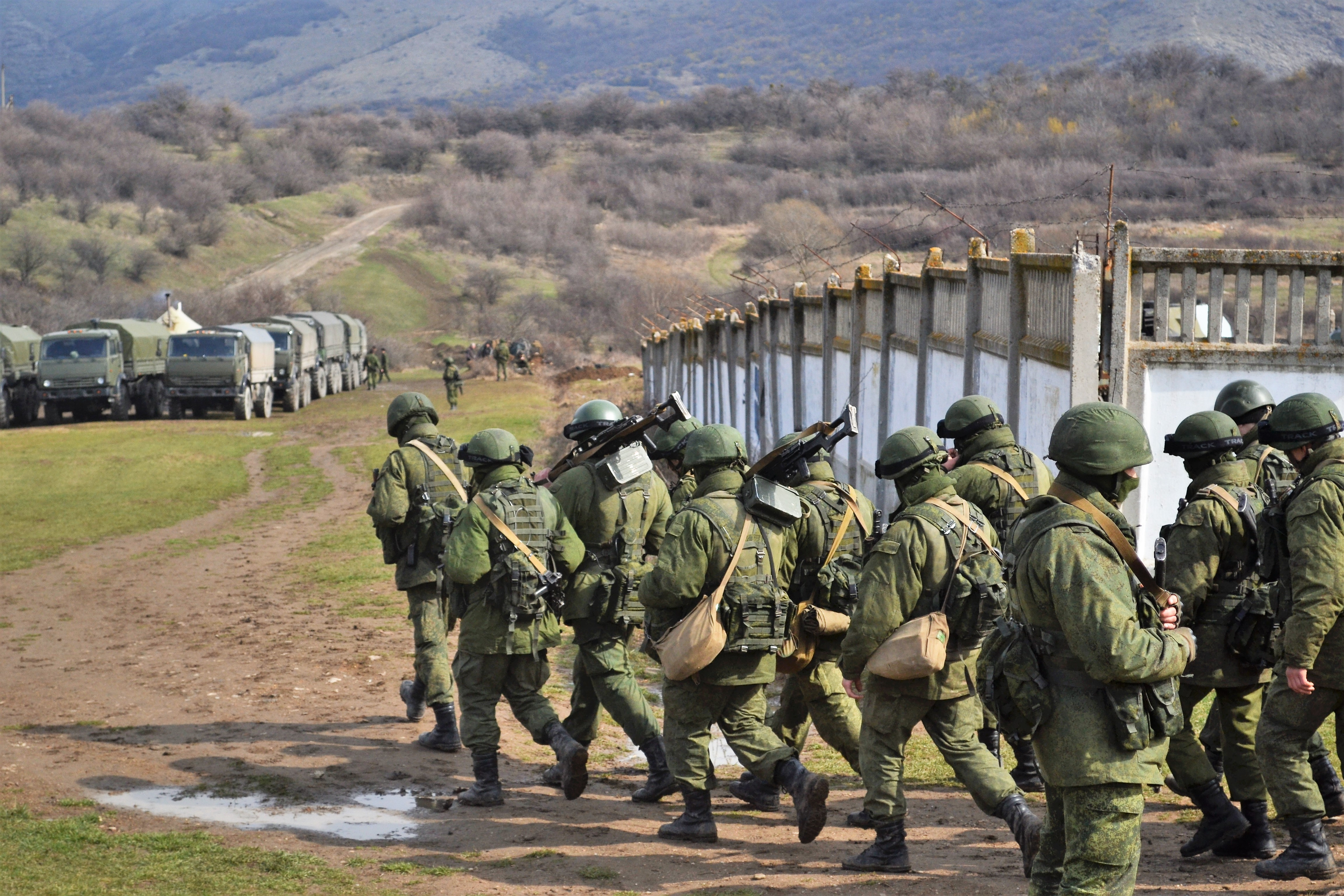
"Little green men" and trucks after the seizure of Perevalne military base, 9 March 2014

According to the Constitution of Russia, the admission of new federal subjects is governed by federal constitutional law (art. 65.2). Such a law was adopted in 2001, and it postulates that admission of a foreign state or its part into Russia shall be based on a mutual accord between the Russian Federation and the relevant state and shall take place pursuant to an international treaty between the two countries; moreover, it must be initiated by the state in question, not by its subdivision or by Russia.

On 28 February 2014, Russian MP Sergey Mironov, along with other members of the Duma, introduced a bill to alter Russia's procedure for adding federal subjects. According to the bill, accession could be initiated by a subdivision of a country, provided that there is "absence of efficient sovereign state government in foreign state"; the request could be made either by subdivision bodies on their own or on the basis of a referendum held in the subdivision in accordance with corresponding national legislation.

On 11 March 2014, both the Supreme Council of Crimea and the Sevastopol City Council adopted a declaration of independence, which stated their intent to declare independence and request full accession to Russia should the pro-Russian option receive the most votes during the scheduled status referendum. The declaration directly referred to the Kosovo independence precedent, by which the Albanian-populated Autonomous Province of Kosovo and Metohija declared independence from Russia's ally Serbia as the Republic of Kosovo in 2008—a unilateral action Russia staunchly opposed. The Russian government used Kosovo independence precedent as a legal justification for the annexation of Crimea Many analysts saw the Crimean declaration as an overt effort to pave the way for Crimea's annexation by Russia and reject Russia's Kosovo precedent justification as being different compared to Crimea events, comparing the annexation to the Nazi Germany's anschluss of Austria and Czechoslovak Sudetes instead.

Crimean authorities' stated plans to declare independence from Ukraine made the Mironov bill unnecessary. On 20 March 2014, two days after the treaty of accession was signed, the bill was withdrawn by its initiators.

At its meeting on 21–22 March, the Council of Europe's Venice Commission stated that the Mironov bill violated "in particular, the principles of territorial integrity, national sovereignty, non-intervention in the internal affairs of another state and pacta sunt servanda" and was therefore incompatible with international law.

=== Crimean status referendum ===
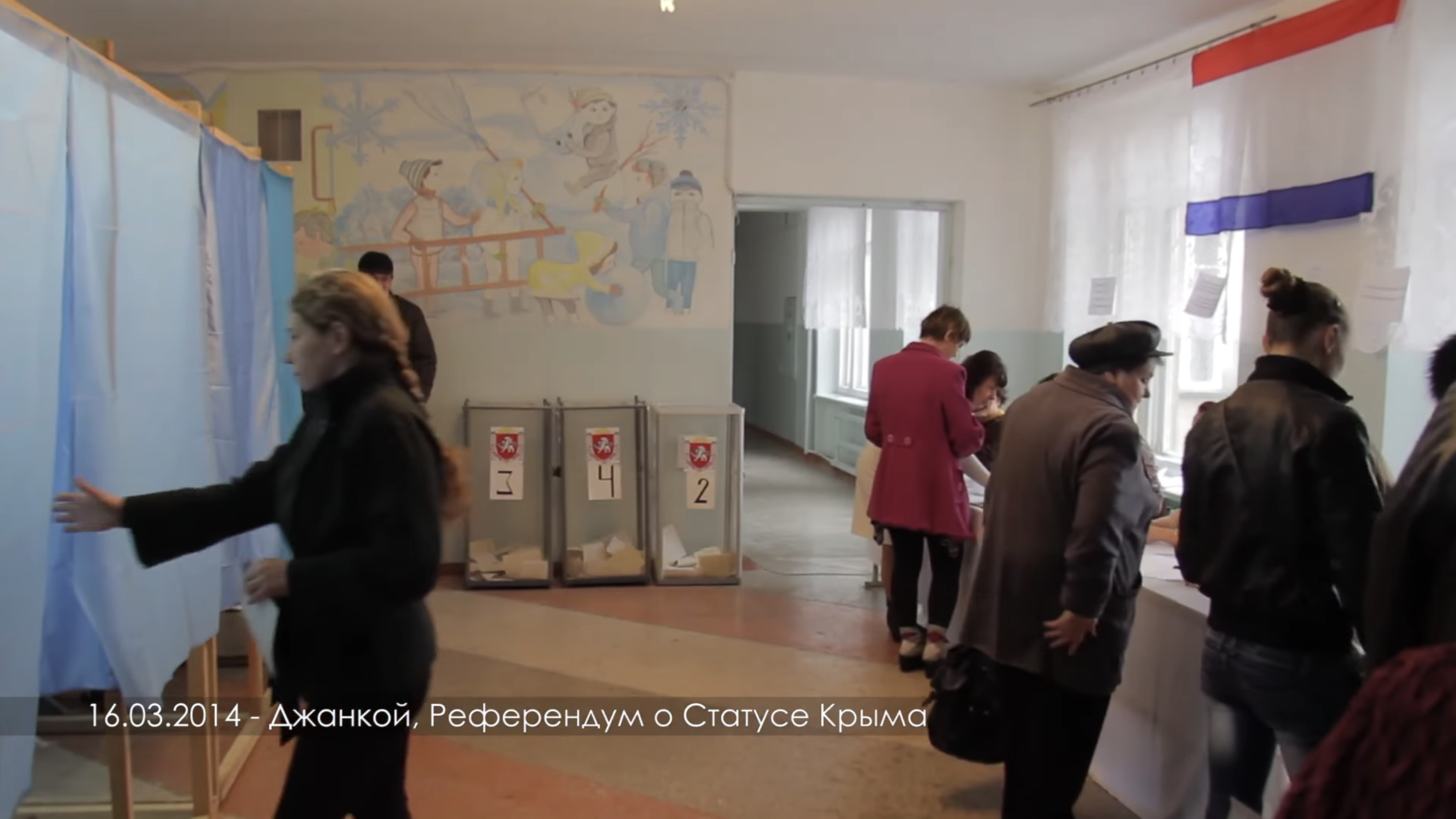
A polling station during the "referendum"

On 27 February 2014, following the takeover of its building and replacement of Ukrainian-elected officials with Russian-controlled actors by Russian special forces, the Supreme Council of Crimea voted to hold a referendum on 25 May, with the initial question as to whether Crimea should upgrade its autonomy within Ukraine. The referendum date was later moved from 25 May to 30 March. A Ukrainian court declared the referendum to be illegal.

On 6 March, the Supreme Council moved the referendum date to 16 March and changed its scope to ask a new question: whether Crimea should apply to join Russia as a federal subject or restore the 1992 Crimean constitution within Ukraine, which the Ukrainian government had previously invalidated. This referendum, unlike one announced earlier, contained no option to maintain the status quo of governance under the 1998 constitution. Ukraine's acting president, Oleksandr Turchynov, stated that "The authorities in Crimea are totally illegitimate, both the parliament and the government. They are forced to work under the barrel of a gun and all their decisions are dictated by fear and are illegal".

On 14 March, the Crimean status referendum was deemed unconstitutional by the Constitutional Court of Ukraine, and a day later, the Verkhovna Rada formally dissolved the Crimean parliament. With a referendum looming, Russia massed troops near the Ukrainian eastern border, likely to threaten escalation and stymie Ukraine's response.

The referendum was held despite the opposition from the Ukrainian government. Official results reported about 95.5% of participating voters in Crimea (turnout was 83%) were in favour of seceding from Ukraine and joining Russia. Crimean Tatars mostly boycotted the referendum. A report by Evgeny Bobrov, a member of the Russian President's Human Rights Council, suggested the official results were inflated and between 50 and 60% of Crimeans voted for the reunification with Russia, with the turnout of 30–50%, meaning that 15% to 30% of Crimeans eligible to vote voted for the Russian annexation (the support was higher in administratively separate Sevastopol). According to a survey carried out by Pew Research Center in 2014, 54% of Crimean residents supported the right of regions to secede, 91% believed the referendum was free and fair and 88% believed that the government in Kyiv ought to recognize the results of the vote.

The means by which the referendum was conducted were widely criticised by foreign governments and in the Ukrainian and international press, with reports that anyone holding a Russian passport regardless of residency in Crimea was allowed to vote. OSCE refused to send observers to the referendum, stating that invitation should have come from an OSCE member state in question (i.e. Ukraine), rather than local authorities. Russia invited a group of observers from various European far-right political parties aligned with Putin, who stated the referendum was conducted in a free and fair manner.

=== Crimean proclamation of independence ===
The Republic of Crimea was short lived. On 17 March, following the official announcement of the referendum results, the Supreme Council of Crimea declared the formal independence of the Republic of Crimea, comprising the territories of both the Autonomous Republic of Crimea and the city of Sevastopol, which was granted special status within the breakaway republic. The Crimean parliament declared the "partial repeal" of Ukrainian laws and began nationalising private and Ukrainian state property located on the Crimean Peninsula, including Ukrainian ports and property of Chornomornaftogaz. Parliament also formally requested that the Russian government admit the breakaway republic into Russia, with Sevastopol asking to be admitted as a "city of federal significance". On the same day, the de facto Supreme Council renamed itself the State Council of Crimea, declared the Russian ruble an official currency alongside the hryvnia, and in June the Russian ruble became the only form of legal tender.

Putin officially recognised the Republic of Crimea 'as a sovereign and independent state' by decree on 17 March.

On 21 March the Republic of Crimea became a federal Subject of Russia.

=== Accession treaty ===
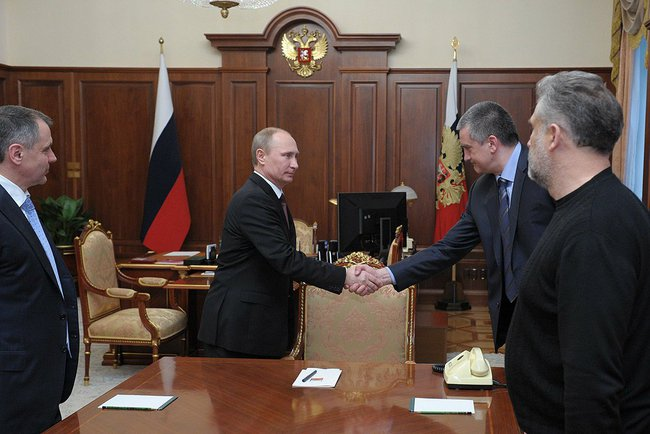
President Putin with Vladimir Konstantinov, Sergey Aksyonov and Alexey Chaly at the Kremlin, 18 March 2014

The Treaty on Accession of the Republic of Crimea to Russia was signed between representatives of the Republic of Crimea (including Sevastopol, with which the rest of Crimea briefly unified) and the Russian Federation on 18 March 2014 to lay out terms for the immediate admission of the Republic of Crimea and Sevastopol as federal subjects of Russia and part of the Russian Federation. (Note: The treaty between Russia and pro-Russian Aksyonov government of Crimea, signed on that date, specified that Crimea would be considered incorporated into Russia since the date of signing. The document entered into force on 1 April 2014, but pending that was applied provisionally since very signing.) On 19 March, the Russian Constitutional Court decided that the treaty is in compliance with the Constitution of Russia. The treaty was ratified by the Federal Assembly and Federation Council by 21 March. A Just Russia's Ilya Ponomarev was the only State Duma member to vote against the treaty. The Republic of Crimea and the federal city of Sevastopol became the 84th and 85th federal subjects of Russia.

Russian president Putin gave a speech on 18 March 2014 to mark the annexation of Crimea. Putin defended the referendum as being "in full compliance with democratic procedures" and the principle of self-determination. He said "In people's hearts and minds, Crimea has always been an inseparable part of Russia" and argued that it should never have become part of an independent Ukraine. Putin lamented the dissolution of the Soviet Union for having "robbed" Russia of territories and making Russians "the biggest ethnic group in the world to be divided by borders", calling this an "outrageous historical injustice". According to Putin, the Ukrainian revolution was a "coup" by "Nationalists, neo-Nazis, Russophobes and anti-Semites". Referring to the armed men occupying Crimea as "local self-defense units", he claimed that "Russia's armed forces never entered Crimea", and he denied that Russia wanted to take any other regions of Ukraine.

=== Armed clash and withdrawal of Ukrainian troops ===
During a controversial incident in Simferopol on 18 March, some Ukrainian sources said that armed gunmen that were reported to be Russian special forces allegedly stormed the base. This was contested by Russian authorities, who subsequently announced the arrest of an alleged Ukrainian sniper in connection with the killings, but later denied the arrest had occurred.

The two casualties had a joint funeral attended by both the Crimean and Ukrainian authorities, and both the Ukrainian soldier and Russian paramilitary "self-defence volunteer" were mourned together. As of March 2014 the incident was under investigation by both the Crimean authorities and the Ukrainian military.

In response to shooting, Ukraine's then acting defense minister Ihor Tenyukh authorised Ukrainian troops stationed in Crimea to use deadly force in life-threatening situations. This increased the risk of bloodshed during any takeover of Ukrainian military installations, yet the ensuing Russian operations to seize the remaining Ukrainian military bases and ships in Crimea did not bring new fatalities, although weapons were used and several people were injured. The Russian units involved in such operations were ordered to avoid usage of deadly force when possible. Morale among the Ukrainian troops, which for three weeks were blockaded inside their compounds without any assistance from the Ukrainian government, was very low, and the vast majority of them did not offer any real resistance.

On 24 March, the Ukrainian government ordered the full withdrawal of all of its armed forces from Crimea. Approximately 50% of the Ukrainian soldiers in Crimea had defected to the Russian military. On 26 March the last Ukrainian military bases and Ukrainian Navy ships were captured by Russian troops.

=== Continued occupation and integration with Russia ===
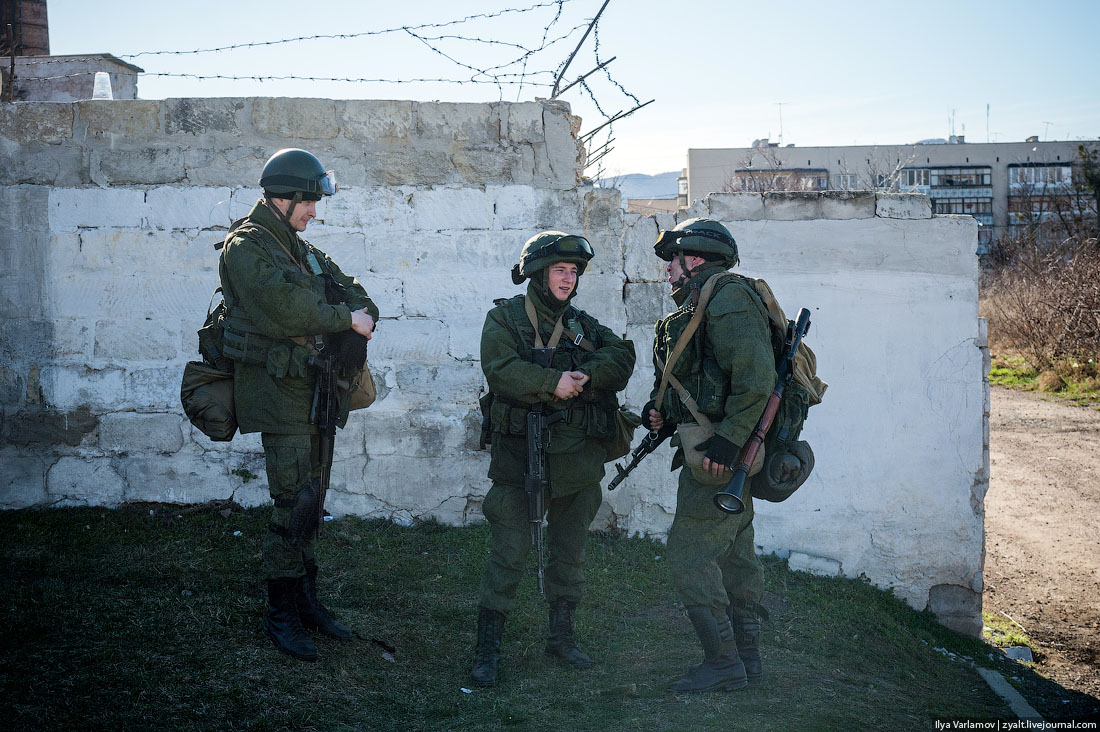
Russian troops in Crimea, March 2014

On 27 March, the United Nations General Assembly adopted a non-binding resolution, which declared the Crimean referendum and subsequent status change invalid, by a vote of 100 to 11, with 58 abstentions and 24 absent.

Crimea and Sevastopol switched to Moscow Time at 10 p.m. on 29 March.

On 31 March, Russia unilaterally denounced the Kharkiv Pact and Partition Treaty on the Status and Conditions of the Black Sea Fleet. Putin cited "the accession of the Republic of Crimea and Sevastopol into Russia" and resulting "practical end of renting relationships" as his reason for the denunciation. On the same day, he signed a decree formally rehabilitating the Crimean Tatars, who were ousted from their lands in 1944, and the Armenian, German, Greek, and Bulgarian minority communities in the region that Stalin also ordered removed in the 1940s.

Also on 31 March 2014, the Russian prime minister Dmitry Medvedev announced a series of programmes aimed at swiftly incorporating the territory of Crimea into Russia's economy and infrastructure. Medvedev announced the creation of a new ministry for Crimean affairs, and ordered Russia's top ministers who joined him there to make coming up with a development plan their top priority. On 3 April 2014, the Republic of Crimea and the city of Sevastopol became parts of Russia's Southern Military District. On 7 May 2015, Crimea switched its phone code system from the Ukrainian number system to the Russian number system.

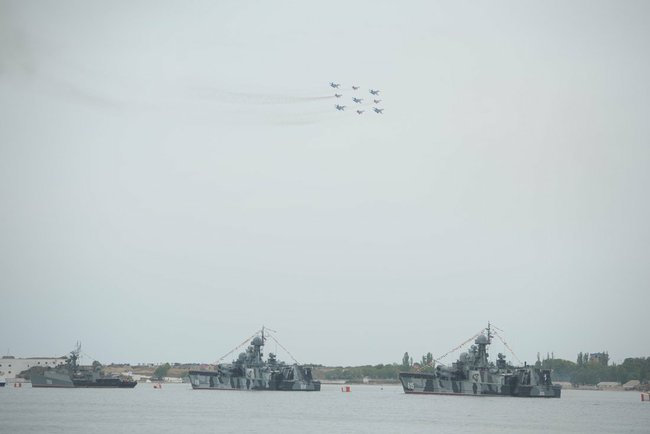
Russian forces during Victory Day in Sevastopol, 2014

On 11 April, the Constitution of the Republic of Crimea and City Charter of Sevastopol were adopted by their respective legislatures, coming into effect the following day in addition the new federal subjects were enumerated in a newly published revision of the Russian Constitution.

On 14 April, Vladimir Putin announced that he would open a ruble-only account with Bank Rossiya and would make it the primary bank in the newly annexed Crimea as well as giving the right to service payments on Russia's $36 billion wholesale electricity market – which gave the bank $112 million annually from commission charges alone.

Russia withdrew its forces from southern Kherson in December 2014.

In December 2014, and electricity supply agreement was made between Ukraine's Ukrinterenergo and Russia's Inter RAO that electricity would be supplied from Ukraine in return for an equivalent supply of Russian electricity to Ukraine, which resolved electricity rationing in Crimea.

In July 2015, Russian prime minister, Dmitry Medvedev, declared that Crimea had been fully integrated into Russia. Until 2016 these new subjects were grouped in the Crimean Federal District.

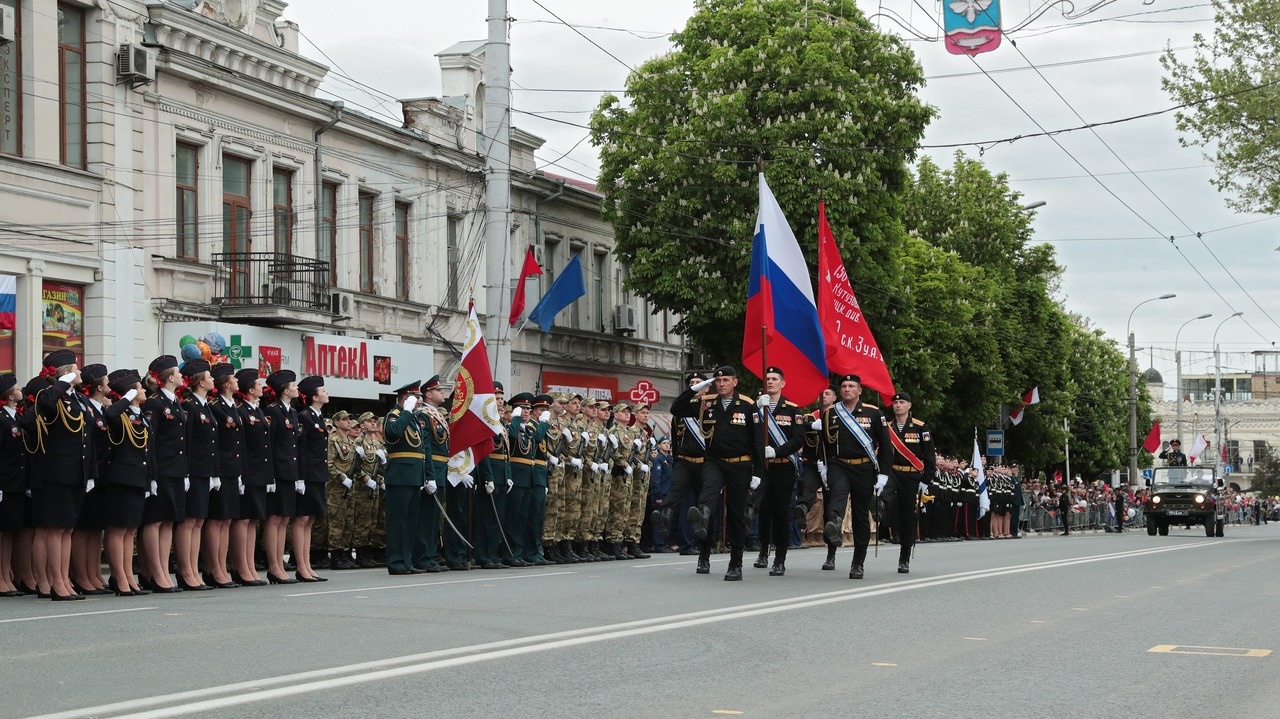
Victory Day in Simferopol, occupied Crimea, 2019

In 2017, a survey performed by the Centre for East European and International Studies showed that 85% of the non-Crimean Tatar respondents believed that if the referendum would be held again it would lead to the same or "only marginally different" results. Crimea was fully integrated into the Russian media sphere, and links with the rest of Ukraine were hardly existent.

On 28 December 2018, Russia completed a high-tech security fence marking the de facto border between Crimea and Ukraine.

In 2021, Ukraine launched the Crimea Platform, a diplomatic initiative aimed at protecting the rights of Crimean inhabitants and ultimately reversing the annexation of Crimea.

== Transition and aftermath ==
=== Economic implications ===
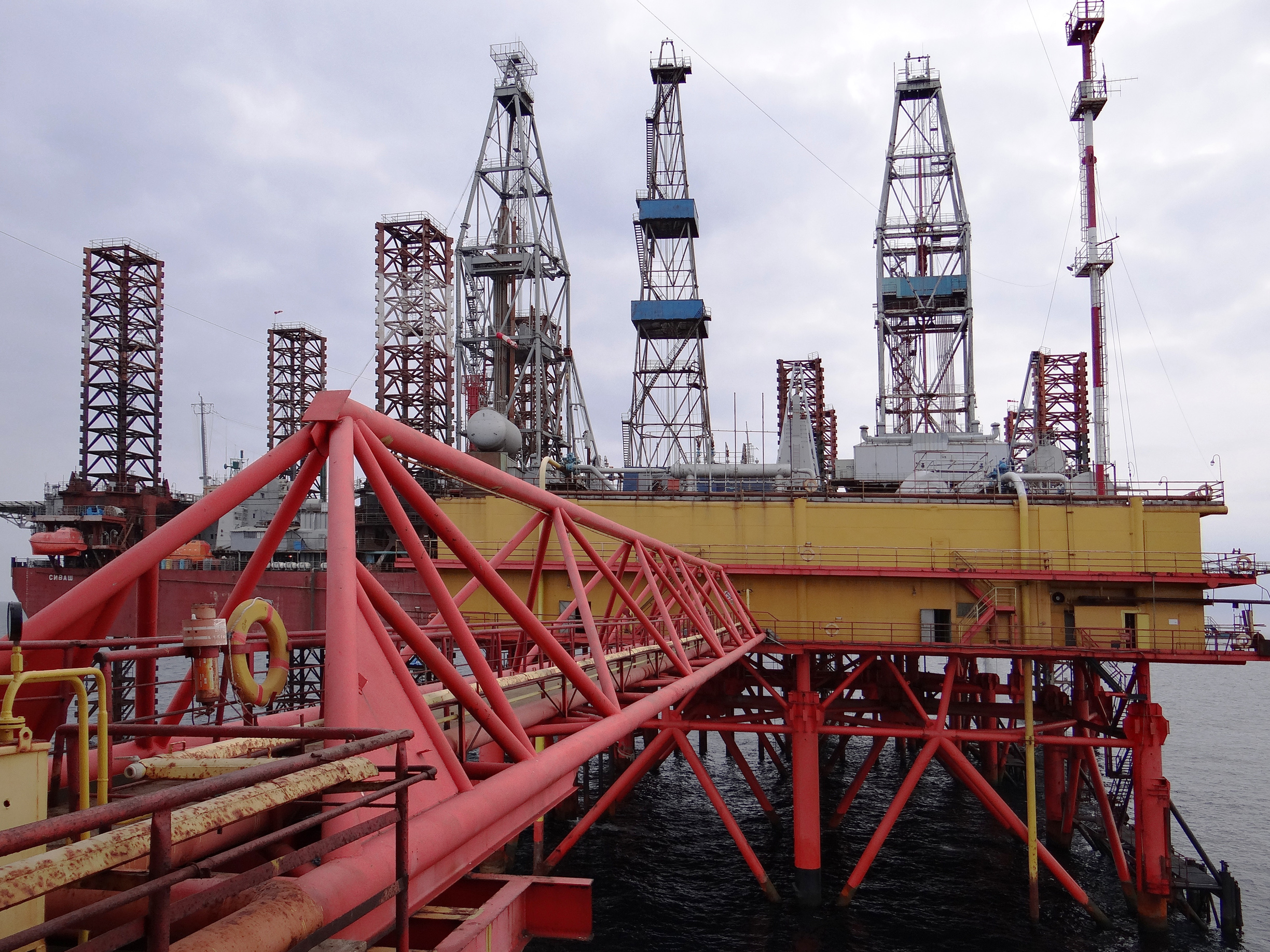
A Ukrainian Chornomornaftogaz platform in the Black Sea, which Russia seized during the Crimea annexation

Initially after the annexation, salaries rose, especially those of government workers. This was soon offset by the increase in prices caused by the depreciation of the ruble. Wages were cut back by 30% to 70% after Russian authority became established. Tourism, previously Crimea's main industry, suffered in particular, down by 50% from 2014 in 2015. Crimean agricultural yields were also significantly impacted by the annexation. Ukraine cut off supplies of water through the North Crimean Canal, which supplies 85% of Crimea's fresh water, causing the 2014 rice crop to fail, and greatly damaging the maize and soybean crops. The annexation had a negative influence on Russians working in Ukraine and Ukrainians working in Russia.

The number of tourists visiting Crimea in the 2014 season was lower than in the previous years due to a combination of "Western sanctions", ethical objections by Ukrainians, and the difficulty of getting there for Russians. The Russian government attempted to stimulate the flow of tourists by subsidizing holidays in the peninsula for children and state workers from all Russia which worked mostly for state-owned hotels. In 2015, overall 3 million tourists visited Crimea according to official data, while before annexation it was around 5.5 million on average. The shortage is attributed mostly to stopped flow of tourists from Ukraine. Hotels and restaurants are also experiencing problems with finding enough seasonal workers, who were most arriving from Ukraine in the preceding years. Tourists visiting state-owned hotels were complaining mostly about low standard of rooms and facilities, some of them still unrepaired from Soviet times.

According to the German newspaper Die Welt, the annexation of Crimea is economically disadvantageous for the Russian Federation. Russia will have to spend billions of euros a year to pay salaries and pensions. Moreover, Russia will have to undertake costly projects to connect Crimea to the Russian water supply and power system because Crimea has no land connection to Russia and at present (2014) gets water, gas and electricity from mainland Ukraine. This required building a bridge and a pipeline across the Kerch Strait. Also, Novinite claims that a Ukrainian expert told Die Welt that Crimea "will not be able to attract tourists".

The then first Deputy to Minister of Finance of Russian Federation Tatyana Nesterenko said that the decision to annex Crimea was made by Vladimir Putin exclusively, without consulting Russia's Finance Ministry.

The Russian business newspaper Kommersant expresses an opinion that Russia will not acquire anything economically from "accessing" Crimea, which is not very developed industrially, having just a few big factories, and whose yearly gross product is only $4 billion. The newspaper also says that everything from Russia will have to be delivered by sea, higher costs of transportation will result in higher prices for everything, and to avoid a decline in living standards Russia will have to subsidise Crimean people for a few months. In total, Kommersant estimates the costs of integrating Crimea into Russia in $30 billion over the next decade, i.e. $3 billion per year.

Western oil expertsestimate that Russia's seizing of Crimea, and the associated control of an area of Black Sea more than three times its land area gives it access to oil and gas reserves potentially worth trillions of dollars. It also deprives Ukraine of its chances of energy independence. Moscow's acquisition may alter the route along which the South Stream pipeline would be built, saving Russia money, time and engineering challenges. It would also allow Russia to avoid building in Turkish territorial waters, which was necessary in the original route to avoid Ukrainian territory. This pipeline was later canceled in favour of TurkStream, however.

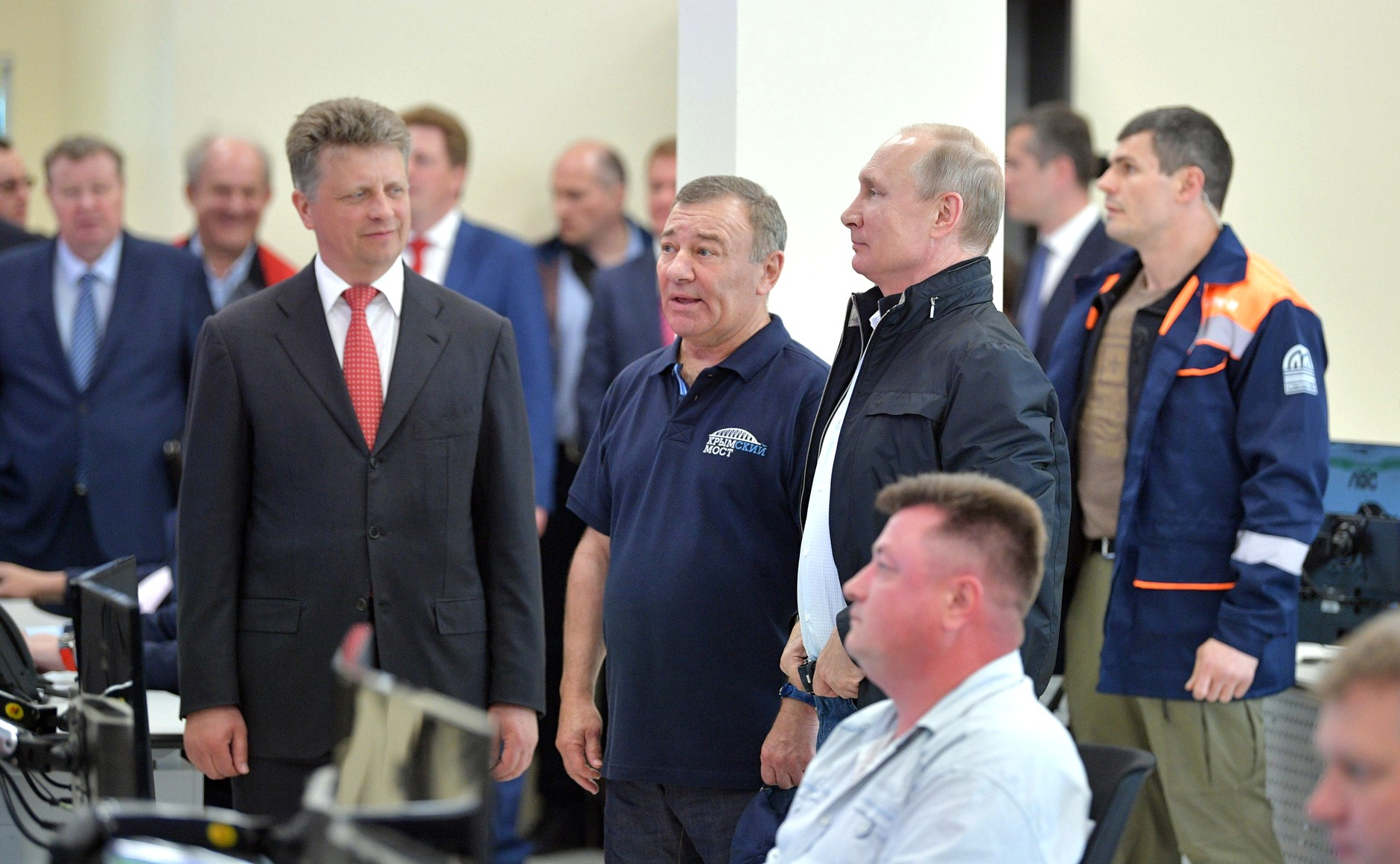
Vladimir Putin and his close confidant Arkady Rotenberg before the opening of the Crimean Bridge in May 2018

The Russian Federal Service for Communications (Roskomnadzor) warned about a transition period as Russian operators have to change the numbering capacity and subscribers. Country code will be replaced from the Ukrainian +380 to Russian +7. Codes in Crimea start with 65, but in the area of "7" the 6 is given to Kazakhstan which shares former Soviet Union +7 with Russia, so city codes have to change. The regulator assigned 869 dialling code to Sevastopol and the rest of the peninsula received a 365 code. At the time of the unification with Russia, telephone operators and Internet service providers in Crimea and Sevastopol are connected to the outside world through the territory of Ukraine. Minister of Communications of Russia, Nikolai Nikiforov announced on his Twitter account that postal codes in Crimea will now have six-figures: to the existing five-digit number the number two will be added at the beginning. For example, the Simferopol postal code 95000 will become 295000.

In the area that now forms the border between Crimea and Ukraine mining the salt lake inlets from the sea that constitute the natural borders, and in the spit of land left over stretches of no-man's-land with wire on either side was created. On early June that year Prime Minister Dmitry Medvedev signed a Government resolution No.961 dated 5 June 2014 establishing air, sea, road and railway checkpoints. The adopted decisions create a legal basis for the functioning of a checkpoint system at the Russian state border in the Republic of Crimea and Sevastopol.

In the year following the annexation, armed men seized various Crimean businesses, including banks, hotels, shipyards, farms, gas stations, a bakery, a dairy, and Yalta Film Studio. Russian media have noted this trend as "returning to the 90's," which is perceived as a period of anarchy and rule of gangs in Russia.

After 2014 the Russian government invested heavily in the peninsula's infrastructure—repairing roads, modernizing hospitals and building the Crimean Bridge that links the peninsula to the Russian mainland. Development of new sources of water was undertaken, with huge difficulties, to replace closed Ukrainian sources. In 2015, the Investigative Committee of Russia announced a number of theft and corruption cases in infrastructure projects in Crimea, for example; spending that exceeded the actual accounted costs by a factor of three. A number of Russian officials were also arrested for corruption, including head of federal tax inspection.

(According to February 2016 official Ukrainian figures) after Russia's annexation 10% of Security Service of Ukraine personnel left Crimea; accompanied by 6,000 of the pre-annexation 20,300 people strong Ukrainian army.

As result of the disputed political status of Crimea, Russian mobile operators never expanded their operations into Crimea and all mobile services are offered on the basis of "internal roaming," which caused significant controversy inside Russia. Telecoms however argued that expanding coverage to Crimea will put them at risk of Western sanctions and, as result, they will lose access to key equipment and software, none of which is produced locally.

The first five years of Crimean occupation cost Russia over $20 billion, roughly equal to two years of Russia's entire education budget.

=== Human rights situation ===
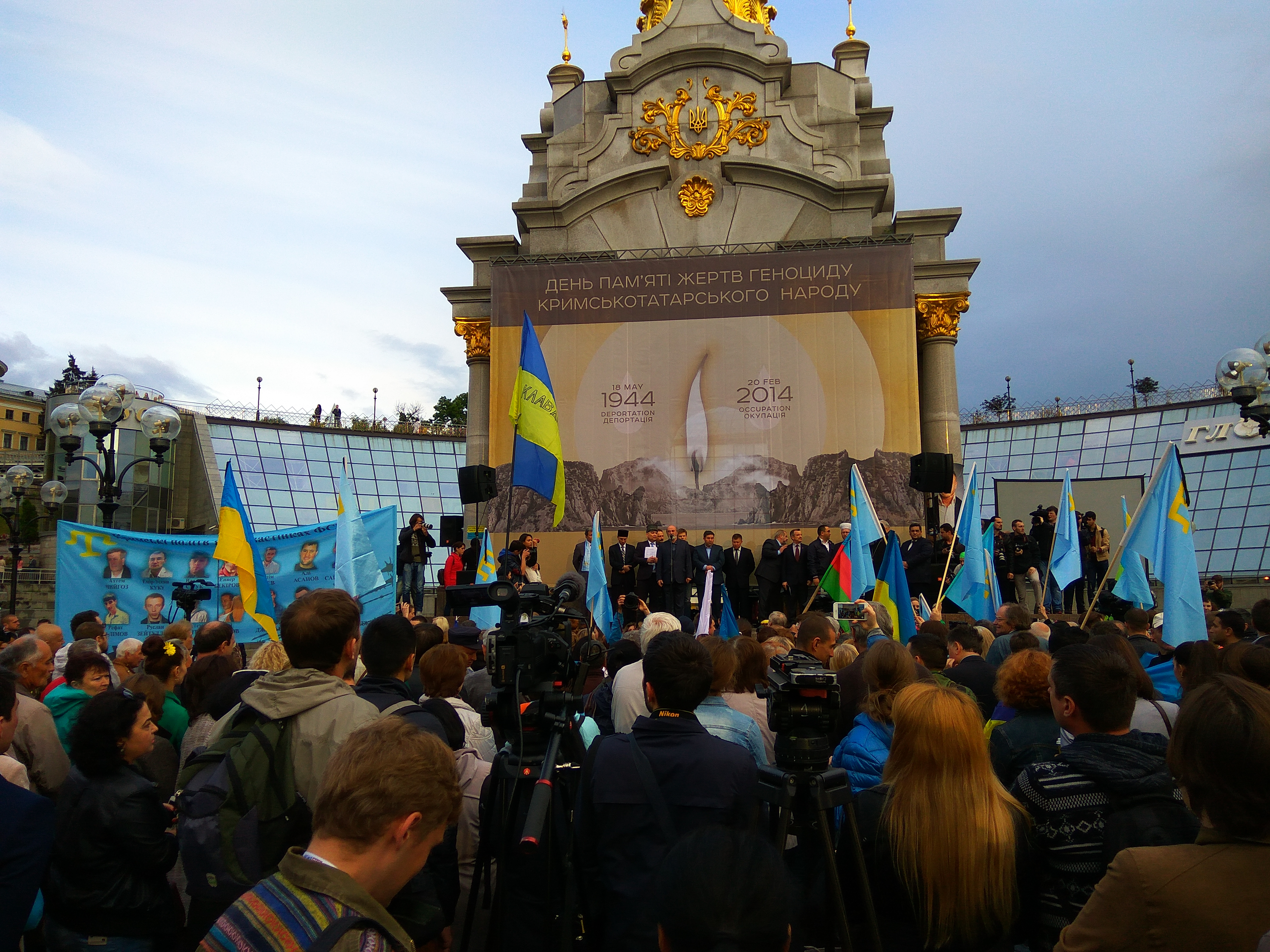
A commemoration in Kyiv likening the Deportation of the Crimean Tatars to the annexation of Crimea

According to the United Nations and multiple NGOs, Russia is responsible for multiple human rights abuses, including torture, arbitrary detention, forced disappearances and instances of discrimination, including persecution of Crimean Tatars in Crimea since the illegal annexation. The UN Human Rights Office has documented multiple human rights violations in Crimea. Noting that minority Crimean Tatars have been disproportionately affected. In December 2016, the UN General Assembly voted on a resolution on human rights in occupied Crimea. It called on the Russian Federation "to take all measures necessary to bring an immediate end to all abuses against residents of Crimea, in particular reported discriminatory measures and practices, arbitrary detentions, torture and other cruel, inhumane or degrading treatment, and to revoke all discriminatory legislation". It also urged Russia to "immediately release Ukrainian citizens who were unlawfully detained and judged without regard for elementary standards of justice".

After the annexation, Russian authorities banned Crimean Tatar organizations, filed criminal charges against Tatar leaders and journalists, and targeted the Tatar population. The Atlantic Council have described this as the practice of collective punishment, and therefore as a war crime prohibited under international humanitarian law and Geneva convention.

In March 2014, Human Rights Watch reported that pro-Ukrainian activists and journalists had been attacked, abducted, and tortured by "self-defense" groups. Some Crimeans were simply "disappeared" with no explanation.

On 9 May 2014, the new "anti-extremist" amendment to the Criminal Code of Russia, passed in December 2013, came into force. Article 280.1 designated incitement of violation of territorial integrity of the Russian Federation (incl. calls for secession of Crimea from Russia) as a criminal offense in Russia, punishable by a fine of 300 thousand roubles or imprisonment up to 3 years. If such statements are made in public media or the internet, the punishment could be obligatory works up to 480 hours or imprisonment up to five years.

According to a report released on the Russian government-run President of Russia's Council on Civil Society and Human Rights website, Tatars who were opposed to Russian rule have been persecuted, Russian law restricting freedom of speech has been imposed, and the new Russian authorities "liquidated" the Kyiv Patriarchate Orthodox church on the peninsula. The Crimean Tatar television station was also shut down by the Russian authorities.

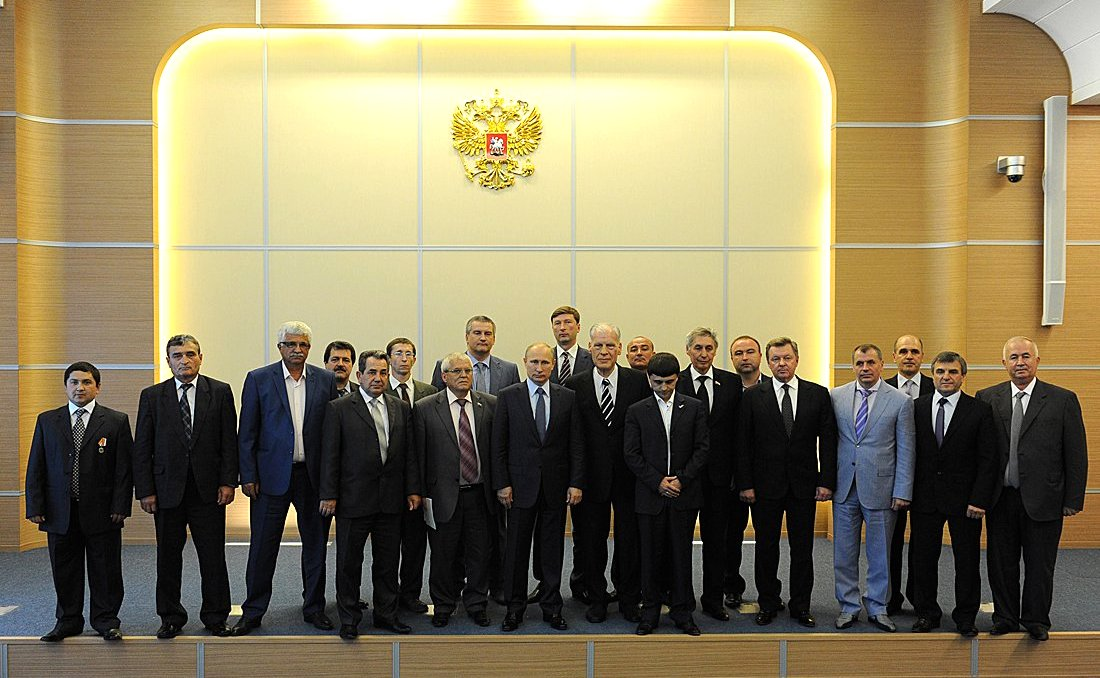
Russian president Putin meeting with representatives of the Crimean Tatars, 16 May 2014

On 16 May the new Russian authorities of Crimea issued a ban on the annual commemorations of the anniversary of the deportation of the Crimean Tatars by Stalin in 1944, citing "possibility of provocation by extremists" as a reason. Previously, when Crimea was controlled by Ukraine, these commemorations had taken place every year. The Russian-installed Crimean authorities also banned Mustafa Dzhemilev, a human rights activist, Soviet dissident, member of the Ukrainian parliament, and former chairman of the Mejlis of the Crimean Tatars from entering Crimea. Additionally, Mejlis reported, that officers of Russia's Federal Security Service (FSB) raided Tatar homes in the same week, on the pretense of "suspicion of terrorist activity". The Tatar community eventually did hold commemorative rallies in defiance of the ban. In response Russian authorities flew helicopters over the rallies in an attempt to disrupt them.

In May 2015, a local activist, Alexander Kostenko, was sentenced to four years in a penal colony. His lawyer, Dmitry Sotnikov, said that the case was fabricated and that his client had been beaten and starved. Crimean prosecutor Natalia Poklonskaya accused Kostenko of making Nazi gestures during the Maidan protests, and that they were judging "not just [Kostenko], but the very idea of fascism and Nazism, which are trying to raise their head once again". Sotnikov responded that "There are fabricated cases in Russia, but rarely such humiliation and physical harm. A living person is being tortured for a political idea, to be able to boast winning over fascism". In June 2015, Razom released a report compiling human rights abuses in Crimea. In its 2016 annual report, the Council of Europe made no mention of human rights abuses in Crimea because Russia had not allowed its monitors to enter.

In February 2016 human rights defender Emir-Usein Kuku from Crimea was arrested and accused of belonging to the Islamist organization Hizb ut-Tahrir although he denies any involvement in this organization. Amnesty International has called for his immediate release.

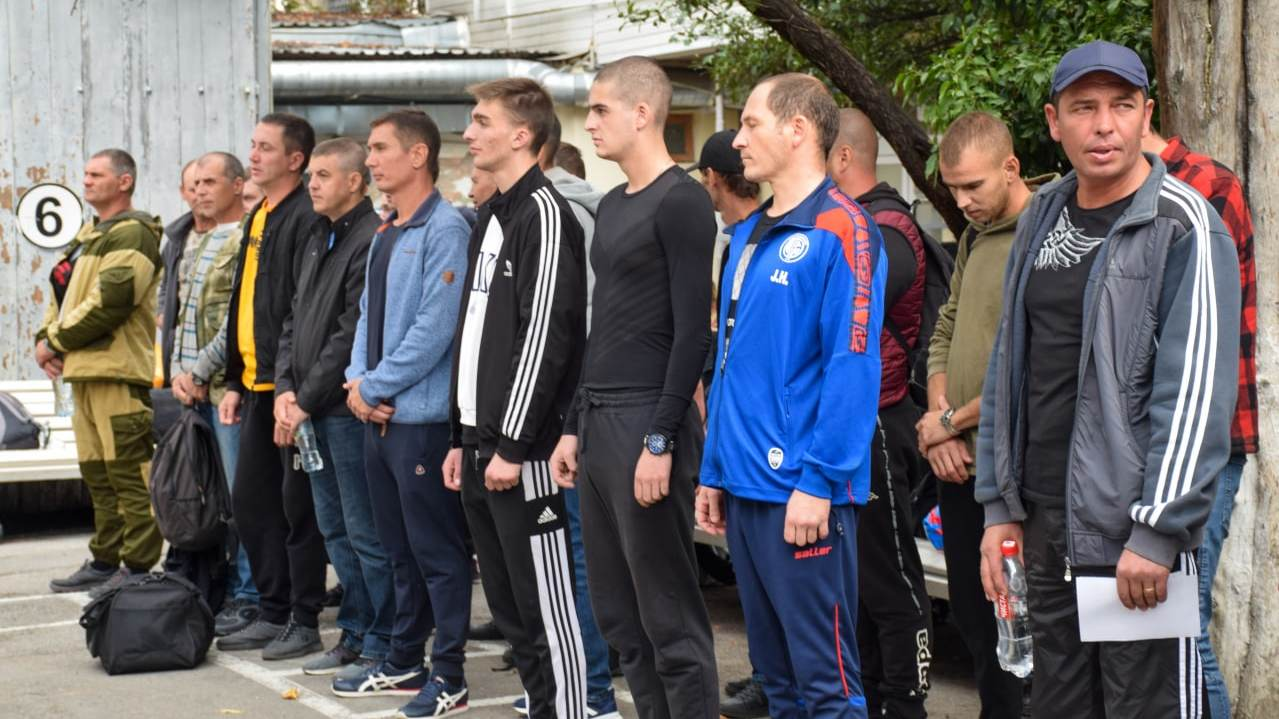
Civilians from Crimea conscripted into the Russian army during the 2022 Russian mobilization

On 24 May 2014, Ervin Ibragimov, a former member of the Bakhchysarai Town Council and a member of the World Congress of Crimean Tatars went missing. CCTV footage from a camera at a nearby shop documents that Ibragimov had been stopped by a group of men and that he is briefly speaking to the men before being forced in their van. According to the Kharkiv Human Rights Protection Group Russian authorities refuse to investigate the disappearance of Ibragimov.

In May 2018 Server Mustafayev, the founder and coordinator of the human rights movement Crimean Solidarity was imprisoned by Russian authorities and charged with "membership of a terrorist organisation". Amnesty International and Front Line Defenders demand his immediate release.

On 12 June 2018, Ukraine lodged a memorandum weighing about 90 kg, consisting of 17,500 pages of text in 29 volumes to the UN's International Court of Justice about racial discrimination by Russian authorities in occupied Crimea and state financing of terrorism by Russian Federation in Donbas.

Between 2015 and 2019 over 134,000 people living in Crimea applied for and were issued Ukrainian passports.

=== Crimean public opinion ===
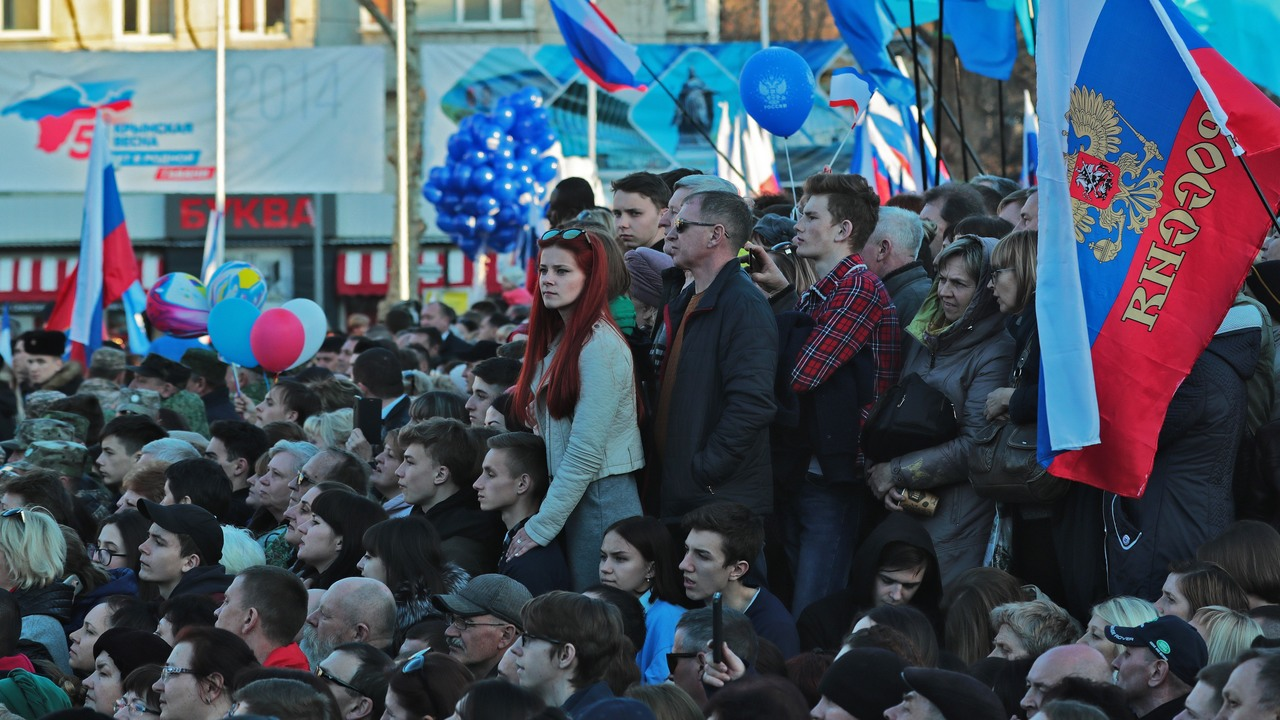
Concert to mark the fifth anniversary of annexation in Simferopol, Crimea, 18 March 2019

Prior to Russian occupation, support for joining Russia was 23% in a 2013 poll, down from 33% in 2011. A joint survey by American government agency Broadcasting Board of Governors and polling firm Gallup was taken during April 2014. It polled 500 residents of Crimea. The survey found that 82.8% of those polled believed that the results of the Crimean status referendum reflected the views of most residents of Crimea, whereas 6.7% said that it did not. 73.9% of those polled said that they thought that the annexation would have a positive impact on their lives, whereas 5.5% said that it would not. 13.6% said that they did not know.

A comprehensive poll released on 8 May 2014 by the Pew Research Center surveyed local opinions on the annexation. Despite international criticism of 16 March referendum on Crimean status, 91% of those Crimeans polled thought that the vote was free and fair, and 88% said that the Ukrainian government should recognise the results.

In a survey completed in 2019 by a Russian company FOM 72% of surveyed Crimean residents said their lives have improved since annexation. At the same time only 39% Russians living in the mainland said the annexation was beneficial for the country as a whole which marks a significant drop from 67% in 2015.

Whilst the Russian government actively cited local opinion polls to argue that the annexation was legitimate (i.e. supported by the population of the territory in question), some authors have cautioned against using surveys concerning identities and support for the annexation conducted in "oppressive political environment" of Russian-held Crimea.

== Ukrainian response ==
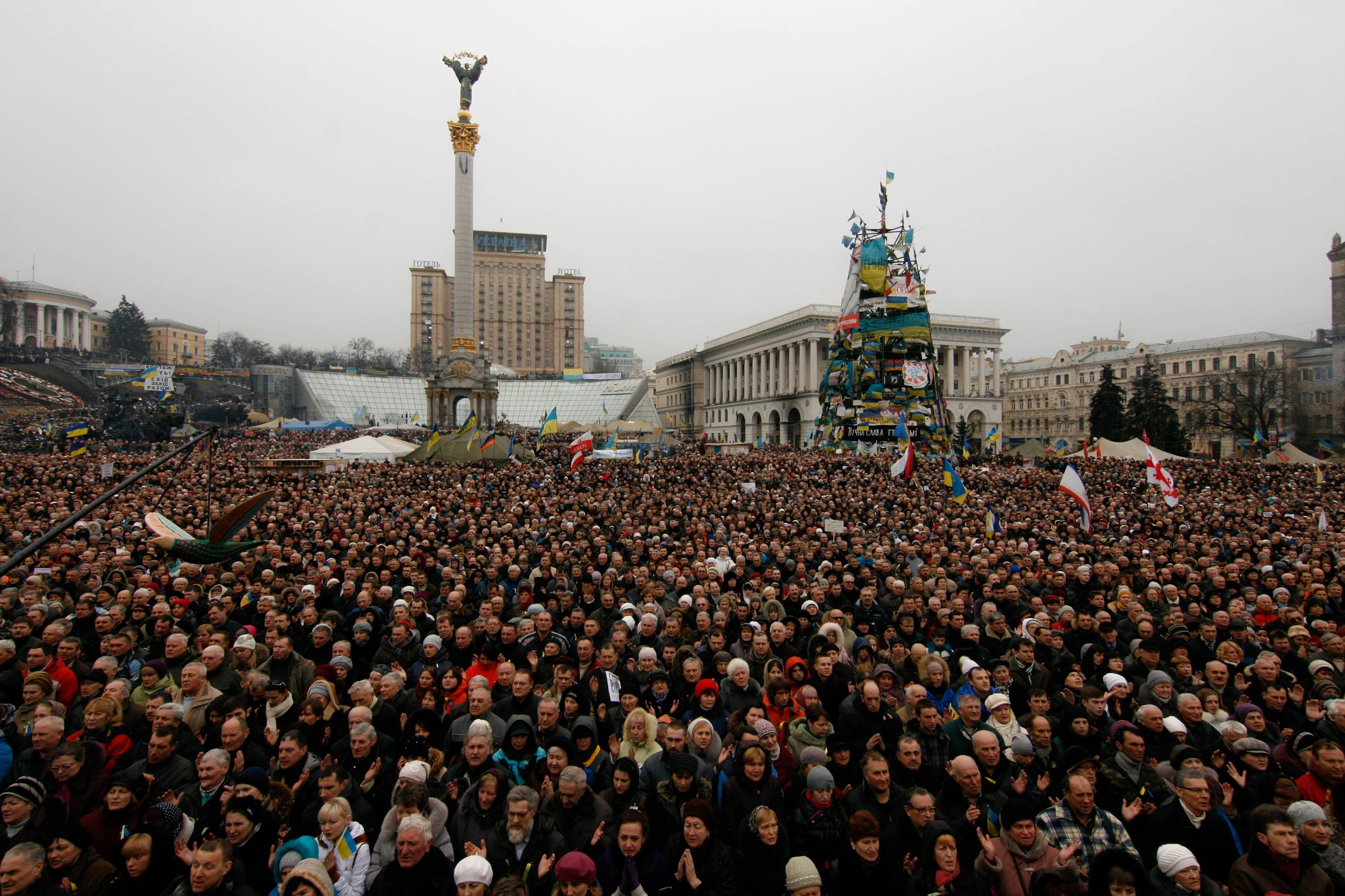
A rally in Kyiv against the Russian invasion of Crimea, 2 March 2014

Immediately after the treaty of accession was signed in March, the Ukrainian Ministry of Foreign Affairs summoned the Provisional Principal of Russia in Ukraine to present note verbale of protest against Russia's recognition of the Republic of Crimea and its subsequent annexation. Two days later, the Verkhovna Rada condemned the treaty and called Russia's actions "a gross violation of international law". The Rada called on the international community to avoid recognition of the "so-called Republic of Crimea" or the annexation of Crimea and Sevastopol by Russia as new federal subjects.

On 15 April 2014, the Verkhovna Rada declared the Autonomous Republic of Crimea and Sevastopol to be under "provisional occupation" by the Russian military and imposed travel restrictions on Ukrainians visiting Crimea. The territories were also deemed "inalienable parts of Ukraine" subject to Ukrainian law. Among other things, the special law approved by the Rada restricted foreign citizens' movements to and from the Crimean Peninsula and forbade certain types of entrepreneurship. The law also forbade activity of government bodies formed in violation of Ukrainian law and designated their acts as null and void.

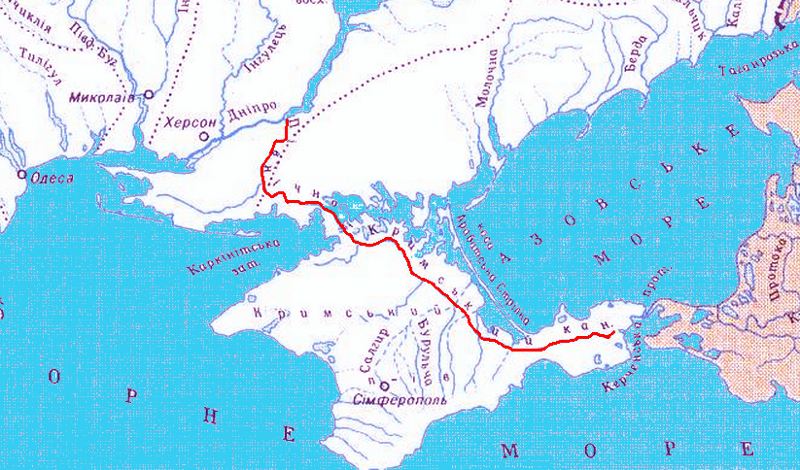
Following Russia's annexation of Crimea, Ukraine blocked the North Crimean Canal, which provided 85% of Crimea's drinking water.

Ukrainian authorities greatly reduced the volume of water flowing into Crimea via the North Crimean Canal due to huge debt for water supplied in the previous year, threatening the viability of the peninsula's agricultural crops, which are heavily dependent on irrigation.

The Ukrainian National Council for TV and Radio Broadcasting instructed all cable operators on 11 March 2014 to stop transmitting a number of Russian channels, including the international versions of the main state-controlled stations, Russia-1, Channel One and NTV, as well as news channel Russia-24.

In March 2014, activists began organising flash mobs in supermarkets to urge customers not to buy Russian goods and to boycott Russian gas stations, banks, and concerts. In April 2014, some cinemas in Kyiv, Lviv, and Odesa began shunning Russian films.

On 2 December 2014, Ukraine created a Ministry of Information Policy, with one of its goals being, according to first Minister of Information, Yuriy Stets, to counteract "Russian information aggression".

In December 2014, Ukraine halted all train and bus services to Crimea.

On 16 September 2015, the Ukrainian parliament voted for the law that sets 20 February 2014 as the official date of the Russian temporary occupation of the Crimean Peninsula. On 7 October 2015, the president of Ukraine signed the law into force.

The Ministry of Temporarily Occupied Territories and IDPs was established by the Ukrainian government on 20 April 2016 to manage occupied parts of Donetsk, Luhansk and Crimea regions affected by Russian military intervention of 2014. By 2015, the number of IDPs registered in Ukraine who had fled from Russian-occupied Crimea was 50,000.

== Russian response ==
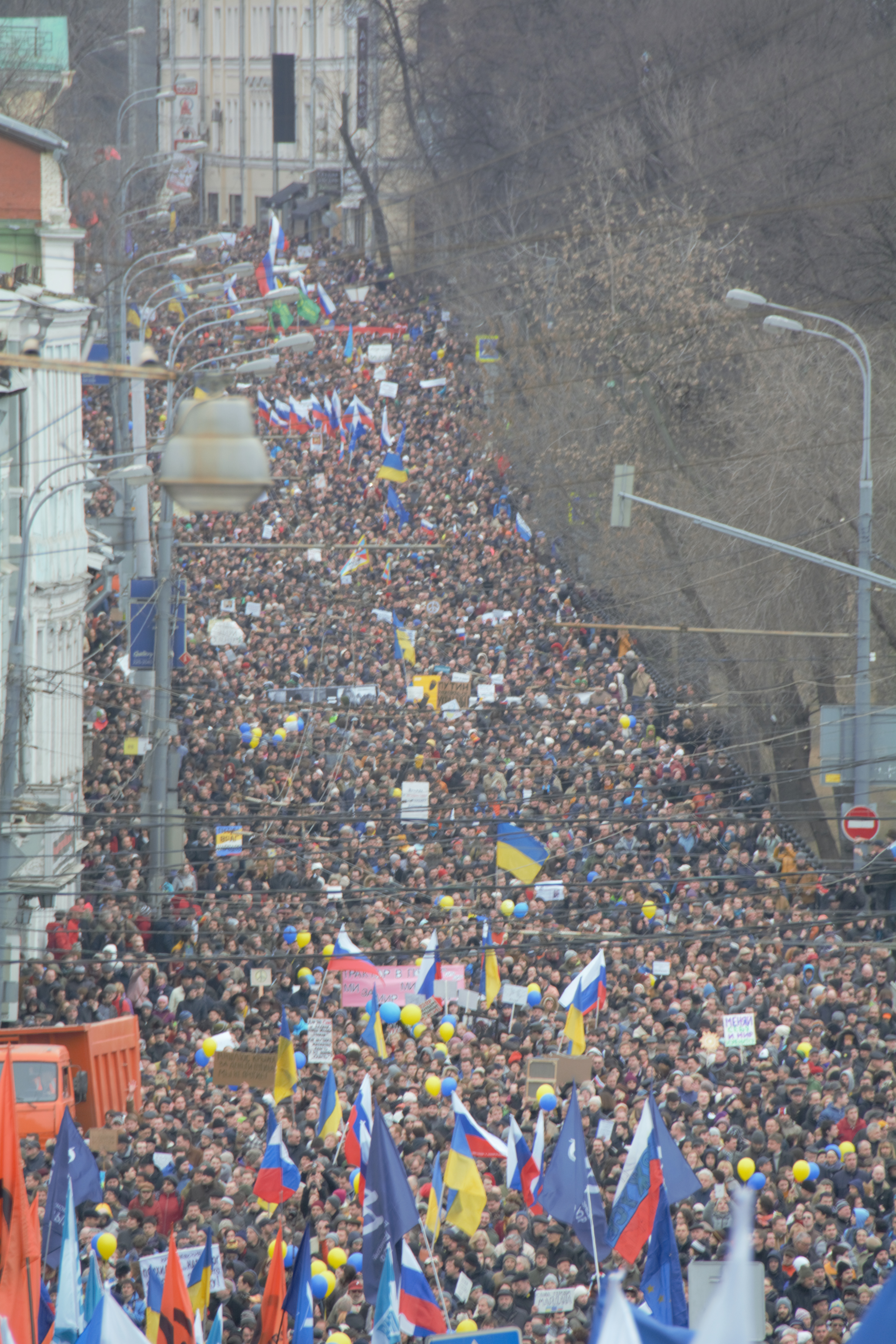
At least 30,000 people at 15 March protests, named March of Peace, which took place in Moscow a day before the Crimean referendum

In a poll published on 24 February 2014 by the state-owned Russian Public Opinion Research Center, only 15% of those Russians polled said 'yes' to the question: "Should Russia react to the overthrow of the legally elected authorities in Ukraine?"

The State Duma Committee on Commonwealth of Independent States Affairs, headed by Leonid Slutsky, visited Simferopol on 25 February 2014 and said: "If the parliament of the Crimean autonomy or its residents express the wish to join the Russian Federation, Russia will be prepared to consider this sort of application. We will be examining the situation and doing so fast". They also stated that in the event of a referendum for the Crimea region joining the Russian Federation, they would consider its results "very fast". Later Slutsky announced that he was misunderstood by the Crimean press, and no decision regarding simplifying the process of acquiring Russian citizenship for people in Crimea had been made yet. He also added that if "fellow Russian citizens are in jeopardy, you understand that we do not stay away". On 25 February, in a meeting with Crimean politicians, he stated that Viktor Yanukovych was still the legitimate president of Ukraine. That same day, the Russian Duma announced it was determining measures so that Russians in Ukraine who "did not want to break from the Russian world" could acquire Russian citizenship.

On 27 February, the Russian governing agencies presented the new law project on granting citizenship.

The Russian Ministry of Foreign Affairs called on the West and particularly NATO to "abandon the provocative statements and respect the neutral status of Ukraine". In its statement, the ministry claims that the agreement on settlement of the crisis, which was signed on 21 February and was witnessed by foreign ministries from Germany, Poland and France had to this date, not been implemented (Vladimir Lukin from Russia had not signed it).

On 28 February, according to ITAR-TASS, the Russian Ministry of Transport discontinued further talks with Ukraine in regards to the Crimean Bridge project. However, on 3 March Dmitry Medvedev, then Prime Minister of Russia, signed a decree creating a subsidiary of Russian Highways (Avtodor) to build a bridge at an unspecified location along the Kerch Strait.

On Russian social networks, there was a movement to gather volunteers who served in the Russian army to go to Ukraine. Many political researchers consider that after the annexation a social period in Russia coined as "Crimean consensus" begun, during which the "Rally 'round the flag" effect was observed in the population.

On 28 February, President Putin stated in telephone calls with key EU leaders that it was of "extreme importance of not allowing a further escalation of violence and the necessity of a rapid normalisation of the situation in Ukraine". Already on 19 February the Russian Ministry of Foreign Affairs had referred to the Euromaidan revolution as the "Brown revolution".

In Moscow, on 2 March, an estimated 27,000 rallied in support of the Russian government's decision to intervene in Ukraine. The rallies received considerable attention on Russian state TV and were officially approved by the government.

Meanwhile, on 1 March, five people who were picketing next to the Federation Council building against the invasion of Ukraine were arrested. The next day about 200 people protested at the building of the Russian Ministry of Defence in Moscow against Russian military involvement. About 500 people also gathered to protest on the Manezhnaya Square in Moscow, and the same number of people on the Saint Isaac's Square in Saint Petersburg. On 2 March, about eleven protesters demonstrated in Yekaterinburg against Russian involvement, with some wrapped in the Ukrainian flag. Protests were also held in Chelyabinsk on the same day. Opposition to the military intervention was also expressed by rock musician Andrey Makarevich, who wrote in particular: "You want war with Ukraine? It will not be the way it was with Abkhazia: the folks on the Maidan have been hardened and know what they are fighting for – for their country, their independence. ... We have to live with them. Still neighborly. And preferably in friendship. But it's up to them how they want to live". The Professor of the Department of Philosophy at the Moscow State Institute of International Relations Andrey Zubov was fired for his article in Vedomosti, criticising Russian military intervention.

On 2 March, one Moscow resident protested against Russian intervention by holding a "Stop the war" banner, but he was immediately harassed by passers-by. Police then proceeded to arrest him. A woman came forward with a fabricated charge against him, of beating up a child; however, her claim, due to lack of a victim and obviously false, was ignored by the police. Andrei Zubov, a professor at the Moscow State Institute of International Relations, who compared Russian actions in Crimea to the 1938 Annexation of Austria by Nazi Germany, was threatened. Alexander Chuyev, the leader of the pro-Kremlin Spravedlivaya Rossiya party, also objected to Russian intervention in Ukraine. Boris Akunin, a popular Russian writer, predicted that Russia's moves would lead to political and economic isolation.

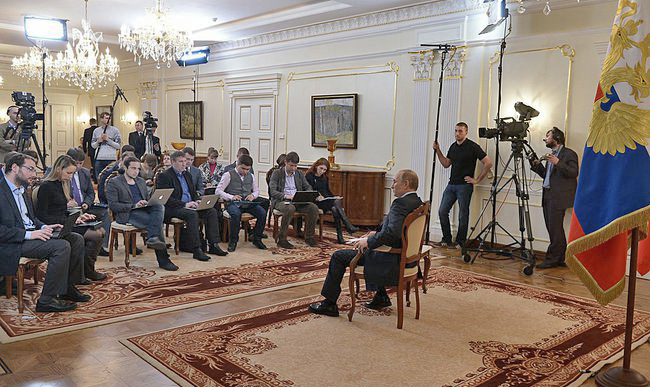
Russian president Vladimir Putin (seated, middle) speaks to the press on 4 March 2014, denouncing the Revolution of Dignity as an "unconstitutional coup", and insisting that Moscow has a right to protect Russians in Ukraine.

President Putin's approval rating among the Russian public increased by nearly 10% since the crisis began, up to 71.6%, the highest in three years, according to a poll conducted by the All-Russian Center for Public Opinion Research, released on 19 March. Additionally, the same poll showed that more than 90% of Russians supported unification with the Crimean Republic. According to a 2021 study in the American Political Science Review, "three quarters of those who rallied to Putin after Russia annexed Crimea were engaging in at least some form of dissembling and that this rallying developed as a rapid cascade, with social media joining television in fueling perceptions this was socially desirable".

On 4 March, at a press conference in Novo-Ogaryovo, President Putin expressed his view on the situation that if a revolution took place in Ukraine, it would be a new country with which Russia had not concluded any treaties. He offered an analogy with the events of 1917 in Russia, when as a result of the revolution the Russian Empire fell apart and a new state was created. However, he stated Ukraine would still have to honour its debts.

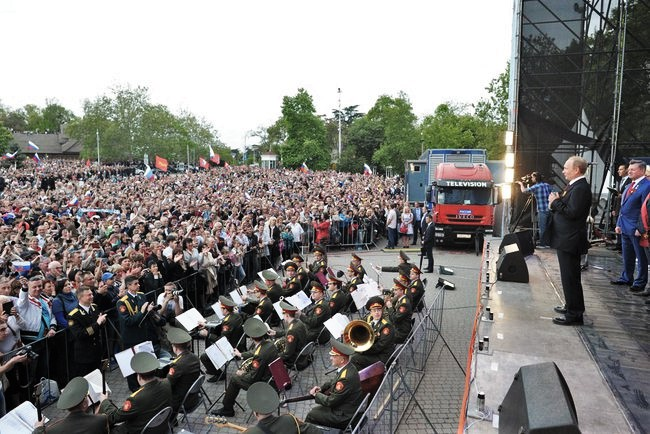
Around 100,000 people gathered in Crimean Sevastopol at Victory Day parade.

Russian politicians speculated that there were already 143,000 Ukrainian refugees in Russia. The Ukrainian Ministry of Foreign Affairs refuted those claims of refugee increases in Russia. At a briefing on 4 March 2014, the director of the department of information policy of the Ministry of Foreign Affairs of Ukraine Yevhen Perebyinis said that Russia was misinforming its own citizens as well as the entire international community to justify its own actions in the Crimea.

On 5 March, an anchor of the Russian-controlled TV channel RT America, Abby Martin, criticized her employer's biased coverage of the military invervention. Also on 5 March 2014, another RT America anchor, Liz Wahl, of the network's Washington, DC bureau, resigned on air, explaining that she could not be "part of a network that whitewashes the actions of Putin" and citing her Hungarian ancestry and the memory of the Soviet repression of the Hungarian Uprising as a factor in her decision.

In early March, Igor Andreyev, a 75-year-old survivor of the Siege of Leningrad, attended an anti-war rally against the Russian intervention in Crimea and was holding a sign that read "Peace to the World". The riot police arrested him, and a local pro-government lawyer then accused him of being a supporter of "fascism". The retiree, who lived on a 6,500-ruble monthly pension, was fined 10,000 rubles.

Prominent dissident Mikhail Khodorkovsky said that Crimea should stay within Ukraine with broader autonomy.

Tatarstan, a republic within Russia populated by Volga Tatars, has sought to alleviate concerns about the treatment of Tatars by Russia, as Tatarstan is an oil-rich and economically successful republic in Russia. On 5 March, President of Tatarstan Rustam Minnikhanov signed an agreement on co-operation between Tatarstan and the Aksyonov government in Crimea that implied collaboration between ten government institutions as well as significant financial aid to Crimea from Tatarstan businesses. On 11 March, Minnikhanov was in Crimea on his second visit and attended as a guest in the Crimean parliament chamber during the vote on the declaration of sovereignty pending 16 March referendum. The Tatarstan's Mufti Kamil Samigullin invited Crimean Tatars to study in madrasas in Kazan, and declared support for their "brothers in faith and blood". Mustafa Dzhemilev, a former leader of the Crimean Tatar Majlis, believed that forces that were suspected to be Russian forces should leave the Crimean Peninsula, and asked the UN Security Council to send peacekeepers into the region.

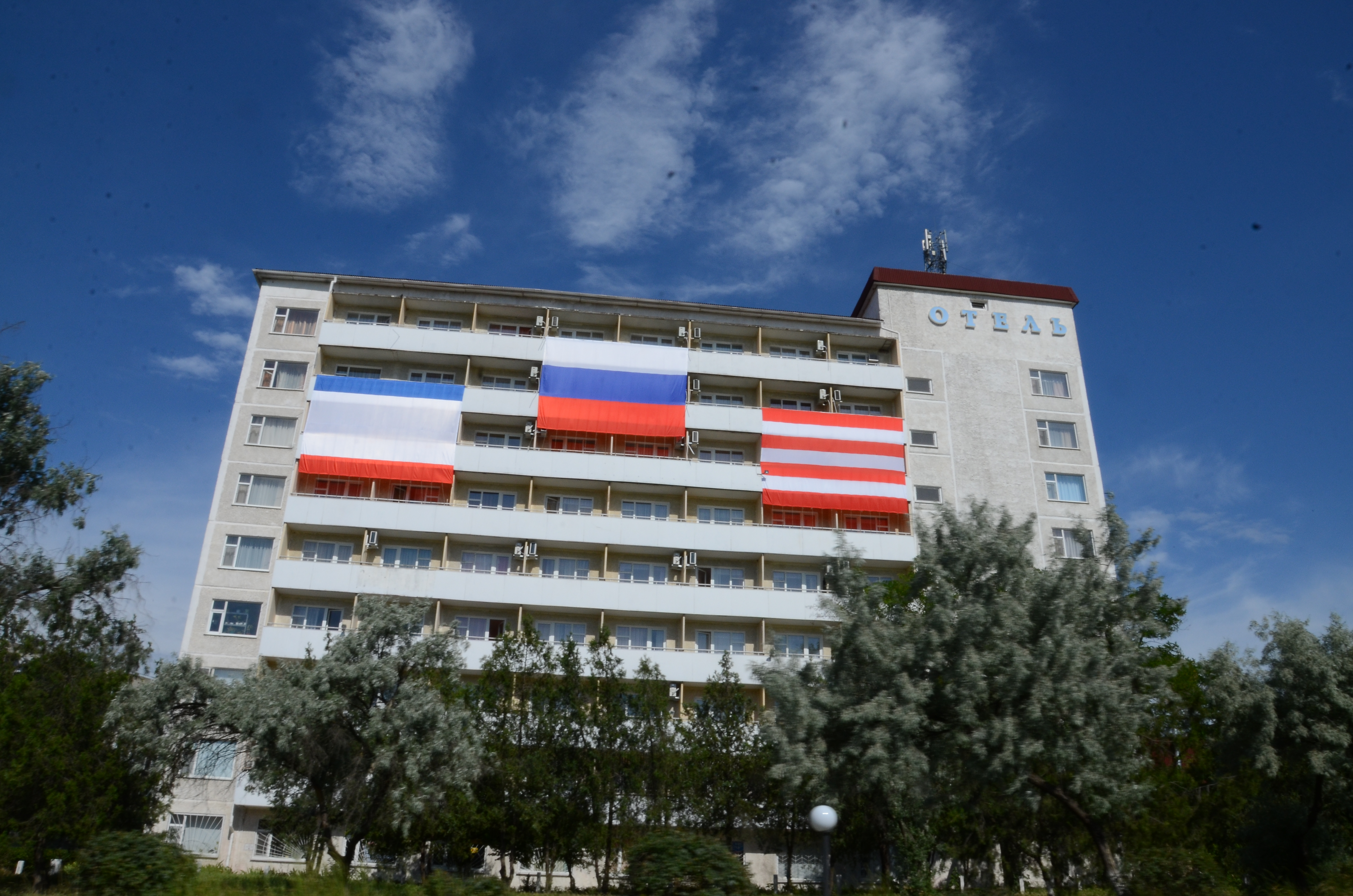
Hotel in Kerch, Crimea, 2015

On 15 March, thousands of protesters (estimates varying from 3,000 by official sources up to 50,000 claimed by the opposition) in Moscow marched against Russian involvement in Ukraine, many waving Ukrainian flags. At the same time, a pro-government (and pro-referendum) rally occurred across the street, counting in the thousands as well (officials claiming 27,000 with the opposition claiming about 10,000).

In June 2015 Mikhail Kasyanov stated that all Russian Duma decisions on Crimea annexation were illegal from the international point of view and the annexation was provoked by false accusations of discrimination of Russian nationals in Ukraine.

As of January 2019, Arkady Rotenberg through his Stroygazmontazh LLC and his companies building the Crimean Bridge along with Nikolai Shamalov and Yuri Kovalchuk through their Rossiya Bank have become the most important investors in Russia's development of the annexed Crimea.

== International response ==
International reaction to the 2014 Crimean crisis according to official governmental statements. (Note: If an official position can be sorted in more than one category, the "strongest" position was marked (from the "call for a peaceful resolution" to "interpretation as a military intervention" consecutively). For the sources see the image description.) Condemnation of Russian actions as a military intervention or invasion Condemnation of Russian actions Support for Ukrainian territorial integrity Statements only voicing concern or hope for peaceful resolution to the conflict Recognition of Russian interests Support for Russian actions and/or condemnation of the Ukrainian interim government Ukraine Russia No official statements / No data available

There has been a range of international reactions to the annexation. In March 2014, the UN General Assembly passed a non-binding resolution 100 in favour, 11 against and 58 abstentions in the 193-nation assembly that declared Crimea's Moscow-backed referendum invalid. In a move supported by the Lithuanian president, the United States government imposed sanctions against persons they deem to have violated or assisted in the violation of Ukraine's sovereignty. The European Union suspended talks with Russia on economic and visa-related matters, and is considering more stringent sanctions against Russia in the near future, including asset freezes. while Japan announced sanctions which include suspension of talks relating to military, space, investment, and visa requirements. The United Kingdom qualified the referendum vote in Crimea of being "farcical", "illegal" and "illegitimate".

Ukraine and other countries said that Russia signed several treaties guaranteeing Ukrainian territorial integrity. These include the 1991 Belavezha Accords that established the Commonwealth of Independent States, the 1975 Helsinki Accords, the 1994 Budapest Memorandum on Security Assurances and the 1997 Treaty on friendship, cooperation and partnership between the Russian Federation and Ukraine.

The European Commission decided on 11 March 2014 to enter into a full free-trade agreement with Ukraine within the year. On 12 March, the European Parliament rejected the upcoming referendum on independence in Crimea, which they saw as manipulated and contrary to international and Ukrainian law. The G7 bloc of developed nations (the G8 minus Russia) made a joint statement condemning Russia and announced that they would suspend preparations for the planned G8 summit in Sochi in June. NATO condemned Russia's occupation of Crimea and stated that it was a breach of international law while the Council of Europe expressed its full support for the territorial integrity and national unity of Ukraine. The Visegrád Group has issued a joint statement urging Russia to respect Ukraine's territorial integrity and for Ukraine to take into account its minority groups to not further break fragile relations. It has urged for Russia to respect Ukrainian and international law and in line with the provisions of the 1994 Budapest Memorandum.

NATO secretary general Anders Fogh Rasmussen said in a speech on 19 March 2014:

The annexation of Crimea through a so-called referendum held at gunpoint is illegal and illegitimate. ... it undermines our security. Not just NATO's or Ukraine's security, but also Russia's. If the rules don't apply, if agreements are not honored, certainly Russia also stands to suffer the consequences. ... Russia was among those who committed in 1994 to respect Ukraine's territorial integrity and sovereignty. Russia pledged not to threaten or use force against Ukraine. By turning its back on that agreement, Russia has called into question its credibility and reliability ... No one wants to turn away from our cooperation with Russia. But no one can ignore that Russia has violated the very principles upon which that cooperation is built.

On 1 April 2014, NATO foreign ministers issued a joint statement condemning "Russia's illegal and illegitimate attempt to annex Crimea" and announcing, "We have decided to suspend all practical civilian and military cooperation between NATO and Russia. Our political dialogue in the NATO-Russia Council can continue, as necessary".

China said "We respect the independence, sovereignty and territorial integrity of Ukraine". A spokesman restated China's belief of non-interference in the internal affairs of other nations and urged dialogue.

The Indian government called for a peaceful resolution of the situation. Both Syria and Venezuela openly supported Russian military action. Syrian president Bashar al-Assad said that he supports Putin's efforts to "restore security and stability in the friendly country of Ukraine", while Venezuelan President Nicolás Maduro condemned Ukraine's "ultra-nationalist" coup. Sri Lanka described Yanukovych's removal as unconstitutional and considered Russia's concerns in Crimea as justified.

Polish prime minister Donald Tusk called for a change in EU energy policy as Germany's dependence on Russian gas poses risks for Europe.

On 13 March 2014, German Chancellor Angela Merkel warned the Russian government it risks massive damage to Russia, economically and politically, if it refuses to change course on Ukraine, though close economic links between Germany and Russia significantly reduce the scope for any sanctions.

After Russia moved to formally incorporate Crimea, some worried whether it may do the same in other regions. US deputy national security advisor Tony Blinken said that the Russian troops massed on the eastern Ukrainian border may be preparing to enter the country's eastern regions. Russian officials stated that Russian troops would not enter other areas. US Air Force Gen. Philip M. Breedlove, NATO's supreme allied commander in Europe, warned that the same troops were in a position to take over the separatist Russian-speaking Moldovan province of Transnistria. President of Moldova Nicolae Timofti warned Russia with not attempting to do this to avoid damaging its international status further.

On 9 April, the Parliamentary Assembly of the Council of Europe deprived Russia of voting rights.

On 14 August, while visiting Crimea, Vladimir Putin ruled out pushing beyond Crimea. He undertook to do everything he could to end the conflict in Ukraine, saying Russia needed to build calmly and with dignity, not by confrontation and war which isolated it from the rest of the world.

=== United Nations resolutions ===
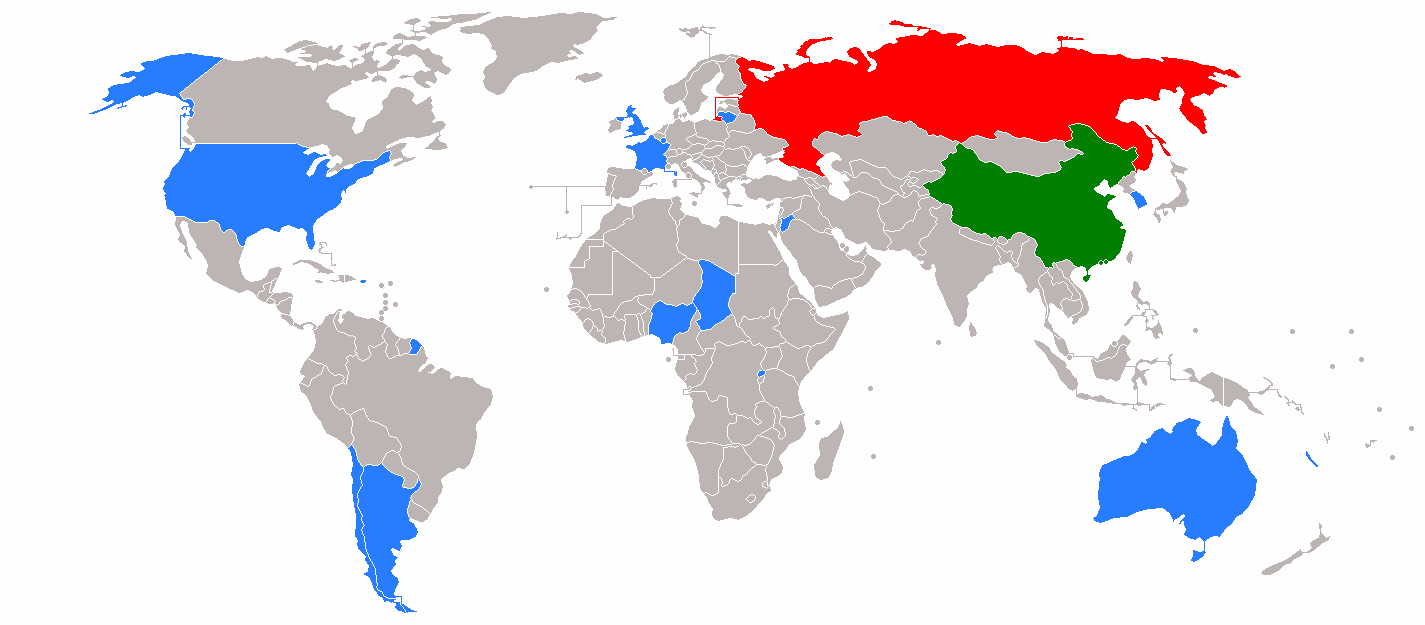
UN Security Council vote on a draft resolution condemning the 2014 Crimean referendum.
Voted in favour of the resolution
Abstained
Vetoed the resolution

UN General Assembly vote on the resolution condemning the 2014 Crimean referendum.
In favour of considering the referendum illegal
Abstained
Absent when the vote took place
Against adopting the resolution

On 15 March 2014, a US-sponsored resolution that went to a vote in the UN Security Council to reaffirm that council's commitment to Ukraine's "sovereignty, independence, unity and territorial integrity" was not approved. Though a total of 13 council members voted in favour of the resolution and China abstained, Russia vetoed the resolution.

On 27 March 2014, the UN General Assembly approved a resolution describing the referendum leading to annexation of Crimea by Russia as illegal. The draft resolution, which was titled "Territorial integrity of Ukraine", was co-sponsored by Canada, Costa Rica, Germany, Lithuania, Poland, Ukraine and the US. It affirmed the council's commitment to the "sovereignty, political independence, unity and territorial integrity of Ukraine within its internationally recognised borders". The resolution tried to underscore that 16 March referendum held in Crimea and the city of Sevastopol has no validity and cannot form the basis for any alteration of the status of the Autonomous Republic of Crimea or of the city of Sevastopol. The resolution got 100 votes in its favour, while 11 nations voted against and 58 countries abstained from the vote. The resolution was non-binding and the vote was largely symbolic.

Since 2014, the UN General Assembly has voted several times, most recently in December 2019, to affirm Ukraine's territorial integrity, condemn the 'temporary occupation' of Crimea, and reaffirm nonrecognition of its annexation.

=== International recognition ===
Afghanistan, Cuba, North Korea, Kyrgyzstan, Nicaragua, Sudan, Syria, and Zimbabwe have recognised the result of the 2014 referendum in Crimea.

Four non-UN member states recognised the results of the referendum: Abkhazia, South Ossetia, Artsakh and Transnistria. The Transnistrian foreign minister, Nina Shtanski, recognized Crimea's annexation by Russia. Transnistria sent a request on 18 March 2014 to join the Russian Federation following the Crimean example and in compliance with the Admission Law provisions. The regional councils of Italy's northern regions Lombardy, Liguria and Veneto adopted a non-binding resolution on recognizing Crimea as part of Russia, but they revoked it in 2022 after Russia invaded Ukraine.

=== Sanctions ===
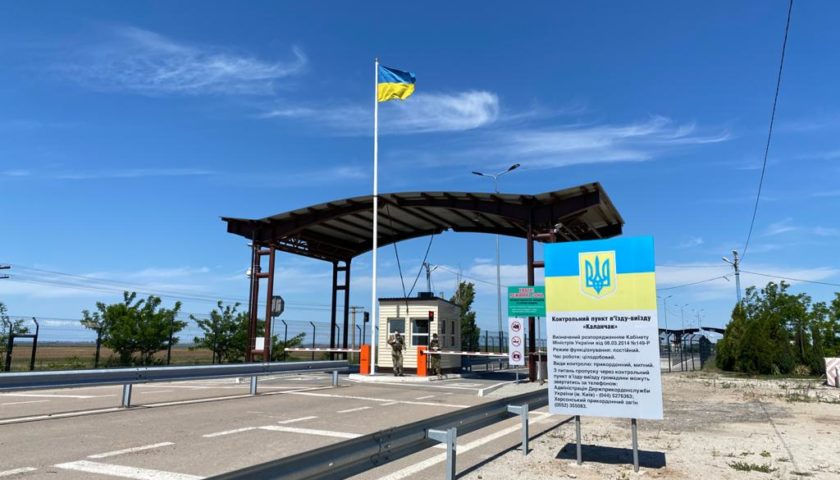
Ukrainian checkpoint at Kalanchak, entering Kherson Oblast from Russian-occupied Crimea

Sanctions were imposed to prevent officials and politicians from travelling to Canada, the United States, or the European Union. They were the most wide-ranging applied to Russia since the fall of the Soviet Union.

Japan announced milder sanctions than the US and EU. These include suspension of talks relating to military, space, investment, and visa requirements.

In response to the sanctions introduced by the US and EU, the Russian Duma unanimously passed a resolution asking for all members of the Duma to be included on the sanctions list. Head of the Just Russia party Sergei Mironov said he was proud of being included on the sanctions list: "It is with pride that I have found myself on the black list, this means they have noticed my stance on Crimea". Russian companies started pulling billions of dollars out of Western banks to avoid having their asset frozen.

Three days after the lists were published, the Russian Foreign Ministry published a reciprocal sanctions list of US citizens, which consisted of 10 names, including House Speaker John Boehner, Senator John McCain, and two advisers to President Obama. The ministry said: "We have repeatedly warned that sanctions are a double-edged instrument and would hit the United States like a boomerang". Several of those sanctioned responded with pride at their inclusion on the list, including John Boehner, John McCain, Bob Menendez, Dan Coats, Mary Landrieu, and Harry Reid.

On 24 March, Russia imposed retaliatory sanctions on 13 Canadian officials including members of the Parliament of Canada, banning them from entering Russia. Foreign Affairs Minister John Baird, said the sanctions were "a badge of honour". Former Minister of Justice Irwin Cotler also said that he considered the sanctions a badge of honour, not a mark of exclusion.

"The good news is that so far, Russia has shown no inclination to use the Northern Distribution Network as leverage in the wake of US retaliation for its troop movements in Crimea".

Expanded Western sanctions in mid-March coursed through financial markets, hitting the business interests of some of Russia's richest people. The Americans centred on the heart of Moscow's leadership, though the EU's initial list shied from targeting Putin's inner circle. As ratings agencies Fitch and Standard & Poor's downgraded Russia's credit outlook, Russian banks warned of a sanctions-induced recession, the country braced for capital outflows for the first three months of 2014 to reach $70 billion, more than the entirety of outflows for 2013, and Russian government-bond issues plummeted by three-quarters compared with the same period the previous year. Novatek, Russia's second-largest gas producer, saw $2.5bn in market value wiped out when its shares sank by nearly 10%, rendering Putin's close friend Gennady Timchenko, who has a 23% stake in the company, $575m poorer. "I do hope that there is some serious diplomatic activity going on behind the scenes," said one Russian banker, though others were more sanguine on the question of whether the sanctions would have any enduring effect, and Russians, top and bottom, seemed defiant. The official Russian response was mixed.

The then Minister of Economic Development of the Russian Federation Alexey Ulyukaev said that introduction of sectoral sanctions will lead to a serious decline of the Russian economy: economic growth of Russia will become seriously negative, the growth of volumes of investment will be even more negative, inflation will rise, and government revenues and reserves will go down.

As well as differences between the United States and Europe as a whole as to how to respond to the Russian-backed incursion, those same differences have played out among Eastern European countries.

A number of Russian citizens reported that they have been denied European visas after they visited Crimea after annexation. A Russian consumer protection watchdog OZPP published a warning for Russian tourists about this risk, explaining that from the international law point of view, Crimea is an occupied territory, after which Roskomnadzor blocked the OZPP website "for threatening territorial integrity of Russian Federation".

In response to having its voting rights revoked, Russia in June 2017 suspended its budget payments to the Council of Europe, with Russian foreign minister Sergei Lavrov stating payments would not resume until all rights of Russia's delegation were fully restored. Council Secretary General Thorbjørn Jagland has suggested lifting the sanctions to avoid the impact of mounting budgetary restraints. However, Council members such as Ukraine and its supporters have argued that readmitting Russia without demanding concessions in return would amount to "caving to Russian 'blackmail'".

=== Mapping ===
Location of the Crimea Federal District within Russia in 2014

- The United Nations maps Crimea as belonging to Ukraine.
- National Geographic Society stated that their policy is "to portray current reality" and "Crimea, if it is formally annexed by Russia, would be shaded gray", but also further remarked that this step does not suggest recognising the legitimacy of such. As of April 2014, Crimea was still displayed as part of Ukraine.
- As of April 2014, Google Maps displays Crimea as a disputed territory to most viewers. For the Russian and Ukrainian versions of the website, Crimea is marked as belonging to the corresponding country (Russia or Ukraine respectively). Google stated that it "work(s) with sources to get the best interpretation of the border or claim lines".
- Yandex displays Crimea as part of Russia for .ru and .com domains since the end of March 2014. According to the official statement, the company works with users from different countries and "displays reality that surrounds them".
- As of March 2014, Bing Maps, OpenStreetMap and HERE displayed Crimea as belonging to Ukraine. In particular, OpenStreetMap requested its users to refrain from editing borders and administrative relations of subdivisions located in the Autonomous Republic of Crimea and Sevastopol until 31 May 2014. On 5 June 2014, OpenStreetMap switched to a territorial dispute option, displaying Crimea as a disputed territory belonging to both countries.
- In 2015, on the PepsiCo website, a Russian-language map was visible for a few days that depicted Crimea as a part of Russia.
- The 2016 edition of a French atlas published by Larousse shows Crimea as part of Russian territory: Oleh Shamshur, Ukrainian Ambassador to France, expressed shock. Shortly after, Larousse changed the map to reflect Crimea as part of Ukraine on the Atlas on their internet version.
- The Italian-language magazine of geopolitics Limes maps Crimea as a part of Russia since December 2015. Following protests from the Ukrainian embassy in Italy, the magazine editor Lucio Caracciolo wrote that "the map reflects reality. When Crimea and Sevastopol will be back under effective Ukrainian sovereignty, we will produce a map that reflects such reality".
- The Russian version of Apple's App Store began to show Crimea as part of Russia on 27 November 2019.

== Analysis ==
Researchers consider the annexation of Crimea to be a coup, because the Russian military seized Crimea's parliament and government buildings and instigated the replacement of its government with Russian proxies. In particular, political scientist Olga Burlyuk defines Crimea events as "a coup d'état of a regional scale".

Crimea's annexation has been described as an instance of modern Russian imperialism. It was the first time since World War II that a European country had annexed part of another. Some analysts see the annexation as the beginning of a Second Cold War between Russia and the West.

== See also ==
- Russian invasion of Ukraine
- Russian annexation of Donetsk, Kherson, Luhansk and Zaporizhzhia oblasts (2022)
- Outline of the Russo-Ukrainian War
- Prelude to the Russian invasion of Ukraine
- 1783 Russian annexation of Crimea
- Proposed Russian annexation of South Ossetia
- Proposed Russian annexation of Transnistria
- Russian-occupied territories
  - Occupied territories of Georgia
  - Occupied territories of Moldova
  - Occupied territories of Ukraine
- Russian imperialism
- Russian irredentism
