= Capture of Belbek Airport =

Part of the Russo-Ukrainian War

Coordinates: 44.694°N 33.591°E

- Part of the Annexation of Crimea by the Russian Federation
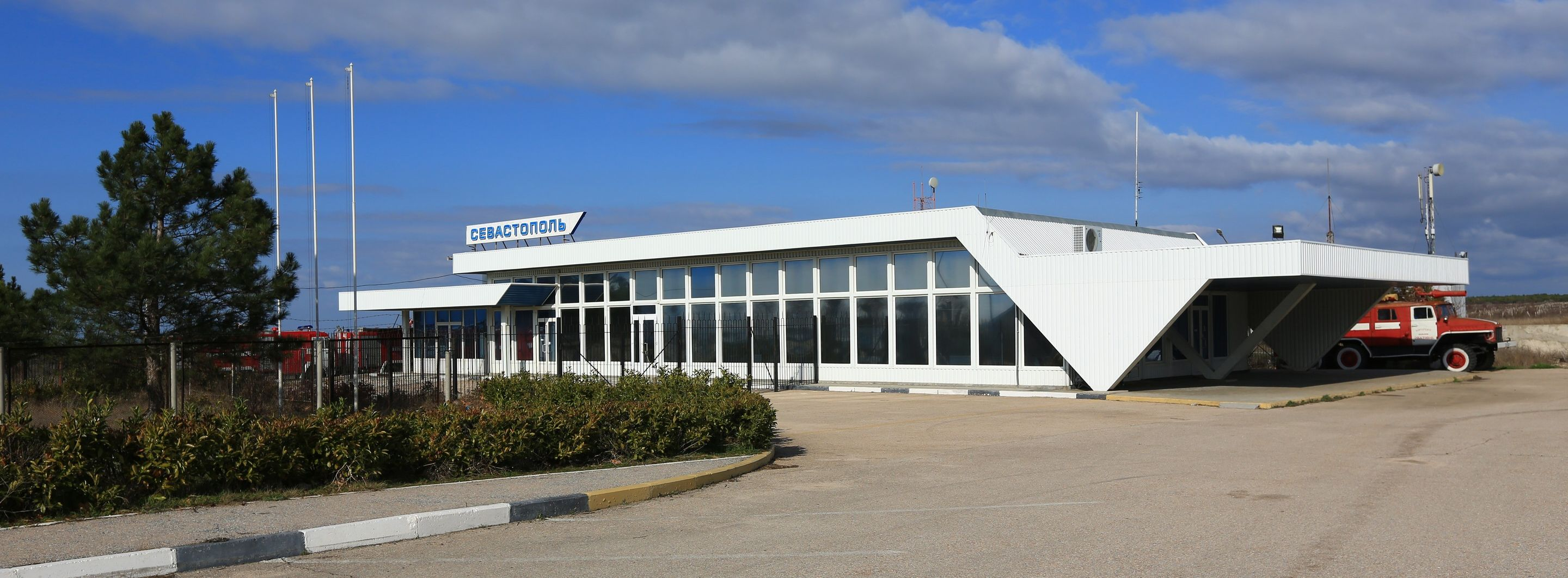
Date	28 February 2014 – 22 March 2014
Location	Sevastopol, Crimea, Ukraine
Result	Russian seizure of airport

Belligerents
Ukraine	Russia

Commanders and leaders
Oleksandr Turchynov; Ihor Tenyukh; Valentyn Nalyvaichenko; Yuliy Mamchur	Vladimir Putin; Sergei Shoigu; Vladimir Antyufeyev

Units involved
Armed Forces of Ukraine: Ukrainian Ground Forces; Ukrainian Air Force; 204th Tactical Aviation	Russian Ground Forces; GRU

Strength
~400 troops	~300-400 troops 3 armored personnel carriers 10 military "Urals"; 1 plane

During the Russian occupation of Crimea, a standoff took place at Belbek Airport near Sevastopol. The Ukrainian garrison surrendered on 22 March 2014.

== Chronology ==
Around 3:00 a.m. on 28 February, Russian military personnel in uniform without identification marks entered the territory of Belbek Airport. According to various sources, their numbers varied from 300 to 400 soldiers. The military occupying the airstrip stopped all plane movement.

According to airport shift chief Anatolii Rechenko, Czech hedgehogs and armed Russian soldiers blocked the road to the airport. There were three armored personnel carriers and 10 military "Urals" on the territory of the airfield. The Russian military also blocked the work of the state enterprise that provided air navigation over the peninsula.

According to Radio Svoboda, the airport was seized by fighters of the GRU special units of the Russian Armed Forces who arrived in Crimea from Russia. Their plane landed at the military airfield in the village of Hvardiiske.

== Course of events ==
Former head of the rear food service of the Armed Forces of Ukraine, Colonel Oleksandr Kustanovych, during the occupation of Crimea by the Russian Federation in February – March 2014, served in the tactical aviation brigade of the Armed Forces of Ukraine near Belbek Airport. He later reported that on 27 February 2014, between 9 and 10 p.m., the officer on duty at the airport received a call from the commander of our unit. He said that the movement of unknown military personnel was noticed, and 12 military vehicles and 2 armored personnel carriers were found along the perimeter of the airfield behind the fence. On 28 February, food was delivered using cars with Russian license plates.

According to him, on 29 February, the Russian military seized the airport, and the Ukrainian military units stationed there were transferred to the administrative territory of the military townlet. A few days later, the Russian military carried out an assault on the unit using military equipment. The commander of the unit was with his personnel; after the capture of the unit, the commander was taken for negotiations, but he never returned.

During the blockade of the unit, the Ukrainian military was persuaded to defect to the Russian Federation. Subsequently, the Ukrainian military unit was independently redeployed to the mainland of Ukraine.

At the time of the assault, the unit had no more than 30-40 weapons; the rest were in warehouses. The Ukrainian military did not use weapons during the assault.

The fighters had only small arms; there were no traumatic weapons or stun grenades. Around the perimeter of the military townlet were high-rise buildings where the civilian population lived.

Kustanovych said that at the time of the assault, there were about 400 military personnel in the military townlet and about the same number from the side of the stormtroopers.

The Russian military, using stun grenades, captured almost all the buildings of the Ukrainian military unit 4515 in Belbek. First, the Russians occupied the building with the service hall for the delegations; the next day, they occupied the premises with the airplanes and surrounded the guards, demanding to surrender their weapons. When they refused, they started throwing stun grenades. Next, Russian troops disarmed the Ukrainian soldiers.

On 4 March 2014, it became known that the commander refused to hand over part of the military-technical aviation, and Colonel Yuliy Mamchur decided that part of the Ukrainians with weapons remained in the garrison, and part went to the airfield.

Around 8:40 a.m., about 50 soldiers of the Ukrainian Armed Forces marched in a convoy to the airfield occupied by the Russians. When the convoy of journalists approached the entrance to the airfield, the Russians started shooting in the air, threatening to shoot the journalists in the legs.

The leader of the Russian soldiers spoke with Yuliy Mamchur. Mamchur demanded that the Ukrainian military be allowed to occupy their positions and offered to jointly guard the warehouses on the territory of the airfield.

The Russians agreed in part, allowing a technical team, about ten people, to be partially brought to the position.

On 22 March, the Russians began an assault on the military unit of the Armed Forces of Ukraine in Belbek; at 5:00 p.m., representatives of the Crimean Self-Defense Force and Russian soldiers broke into the territory. The gate to the unit was destroyed by an armored personnel carrier.

Subsequently, the Russian military abducted Mamchur, and he did not contact him for several days.

== See also ==
- Sevastopol International Airport
- Capture of the Crimean Parliament
- 2014 Simferopol incident
