= Crimea crisis =

Crimea crisis may refer to:

- Crimean War (1853–1856)
- Russian occupation of Crimea (2014–present), a part of the Russo-Ukrainian war
  - Annexation of Crimea by the Russian Federation (2014)
