= Capture of the Crimean Parliament =

Part of the Russo-Ukrainian War

Coordinates: 44.951669°N 34.096692°E

- Part of the Russo-Ukrainian War
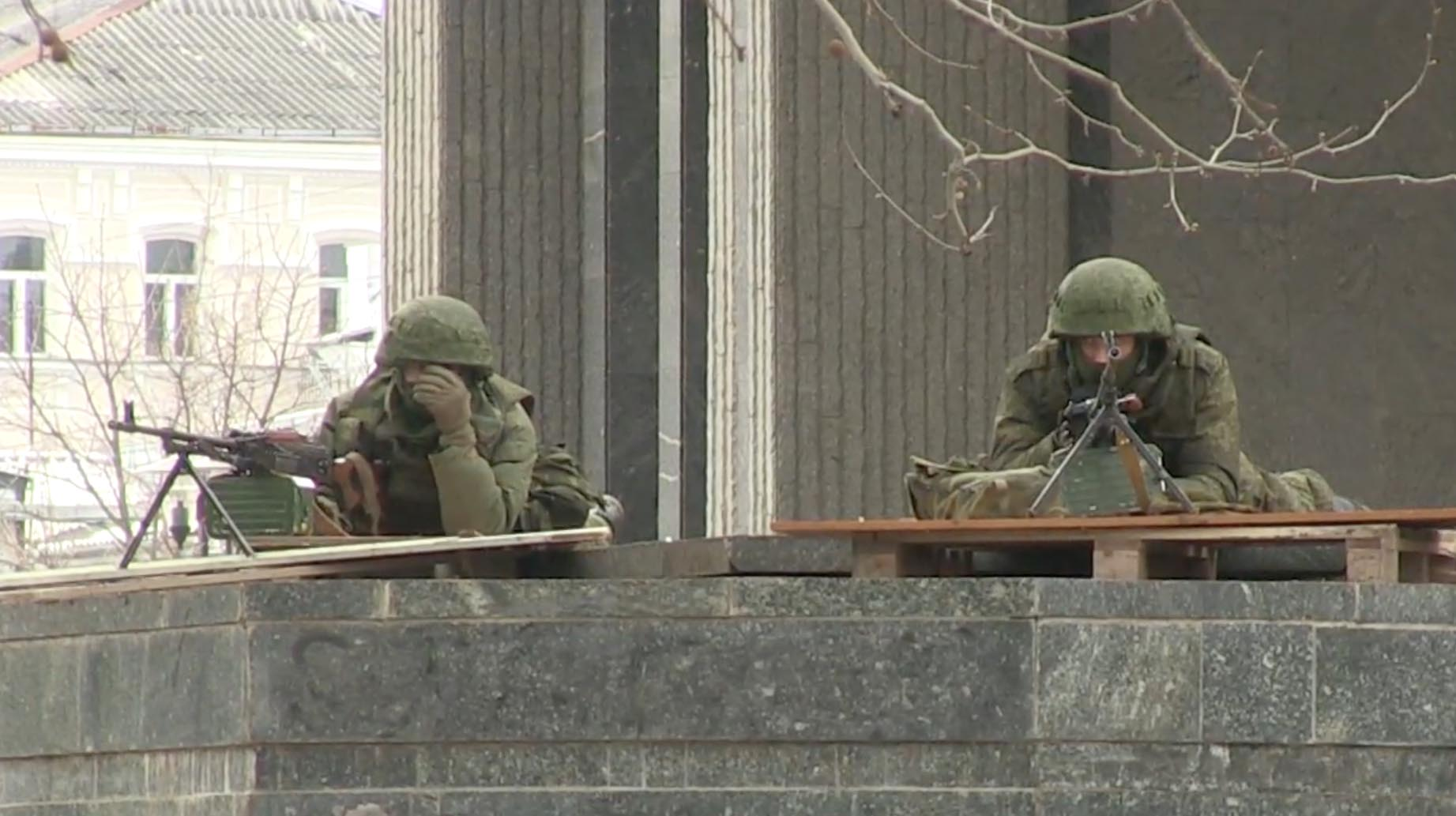
- Unmarked Russian soldiers at the Verkhovna Rada of Crimea
Date	27 February 2014
Location	Simferopol, Ukraine
Result	Russian victory: Installation of Russian politician Sergey Aksyonov as the Prime Minister of Crimea, deposing Ukrainian politician Anatolii Mohyliov from the office
Territorial changes	Annexation of Crimea by the Russian Federation on 18 March 2014

Belligerents
Russia	Ukraine

Commanders and leaders
Aleksey Dyumin; Alexander Popov	Unknown

Units involved
Special Operations Forces; Airborne Forces: 31st Guards Air Assault Brigade	Armed Forces

Strength
20–120 troops	Unknown

Casualties and losses
None	None
- Location within Crimea Location within Ukraine

On 27 February 2014, the Crimean Verkhovna Rada of Ukraine was taken over by unmarked Russian soldiers. It was among the events that triggered the Russo-Ukrainian War and laid the foundation for Crimea's annexation three weeks later. The Prosecutor's Office of Ukraine's Autonomous Republic of Crimea described the incident as a terrorist attack. A few hours into the takeover, Russia replaced the Prime Minister of Crimea, removing Ukrainian politician Anatolii Mohyliov and installing Russian politician Sergey Aksyonov in his stead.

== Background ==
In February 2014, following the Revolution of Dignity that ousted the Ukrainian President, Viktor Yanukovych, the Russian leadership decided to "start working on returning Crimea to Russia." On February 25, the Crimean Front and Cossack organizations held a pro-Russian rally outside the building of the Crimean Verkhovna Rada. Protesters shouted pro-Russian slogans and demanded separation from Ukraine by holding a referendum. Before the protesters came, the speaker of the Verkhovna Rada of the ARC, Volodymyr Konstantinov, announced the extraordinary session of February 26. The media reported that a question about the withdrawal of Crimea from Ukraine could be put to the session, but Konstantinov denied such rumors, calling it the provocation of the "Makeevka team in the Crimean government."

On February 26, two events took place in parallel by the walls of the ARC Verkhovna Rada: a pro-Ukrainian rally organized by the Mejlis of the Crimean Tatar People, which gathered up to ten thousand participants; and a pro-Russian rally of about 700 people, initiated by the "Rus unity" party. Due to unsatisfactory security measures taken by law enforcement officers, there were fights between pro-Ukrainian and pro-Russian rally participants, resulting in the death of two people from the pro-Russian rally. The pro-Russian rally was pushed to the inner court of the Crimean Verkhovna Rada and scheduled the day before parliament's session was canceled.

== Events ==
On the morning of February 27, around 4:30, two groups of 10–15 armed men in military uniform without insignia entered the building of the Verkhovna Rada of Crimea and took control of it. Immediately after the capture, the attackers were barricaded indoors, having previously removed a small number of staff. Crimean People's Deputy from the UDAR Serhiy Kunitsyn said that the building was captured by 120 highly trained personnel who had a large arsenal of weapons, including automatic weapons, machine guns, and grenade launchers, which would allow them to defend themselves for a long time. Persons who seized the building described themselves as self-defense activists for Russian-speaking citizens of Crimea, although the Mejlis leader, Refat Chubarov, said that Russian people were in charge of these people; later it became clear that the operation was orchestrated by Russian special forces.

At 8:30, the chairman of the Council of Ministers of Crimea, Anatolii Mohyliov, appealed to the inhabitants of Crimea, informing them of the capture of the Verkhovna Rada of the ARC by unknown persons numbering about 50. At 9 o'clock Anatolii Mohyliov announced talks, but they did not have any result, because, according to Mohyliov, the unknown people refused to speak.

Valentyn Nalyvaichenko, the then-head of the SBU, believed that there was no forceful capture of the ARC Verkhovna Rada, as the local Crimean authorities, including the police, voluntarily transferred control over the building and weapons.

== See also ==
- Russian occupation of Crimea
  - Capture of Belbek Airport
