= Russian occupation of Crimea =

- Military occupation
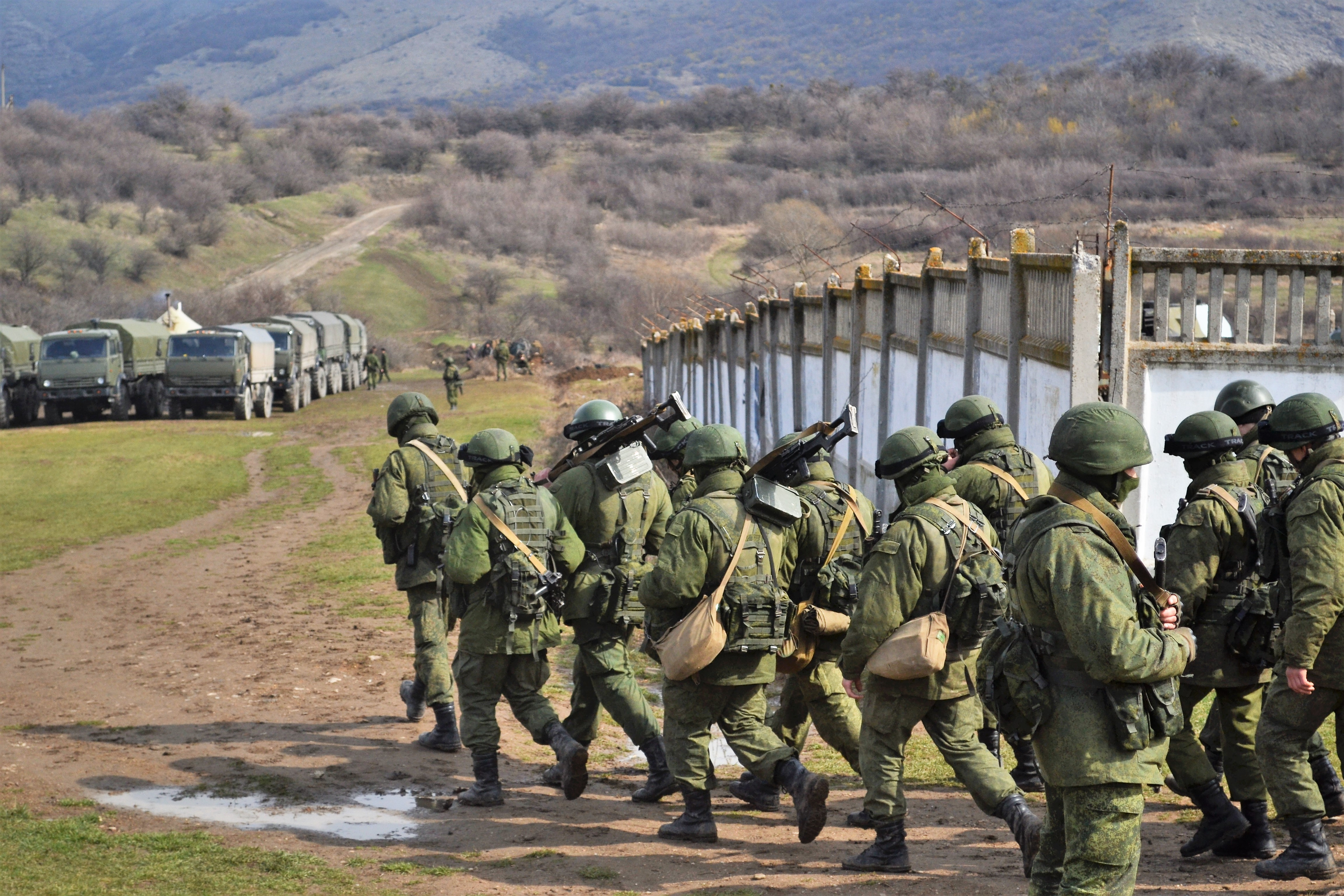

- Flag Coat of arms

- Occupied country: Ukraine
- Occupying power: Russia
- Established: 27 February 2014
- Administrative centre: Simferopol
- Largest settlement: Simferopol, Yalta

Government
  - Head: Sergey Aksyonov

Since 2014, Russia has occupied the Crimean Peninsula, a part of Ukraine. On 27 February 2014, Russia sent soldiers in unmarked uniforms to Crimea to take control of it, starting the Russo-Ukrainian war. This military occupation paved the way for the Russian annexation of Crimea on 18 March 2014. While the Russian government deems Crimea to be part of the Russian Federation, Ukraine and most of the international community see it as an occupied territory of Ukraine.

The occupation began during Ukraine's Revolution of Dignity, which ousted pro-Russian president Viktor Yanukovych. Russian special forces, disguised as "Crimean self-defense forces", took control of Crimea's government buildings, surrounded Ukrainian military bases, and blockaded the peninsula. Russia denied involvement at the time, but Putin later admitted that they were Russian troops. A pro-Russian government was installed and a referendum on Crimea's status was held under occupation. According to the Russian-installed authorities, the result was in favour of joining Russia. Russia annexed Crimea on 18 March 2014, re-organizing it as a Russian republic and turning Sevastopol into a Russian federal city. Russia also claimed an exclusive economic zone in the Black Sea around Crimea. This zone is three times bigger than the peninsula and holds vast natural gas and oil reserves. The United Nations General Assembly adopted a resolution affirming the "territorial integrity of Ukraine within its internationally recognised borders", and the UN considers Crimea to be Russian-occupied.

Since the beginning of the Russian invasion of mainland Ukraine in February 2022, Russia has used Crimea as a base from which to attack mainland Ukraine. The Ukrainian military has responded with attacks on Russian forces in Crimea. One of Russia's preconditions for ending the invasion has been the recognition of Russian claims to Crimea, while one of Ukraine's goals is to liberate the territory, by military means if necessary.

The United Nations Human Rights Office stated that Russia has committed serious human rights violations in occupied Crimea. This includes severely curbing the right to freedom of speech, assembly and religion; arbitrary arrest and detention; and forced disappearance. Ethnic Ukrainians and Crimean Tatar Muslims have suffered discrimination and repression. Residents who did not accept Russian citizenship lost their right to live and work in Crimea. Russia has also been accused of neo-colonialism by enforced Russification and by settling large numbers of Russians in Crimea and pushing out Ukrainians and Crimean Tatars.

== History ==
=== Russian planning ===
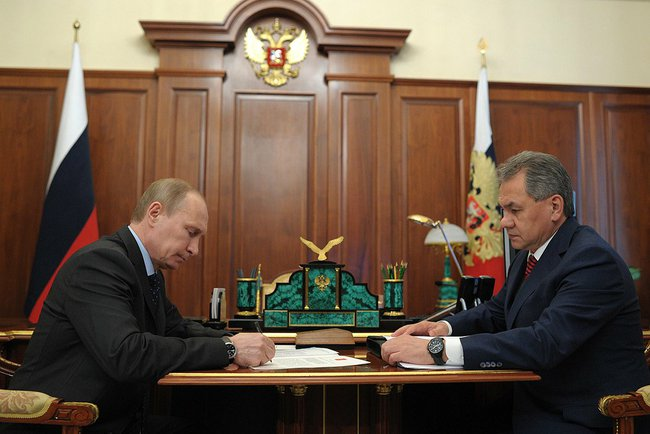
Russian President Vladimir Putin and his Defense Minister Sergei Shoigu in March 2014

In early February 2014, as the protests in Ukraine seemed likely to collapse the government, the Kremlin received a strategy paper outlining plans for the occupation and annexation of Crimea. The documents said that the Ukrainian government and president Viktor Yanukovych would not last. They proposed that Russia should foster separatism in Crimea and other eastern provinces, and should begin work on taking control of them. On 21 February 2014, Ukrainian president Yanukovych secretly fled the capital, and the next day, parliament voted to remove him from office. Russia's leadership was reportedly worried that its Sevastopol Naval Base in Crimea might be at risk under a new Ukrainian government that was committed to closer ties with the West. On 22–23 February 2014, Russian president Vladimir Putin held an all-night meeting with security chiefs to discuss the crisis. At the end of that meeting, Putin said: "we must start working on returning Crimea to Russia".

Russia took advantage of the uncertainty in Ukraine immediately after the ousting of Yanukovych. On 26 February, Putin ordered the Russian Armed Forces to be "put on alert in the Western Military District as well as units stationed with the 2nd Army Central Military District Command involved in aerospace defence, airborne troops and long-range military transport". Russian Defence Minister Sergei Shoigu denied that this was related to events in Ukraine.

=== Russian military takeover ===
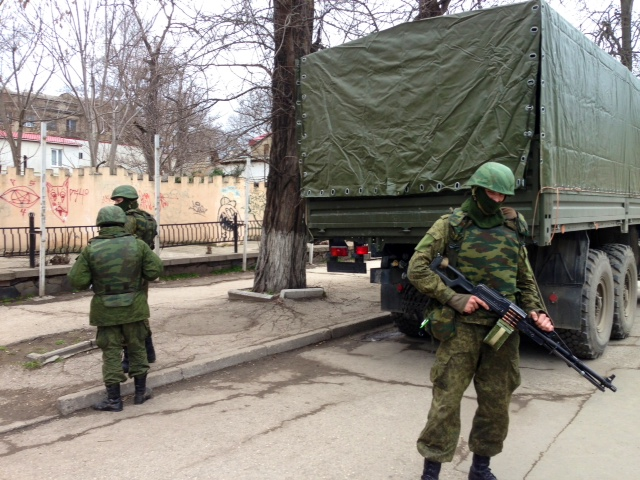
Russian soldiers without markings in Simferopol, Crimea, 2 March 2014

Early on 27 February 2014, Russian special forces began to occupy Crimea, wearing unmarked uniforms to hide their origin. They were referred to as "little green men". The soldiers had set out from the Russian base in Sevastopol and travelled to the capital Simferopol. There, they seized the Crimean parliament building and the Council of Ministers building. Russian flags were raised over them and barricades were erected. A military checkpoint, with a Russian flag and Russian military vehicles, was set up on the main highway between Sevastopol and Simferopol.

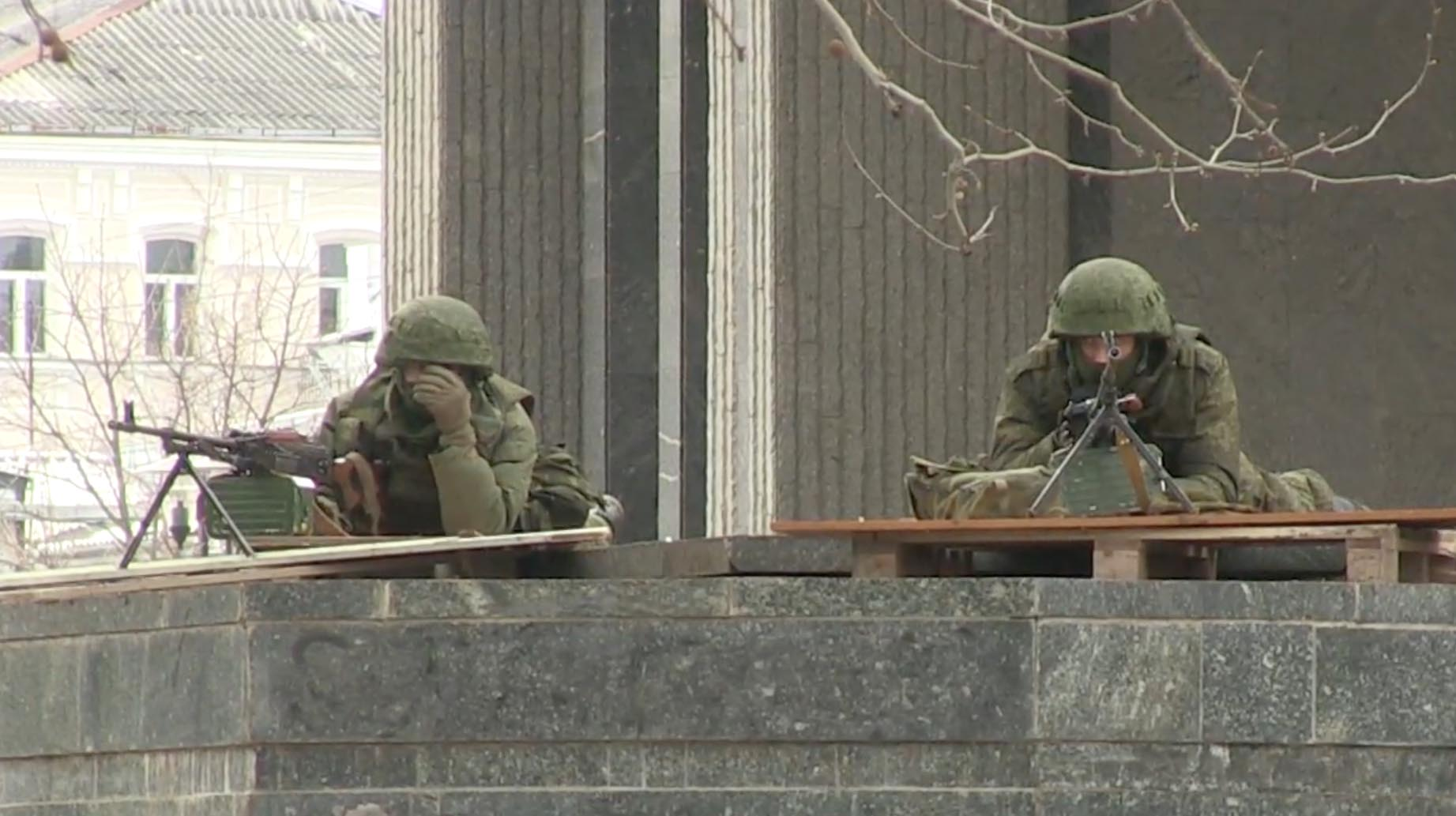
Russian soldiers without markings occupying the Crimean parliament building, 1 March 2014

Hours after the takeover began, the Crimean parliament held an emergency session while the armed men occupied the building. It voted to dismiss the Crimean government, and replace Prime Minister Anatolii Mohyliov with Sergey Aksyonov; a member of the Russian Unity party, which received only 4% of votes in the last election. Under the Constitution of Ukraine, the prime minister of Crimea is appointed by the Crimean parliament (Supreme Council of Crimea) in consultation with the president of Ukraine. Both Aksyonov and speaker Vladimir Konstantinov stated that they viewed Viktor Yanukovych as the de jure president of Ukraine. The parliament also voted to hold a referendum on Crimea's political status, set for 25 May. Historian Andrew Wilson and journalist Luke Harding called this the "Crimean coup".

The troops had cut all of the building's communications, and took MPs' phones as they entered. No independent journalists were allowed inside the building while the votes were held. Some MPs said they were threatened and that votes were cast for them and other MPs, even though they were not in the chamber. Interfax-Ukraine reported that there was no way to know how many MPs were present, and whether they voted themselves or if someone else used their voting cards. The head of parliament's information department, Olha Sulnikova, phoned journalists from inside the building, telling them 61 of the registered 64 deputies had voted for the referendum resolution and 55 for the resolution to dismiss the government. These votes were immediately declared illegal by the Ukrainian interim government.

Russian FSB colonel Igor Girkin (alias 'Strelkov'), one of the commanders of the soldiers, said in January 2015 that Crimean MPs were held at gunpoint and forced to vote in favor. Girkin said:

"Unfortunately I did not see any support from the [Crimean] authorities in Simferopol where I was ... It was militants who collected deputies and forced them to vote. Yes, I was one of the commanders of those militants. I saw that from the inside".

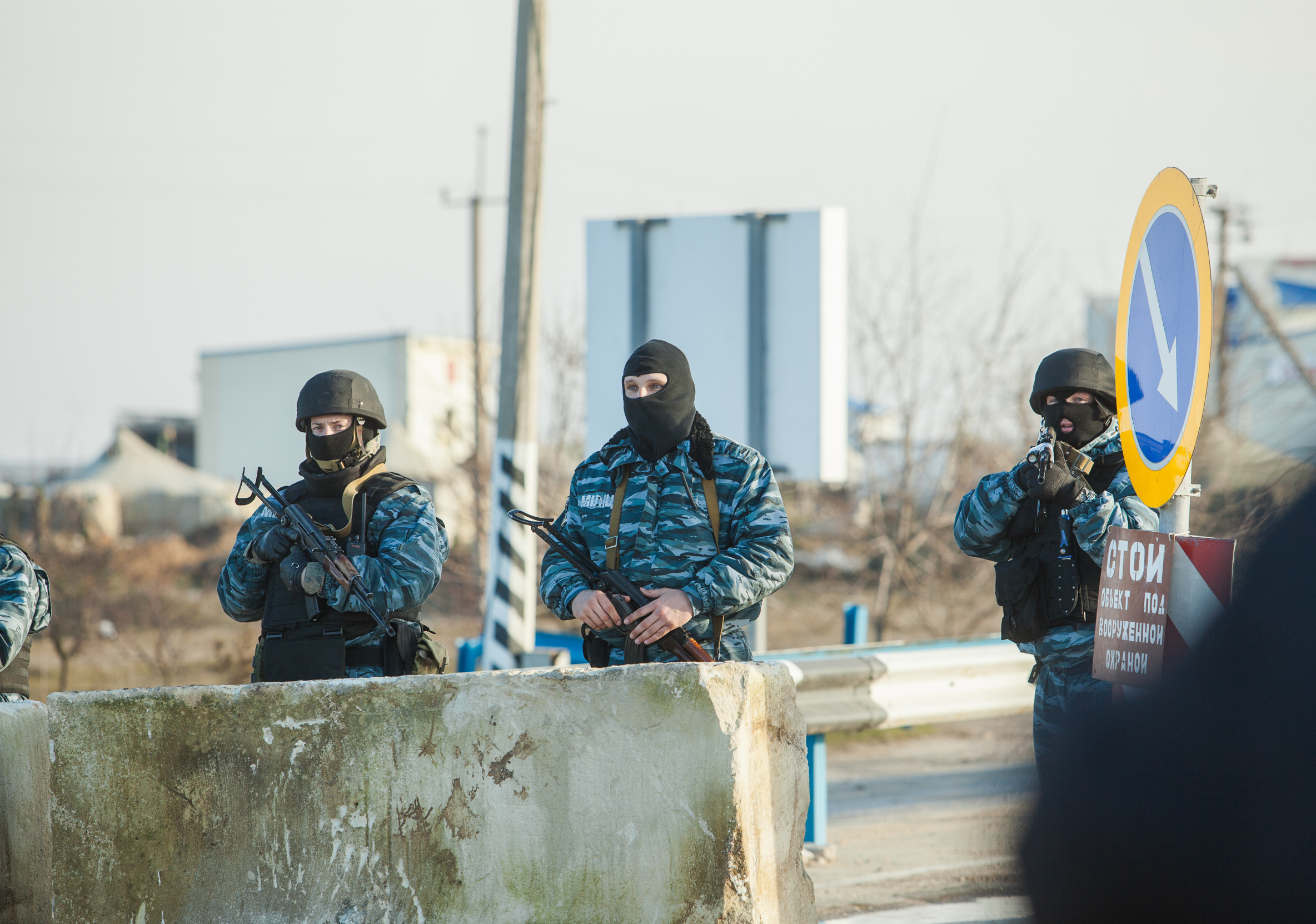
Armed men in Berkut uniform guarding a checkpoint at Chonhar, on the border of mainland Ukraine and Crimea, 10 March 2014

The same day, more unmarked troops set up security checkpoints on the Isthmus of Perekop and the Chonhar Peninsula, which separate Crimea from the Ukrainian mainland. They were helped by what appeared to be local Berkut riot police, as well as Russian troops from the 31st Separate Airborne Assault Brigade dressed in Berkut uniforms. Within hours, Ukraine had been cut off from Crimea. Ukrainian TV channels became unavailable for Crimean viewers, some replaced with Russian stations. On 29 February, unmarked Russian special forces occupied Crimea's airports and communications centers.

On 1 March 2014, Aksyonov said that he would exercise control of all Ukrainian military and security installations on the peninsula. He also asked Putin for "assistance in ensuring peace and tranquillity" in Crimea. Putin promptly received authorisation from the Federation Council of Russia for a Russian military intervention in Ukraine until the "political-social situation in the country is normalized". Ukraine's prime minister, Arseniy Yatsenyuk, said that Russian military intervention would be the beginning of war.

An emergency meeting of the UN Security Council was held on 2 March 2014 to discuss the crisis. Ukrainian ambassador Yuriy Sergeyev said that Russia was committing "an act of aggression against the state of Ukraine". He stated that Russia had broken the Budapest agreement and called on the other signatories to provide the assistance they had agreed to. Russian ambassador Vitaly Churkin accused the US and EU of "encouraging" the protests that had led to the ousting of Ukrainian president Yanukovych. He denied that Russian forces had invaded Crimea. US Ambassador Samantha Power told the session that Russia had violated Ukraine's sovereignty and called for the "immediate deployment" international monitors from the UN and the Organization for the Security and Cooperation in Europe (OSCE).

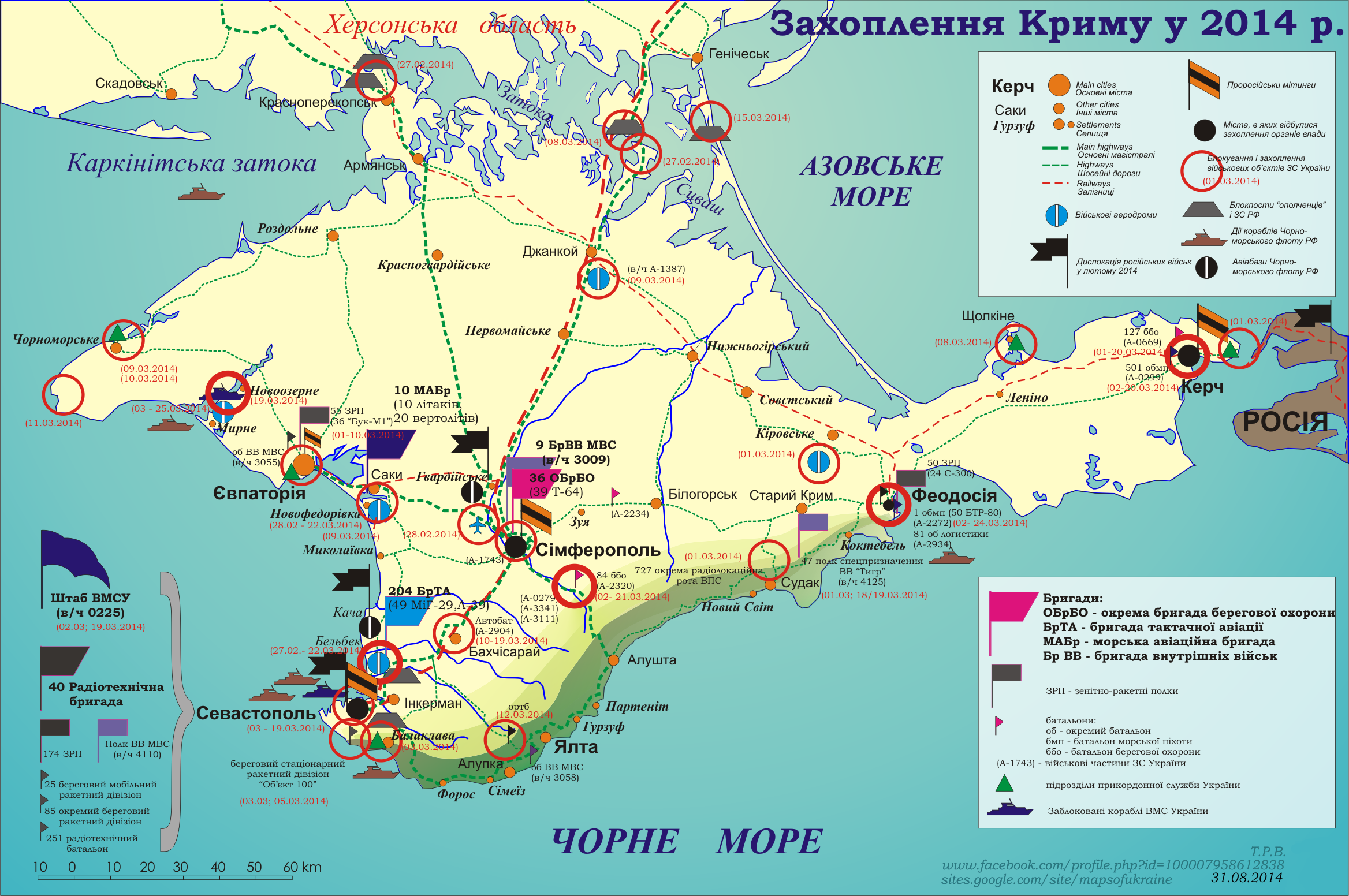
The blockade of military units of the Armed Forces of Ukraine during the capture of Crimea by Russia in February–March 2014

By 2 March, Russian troops were in full control of Crimea, having deployed from the naval base in Sevastopol and reinforced by troops, armour, and helicopters from mainland Russia. On 3 March they blockaded the Southern Naval Base.

On 4 March, the Ukrainian General Staff said there were Russian units of the 18th Motor Rifle Brigade, 31st Air Assault Brigade and 22nd Spetsnaz Brigade deployed and operating in Crimea, not only Russian Black Sea Fleet personnel, which violated international agreements signed by Ukraine and Russia.

At a press conference on 4 March, president Putin said that Russia had no plans to annex Crimea. He also said that it had no plans to invade Ukraine, but that it might intervene if Russians in Ukraine were threatened. This was part of a pattern of public denials of the ongoing Russian military operation.

Numerous media reports and statements by the Ukrainian and foreign governments noted the identity of the unmarked troops as Russian soldiers, but Russian officials concealed the identity of their forces, claiming they were local "self-defence" units over whom they had no authority. As late as 17 April, Russian foreign minister Sergey Lavrov said that there were no "excessive Russian troops" in Ukraine. At the same press conference, Putin said of the peninsula that "only citizens themselves, in conditions of free expression of will and their security can determine their future". Putin later acknowledged that he had ordered "work to bring Crimea back into Russia" as early as February. He also acknowledged that in early March there were "secret opinion polls" held in Crimea, which, according to him, reported overwhelming popular support for Crimea's incorporation into Russia.

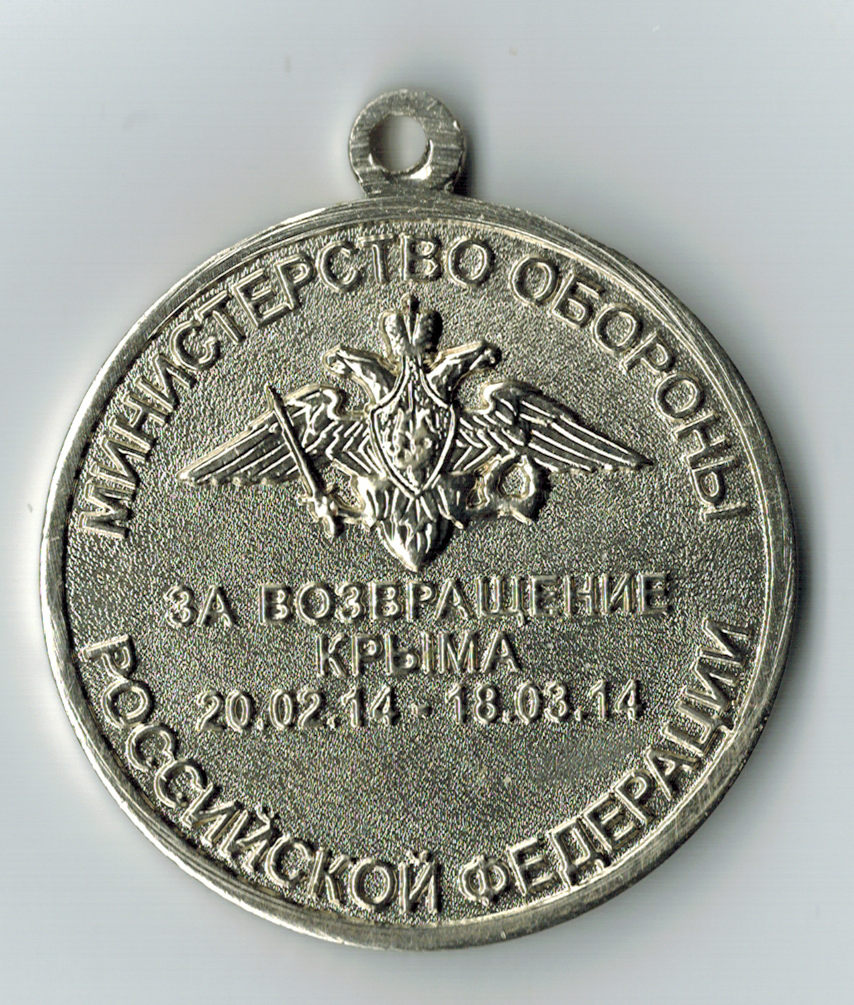
Medal of the Russian Defense Ministry "For the return of Crimea" (Russian: За возвращение Крыма), 20 February – 18 March 2014

Russia eventually admitted its troops' presence. Defence Minister Sergei Shoigu said the country's military actions in Crimea were undertaken by forces of the Black Sea Fleet and were justified by "threat to lives of Crimean civilians" and danger of "takeover of Russian military infrastructure by extremists". Ukraine complained that by increasing its troop presence in Crimea, Russia violated the agreement under which it headquartered its Black Sea Fleet in Sevastopol and violated the country's sovereignty. The United States and United Kingdom accused Russia of breaking the terms of the Budapest Memorandum on Security Assurances, by which Russia, the US, and the UK had reaffirmed their obligation to refrain from the threat or use of force against the territorial integrity or political independence of Ukraine. The Russian government said the Budapest Memorandum did not apply due to "circumstances resulting from the action of internal political or socio-economic factors". In March 2015, retired Russian Admiral Igor Kasatonov stated that according to his information the Russian troop deployment in Crimea included six helicopter landings and three landings of an IL-76 with 500 people.

=== Annexation ===
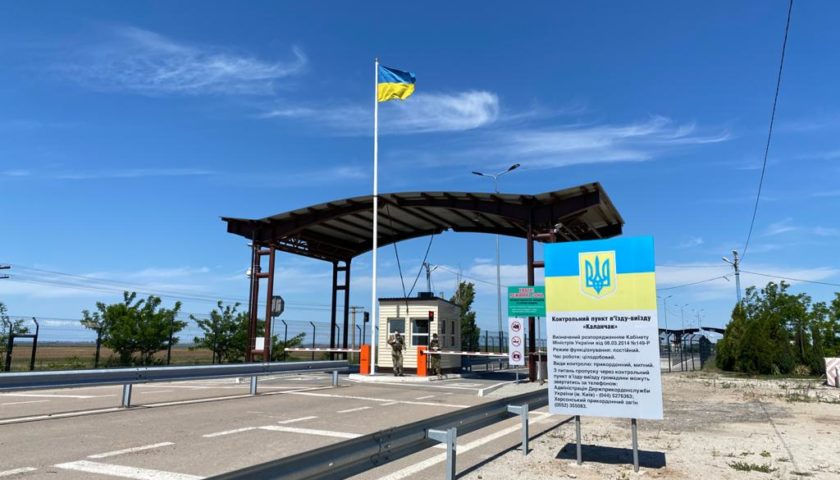
Ukrainian checkpoint at Kalanchak, entering Kherson Oblast from Russian-occupied Crimea.

On 16 March 2014, a referendum status of Crimea was held by Russia, where, according to official Russian data, 96.77% of the inhabitants of the (Autonomous) Republic of Crimea and the city of Sevastopol voted for the reunification of the respective territories with the Russian Federation. On 17 March, the Verkhovna Rada of the Autonomous Republic of Crimea proclaimed the independence of the Republic of Crimea, and on 18 March, in the Georgievsky Hall of the Kremlin, President of Russia Vladimir Putin, together with the self-proclaimed Chairman of the Council of Ministers of the Autonomous Republic of Crimea Sergey Aksyonov, the Speaker of the Verkhovna Rada of the Autonomous Republic of Crimea Vladimir Konstantinov and the self-proclaimed life of Sevastopol Aleksei Chalyi, signed the Treaty on the Adoption of the Republic Crimea to Russia. On 21 March, the Federation Council adopted a law on the ratification of the Treaty of 18 March and a law on the formation of new subjects of the federation — the Republic of Crimea and the federal city of Sevastopol, securing the annexation of these regions by Russia.

On 27 March 2014, the United Nations General Assembly supported the territorial integrity of Ukraine, recognizing Autonomous Republic of Crimea and Sevastopol as its integral parts. 100 UN member states out of 194 voted for the relevant resolution. Only 11 countries voted against (Armenia, Belarus, Bolivia, Cuba, Nicaragua, North Korea, Russia, Sudan, Syria, Venezuela and Zimbabwe), 58 abstained. The forced annexation of Crimea is not recognized by Ukraine, is not recognized by the UN General Assembly, PACE, OSCE PA, and also contradicts the decision of the Venice Commission, while the Russian authorities interpret it as "the return of Crimea to Russia." According to the Law of Ukraine "On Ensuring the Rights and Freedoms of Citizens and the Legal Regime in the Temporarily Occupied Territory of Ukraine", the territory of the Crimean Peninsula is considered temporarily occupied territory as a result of Russian occupation.

=== 2014–2021 ===
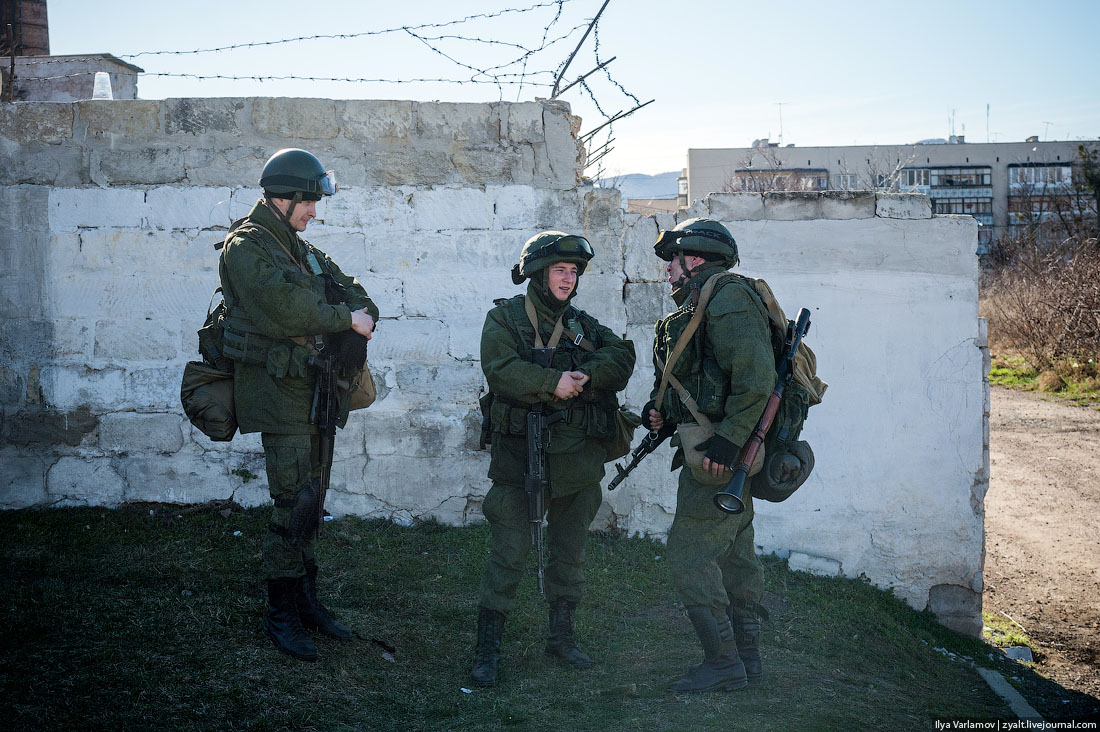
Russian troops in Crimea, March 2014

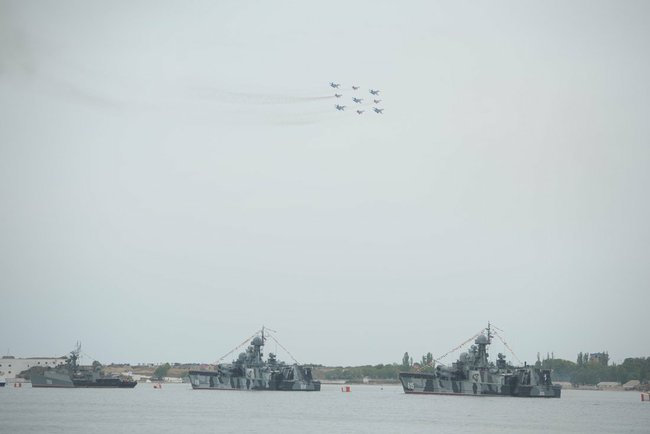
Russian forces during Victory Day in Sevastopol, 2014

On 21 November 2015, segments of the four electricity transmission lines in Ukraine supplying electricity to Crimea were destroyed by Ukrainian activists, causing about 1.6 million people and 150 schools in Crimea to be without power and water supplies to some high buildings to fail. Ukrinterenergo repaired the lines a few days later, as Russia was considering stopping supplies of coal to Ukraine in response.

On 8 August 2016, Ukraine reported that Russia had increased its military presence along the demarcation line. In response to this military buildup Ukraine also deployed more troops and resources closer to the border with Crimea. The Pentagon has downplayed a Russian invasion of Ukraine, calling Russian troops along the border a regular military exercise. On 10 August, Russia claimed two servicemen were killed in clashes with Ukrainian commandos, and that Ukrainian servicemen had been captured with a total of 40 kg of explosives in their possession. Ukraine denied that the incident took place.

Russian accounts claimed that Russian FSB detained "Ukrainian saboteurs" and "terrorists" near Armiansk. The ensuing gunfight left one FSB officer and a suspect dead. A number of individuals were detained, including Yevhen Panov, who is described by Russian sources as a Ukrainian military intelligence officer and leader of the sabotage group. The group was allegedly planning terror attacks on important infrastructure in Armiansk, Crimea. Ukrainian media reported that Panov was a military volunteer fighting in the east of the country, however he has more recently been associated with a charitable organization. Russia also claimed that the alleged border infiltration was accompanied by "heavy fire" from Ukrainian territory, resulting in the death of a Russian soldier. The Ukrainian government called the Russian accusations "cynical" and "senseless" and argued that since Crimea was Ukrainian territory, it was Russia which "has been generously financing and actively supporting terrorism on Ukrainian territory".

On 28 December 2018, Russia completed a high-tech security fence marking the de facto border between Crimea and Ukraine.

==== Kerch Strait incident ====
On 25 November 2018, three ships of the Ukrainian Navy – two small armored artillery boats, Berdyansk and Nikopol, and the tug Yany Kapu – carried out a planned transition from the port of Odesa on the Black Sea to the port of Mariupol on the Sea of Azov. The Ukrainian side informed in advance about the route in accordance with international standards to ensure the safety of navigation. In the area of the Kerch Strait, they were stopped by a Russian tanker, which blocked the passage under the Crimean Bridge built by the occupying authorities. Contrary to the UN Convention on the Law of the Sea and the Treaty between Ukraine and the Russian Federation on Cooperation in the Use of the Sea of Azov and the Kerch Strait, the border ships of the Russian Federation (patrol border boats of the Sobol type, the Don PSKR, the Mongoose type boats, the Suzdalets MPK) committed aggressive actions against the ships of the Navy of the Armed Forces of Ukraine. The border ship "Don" rammed the Ukrainian tug, as a result of which the ship's main engine, plating and railing were damaged, and a life raft was lost. Dispatching service refused to ensure the right of freedom of navigation, guaranteed by international agreements. The Russians captured the three Ukrainian ships and 24 sailors, 6 of whom were wounded. In Ukraine, on the same day, an urgent meeting of the National Security and Defense Council was convened to discuss the introduction of martial law. The next day, 26 November, they approved the decision to introduce martial law for 30 days.

=== 2022 Russian invasion of Ukraine ===
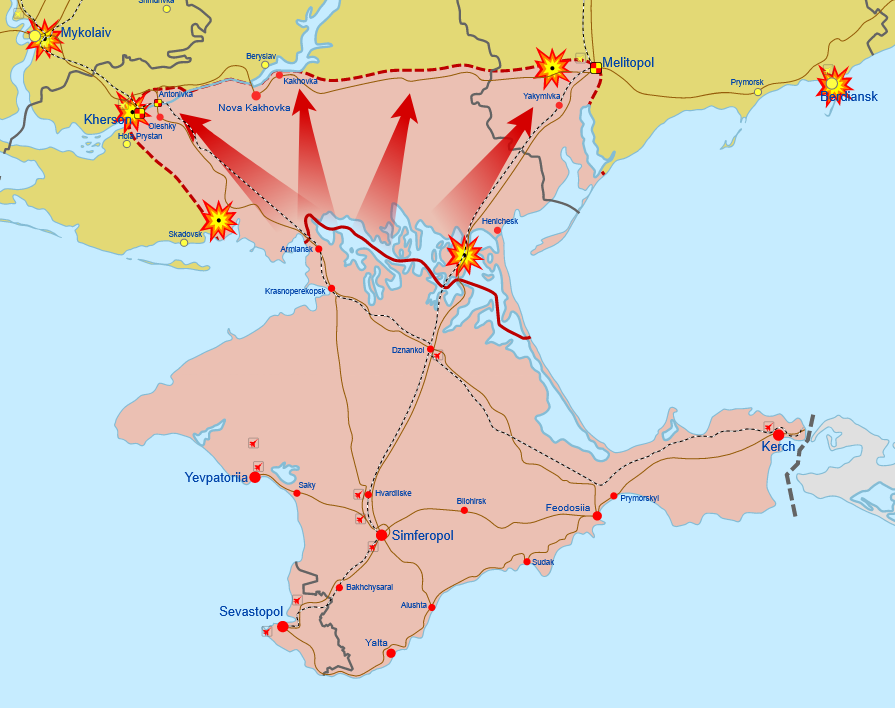
Movement of Russian forces out of Crimea during the outbreak of the 2022 invasion

Shortly before the start of negotiations, Vladimir Putin's press secretary Dmitry Peskov, in an interview with Reuters, outlined the main requirements for Ukraine, one of which was the recognition of Crimea as Russian. President of Ukraine Volodymyr Zelenskyy said on the air of the ABC TV channel that he was ready to discuss the issues of Crimea and Donbas, but as part of Ukraine.

On 29 March 2022, the head of the Ukrainian delegation, Mykhailo Podoliak, proposed to negotiate the status of Crimea and Sevastopol for 15 years. At the same time, both Moscow and Kyiv should refrain from resolving this issue by military means throughout this period. Vladimir Medinsky, in turn, said that this does not correspond to the Russian position. According to the statements of Mykhailo Podoliak and David Arakhamia after the negotiations, Ukraine proposed to freeze the issue of the status of Crimea for 15 years, proposed the conclusion of an international treaty on security guarantees, which would be signed and ratified by all countries acting as guarantors of Ukraine's security. But the negotiation process was suspended in May 2022.

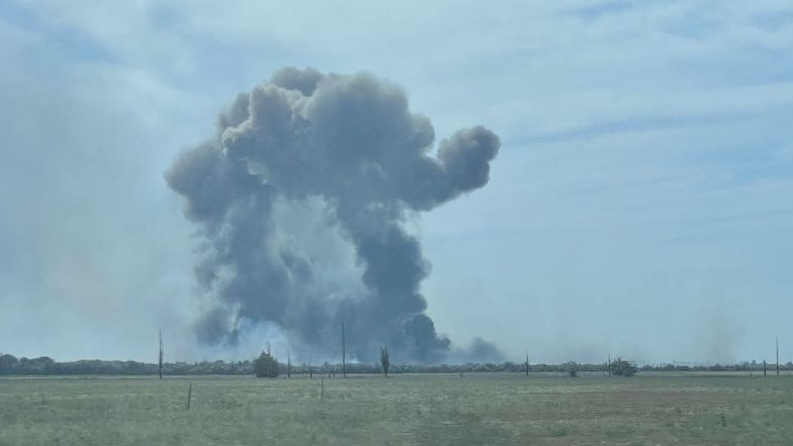
Aerodrome Saky, August 2022

On 9 August 2022, explosions occurred at the Saky military airfield in Crimea. As a result of a fire and explosions at the airfield used as the main air force base of the Russian Black Sea Fleet, from 7 to 11 Su-24 and Su-30SM aircraft were destroyed. On 7 September 2022, the Commander-in-Chief of the Armed Forces of Ukraine Valerii Zaluzhnyi announced that it had launched a missile attack on the airfield.

On 23 August 2022, due to the full-scale invasion of Ukraine by the Russian Federation, the second summit of the Crimea Platform was held online. The event was attended by more than 60 participants – leaders of countries and international organizations. They made statements in support of Ukraine.

On 29 August 2022, President of Ukraine Volodymyr Zelenskyy said that the Russian-Ukrainian war would end exactly where it began in 2014 – with the entry of Ukrainian troops to the state border in 1991, the liberation of the previously occupied territories of Ukraine, including Donbas and Crimea from the Russians.

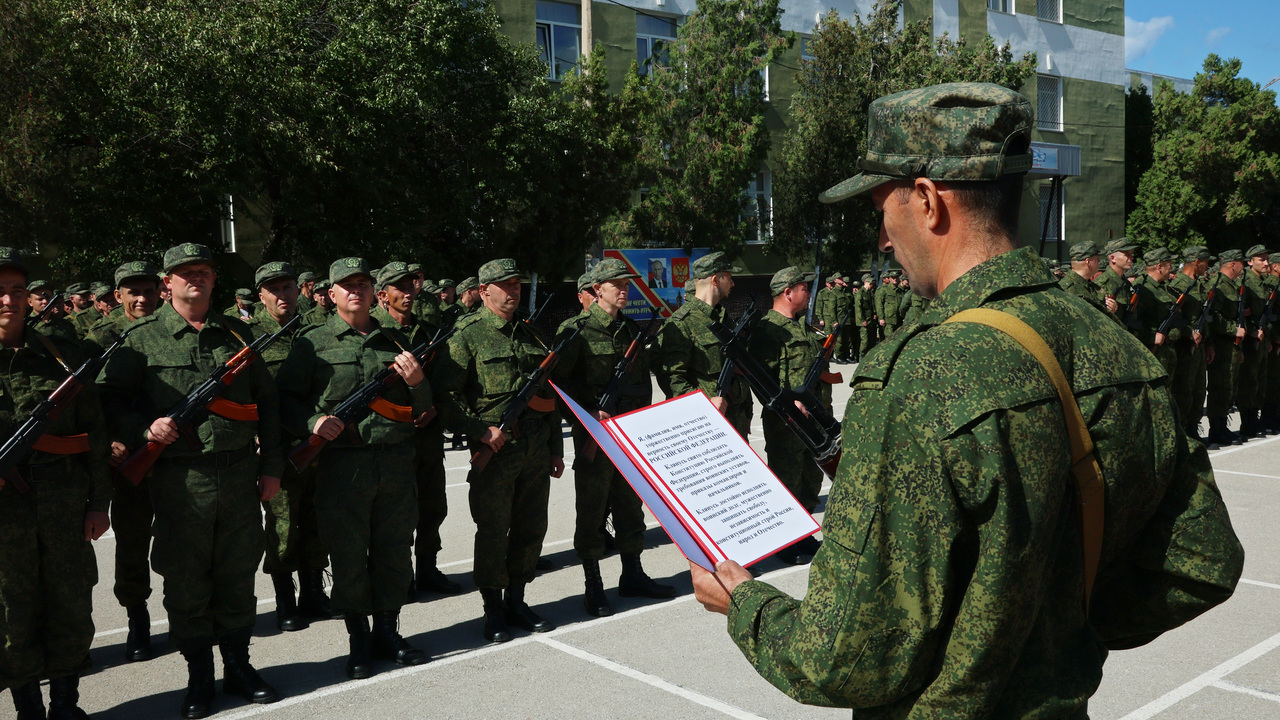
Citizens of occupied Crimea being mobilized to fight in Ukraine, September 2022

On 28 September 2022, the commander of the US Army in Europe, retired Lieutenant General Ben Hodges, is convinced that the Armed Forces of Ukraine will be able to push the Russian military back to their positions on 23 February by the end of this year, and by mid-2023 the Defense Forces can enter the temporarily occupied Autonomous Republic of Crimea. On 30 September 2022, the head of the Main Directorate of Intelligence of the Ministry of Defense, Kyrylo Budanov, stated that "Ukraine will return to the occupied Crimea – this will happen with weapons and pretty soon. The liberation of Crimea will not take place in the summer, but before the end of spring, perhaps a little earlier."

On 6 October 2022, the administration of President of the United States Joe Biden assessed the likelihood of the liberation of Crimea by the Ukrainian military, noting that de-occupation for Ukraine is already quite possible. That is why such a scenario of events can no longer be discounted. The official emphasized that the pace of advancement of the Ukrainian military in the Kherson Oblast gives hope for the liberation of the peninsula temporarily occupied by Russia.

On 8 October, a fire broke out on the Crimean Bridge in Kerch, the occupation authorities of the peninsula accused Ukraine of undermining the crossing. The Ukrainian government's official Twitter account tweeted "sick burn" in response to the fire, while Mykhailo Podoliak, a Ukrainian presidential advisor, called the damage a "beginning". The Ministry of Defense of Ukraine compared the destruction of the Crimean Bridge to the destruction of the cruiser Moskva: "What's next, Russkies?". The Russian authorities in the Crimea accused the Ukrainian side for what happened.

Mikhail Razvozhayev, the head of annexed Sevastopol, said that on the morning of 29 October 2022, the Ukrainian military attacked ships of the Black Sea Fleet of the Russian Federation and civilian vessels. According to him, it was the most massive drone attack in the entire history of the war, and the ships are damaged. The Russian Ministry of Defense accused the Royal Navy of preparing an attack on Sevastopol, which is allegedly located in Ochakiv of Mykolaiv Oblast. Both Ukraine and Britain have rejected Russian allegations, with the United Kingdom saying Russia is "peddling false claims of an epic scale." On the same day, Russia announced that it was suspending participation in the implementation of the grain agreement allegedly because of the "terrorist attack" in the Sevastopol Bay.

After the return of control by the government of Ukraine to the right-bank Kherson, Mykolaiv Oblasts and the city of Kherson in November 2022, the Financial Times published an article based on the head of the Ukrainian Centre for Security and Cooperation, Serhii Kuzan, in which it was noted that the return of the city of Kherson would allow the Armed Forces of Ukraine to keep under fire control three important roads, in particular to Crimea, from where the Russians supply equipment and ammunition. A little earlier, in November 2022, a lawyer and former military man who served in the Balkans, Iraq and Afghanistan, Frank Ledwidge, told The Guardian that in September, Ukraine's commander- in-chief, General Valeriy Zaluzhnyi, said that he saw Russia's "centre of gravity" – the key to the war – as Crimea. All military indicators strongly suggest that Ukraine's next offensives will set the peninsula as their objective.

On 3 December 2022, it became known that the Russians brought packaging material to the central museums of occupied Crimea and began preparing collections and exhibits for export to the Russian Federation.

On 19 January 2023, during the Ukrainian breakfast in Davos, Volodymyr Zelenskyy stated that the goal of Ukraine is to de-occupy all territories temporarily seized by Russia and called on the Western world to provide heavy weapons for this.

On 7 and 9 June 2026 Ukraine attacked the Chonhar Bridge and on 11 June 2026, Ukraine struck Cape Fiolent, Komyshov Bay, Kozacha Bay, Sevastopol, Striletska Bay, and bridges at Armiansk and Krasnoperekopsk.

== Resistance to occupation ==
During the early stages of the occupation, cities like Simferopol, Yalta and Sevastopol became the scene of pro-Ukrainian protests of different sizes, most notably a mass protest on 26 February 2014, where tensions arose between approximately 10,000 pro-Ukrainian protesters and a crowd of roughly 5,000 pro-Russian demonstrators in front of the regional administration building in Simferopol.

Between 2014 and 2017, the peninsula became the scene of a low-intensity insurgency, during which pro-Ukrainian partisans mainly committed sabotage and arson attacks against infrastructure targets, but also acts of psychological warfare, as well as attacks on Russian security forces.

During Russia's full-scale invasion of Ukraine, militant pro-Ukrainian partisan movements started to organize in Russian-occupied Eastern and Southern Ukraine. Since then, Crimean partisan cells have been involved in acts of sabotage, arson, assassinations, vandalism and psychological warfare on the territory of the whole peninsula, with the far north, the Southern Coast and the Simferopol-Bakhchysarai metropolitan area being ″hotspots″ of their activity.

== Discrimination against Ukrainians and Crimean Tatars ==
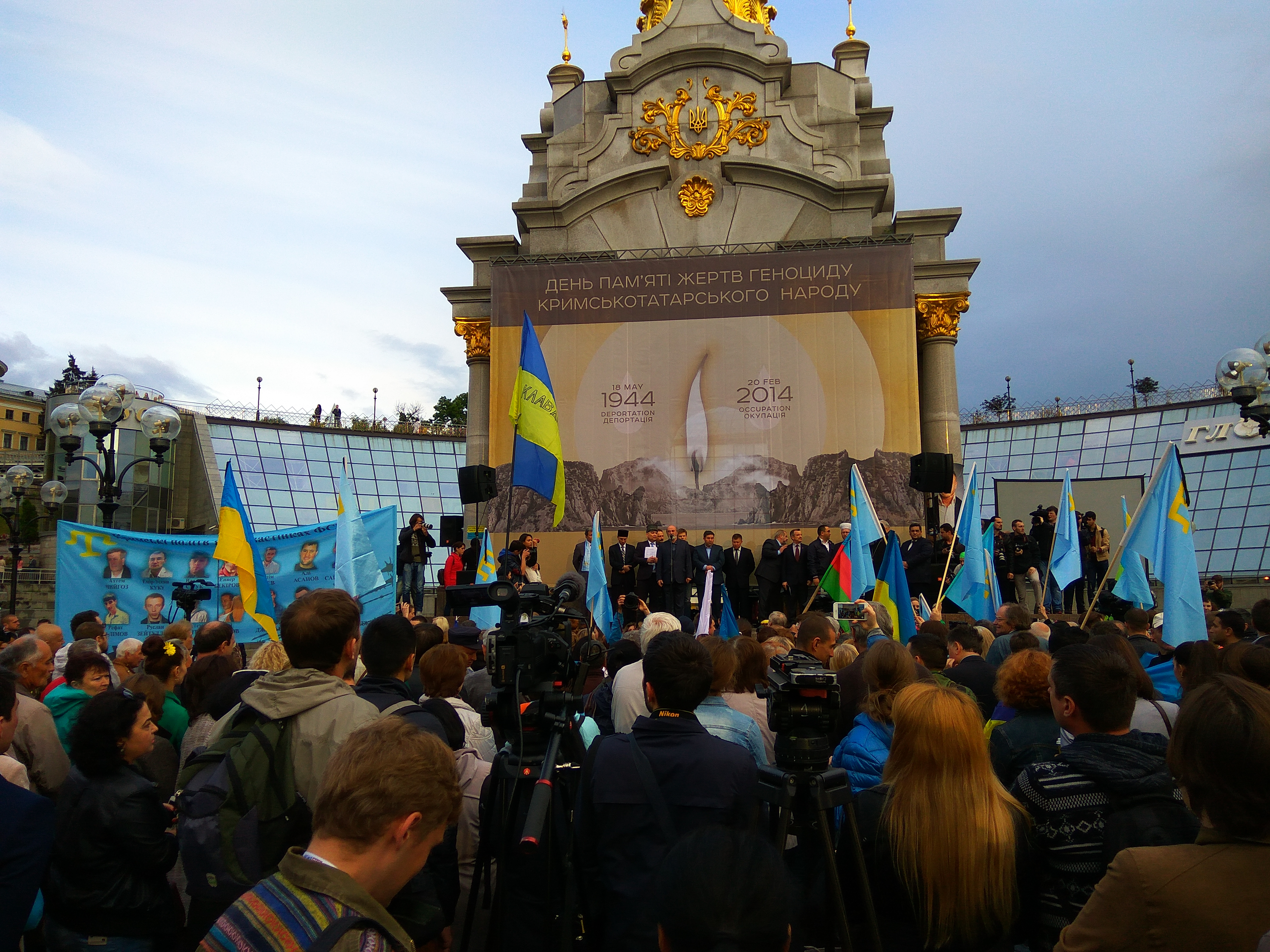
A commemoration event in Kyiv, likening the Deportation of the Crimean Tatars in 1944 to the Russian occupation of Crimea since 2014

United Nations special rapporteurs have condemned the Russian occupation authorities for attempting "to erase local [Ukrainian] culture, history, and language" and to forcibly replace it with Russian language and culture. Ukrainian monuments and places of worship have been razed, while Ukrainian history books and literature deemed to be "extremist" have been seized from public libraries and destroyed. Civil servants and teachers have been detained for their refusal to implement Russian policy. The International Court of Justice in ruled in 2024 that steep and systematic decline in providing education in Ukrainian language in occupied Crimea was artificially enforced by the Russian Federation with intent to harm Ukrainian ethnicity in the region, thus breaking the Convention on the Elimination of Racial Discrimination by restricting Ukrainian-language school classes. Russia has been accused of neocolonialism and colonization in Crimea by enforced Russification, passportization, and by settling Russian citizens on the peninsula and forcing out Ukrainians and Crimean Tatars.

In the fall of 2014, the Russian authorities conducted a population census in the occupied Crimea, according to which there were 344,500 Ukrainians on the peninsula (15.7%), and the native language was Ukrainian for only 3.3% of the Crimean population. According to sociologist Iryna Bekeshkina, this reduction in the number of Ukrainians was due to the change in identification of part of the Ukrainian population from Ukrainians to Russians. After the occupation, many ethnic Ukrainians and Crimean Tatars began to leave Crimea for mainland Ukraine. As of 15 August 2019, 40,733 displaced people from the occupied peninsula were officially registered on the mainland of Ukraine. According to activists of the Crimean Tatar movement, several hundreds of thousands of Russians moved to Crimea with the assistance of the Russian authorities during the 4 years of occupation. All this creates grounds for further fundamental changes in the ethnic structure of the peninsula.

After the occupation of Crimea, Ukrainians became one of the ethnic communities of the peninsula most discriminated against by the occupying Russian authorities. The occupying power persecutes Ukrainian public figures, carries out anti-Ukrainian propaganda, makes xenophobic and chauvinist statements, persecutes Ukrainian religious communities, bans the activities of Ukrainian public and political organizations, restricts the use of the Ukrainian language and Ukrainian national symbols. Thus, as early as the first half of 2014, Ukrainian-language signs were replaced with Russian ones, in April 2014, the monument to Petro Sahaydachny and a commemorative sign in honor of the 10th anniversary of the Ukrainian Navy were dismantled in Sevastopol, in August 2014, it was announced that 250 Ukrainian language and literature teachers would be retrained in Russian, in September 2014, the Faculty of Ukrainian Language was liquidated at the Tavri University (a department of Ukrainian philology was created instead), in November 2014, the Crimean Academic Ukrainian Musical Theater was renamed the State Academic Musical Theater of the Republic of Crimea, and the only Ukrainian school-gymnasium in Simferopol was transferred to the Russian language of instruction and renamed to Simferopol Academic Gymnasium, in December 2014, the Ukrainian children's theater studio "Svitanok" closed due to pressure, in March 2016, the Lesia Ukrainka Museum in Yalta was closed for renovation, in the same month, the Russian FSB searched the premises of the Ukrainian society "Prosvita" in Sevastopol, where they seized more than 250 "extremist materials". The power structures of the occupation authorities detained a number of Ukrainian figures, in particular, Andriy Shchekun, Anatoliy Kovalskyi and others, some of the detainees were tortured. The Russian military seized most of the churches of the Orthodox Church of Ukraine —as of October 2018, 38 out of 46 Ukrainian parishes in Crimea stopped working. As of June 2019, only one OCU church remained in operation, but it was also looted by a court decision under the guise of repairs. According to Archbishop of Simferopol and Crimea Klyment, these hostile actions of the Russian occupying power towards the Ukrainian Church are aimed at the complete destruction of Ukrainian identity and Ukrainians as a separate nation in Crimea.

In May 2015, the Ukrainian Cultural Center was established in Crimea, whose participants aimed to preserve Ukrainian culture and language on the peninsula. Members of the center were repeatedly detained by Russian law enforcement agencies for conducting events to celebrate Ukrainian commemorative dates, some of the participants were searched at home, several were held administratively liable by a Russian court, and they were persecuted for their views at the everyday level. In August 2017, the center started publishing the newspaper "Krymsky Teren" in Ukrainian and Russian.

In 2015, after the persecution of members of the UCC, the organization "Ukrainian Community of Crimea" was created, headed by Oleg Usyk, a member of "United Russia", but it later ceased to exist. In 2018, a new legal public organization "Ukrainian Community of Crimea" was founded in Crimea, headed by Anastasia Hrydchyna, a member of the Young Guard of United Russia. This organization expresses support for the actions of the Russian authorities, denies the persecution of Ukrainians on the peninsula, participates in official events of the local occupation authorities, holds several congresses of the Ukrainian diaspora in Crimea, and created the Ukrainian-language website "Pereyaslavska rada 2.0". According to historian Andrii Ivanets and journalists of the Krim.Realii project, in fact this organization does not care about the problems of Ukrainians in Crimea and was created as a means of information warfare.

According to the Constitution of the Republic of Crimea adopted in April 2014, Ukrainian became one of the official languages of this subject (along with Russian and Crimean Tatar). Despite this, the sphere of use of the Ukrainian language is constantly shrinking. After the occupation of 2014, the study of the Ukrainian language on the peninsula was made optional, and its use in official records was stopped altogether. The number of students with Ukrainian language of instruction continues to decrease. According to official Russian statistics, 12,892 students studied Ukrainian in the 2016/2017 academic year, and 6,400 students in the 2017/2018 academic year. At the same time, according to Ukrainian and international observers, the real number of students with the Ukrainian language of instruction is much lower than officially declared. According to Crimean human rights group, during the occupation, the number of students studying Ukrainian decreased 31 times —from 13,589 students in 2013 to 371 students in 2016. In April 2017, following Ukraine's appeal, the International Court of Justice UN in The Hague considered the case of Russia's violation of the International Convention on the Elimination of All Forms of Racial Discrimination and adopted a decision according to which Russia should provide opportunities for teaching in the Ukrainian language on the peninsula. According to the UN, in the 2017/2018 school year, there were 318 students in Crimea who studied in Ukrainian. Before the occupation, there were 7 Ukrainian schools in Crimea, but by 2018 all of them were translated into Russian. According to official data of the Russian Ministry of Education of the Crimea, in the 2018/2019 school year in the Crimea, out of 200,700 children, only 249 (0.2%) studied in the Ukrainian language, there was one Ukrainian-language school and 5 schools with 8 classes with the Ukrainian language of instruction. According to the report of the Crimean human rights group in 2019, not a single school remained in Crimea with the Ukrainian language of instruction, and there were even fewer Ukrainian-language classes than officially claimed.

== Analysis ==
Ukrainian historians and politicians assumed a similar development of events back in 2008 during the Russo-Georgian War. Experts pointed out that the Russian Federation only needed a pretext to start annexing the peninsula. The events at the Euromaidan and the Revolution of Dignity became such an occasion.

In November 2014, Andrey Illarionov, a former economical adviser to President of Russia Vladimir Putin and a dissident, claimed that talks of a Russian invasion began long before Yanukovych's appeal.

In January 2017, Ilya Ponomarev, a Russian politician and member of the State Duma of Russia (Fair Russia faction), claimed that the leadership of the annexation of Crimea was entrusted to Defense Minister Sergei Shoigu and Vladimir Putin's aide Vladislav Surkov.

On 17 December 2019, the Ministry of Foreign Affairs of Ukraine has brought up that, in his opinion, Russia's actions in Crimea and Donbas fully fall under the definition of aggression in accordance with UN General Assembly Resolution 1976: "Since 2014, Ukrainian government, has been constantly qualifying the internationally illegal actions of the Russian Federation in Crimea and Donbas as an act of aggression. We clearly and consistently proving that such actions of the Russian Federation fully fall within the definition of aggression in accordance with paragraphs a), b), c), d), e) and g) of Article 3 of the Annex to UN General Assembly Resolution 3314 (XXIX) "Definition aggression", adopted 45 years ago".

On 11 December 2022, The Washington Post published an article reporting that the Western world, while supporting Ukraine, fears that any Ukrainian counteroffensive in Crimea could prompt Vladimir Putin to take decisive action, potentially even using nuclear weapons. Some Western officials hope that an agreement on Ukraine's renunciation of Crimea in favor of Russia can become the basis for a diplomatic end to the war. A proponent of Ukraine, Rory Finnin, an associate professor at the Department of Ukrainian Studies at the University of Cambridge, believes that a compromise regarding Crimea is unlikely:

The idea that somehow Ukraine should just go back to the status quo post-2014 is foolish because all that will happen is another escalation. It is hard to imagine Ukrainians being comfortable with giving up this territory, knowing this means the abandonment of millions of people. The moral and geopolitical stakes of such an abandonment are grave.

== Control of settlements ==
Name	Pop.	Municipality or raion	Held by	As of	More information
Alupka	8,087	Yalta Municipality	Russia	4 Jan 2024	Captured by Russia on 27 February 2014.
Alushta	30,194	Alushta Municipality	Russia	4 Jan 2024	Captured by Russia on 27 February 2014.
Armiansk	21,239	Armiansk Municipality	Russia	4 Jan 2024	Captured by Russia on 27 February 2014.
Bakhchysarai	26,090	Bakhchysarai Raion	Russia	4 Jan 2024	Captured by Russia on 27 February 2014.
Bilohirsk	16,354 (Note: 2014 census)	Bilohirsk Raion	Russia	4 Jan 2024	Captured by Russia on 27 February 2014.
Kerch	149,566	Kerch City	Russia	24 Feb 2022	Captured by Russia on 27 February 2014.
Sevastopol	509,992	none (Note: City with special status)	Russia	24 Feb 2022	Captured by Russia on 27 February 2014.
Simferopol	332,317	Simferopol City	Russia	24 Feb 2022	Captured by Russia on 27 February 2014.
Yalta	76,746	Yalta City	Russia	24 Feb 2022	Captured by Russia on 27 February 2014.
Yevpatoria	105,719	Yevpatoria City	Russia	24 Feb 2022	Captured by Russia on 27 February 2014.

== See also ==
- List of active separatist movements in Europe
- List of states with limited recognition
- Russian invasion of Ukraine
- Russo-Ukrainian War
- Outline of the Russo-Ukrainian War
- Day of Resistance to Occupation of Crimea and Sevastopol
- Russian annexation of Donetsk, Kherson, Luhansk and Zaporizhzhia oblasts
- Russian-occupied territories of Ukraine (former occupation marked in italics)
  - Russian occupation of Chernihiv Oblast
  - Russian occupation of Donetsk Oblast
  - Russian occupation of Dnipropetrovsk Oblast
  - Russian occupation of Kharkiv Oblast
  - Russian occupation of Kherson Oblast
  - Russian occupation of Kyiv Oblast
  - Russian occupation of Luhansk Oblast
  - Russian occupation of Mykolaiv Oblast
  - Russian occupation of Sumy Oblast
  - Russian occupation of Zaporizhzhia Oblast
  - Russian occupation of Zhytomyr Oblast
  - Snake Island campaign
- Annexation of Crimea by the Russian Federation
- 2022 protests in Russian-occupied Ukraine
- Ukrainian resistance during the 2022 Russian invasion of Ukraine
- War crimes in the Russian invasion of Ukraine
- Russian war crimes
- War crime
- Terrorism
