= Day of Resistance to Occupation of Crimea and Sevastopol =

Holiday in Ukraine

Day of Resistance to Occupation of the Autonomous Republic of Crimea and the City of Sevastopol День кримського спротиву російській окупації
- Observed by: Ukraine
- Date: February 26
- Frequency: Annual
- First time: 2021
- Related to: 2014 Russian annexation of Crimea

The Day of Resistance to Occupation of the Autonomous Republic of Crimea and the City of Sevastopol (Ukrainian: День кримського спротиву російській окупації, romanized: Den krymskoho sprotyvu rosiiskii okupatsii) is an annual designated day in Ukraine, commemorating a 2014 demonstration by thousands of Crimean Tatars outside the parliament of the Autonomous Republic of Crimea. It took place on the day before Russian Federation soldiers took armed control of the parliament in preparation for the annexation of Crimea.

== History ==
It was celebrated once in 2016 in accordance with a resolution of the Verkhovna Rada of Ukraine on 2 February 2016. The holiday was created officially by a decree of president Volodymyr Zelenskyy and first observed on 26 February 2021.
