= Timeline of the Russian annexation of Crimea =

The Russian annexation of Crimea took place in the aftermath of the 2014 Ukrainian Revolution of Dignity. On 22–23 February, Russian President Vladimir Putin convened an all-night meeting with security services chiefs to discuss pullout of deposed President, Viktor Yanukovych, and at the end of that meeting Putin remarked that "we must start working on returning Crimea to Russia.". Russia sent in soldiers on February 27, 2014. Crimea held a referendum. According to official Russian and Crimean sources 95% voted to reunite with Russia. The legitimacy of the referendum has been questioned by the international community on both legal and procedural grounds.

== February 2014 ==
=== February 19 ===
Members of the Sevastopol City Council petitioned to President Viktor Yanukovych to take stringent measures and bring leaders of the opposition to justice. "Leaders of opposition should be held criminally liable for inciting armed confrontation," – stated the declaration. In Simferopol, activists of "Stop Maidan" were commemorating Crimean law enforcement agents who perished in conflict in Kyiv. In Yalta, over 50 activists attended an anti-government protest and demonstrated support for Euromaidan.

=== February 20 ===
Speaker of the Supreme Council of Crimea, Vladimir Konstantinov announced that he does not exclude possibility of secession of Crimea from Ukraine if the situation in the country worsens. The head of Mejlis of the Crimean Tatar People Refat Chubarov criticized the announcement and said that Konstantinov who was in Moscow at the time, openly invited Russian security forces to intervene in Crimean internal politics.

The Russian military operation against Ukraine started on this date, according to the inscription on the Medal "For the Return of Crimea", awarded by the Russian Ministry of Defence. A Ukrainian law signed September 2015 designated this as the "date of the start of the temporary occupation".

=== February 23 ===
In Simferopol, a pro-Euromaidan rally was held in support of the new Ukrainian authorities. The protesters also demanded the resignation of the Crimean parliament and waved Ukrainian, Tatar, and European Union flags. The Prime Minister of Crimea Anatolii Mohyliov declared that the region would carry out all laws passed by the Ukrainian parliament.

Meanwhile in Sevastopol, tens of thousands protested against the new authorities and voted to establish a parallel administration and civil self-defense squads. Some were created on 22 February in Simferopol, where about 5,000 people joined such squads. Protesters waved Russian flags and chanted "Putin is our president" and claimed they would refuse to pay further taxes to the state. Russian military convoys were also alleged to be seen in the area. In Kerch, pro-Russian protesters attempted to remove the Ukrainian flag from atop city hall and replace it with the flag of Russia. Over 200 attended waving flags of Russia, orange-and-black St. George and the Russian Unity party. Mayor Oleh Osadchy attempted to disperse the crowd and police eventually arrived to keep the protesters at bay. Osadchy said: "This is the territory of Ukraine, Crimea. Here's a flag of Crimea" but was accused of treason and a fight ensued over the flagpole.

=== February 24 ===
More protesters rallied outside the Sevastopol administration offices. Pro-Russian demonstrators accompanied by neo-Cossacks demanded the selection of a Russian citizen as mayor (which was refused by the city council) and planted Russian flags at city hall; they also handed out leaflets calling for volunteers to a militia and warning that the "Blue-Brown Europlague is knocking."

On 24 February, a pro-Russian rally in Sevastopol chose Aleksei Chalyi, a Russian citizen, as mayor. This was controversial because Sevastopol has no mayor (Note: Sevastopol is the only city in Ukraine whose residents do not get to elect their mayor directly, due to the city's special status.) as the Chairman of the Sevastopol City State Administration (Governor of Sevastopol) who is appointed by the President of Ukraine by statute fulfils this role. A thousand protesters present chanted "a Russian mayor for a Russian city." Crowds gathered again outside Sevastopol's city hall again as rumours spread that security forces could arrest Aleksei Chalyi, but police chief Alexander Goncharov said that his officers would refuse to carry out "criminal orders" issued by the central government. Viktor Neganov, a Sevastopol-based adviser to the interior minister, condemned the events in the city as a coup. "Chalyi represents the interests of the Kremlin which likely gave its tacit approval." The Chairman of the Sevastopol City State Administration, appointed by the President of Ukraine, Vladimir Yatsuba, was booed and whistled on February 23, when he told a pro-Russian rally that Crimea was a part of Ukraine. He resigned the next day.

=== February 25 ===
Several hundred pro-Russian protesters blocked the Crimean parliament and demanded a referendum on Crimea's independence. The rally was organized by the Crimean Front. Another large property of former president Yanukovych was discovered close to Sevastopol four times the size of that in the capital Kyiv. The Night Wolves were holding the administrative buildings of city of Simferopol and Kerch.

Also Russian armored personnel carriers were deployed to protect "Russian Interests" in the city of Sevastopol. The APCs with Russian marines were in Nakhimov Square and the courtyard of the Moscow House.

=== February 26 ===
On February 26, thousands of protesters clashed in Simferopol. Near the Supreme Council of Crimea building between 4,000 and 5,000 Crimean Tatars and supporters of the Euromaidan-Crimea movement faced 600–700 supporters of pro-Russian organisations and the Russian Unity Party. Chairman of the Supreme Council of Crimea Volodymyr Konstantinov said that the Crimean parliament will not discuss the issue of separation from Ukraine and that earlier reports that parliament would discuss the motion were provocations. During the clashes, one man died of a heart attack and a woman died from being trampled. Crimean Tatars created self-defense groups and called on activists to unite with Russian, Ukrainian and people of other nationalities to avoid provocations and to protect churches, mosques, synagogues and other important sites. By nightfall, the Crimean Tatars had left, while the pro-Russian rally had grown to 5,000 as protesters arrived from Sevastopol later in the day. The new Ukrainian establishment's acting Interior Minister Arsen Avakov tasked Crimean law enforcement agencies not to provoke conflicts and to do whatever necessary to prevent clashes with pro-Russian forces and added that "I think, that way – through a dialogue – we shall achieve much more than with standoffs " The new head of the Security Service of Ukraine (SBU) Valentyn Nalyvaichenko requested United Nations round-the-clock monitoring of the security situation on the peninsula.

Also on February 26, media claimed that Russian troops or (as they themselves claimed) local volunteers took control of the main route of access to Sevastopol. A military checkpoint, with military vehicles under a Russian flag, was set up on the main highway between the city and Simferopol. CNN described them as a "pro-Russian militia checkpoint".

=== February 27 ===
On February 27, at 4:20 local time, sixty pro-Russian gunmen seized Crimea's parliament building and Council of Ministers building. They were said to be professionals and heavily armed. Thirty broke into the building initially, with a bus carrying another thirty and additional weapons arriving later. The gunmen were unmarked but raised Russian flags.

While the gunmen occupied Crimea's parliament building, the parliament held an emergency session. It voted to terminate the Crimean government, and replace Prime Minister Anatolii Mohyliov with Sergey Aksyonov. Aksyonov belonged to the Russian Unity party, which received 4% of the vote in the last election. It also voted to hold a referendum on greater autonomy on 25 May. The gunmen had cut all of the building's communications and took MPs' phones as they entered. No independent journalists were allowed inside the building while the votes were taking place. Some MPs claimed they were being threatened and that votes were cast for them and other MPs, even though they were not in the chamber.

Interfax-Ukraine reported "it is impossible to find out whether all the 64 members of the 100-member legislature who were registered as present at when the two decisions were voted on or whether someone else used the plastic voting cards of some of them" because due to the armed occupation of parliament it was unclear how many MPs were present. The head of parliament's information and analysis department, Olha Sulnikova, had phoned from inside the parliamentary building to journalists and had told them 61 of the registered 64 deputies had voted for the referendum resolution and 55 for the resolution to dismiss the government. They also installed a new Prime Minister. According to the Constitution of Ukraine, the Prime Minister of Crimea is appointed by the Supreme Council of Crimea in consultation with the President of Ukraine.

The chairman of the Supreme Council of Crimea, Volodymyr Konstantinov, as well as de facto prime minister Aksyonov, refused to recognize the dismissal of Viktor Yanukovych from presidential office, and view him as legitimate. Aksyonov added "we will follow his directions".

The new Prime Minister of Ukraine, Arseniy Yatsenyuk, warned "We must immediately declare that anyone who is on the streets with guns – these people are prosecuted by law".

On the morning of February 27, Berkut units from Crimea and other regions of Ukraine (dissolved by the decree of 25 February) seized checkpoints on the Isthmus of Perekop and Chonhar peninsula. According to MP Hennadiy Moskal, former Chief of Crimean police, they had armoured personnel carriers, grenade launchers, assault rifles, machine guns and other weapons. Since then they control all traffic by land between Crimea and continental Ukraine.

On February 27, 2014 the Ukrainian organization Right Sector officially announced that it does not intend to participate in any conflict on the territory of Crimea.

=== February 28 ===
In the early hours of February 28, a group of 50–119 armed men in military uniform without signs of identification (designated later as "Green men") seized control over Simferopol International Airport and local TV tower. Airport authorities later denied that it had been "captured" and said that it was still operating normally despite the continuing armed presence. Later in the day, Sevastopol International Airport was occupied in a similar manner as Simferopol's airport. According to the Minister of Internal Affairs, Arsen Avakov, soldiers without identification are Russian Black Sea Fleet troops. Later some television channels reported that airports are guarded by Russian forces. It was then claimed that militants in Simferopol airport are soldiers of the Russian MI whose plane was noticed at the Hvardiyske Airport at Hvardiiske near Simferopol.

According to the official website of the Night Wolves bikers club, at the time they were guarding the state administration in Sevastopol. They were still blocking the roads.

On February 28, 2014, a missile boat of the Russian Federation blocked the Balaklava Harbor, where ships of the Ukrainian Sea Guard were stationed. Eight Russian military helicopters were moved to Sevastopol from Anapa. On 28 February 2014, Yuriy A. Sergeyev told UN Security Council that the helicopters were not transportation crafts, but rather an assault Mi-24. Serhiy Kunitsyn informed journalists that Crimea is to be visited by the Russian delegation of Vladimir Zhirinovsky and Konstantin Zatulin.

Serhiy Kunitsyn informed journalists that 13 Russian planes IL-76 with Russian Airborne Troops landed in the Hvardiyske military airport (Hvardiiske). Kunitsyn stated that each plane may hold about 150 people.

The Ukrainian parliamentarian, Petro Poroshenko, who arrived in Simferopol, was attacked by an angry mob, but managed to get away unharmed. Chairman of the Supreme Council of Crimea Volodymyr Konstantinov was booed by a gathered crowd of protesters who were yelling "Crimea – Russia".

On February 28, The Ministry of Defense of Ukraine acknowledged the threat of possible takeovers of military units in Crimea during the night on Saturday by radical forces. On February 28, facing possible Russian intervention, U.S. President Barack Obama stated that any military action would "Come at a cost," following his denunciation of Russian aggression in the region. On February 28 the leaders of Ukraine received a message from Russia. According to the notification to defense minister Ihor Tenyukh Ukraine must give the Crimea peninsula to Russia without any military defense or Russia will occupy the whole country. Ousted President Yanukovych insisted that military action was "unacceptable" and that he would not request Russian military intervention at a press conference. According to Yanukovych Crimea must remain part of Ukraine.

== March 2014 ==
=== March 1 ===
On March 1, 2014 the de facto Crimean Prime Minister Sergey Aksyonov appealed directly to Russian President Vladimir Putin in a signed statement calling for Russia to "provide assistance in ensuring peace and tranquility on the territory" of Crimea. Meanwhile, Aksyonov took control of "security [in Crimea] on a temporary basis", he said. All commanders are to obey his orders or "resign". Akysonov also announced that the date of the self-sovereignty referendum was moved up to 30 March.

Protests against the new authorities in Kyiv and in support of Russians in Crimea occurred throughout Eastern and Southern Ukraine on March 1.

On March 1, the interim president of Ukraine, Turchynov, signed a decree declaring the appointment of Sergei Aksyonov as the head of the government of Crimea to be unconstitutional.

Russian President Vladimir Putin formally asked the Federation Council for permission to "use the armed forces of the Russian Federation on the territory of Ukraine until the normalization of the socio-political situation in that country." Hours later, the Federation Council voted unanimously to grant permission.

The Consulate of the Russian Federation in Simferopol started to issue Russian passports to residents of Ukraine. Members of the former Ukrainian riot police, Berkut, were among the first in Crimea to be granted Russian citizenship.

The Ukrainian Navy was forced to leave its base in Sevastopol, as was the Ukrainian Sea Guard. Some journalists later claimed that this was disinformation posted by RIA News.

Beginning March 1, Ukrainian journalists were prohibited from entering the Crimean region, reportedly on the orders of members of the Supreme Council.

Ukrainian media reported that decisions to replace the government and hold a referendum in Crimea were falsified.

According to Damon Wilson, vice president of the Atlantic Council, the United States Congress was "considering authorizing [a] defense arms package to Ukraine".

=== March 2 ===
On March 2, 2014 a Ukrainian marine infantry detachment stationed around Feodosiya was surrounded by armed men demanding surrender by 9:00AM EET. In Sudak, radar station personnel were forced to give up their arms. The Ukrainian Navy building in Sevastopol was under siege and land-based assault by the Russian Army according to Ukrainska Pravda.

On March 2, acting President Olexander Turchynov ordered all Ukrainian military reservists to be called up.

At a Ukrainian military base near the village of Perevalne, there is an ongoing standoff between a handful of Ukrainian marines loyal to Kyiv and the surrounding Russian/Crimean forces.

The newly appointed chief of the Ukrainian Navy, Denis Berezovsky, in televised statement announced that he refuses to follow orders from the self-declared government in Kyiv and declared loyalty to Crimean authorities and people. He was replaced by Serhiy Hayduk.

The same day in Sevastopol, the crew of the command ship Slavutych thwarted an attempt to hijack the vessel by a boat carrying unidentified armed personnel.

The government of Crimea announced the formation of its own Defence Ministry.

Ukrainian oligarchs, including Igor Kolomoisky and Serhiy Taruta (partner of Rinat Akhmetov), throw weight behind revolutionary government in Kyiv; get appointments as governors of eastern provinces.

The head of the Security Service of Crimea Petyor Zima, Chief of Department of Internal Affairs in the Crimea Sergey Abisov, the head of Service for Emergency Situations Sergei Shakhov and acting Chief of the Border Guards of Crimea Victor Melnichenko each took an oath of allegiance to the people of the so-called "Putin-backed" Crimea. The ceremony took place in the Council of Ministers chamber in the presence of regional government officials, mayors of different cities and regions.

=== March 3 ===
According to Interfax news agency quoted a source in the Ukrainian Defence Ministry, Ukrainian troops stationed in Crimea were urged to surrender by March 3 at 5 a.m. (0300 GMT) or face an armed confrontation via an ultimatum issued by Alexander Vitko, the commander of the Russian Black Sea Fleet. The ministry did not immediately confirm the report and there was no immediate comment by the Black Sea Fleet. This ultimatum was denied by Russian officials.

On the same day, Russian soldiers seized a Kerch Strait ferry terminal in the city of Kerch, the easternmost point of Crimea.

Crimea's State Television and Radio Transmitting Center forced the independent broadcaster Chernomorskaya Teleradiokompaniya (Black Sea TV) off the air. Chernomorskaya Teleradiokompaniya, which has covered the political tension in the region, was one of two local broadcasters available to Crimean residents.

=== March 4 ===
On March 4, Putin ended the military exercises and pulled troops back from Ukrainian borders. Putin stated in a press conference that the soldiers occupying military bases were not Russian soldiers, but local forces of self-defence. He said that there was no need to send forces into Ukraine at the time being, but that Russia reserved the right to use "all means" as a last resort to threats of anarchy.

There was a confrontation at the Belbek Airbase (at the Belbek Airport) between the guarding Russian/Crimean forces—and unarmed Ukrainian soldiers who had surrendered the base the previous day.—lasting some hours. Around 200 unarmed Ukrainian soldiers of the 240th Tactical Air Brigade marched towards the base, demanding their jobs back, when the pro-Russian forces fired warning shots in the air. After hours of negotiations, the pro-Russian forces agreed to allow joint patrols of the base—with the Ukrainians remaining unarmed, followed by the Ukrainian detachment marching away.

=== March 5 ===
On March 5, the Crimean government (ARC) announced that "more than 700 soldiers and officers" from the 50th, 55th and 147th antiaircraft missile regiments, stationed in Yalta, Feodosia and Fiolente respectively, defected to the ARC side by "declaring their readiness to defend the population of Crimea". This is in addition to the 204th Fighter Unit of the Ukrainian Air Force, which defected on March 3. Altogether, as of March 5, the Crimeans claim to have 6000 defectors from the Ukrainian Armed Forces on their side.

Thirty-five Russian soldiers were said to have attacked the border checkpoint in Kerch and threatening an armed assault on Ukrainian service personnel. The same day, the State Border Guard Service of Ukraine informed that unknown persons took hostage Ukrainian Colonel General Mykhailo Koval. One witness claims that he was taken by Russian bikers who attacked the personal car of Koval in Yalta. The Ukrainian soldiers detained one of the "Green Men" Aleksei Sergeievich Medvedev from Yoshkar Ola according to his military ticket (military identification document).

Unknown gunmen took hostage the UN special envoy to Ukraine Robert Serry in Simferopol. U.N. Deputy Secretary General Jan Eliasson said Robert Serry had been threatened but had not been kidnapped. Serry is expected to continue his work in Kyiv due to situation in Crimea.

The Shevchenko district court of Kyiv, meanwhile, ruled on the detention of the self-proclaimed leaders Sergei Aksyonov and Volodymyr Konstantinov. The Security Service of Ukraine was charged to bring them to court. The General Prosecutor of Ukraine opened criminal proceedings against the commander of Black Sea Fleet Aleksandr Vitko on the facts of incitement to treason and sabotage organization.

Three deputies of the Batkivshchyna party submitted a bill in the Verkhovna Rada on March 5 that would abolish the country's official neutrality, and make "Euro-Atlantic integration and NATO membership" a foreign policy priority for Ukraine.

On March 5, a wiretapped telephone conversation was leaked on YouTube of Estonian Foreign Minister Urmas Paet and European Union foreign affairs chief Catherine Ashton discussing the issue of sniper-rifle fire during the 2014 Ukrainian revolution. Speaking about a doctor named Olga who was on the scene, Paet told Ashton, "The same Olga told that, well, all the evidence shows that people who were killed by snipers from both sides among policemen and then people from the street [sic]. So that there is now stronger and stronger understanding that behind the snipers it was not Yanukovich, but it was somebody from the new coalition." The Estonian Ministry of Foreign Affairs later issued a statement confirming the tape's authenticity, but denied that "the new coalition" refers to the protesters who later overthrew Yanukovich and installed a new government in Kyiv. Olga Bogomolets, the doctor who allegedly told Paet about the snipers, denied claiming that protesters and Berkut troops came under fire from one single source and stated that she only saw the protesters' wounds, and that the government assured her that an investigation would be opened.

=== March 6 ===
The Supreme Council of Crimea voted on 6 March to formally re-accede as part of the Russian Federation after 60 years of being part of the Ukrainian state. The Supreme Council's decision will be put to the Crimean people via referendum if the request is granted by Russia. The previously announced referendum scheduled for 30 March, will be moved up to 16 March 2014, and its question will be altered to reflect the Supreme Council's 6 March vote of accepting full accession. The Ukrainian government immediately condemned the measure and argued that any unilateral referendum initiated by the current Crimean authorities would be unconstitutional. They were joined in their condemnation of the referendum by the United States and European Union. Refat Chubarov, leader of the Mejlis of the Crimean Tatar People, announced that his organization will not take part in the referendum, and that they deem it illegitimate. According to Council member Pilunsky the decision was taken without meeting the quorum.

Armed men seized the Simferopol Radio and Television Transmitting Station, and discontinued the broadcast of Kyiv-based Channel 5 and 1+1 television channels, replacing their frequencies with the Moscow-based Rossiya 24 news channel.

On March 6 Russian sailors scuttled the decommissioned cruiser Ochakov at the entrance to Donuzlav Bay in western Crimea as a blockship, in an attempt to prevent Ukrainian navy ships from gaining access to the Black Sea.

Crimean Tatars report that their homes are marked with X by unidentified gangs.

A mission of observers from the Organisation for Security and Cooperation in Europe has been stopped from entering Ukraine's Crimean Peninsula by unidentified men in military fatigues for the third time.

=== March 7 ===
According to the Ukrainian State Border Guard Service Russia raised the number of their soldiers in Crimea to 30,000.

Two journalists were beaten while taking photos outside the missile defence base A2355 outside the Crimean city of Sevastopol. A Bulgarian media team of two were beaten in Simferopol. Armed men confiscated the equipment of the Associated Press team in Simferopol.

Another blockship, the former Black Sea Fleet rescue/diving support vessel BM-416 (VM-416) was scuttled near the Ochakov.

PACE's Standing Committee expressed its full support for the territorial integrity and national unity of Ukraine.

Ukraine decided not to boycott the Paralympic games as long as Russia did not start a war. During the opening only Ukrainian athlete Mykailo Tkachenko of 31 Ukrainian Paralympians attended the ceremony parade in protest at Russia's incursion into Crimea.

=== March 8 ===
The Russian military entered the territory of Chonhar village in Henichesk Raion of Kherson Oblast and blocked the second entrance to Crimea.

The Border Guard Service Department Sholkino was taken over by Russian forces. The personnel and their families had to leave the post and the apartments.

A border guard plane flying over Crimea was attacked with firearms.

=== March 9 ===
At Massandra a mobile, rapid reaction border guard post has been unblocked after several days of occupation. Head of Euromaidan — Krym Andriy Shchekun has been kidnapped in Simferopol.

More than 200 scholars of Ukrainian and Russian affairs have undersigned an appeal for a peaceful, sustainable, and fair resolution to the current conflict.

=== March 10 ===
Two Ukrainian journalists (Olena Maksymenko and Oles Kromplyas) disappeared and are feared kidnapped at the border to Crimea.

Several hundred residents of Crimea, mainly Crimean Tatars, have left Crimea for security reasons according to the State Border Guard Service of Ukraine.

Russian forces have seized the main military hospital in Simferopol.

Prominent Russian dissident Mikhail Khodorkovsky said that Crimea should stay within Ukraine with broader autonomy.

Posters and leaflets campaigning for the referendum do not show who is behind.

=== March 11 ===
A joint resolution is adopted by the Supreme Council of Crimea and the Sevastopol City Council where they express their intention to self-declare themselves independent in the event of a Yes vote in a referendum to join the region to Russia, that was to be held on March 16.

The Crimean Government made clear that they did not officially invite the OSCE to observe the referendum. The OSCE chair, Switzerland's Foreign Minister Didier Burkhalter, declared the referendum as illegal and because of that the OSCE will not send observers.

Unidentified forces started controlling passport and luggages of domestic travellers at the Simferopol railway station.

Russian forces took over the control tower at Simferopol International Airport and closed Crimean airspace until the end of week. Ukraine International Airlines flight PS 65 had to return to Kyiv shortly before landing.

Party of Regions MP Yuriy Miroshnychenko urged the Crimean government to stop the referendum. Another Party of Regions MP, Hanna Herman, commented the same day about Yanukovych's press conference, "He needs to ... prevent the illegal referendum".

On the same day, US National Security Advisor Susan Rice emphasized LGBT rights as part of the US government's "bedrock commitment to advancing human rights and human dignity" before a gathering of top US diplomats at the State Department. Rice's speech omitted any reference to Crimea and mentioned Russia only once in passing. Ukraine was mentioned twice. This overemphasis on LGBT rights, just five days before the Crimean referendum, was subsequently panned as a possible reason why the US responded ineptly to Crimea's annexation.

=== March 12 ===
A set of press regulations was issued by the Crimean parliament concerning the referendum on March 16, stating, among other things, that authorized journalists covering the elections are obliged "not to spread material with negative content"

The multinational OSCE observation mission published a report about their observations while trying to enter Crimea. Their entrance was refused at gunpoint. Their observation "produced significant evidence of equipment consistent with the presence of Russian Federation military personnel in the vicinity of the various roadblocks encountered".

The UN Human Rights Envoy Ivan Šimonović had to cancel his trip to Crimea as the current situation does not permit his travel. He intended to observe the human rights situation which was Russia's explanation for its engagement in Crimea.

The European Parliament rejected the upcoming referendum on independence in Crimea, which they saw as manipulated and contrary to international and Ukrainian law.

Group of 7 world leaders said that they would not recognize the results of a referendum for Ukraine's Crimea region. The leaders called on Russia to "immediately" halt actions supporting the referendum on Crimea regarding its status.

=== March 13 ===
Russia has voiced support for the deployment of an OSCE monitoring mission in Ukraine, including Crimea, the chairman of the European security group said on Thursday, calling this a possible "big step forward."

The National Guard of Ukraine is reconstituted, on the basis of a law passed the previous day (Law of Ukraine "On the National Guard of Ukraine" dated March 12, 2014). Note: The legislation reforming the National Guard was signed into law on this date by the acting president, but not returned to the parliament until the next day (14 March).

The Russian Armed Forces announced a new set of sudden military exercises in the border regions of Rostov, Belgorod, and Kursk on 13 March, involving "artillery batteries, assault helicopters, and at least 10,000 soldiers". Amateur footage has shown columns of trucks and armored vehicles amassing at the border town of Lopan, just 30 miles outside of Kharkiv. The United States Department of State has said that the Russian military exercises have "certainly created an environment of intimidation [in Ukraine]".

=== March 14 ===
The United States and Russia found no middle ground on the Ukrainian crisis, after six hours of talks in London.

Rostec, a Russian-state arms agency, announced that it had intercepted a surveillance drone flying over the skies of Crimea on 14 March, which belonged to the Bavaria-based 66th Military Intelligence Brigade of the United States Army. It disabled the drone "with the help of the EW (electronic warfare) complex Avtobaza," and as a result, "the device made an emergency landing and passed into the possession of the [Crimean] self-defense forces almost unbroken." The company further claimed that this is the second U.S. drone to be intercepted over Crimea since the crisis began. The Pentagon subsequently denied Rostec's claims, saying that "there is zero truth" to the reports.

=== March 15 ===
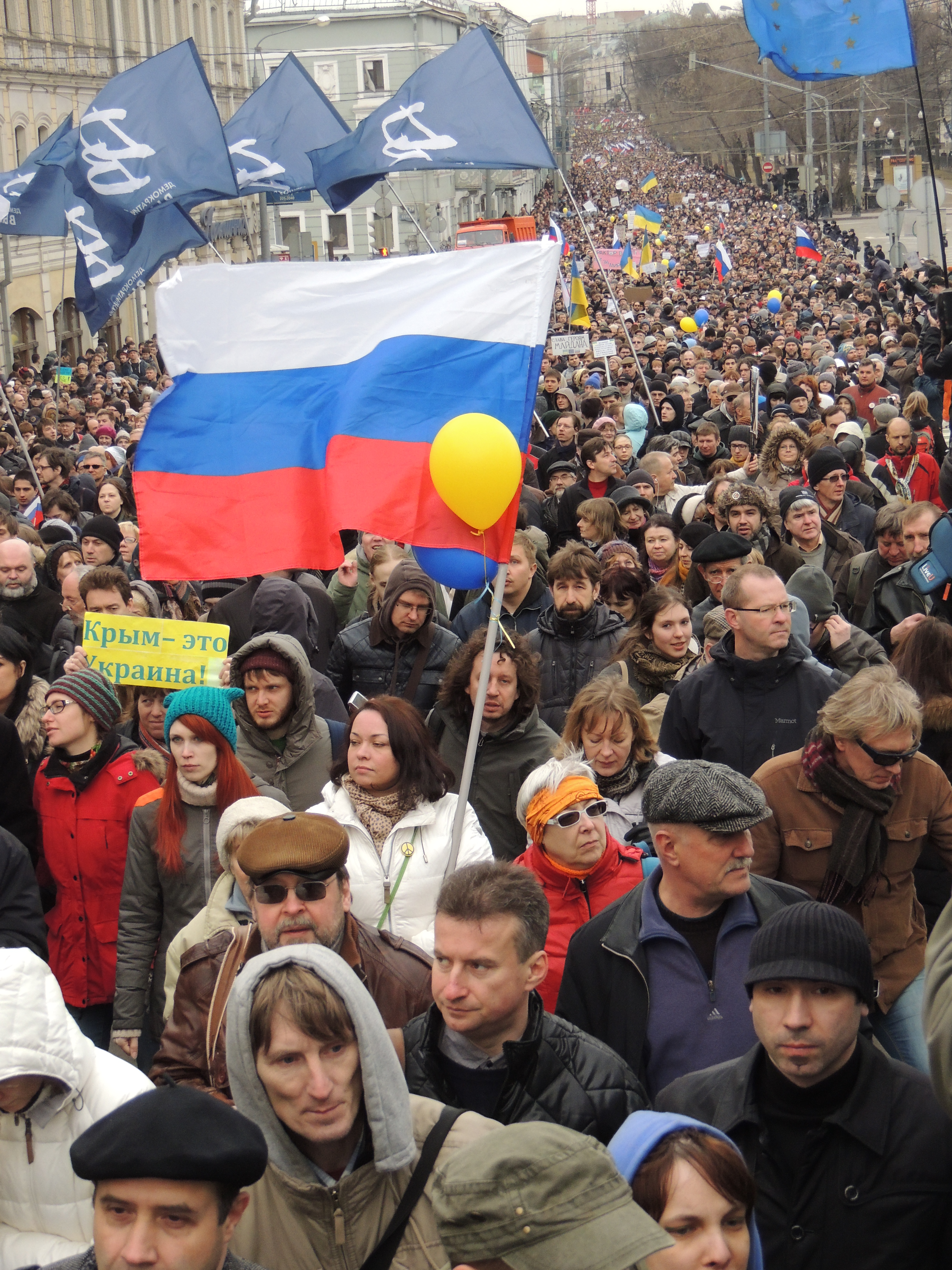
Around 50,000 people rallied in Moscow protesting Russia's annexation of Crimea.

A day before the Crimean referendum, tens of thousands of Russian demonstrators held anti-war protests in Moscow opposing Russian military intervention in Ukraine. It was the largest protest in Russia since the 2011–13 Russian protests.

=== March 16 ===
Crimeans vote in a referendum to rejoin Russia or return to its status under the 1992 constitution.

On March 16, 2014, Crimean news agencies are now reporting that the official results of the referendum are in, and the region overwhelmingly voted to re-join Russia. Some 95.5% of voters in Crimea have supported joining Russia, officials say. Election officials said the turnout was a record high, beating the numbers who vote in local elections.

The defence ministries of Ukraine and Russia agree on a truce in Crimea until March 21, according to the acting Ukrainian defence minister.

=== March 17 ===
On March 17, the Crimean parliament officially declared its independence from Ukraine and requested full accession to the Russian Federation, thus ending Crimea's 60 years as a Ukrainian territory.

Obama declared sanctions on 11 Ukrainian and Russian officials considered responsible for the crisis.

Markets surged as investor worries faded after the referendum passed without violence. The Dow Jones Industrial Average increased by nearly 1%.

Abkhazia, Nagorno-Karabakh, Russia, and South Ossetia officially recognize the independence of Crimea.

The dead body of Reşat Ametovyaky, an ethnic Crimean Tatar, was found in the Belogorskiy Region of Crimea. He disappeared on his way to the recruitment office on March 3 after the announcement of partial military mobilization in Ukraine and is believed to have been abducted. He was found dead with signs of torture; his hands were handcuffed and his head was covered in duct tape.

=== March 18 ===
The Treaty on Accession of the Republic of Crimea to Russia is signed, formally joining the self-declared independent Republic of Crimea to the Russian Federation as two federal subjects - the Republic of Crimea and the federal city of Sevastopol.

One Ukrainian soldier and one pro-Russian demonstrator were killed in the Simferopol Incident.

Crimean Deputy Prime Minister Rustam Temirgaliyev said in an interview with RIA Novosti the new government in Crimea wants to regularize the land unofficially taken over by Crimean Tatar squatters following the collapse of the Soviet Union. He said part of the land was required for social needs but the Government of Crimea was ready to allocate and legalize many other plots of land to ensure a normal life for the Crimean Tatars. He also emphasized that members of the Tatar community could receive senior political positions in the new government, in a move to ease ethnic tensions in the region.

President of Russia Vladimir Putin addressed State Duma deputies, Federation Council members, heads of Russian regions and civil society representatives in the Kremlin, calling for the creation of "two new constituent entities within the Russian Federation: the Republic of Crimea and the city of Sevastopol".

=== March 19 ===
Russian soldiers storm Ukrainian military bases in Crimea. At Sevastopol, a tug from the Black Sea Fleet attacked and damaged the Ukrainian corvette Ternopil by launching grenades at the ship while circling around.

=== March 20 ===
Verkhovna Rada of Ukraine passes a resolution to adopt a bill on "territorial integrity of the Ukrainian people", which overlooks the status of granting Ukrainian visas to certain Russian citizens, notably those living in Eastern Ukraine and having strong ties with Russia. Many Russian politicians respond to the resolution as "Yatseniyk and Turchynov trying to prevent the breakaway of more Ukrainian regions into Russia, such as Kharkiv, Donetsk, Zaporizhzhia". Another statement is made by Turchynov regarding Crimean tatars, in which the incumbent President says that Ukraine will try to reinforce the rights of Tatars living in Crimea, which so far have been long neglected.

The Ukrainian corvettes Khmelnytskyi and Lutsk were boarded and seized by Russian forces at Streletska Bay. At evening, 15-20 Russian special troops from a Russian navy tug stormed the already damaged corvette Ternopil at Sevastopol and captured her using stun grenades and automatic fire.

=== March 21 ===
After the Federation Council approved on final reading the treaty of accession of the Crimea to the Russian Federation, Vladimir Putin ratifies the inclusion of two new areas into the Russian Federation: the Republic of Crimea and the City of Federal Importance of Sevastopol. The Crimean Federal District is created with Oleg Belaventsev being appointed as its Presidential Envoy.

At the same time Ukraine withdraws military troops from certain previously guarded areas in the Crimea and boycotts the right to travel to Simferopol for some of its airlines.

At Sevastopol, Russian warships surrounded the Ukrainian submarine Zaporizhzhia, and attacked her with grenades. The submarine was later seized by Russian personnel. At Donuzlav Bay, the Ukrainian minesweeper Cherkasy made a fruitless attempt to negotiate the scuttled vessels and gain access to open sea; after the failure, she and the landing ship Konstantin Olshansky dropped anchor and adopted a defensive formation.

=== March 22 ===
Russian forces storm two Ukrainian air bases in Crimea. At 4:00 PM local time, Ukrainian border patrol guards seal off the northern entrance from Crimea. The same evening, Sergey Aksyonov addressed the citizens of Southern and Eastern Ukraine via a YouTube video, in which he urged the population of fend off "the banderians" (referring to the Right Sector Party, which has the teachings and works of Stepan Bandera as part of its ideology and traditions) and to protect their lands from attacks from them that may arise. Outside these parts, the video was seen as an attempt by Crimea to trigger further revolts in these regions against the Kyiv government, so that further separation may ensue.

Prime Minister of Russia Dmitry Medvedev spoke on Russia Today about the nullification of the documents signed in 2010 concerning Russian gas supply through Crimea, basing his country's decision on the fact that Crimea is now a part of Russia. Medvedev then denied the change of Russian stance towards its pacts with Ukraine, only speculating that Russia has 'amended' some of the signed documents in order to remove "Crimea" from the lists.

=== March 23 ===
About 30% of Crimea and almost half of Simferopol dwellings and buildings met a power outage as Ukrainian electric company UkrEnergo shut off its supply of electricity to those regions. Belarusian President Aleksandr Lukashenko described the blackout as "ridiculous" and urged for both nations to remember their Slavic roots, as does Belarus.

So far 189 out of roughly 4000 Ukrainian military outposts personnel located in Crimea joined the Russian forces in the area post-accession. The 13th Outpost, located in Feodosiya, became famous for its marginal resistance to the Russian forces and repetitive denial to give up. The speaker of Crimean Tatar people warned the Russian government that should their national integrity be compromised (as is the case with Ukraine), they will form an insurgency movement and will "defend" the lands they live on. Russia did not respond to the warning in any way.

At Donuzlav Bay, the Ukrainian minesweeper Cherkasy made a second ill-fated attempt to pass over the scuttled ships at the bay's entrance. At night, the Russian navy scuttled a fifth ship at the mouth of the bay.

=== March 24 ===
Canada, France, Germany, Italy, Japan, the United Kingdom, and the United States voted to suspend Russia from the Group of 8. Gregor Gysi, chairman of the German "Left" Party, has expressed his discontent with this decision (which was primarily brought by Angela Merkel) and responded by giving the February coup in Ukraine as example of what would be "not less unconstitutional" than the Crimean referendum. "The fascists who came to power in Ukraine, have their own understanding of what is constitutional, and the small percent of democrats sitting in the Rada cannot seem to influence it", he said.

A tug carrying Russian forces boarded and seized the amphibious ship Konstantin Olshansky at Donuzlav Bay. Ukrainian sources claim that 200 troops assaulted the vessel with the use of automatic weapons and stun grenades. The Ukrainian ship was crewed by 20 crewmembers at the time, who laid up a smokescreen. Ukrainian sources report that the crew disabled the electronics and the engines of the vessel beyond repair before surrender.

=== March 25 ===
Russia awards a medal to former Ukrainians who assisted in the annexation of Crimea. Controversy erupts over the reverse of the medallion, which dates "the return of Crimea" as February 20 — March 18. This implies that Russia was awarding those involved with the February 20 killing of Maidan protesters. After a two-hour engagement, the Ukrainian minesweeper Cherkasy, the last warship waving the Ukrainian ensign in Crimea was disabled with explosive charges and captured at Donuzlav Bay by the ocean-going tug Kovel, three speedboats, and two Mi-35 helicopters. There were no casualties, but the vessel's rudder was crippled by the explosion of a grenade. A bloodless exchange of small arms fire was reported; the Ukrainian crew was allowed to hoist the Ukrainian flag and stay aboard until their evacuation on 26 March.

=== March 26 ===
Russian commander-in-chief general Valery Gerasimov told the press that all military facilities around Crimea were under control of Russian forces, and all military personnel who expressed loyalty to Ukraine was being evacuated from the peninsula.

=== March 27 ===
The UN General Assembly approved a resolution describing the Crimean referendum on 16 March as illegal. One hundred countries voted in favour of approving a UN General Assembly resolution declaring the Crimean referendum illegal and affirming Ukraine's territorial integrity. Eleven nations voted against, with 58 abstentions.

=== March 28 ===
Russian state media agency ITAR-TASS reported that the Ministry of Foreign Affairs contacted the Ukrainian Embassy in Moscow to inform it of Russia's unilateral termination of a number of Black Sea Fleet agreements, as well as Russia's willingness to repatriate Ukrainian military equipment left in Crimea.

=== March 29 ===
Crimea and Sevastopol switched to Moscow Time at 22:00 (10:00 PM) Eastern European Time.

== Aftermath ==
=== April 2014 ===
In Novofedorivka a Junior Sergeant of the Russian Naval Infantry identified as E. C. Zaitsev fired two shots at close distance from an AK-74, killing Ukrainian officer Major Stanislav Karachevsky who was getting ready to be relocated.

During the 12th 'Direct Line with Vladimir Putin' the use of Russian armed forces along with Crimean self-defence troops was avowed by the Russian president, but Vladimir Putin denied the claims by Ukraine and the West that Russian special forces were fomenting ongoing unrest in eastern Ukraine.

=== May 2014 ===
The Russian President's Human Rights Council "posted a blog that was quickly taken down as if it were toxic radioactive waste" estimating that a "vast majority of the citizens of Sevastopol voted in favor of unification with Russia in the referendum (50-80%); in Crimea, various data show that 50-60% voted for unification with Russia, with a turnout of 30-50%," suggesting that the official results are false. The document is still on the Russian website.

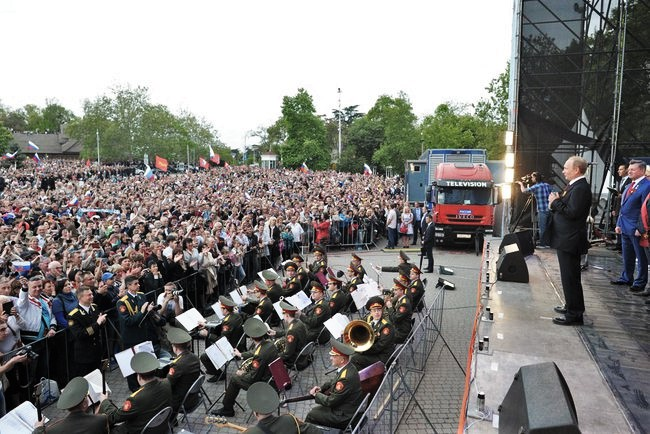
President Vladimir Putin in Crimean Sevastopol to watch Victory Day parade on 9 May 2014

=== August 2014 ===
Ukrainian border guards fend off a hostile incursion on Kherson Oblast from Crimea.

=== September 2014 ===
Russian authorities raided Crimean Tatars national assembly building, removing all staff by force. This was preceded by a court ruling that ordered blocking of the assembly bank accounts and repressions against its members and political activists.

Mustafa Djemilev announced that since March over 18 Tatar activists were missing, some of them abducted by government forces, some lost without trace. Most recent such case was Edem Asanov who disappeared on 29 September while travelling to work.

After elections in Crimea five members of Supreme Council of Ukraine resigned.

=== November 2014 ===
Human Rights Watch issued a report "Rights in Retreat" on humanitarian situation in Crimea under Russian administration, documenting "persecution of Crimean Tatars and pro-Ukrainian activists, harassment of pro-Ukraine and Crimean Tatar media and imposition of Russian citizenship in Crimea". Sergey Aksyonov rejected the report as "propaganda".

== See also ==
- Timeline of the war in Donbas
- Timeline of the Russo-Ukrainian war (2022–present)
