= Building of the Supreme Council of Crimea =

Parliament building in Simferopol, Crimea

Coordinates: 44.951669°N 34.096692°E

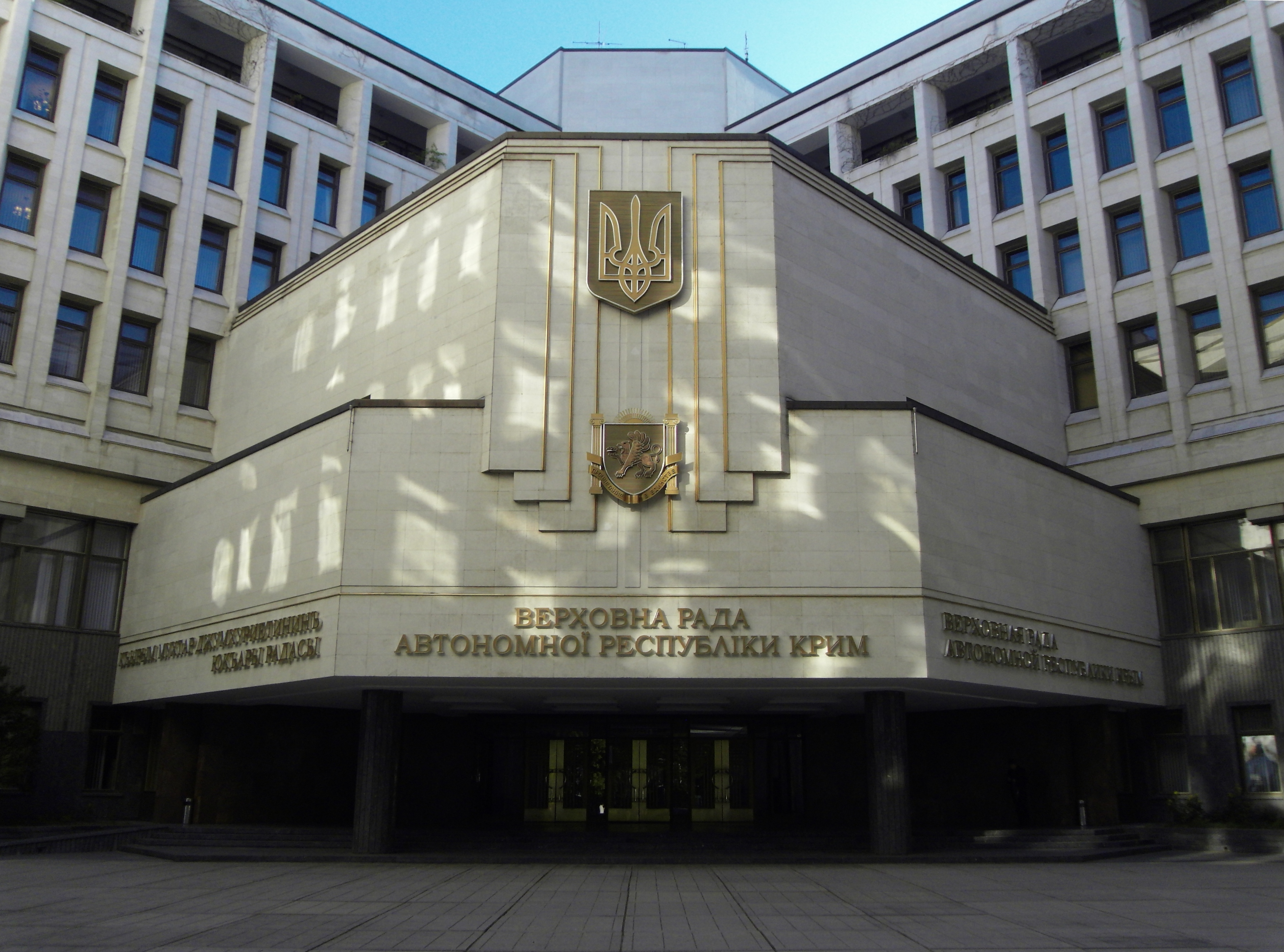
The building of the Supreme Council of Crimea in 2010

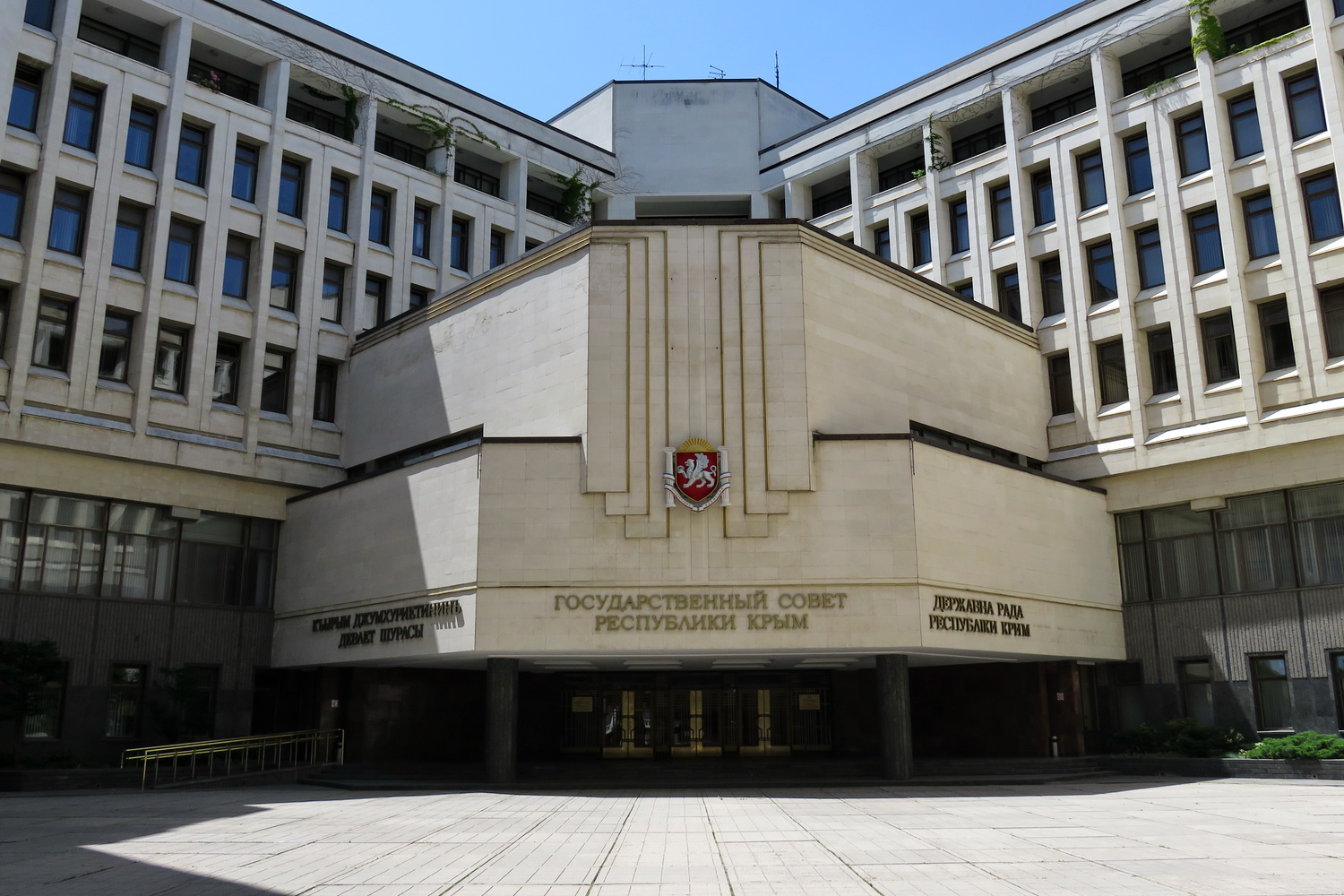
The building hosting the State Council of Crimea in 2016 after the Annexation of Crimea by the Russian Federation, having the Coat of arms of Ukraine removed and the captions being replaced.

The building of the Supreme Council of Crimea (Russian: Здание парламента Крыма; Ukrainian: Будівля Верховної Ради Автономної Республіки Крим) is an administrative building in Simferopol, Crimea. It housed the Supreme Council of the Autonomous Republic of Crimea and currently hosts the State Council of Republic of Crimea following the annexation of Crimea by the Russian Federation in 2014.

== History ==
The building was built in place of a former cinema theatre for children "Alyie Parusa" (Crimson Sails) that before 1965 carried the name "Pioneer". Before the October Revolution in 1917 here was quartered a city police complex with jail.

Before 1980 the theatrical building was liquidated and in September 1980 a construction of the new building of the Crimea regional committee of Communist Party broke ground. According to the head of construction department of the Crimea regional committee of Communist Party Yevhen Krotenko (Merited Builder of Ukraine) it was planned to place in the building the city and regional committees of the Komsomol of Ukraine (LKSMU).

For the new building was given an area of 1.8 ha (4.4 acres) at the intersection of streets Karl Marx, Gorky and Zhukovskoho. The cinema theater and several residential houses were demolished. The city executive committee headed by Mykhailo Lozovyi resettled away residents from the torn down apartments. The draft of the new regional administrative building was ordered by architects of one of the Moscow institutes T.Kurdiani, G.Isaakovich, and engineers D.Valov, S.Popkov. Construction of the building essentially a dominant of the city center was carried out by the 7th construction administration of the trust "Simferopolpromstroi" headed by Oleksandr Shvechikov.

For nearly eight years a construction fence was enclosing the area in the center of the capital. During that period the most noticed were construction brigades of Viktor Horoshchak and Maria Sheludko. Some of building materials were brought from the Mytishchi Special Factory. According to Yevhen Krotenko, during that time leaders of "Glavmoststroimaterily" Mark Zokhin and Aleksei Dementiev were very helpful.

After the fall of the Soviet Union the building was granted to the Supreme Council of Crimea.

In a military operation leading up to the annexation of Crimea by the Russian Federation, masked gunmen seized the building and raised a Russian flag.
