= Crimea attacks (2022–present) =

Part of the Russian invasion of Ukraine

- Part of the southern front during the Russo-Ukrainian war
- Crimean Peninsula
Date	31 July 2022 – present (4 years, 3 months, 2 weeks and 6 days)
Location	Crimea

Belligerents
Russia	Ukraine

Casualties and losses
Russian claim: 1 killed 19 injured 7 aircraft destroyed 3 damaged Ukrainian claim: 60 killed 100 injured 9 aircraft destroyed 4 damaged	Russian claim: 3 rockets shot down 70+ aerial drones shot down 15+ maritime drones destroyed
- 9 civilians killed 126 injured

Russia has occupied the Crimean Peninsula of Ukraine since 2014, which started the Russo-Ukrainian war. Russia used Crimea as a base from which to launch its 2022 invasion of Ukraine, specifically its offensive on Southern Ukraine and the occupation of Kherson province and Zaporizhzhia province. Ukraine has responded by attacking Russian forces and infrastructure in Crimea from July 2022, with missiles and drones. Targets include Sevastopol Naval Base (headquarters of Russia's Black Sea Fleet), air bases such as Saky and Belbek, ammunition depots, radar sites, and the Crimean Bridge. There have also been a number of amphibious landings by Ukrainian special forces.

Vladimir Putin has called Crimea a "sacred place" and a "holy land". Deputy Chairman of the Security Council of Russia Dmitry Medvedev said in July 2022 that the consequence of an attack on Crimea will be that, "the Day of Judgment will come for all of them there at once. Very fast and heavy. It will be very difficult to hide".

== Russian occupation of Crimea ==
The occupation began during Ukraine's Revolution of Dignity, which ousted pro-Russian president Viktor Yanukovych. Russian special forces, disguised as "Crimean self-defense forces", took control of Crimea's government buildings, surrounded Ukrainian military bases, and blockaded the peninsula. Russia denied involvement at the time, but Putin later admitted that they were Russian troops. A pro-Russian government was installed and a referendum on Crimea's status was held under occupation. According to the Russian-installed authorities, the result was in favour of joining Russia. Russia annexed Crimea on 18 March 2014, re-organizing it as a Russian republic and turning Sevastopol into a Russian federal city. Russia also claimed an exclusive economic zone in the Black Sea around Crimea. This zone is three times bigger than the peninsula and holds vast natural gas and oil reserves. The United Nations General Assembly adopted a resolution affirming the "territorial integrity of Ukraine within its internationally recognised borders", and the UN considers Crimea to be Russian-occupied.

== Russian invasion of 2022 ==
On 24 February 2022, Russian forces invaded mainland Ukraine from Crimea, as well as from the north and east. What had been expected to be a quick seizure of the country soon turned into a war of attrition. The newly-occupied provinces of Ukraine were administered under a Russian-controlled military-civilian administration until 30 September 2022, when the Russian government declared it had annexed them (an annexation widely regarded as illegal and unrecognized internationally).

== Weaponry ==
=== GLSDB ===
On 3 February 2023, the United States government announced an aid package for Ukraine that would include the Ground Launched Small Diameter Bomb (GLSDB), which can be launched out of existing Ukraine-operated HIMARS or MLRS launchers (or out of its own launcher) to hit Russian targets that had been moved out of GMLRS range. The GLSDB almost doubles the range that Ukraine could previously target with these launchers (150 km (93 mi) vs 85 km (53 mi) with GMLRS). This "will put all of Russia's supply lines in the east of [Ukraine] within reach, as well as part of Russian-occupied Crimea", according to Reuters. "Russia is using Crimea as a big military base from which it sends reinforcements for its troops on the southern front," said Ukrainian military analyst Oleksandr Musiyenko. "If we had a 150km (munition), we could reach that and disrupt the logistical connection with Crimea." It has been speculated that the GLSDB might allow Ukraine to target the Dzhankoi airfield in northern Crimea, described as the logistics hub of the Russian army. Dzhankoi is a critical rail and road hub in the supply network Russia has been using in its attack on Ukraine and, along with its surrounding areas, has been described as the largest Russian military base in Crimea. Ukraine holds the territory across the Dnieper River from Nova Kakhovka (close to where the North Crimean Canal begins). The distance between Nova Kakhovka and Dzhankoi is 141 km (88 mi). It has also been estimated that if Ukraine were able to advance to Prymorsk on their southern coast, this would put the Crimean Bridge over the Kerch Strait within range of the GLSDB. This bridge constitutes the main supply route for Russian military bases in Crimea and for Russian forces in southern Ukraine.

=== Storm Shadow Missiles ===
On 11 May 2023 it was announced that the U.K. was sending "a number" of Storm Shadow air-launched cruise missiles to Ukraine. This weapon has an official range "exceeding" 250 km (160 mi). While this falls short of the 300 km (190 mi) range of the U.S. made ATACMS, it would allow a Storm Shadow missile fired by Ukraine from an aircraft flying above the city of Kherson to reach Russia's Sevastopol Naval Base in southern Crimea, home of Russia's Black Sea Fleet (distance 245 km (152 mi)).

== Targets of attack ==
=== Landings ===
On 24 August 2023, the 32nd anniversary of Ukraine's Independence Day, the HUR announced that Air Force and Navy intelligence were involved in a special operation near the towns of Mayak and Olenivka on the Tarkhankut Peninsula, which saw a seaborne landing and airborne deployment of Ukrainian personnel on Crimea. The HUR announced that all objectives of the operation were completed, Russian forces suffered casualties, and that the Ukrainian state flag was once again flown over the Crimean peninsula.

=== Crimean Bridge ===
Collapsed section of the Crimean Bridge after the November 2026 attack

On 1 October, there were explosions at the Belbek military airport near Sevastopol, the air defense system allegedly shot down a drone in the area. On 8 October at around 6:00 am, an explosion occurred on the Crimean bridge. It caused two lanes of the roadway to collapse and tanks on a train on the rail bridge to catch fire. Later in the day a single lane for motor vehicles was opened with alternating directions and a ferry provided for heavy goods vehicles. Rail traffic also recommenced. The attack on the bridge was claimed by Putin to be the reason for the October 2022 missile strikes on Ukraine. On 27 October, a power plant in Balaklava, Sevastopol region, reportedly attacked, causing minor damage, no casualties were reported.

On 17 July 2023, the Crimean Bridge linking Crimea with mainland Russia was again attacked, this time by two exploding drone boats. At least one of the road sections collapsed. Two people were reportedly killed. Ukraine later acknowledged it carried out the attack.

On 3 June 2025, the Crimean Bridge was temporarily closed and subsequently reopened by Russian authorities after several underwater C-4 explosives planted under the bridge detonated. The Security Service of Ukraine claimed responsibility, saying its agents planted 1,100 kg (1.1 t) of TNT equivalent at a support section of the bridge.

=== Port of Sevastopol ===
Headquarters of the Black Sea Fleet

On the morning of 31 July 2022, a drone with an explosive device attacked the headquarters of the Black Sea Fleet in Sevastopol. Six people were injured. Due to the attack on the city, all festivities on the occasion of the Navy Day were cancelled. Ukrainian officials denied involvement in the attack, but pointed out the weakness of Russia's air defense system in Crimea.

On the morning of 21 August, explosions were heard in Sevastopol, Crimean authorities claimed that it was the work of air defense. On the next day, explosions rang out again in the city, the occupation authorities announced that a drone had been shot down. On 23 August, several explosions were heard, the anti-aircraft missile system also went off near the city, the governor of Sevastopol, Mikhail Razvozhayev, said that a drone was shot down over the sea. On 26 August, the anti-aircraft defense system was activated in the village Novoozerne near Yevpatoria.

On 21 September, a maritime drone was discovered on Soldatsky Beach in Kozacha Bay, Sevastopol. It was examined, then towed out to sea and blown up.

On 29 October, the Russian-occupied Sevastopol Naval Base was attacked by unmanned surface vehicles and aerial drones. According to the Russian TASS, at 4:20 am on 29 October, a strong explosion sounded, after which several more "claps" were heard. Videos began to circulate in Telegram channels showing black smoke over Sevastopol and explosions could be heard. Nine UAVs and seven USVs took part in the attack, according to Russian officials. GeoConfirmed analysts believe that between six and eight drones participated in the attack on Russian ships and that they hit at least three ships; two naval drones were most likely destroyed. One of the ships that appeared to be damaged in videos was the Admiral Makarov, Russia's Black Sea Fleet new flagship, following the sinking of the Moskva.

Following the attacks the Russian authorities shut down broadcast from the city's surveillance cameras, saying that they "give the enemy an opportunity to detect the city's defense systems", and prohibited entry of boats into the Sevastopol Bay. Russia accused Ukraine and the United Kingdom of being involved in the preparation of the attacks, with Russian representatives saying that the attack was "carried out under the leadership of British specialists who are in the city of Ochakiv (Mykolaiv region) of Ukraine", Russian authorities also claimed that the same unit of "British specialists" was involved in the "terrorist act in the Baltic Sea", when the gas pipelines "Nord Stream" and "Nord Stream – 2" were blown up. The UK Ministry of Defence responded, saying Russia was "peddling lies on an epic scale". After the attack, Russia suspended its participation in the Black Sea Grain Initiative for four days. Grain ships continued to sail from Ukraine despite the Russian announcement. Before these events, Ukraine had warned about possible Russian plans to withdraw from the agreement.

On 22 November, several explosions were reported on Sevastopol, witnesses reported that anti-air systems activated, maritime traffic had to be stopped as a result. local officials later reported that two drones had been destroyed during the alleged attack, and that another attack had been repelled over the Black Sea, no casualties or significant damage were reported.

On 10 December, explosions were reported in Sevastopol, and anti-air systems reportedly activated. On 30 December, explosions were reported yet again in Sevastopol, anti-air systems and Russian planes reportedly intercepted a rocket over the sea.

On 2 January 2023, explosions were reported in Sevastopol, anti-air systems activated and two drone were reportedly destroyed over the sea, according to Russian authorities. On 15 January, more explosions were reported in Sevastopol, anti-air systems activated and allegedly destroyed one drone above the Sevastopol Bay, according to local authorities.

On 22 March, explosions were reported overnight in Sevastopol Bay, electricity allegedly went down as a result of these explosions, civilians reported hearing several "shots" and explosions over the bay during the night and morning, it was alleged that these loud sounds were the result of a drone attack, local telegram channels reported possible attack by UAVs and USVs, with one UAV allegedly downed; maritime traffic was interrupted after the alleged attack.

On 25 August, the Ukrainian military and the SBU launched a joint drone strike on the 126th Coastal Defence Brigade of the Russian Black Sea Fleet in Perevalne, reportedly inflicting "dozens" of casualties.

On 13 September, a Ukrainian strike on Russia's Sevastopol Naval Base damaged two Russian warships. According to a number of sources, the strike was carried out using Storm Shadow cruise missiles, which are designed to penetrate deeply into their targets and inflict maximum damage in a two-phase process. Experts have concluded from photographs that the Minsk, a large Ropucha-class landing ship, was damaged beyond repair. Also damaged was the Rostov-on-Don, a $300M Kilo-class submarine.

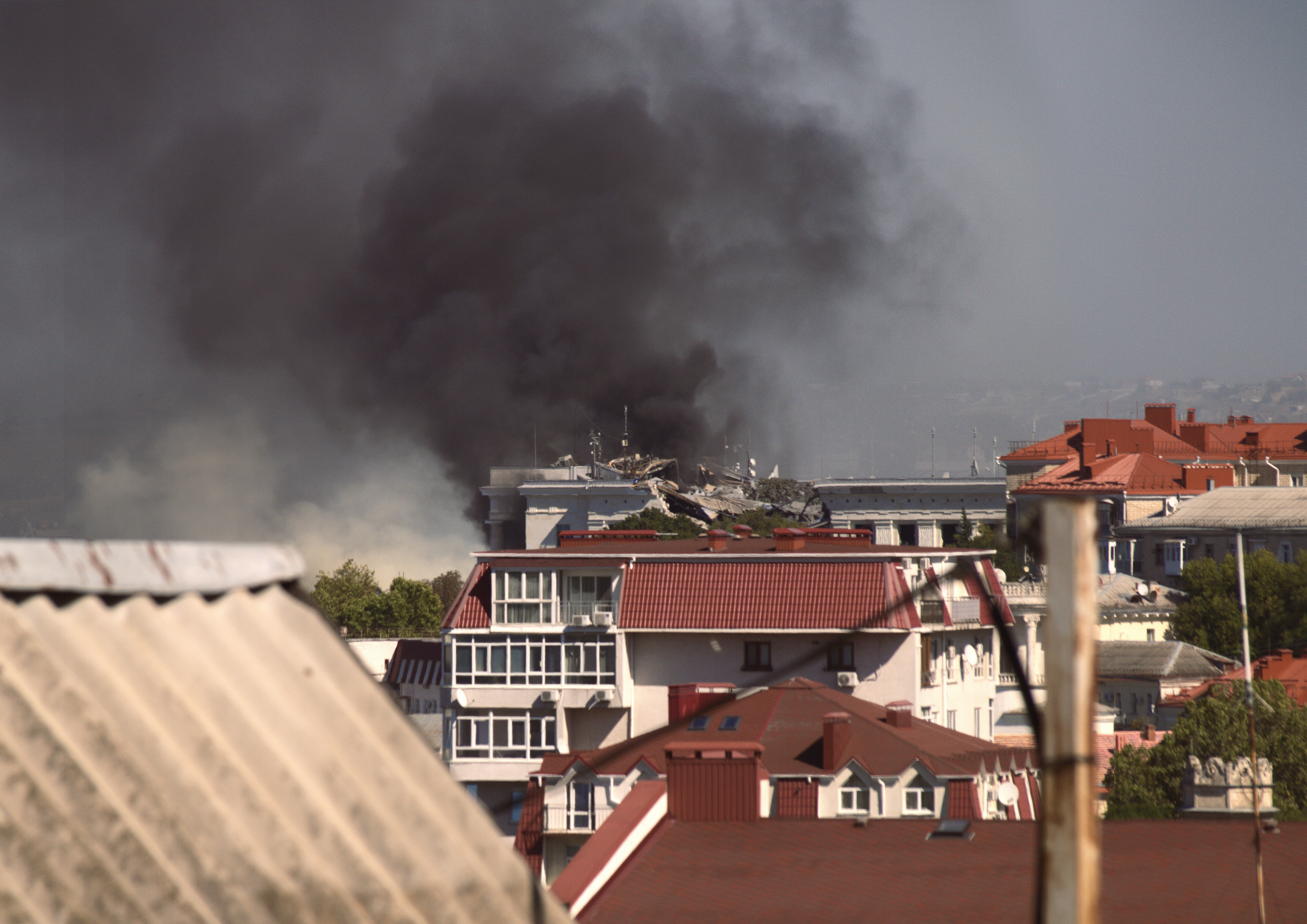
Aftermath of Ukrainian missile strike on the Russian Black Sea Fleet headquarters

On 22 September, Ukraine launched a missile strike on the headquarters of the Russian Black Sea Fleet at Sevastopol Naval Base. The building was reportedly struck by Storm Shadow cruise missiles. Ukraine's intelligence agencies reported that the strike, which it codenamed "Operation Crab Trap", killed 34 officers and wounded at least 100 other Russian servicemen. Three days later, Russian authorities announced that they would demolish the damaged headquarters of the Black Sea Fleet.

On 29 December, a Russian Tarantul-class corvette was struck by a Ukrainian drone whilst in harbour at Sevastopol. On 20 January 2024, satellite images confirmed its sinking.

On 23 March 2024, the Ukrainian military launched a "massive" missile attack on Sevastopol Naval Base. A Black Sea Fleet communications center was struck by three Storm Shadow missiles. Ukraine's military said the strikes damaged three Russian landing ships: the Yamal, the Azov, and the Konstantin Olshansky. The spy ship Ivan Khurs was also reportedly damaged.

On 23 June, Ukraine launched an ATACMS missile bombardment towards Sevastopol. Missile fragments hit a beach, killing four people and injuring 151 others. Russia held the United States responsible and vowed that there will be a response.

On 20 February 2026, one person was killed and several buildings were damaged by Ukrainian drone strikes in Sevastopol, Crimea.

=== Airbases ===
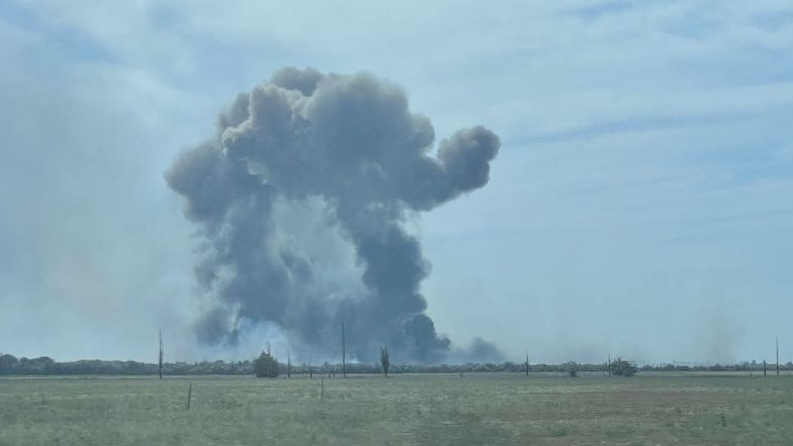
Smoke from the August 2022 Saky airbase attack

On 9 August 2022, a series of large explosions occurred at the Saky airbase in the city of Novofedorivka, Crimea. Reportedly, one person was killed and 13 were injured. Seven planes were destroyed and three were damaged, according to satellite imagery. The military base had been seized by Russian forces during the 2014 annexation of Crimea. At first Ukraine denied any responsibility with presidential aide, Mykhailo Podolyak saying "Of course not. What do we have to do with this?" Later, the commander of Ukrainian forces, Valeriy Zaluzhnyi claimed that it had been a Ukrainian rocket attack.

On 6 January 2024, the Ukrainian Air Force said it had destroyed a Russian command center at Saky airbase.

On 31 January 2024, 31 the Ukrainian Air Force said it launched a missile strike on Belbek airbase, damaging three Russian military aircraft.

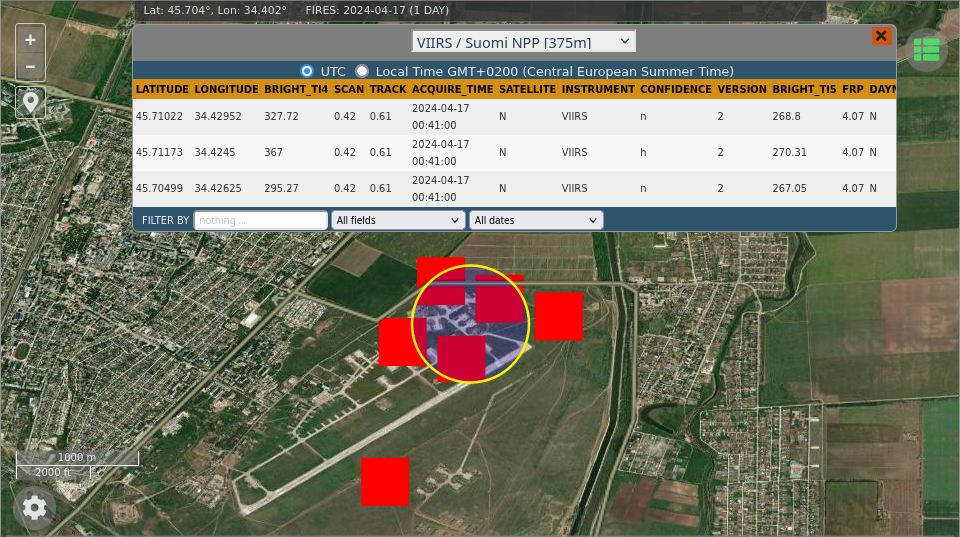
NASA's FIRMS imagery from 17 April 00:41:00 (UTC) showing six fires at Dzhankoi air base

On April 17, Ukrainian missiles struck Dzhankoi airbase in Crimea causing at least six explosions and multiple secondary explosions to be reported by locals while NASA FIRMS imagery showed six fires there. Subsequent satellite pictures showed the destruction of three to five S-300/S-400 components and other areas marked with "scorch marks" that suggested equipment that had been damaged but removed. Ukraine subsequently released footage of multiple missiles being launched at the air base.

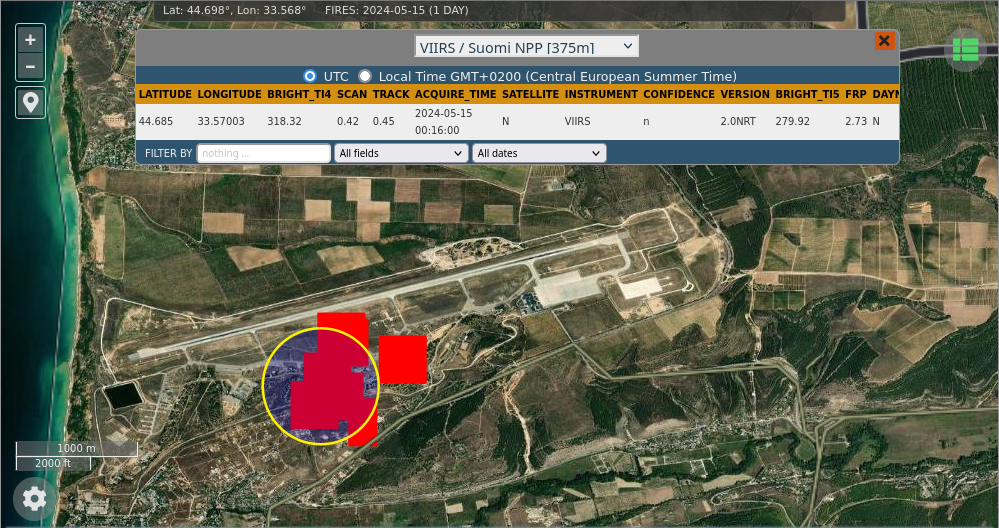
NASA's FIRMS imagery from 15 May 00:16:00 (UTC) showing fires at Belbek Air Base

In the early hours of the 15 May, Ukraine launched a missile strike against Belbek airbase reportedly destroying two MiG-31 fighter jets on the ground, igniting a fire at a fuel and lubricant depot serving the airbase and wounding 11 soldiers. A subsequent strike then destroyed the launcher component of an S-400 air defence system near the village of Vyshneve (about 70 km from Belbek) killing two Russian soldiers. The Russian-appointed Governor of Sevastopol Mikhail Razvozhayev stated that American-made ATACMS missiles were used in the strike but said that all missiles were successfully intercepted by Russian air defences.

=== Ammunition depots and logistical hubs ===
On 16–17 August 2022, the Armed Forces of Ukraine allegedly carried out a series of acts of sabotage in the Dzhankoi district at an ammunition depot near the village of Majskoye and at an electricity substation in Dzhankoi itself. Two people were injured. According to the mayor of Melitopol, Ivan Fedorov, following the explosions, the occupying authorities of Crimea began an evacuation. with around 2,000 people being reportedly evacuated. Sergey Aksyonov, one of the heads of the Russian authorities in crimea, announced the containment of a zone with a radius of 5 km from the epicenter of the explosion and the evacuation of the population from this zone.

On 20 March 2023, Ukraine's Ministry of Defense stated that Russian "Kalibr-KN" cruise missiles being transported by train in Dzhankoi were destroyed in a missile strike in Russian-occupied Crimea, the attack also severely damaged the railway system in the region. The Russian-installed head of Crimea, Sergei Aksyonov, confirmed there was a strike and the region's air defense system was activated. Oleg Kryuchkov, an adviser to Aksyonov, claimed that the drone attack was aimed at civilian targets. Local authorities declared a state of emergency after the attack.

On 22 June, a Ukrainian missile damaged the Chonhar bridge, an important road bridge linking Crimea to the Ukrainian mainland.

On 19 July, there was a fire and numerous explosions at a Russian ammunition depot near Staryi Krym, forcing the evacuation of four villages and the closure of the nearby Tavrida Highway. There were unconfirmed reports that it was caused by Ukrainian strikes. Three days later, another Russian ammunition depot was struck by drones in Krasnohvardiiske Raion, forcing the evacuation of a five-kilometer radius.

On 28 July, Ukraine's intelligence agency said that saboteurs blew up an ammunition warehouse at Kozacha Bay, the headquarters of the Russian 810th Guards Naval Infantry Brigade.

=== Russian air defense ===
On 23 August, the Ukrainian military destroyed a Russian S-400 missile system on Cape Tarkhankut, Crimea. A modified R-360 Neptune missile was used in the strike. It is reported that several Russian military personnel were killed.

On 30 October, Ukraine claimed to have destroyed Russian air defense systems in a missile attack on Crimea. Russian milbloggers said that two missiles fell near Olenivka. The attack was believed to have targeted an S-300 missile battery, and injured about 17 Russian soldiers.

=== Russian oil facilities ===
Ukrainian forces likely attacked an oil storage facility in Kozacha Bay, Sevastopol on 29 April 2023. The resulting fire was said by occupation governor of Sevastopol Mikhail Razvozhaev to have extended over 1,000 square meters. Footage showed a large fire at the storage facility. The Ukraine military warned that this was a prelude to a much-anticipated spring offensive.

A Ukrainian exploding drone boat severely damaged the Russian tanker Sig in the Kerch Strait on 5 August. On 5 August 2023, the tanker was reported to have been the target of a naval drone attack by Ukrainian forces in the Black Sea 17 kilometres (11 mi) south of the Crimean Bridge which damaged the engine room on the starboard side.

On 11 September 2023, Ukrainian military intelligence said that Ukrainian special forces had captured several oil and gas drilling platforms off the western Crimean coast, which had been occupied and fortified by Russia since 2015. Among the facilities retaken were the Boyko Towers and the 'Tavryda' and 'Syvash' mobile rigs. According to Ukrainian sources, a Russian Su-30 fighter jet tried to sink the Ukrainian assault boats, but was struck by a Ukrainian MANPAD, forcing it to withdraw. Ukrainian forces also seized ammunition and a radar system from the platforms.

Russia claimed to have shot down 35 Ukrainian drones over Crimea on 5 December. Ukrainian media reported that an oil terminal in Feodosia, a Nebo-M radar system near Baherove, as well as a Russian military helicopter yard, a radar complex, and an anti-aircraft missile control system were damaged in the attacks.

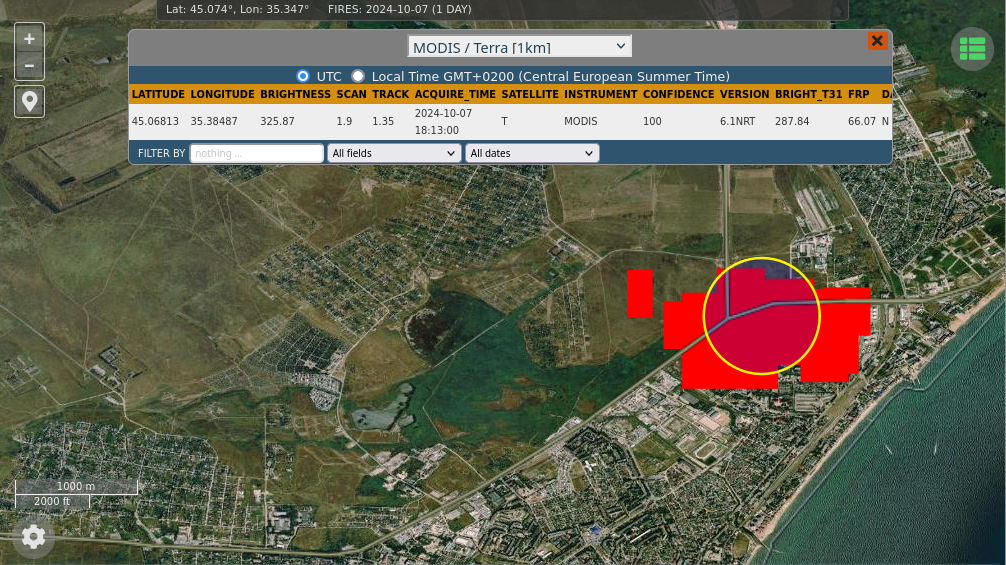
The October 7 fire in Feodosia detected by NASA's FIRMS

On 7 October, Ukraine launched a drone attack against a fuel depot in Feodosia causing explosions and fire detected by NASA's FIRMS.

=== Unclear targets ===
On 7 September 2022, several explosions rang out in Yevpatoria. The occupation authorities of the Russian Federation in the region announced the activation of air defense and the destruction of several drones.

On 26 September, a series of explosions occurred in Yalta, Gurzuf and Simferopol, anti-air systems allegedly went off during the explosions.

On 3 January 2023, explosions were reported again in Dzhankoi, anti-air systems reportedly activated, witnesses also reported the destruction of some type of "target".

On 4 March, explosions were heard in the occupied Simferopol district. A drone was reportedly downed over the village of Hvardiiske, there was no official confirmation of the reports by local authorities.

On 7 October, missile strikes were reported in Dzhankoi, Yevpatoriya and Krasnoperekopsk.

On 4 January 2024, Ukraine said it had hit two Russian military targets in Crimea.

=== Others ===
Satellite images taken on 25 April 2023 of a Russian military base in Medvedivka, Dzhankoi District, showed that armoured vehicles and artillery present in this area in October 2022 and in January 2023 were no longer present. Experts have surmised that this may be related to defensive operations ahead of an expected Ukrainian counteroffensive.

On 4 November, Ukraine launched a missile strike on the Zalyv Shipbuilding yard in Kerch, Crimea, hitting a dry dock and reportedly damaging the Russian cruise missile carrier Askold.

On 10 November, Ukrainian military intelligence said one Russian Serna-class landing craft and one Ondatra-class craft were sunk by drone boats in Vuzka Bay, Crimea.

On 1 February 2024, Ukrainian sea drones sunk the Russian missile corvette Ivanovets in Donuzlav Bay, on the west coast of Crimea.

On 5 March, the Russian patrol ship Sergey Kotov, along with an on-board helicopter, was sunk by Ukrainian naval drones near the Kerch Strait. The HUR said that seven Russian crewmen were killed. The Crimean bridge was closed to traffic due to Ukrainian air drones and sea drones attacking Kerch.

== See also ==
- Attacks in Russia during the Russo-Ukrainian war (2022–present)
- 2022 Kherson counteroffensive
- History of Crimea
- Timeline of the Russo-Ukrainian war (2022–present)
- 2023 Ukrainian counteroffensive
