= Uiutne, Saky Raion =

Uiutne Уютне (Ukrainian) Уютное (Russian) Otar Moynaq (Crimean Tatar) Отар Мойнакъ (Crimean Tatar)
- Village
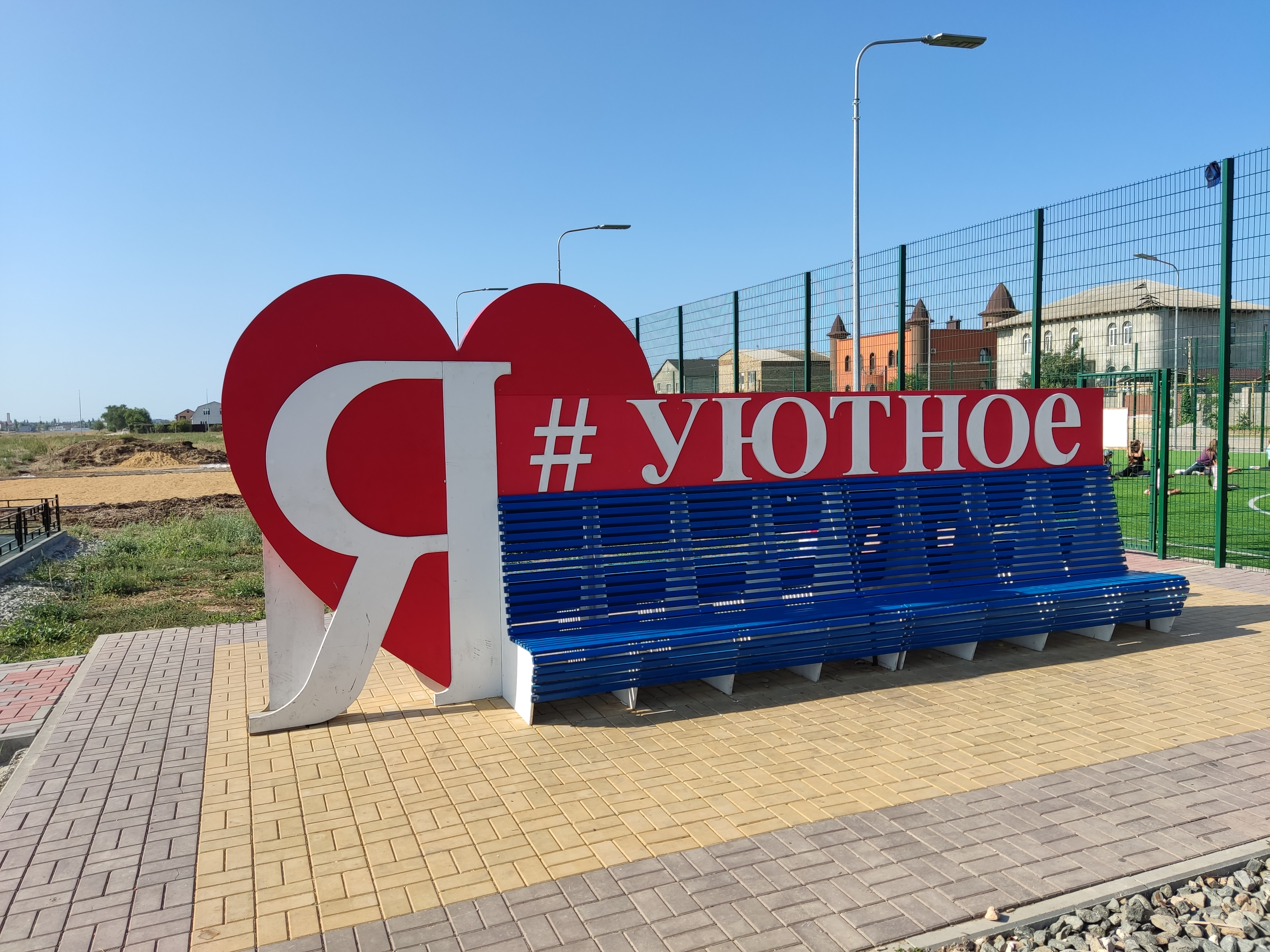
- Interactive map of Uiutne
- Location of Uiutne within Ukraine
- Coordinates: 45.198611°N 33.3°E
- Country (de jure)^{1}: Ukraine
- Region: Autonomous Republic of Crimea
- District: Saky Raion

Population (2001 census)
  - Total: 3,853
- Time zone: UTC+2 (EET)
  - Summer (DST): UTC+3 (EEST)
- Postal code: 96555
- Area code: +380 6563

Uiutne (Ukrainian: Уютне; Russian: Уютное) is a village in Saky Raion (district) in the Autonomous Republic of Crimea, on the western coast of Crimea.
