= Nizinnoye =

Nizinnoye (Russian: Низинное) is the name of several rural localities in Russia:

- Nizinnoye, Amur Oblast, a selo under the administrative jurisdiction of Belogorsk Urban Okrug in Amur Oblast
- Nizinnoye, Dzhankoysky District, Crimea, a selo in Dzhankoysky District of the Republic of Crimea
- Nizinnoye, Saksky District, Crimea, a selo in Saksky District of the Republic of Crimea
