= Heroiske =

Heroiske (Ukrainian: Геройське) may refer to the following places in Ukraine:

- Heroiske, Crimea, village in Saky Raion
- Heroiske, Kherson Oblast, village in Skadovsk Raion
