= Shore-based test facility =

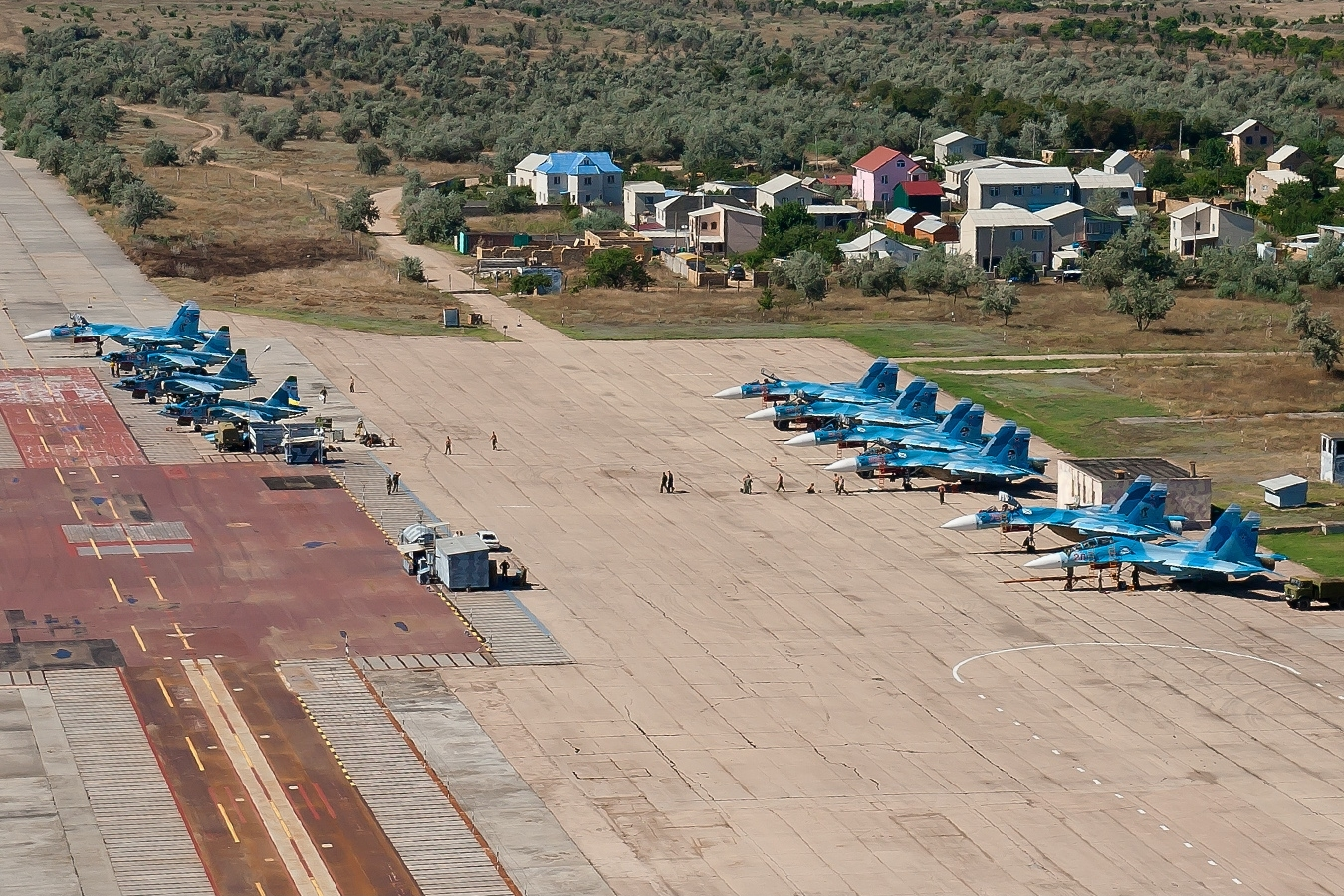
Russian Naval Aviation Sukhoi Su-33 aircraft at Saky (air base) in Novofedorovka.

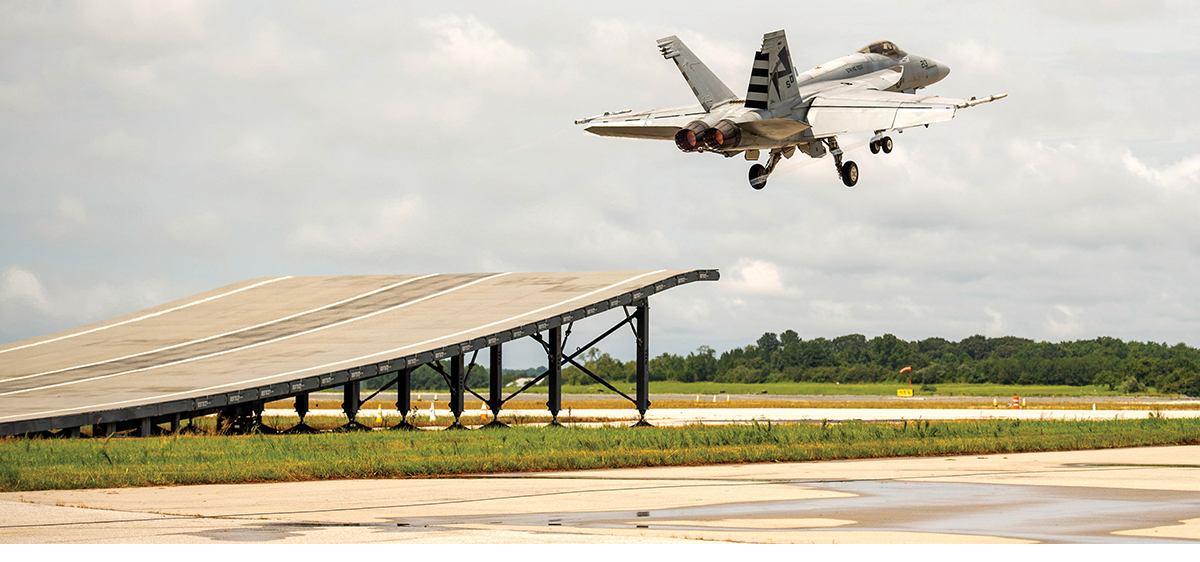
US Navy Boeing F/A-18 E/F Super Hornet takes-off from the Shore Based Test Facility during testing for the Indian Navy.

A shore-based test facility (SBTF), also known as a land-based test facility, is used for the flight testing of aircraft that operate from aircraft carriers. They are also used for the training of the pilots who will operate the aircraft from the aircraft carriers. Only four countries in the world have SBTF or LBTF; they are China, India, Ukraine / Russia and the United States.

== China ==
China's People's Liberation Army Navy has two test centers, one at Wuhan and one at Huludao.

== India ==
The Indian Navy's SBTF is located at INS Hansa in Goa, and is used to train and certify navy pilots of the Mikoyan MiG-29K for the aircraft carrier INS Vikramaditya, and for the developmental trials of the naval HAL Tejas. This SBTF was designed by Nevskoye Design Bureau (NDB) of Russia for Aeronautical Development Agency (ADA). The ski-jump resembles part of a parabola and has an inclination of 14 degrees. The highest point of the ski-jump is at 5.71 metres from the ground.

== Ukraine ==
The Ukrainian Navy inherited a former Soviet Naval Aviation base at Novofedorivka. This base now hosts the Nitka Naval Pilot Training Center, which is used by the Russian Navy to train their carrier pilots. This base, being in Crimea, is now in Russian control.

== United States ==
The United States Navy has been testing the new Electromagnetic Aircraft Launch System from the land based launch facility at Joint Base McGuire-Dix-Lakehurst.
