= Dmytro Matviyenko =

Ukrainian footballer

Personal information
- Full name: Dmytro Oleksandrovych Matviyenko
- Date of birth: 25 May 1992 (age 34)
- Place of birth: Saky, AR Crimea, Ukraine
- Height: 1.81 m (5 ft 11 in)
- Position: Right back

Youth career
- 2005–2008: Olimpik Donetsk
- 2008–2009: Shakhtar Donetsk

Senior career*
Years	Team	Apps	(Gls)
2009–2010	Olimpik Donetsk	11	(0)
2010–2014	Tavriya Simferopol	11	(0)
2014	Tiraspol	6	(0)
2015	Dynamo Saky (amateurs)		
2015–2018	Yevpatoriya	80	(16)
2018–2023	Sevastopol	83	(19)
- * Club domestic league appearances and goals as of 14 October 2021

Dmytro Matviyenko (Ukrainian: Дмитро Олександрович Матвієнко); Dmitriy Matviyenko (Russian: Дми́трий Алекса́ндрович Матвие́нко; born 25 May 1992) is a Ukrainian (until 2014), Russian football defender.

== Career ==
Matviyanko was born in Saky where at the age of 6 he started attending the local sportive youth school. Matviyenko made his debut for Tavriya Simferopol against Metalurh Zaporizhzhia on 9 March 2013 in the Ukrainian Premier League.

== Personal life ==
His younger brother Mykola Matviyenko is also a professional footballer and plays for Ukrainian Premier League club Shakhtar Donetsk and Ukraine national football team. In 2014, after the annexation of Saky to Russia he received Russian citizenship with the Russian name Dmitriy Matviyenko.
