= Heroiske, Crimea =

Heroiske
- Village
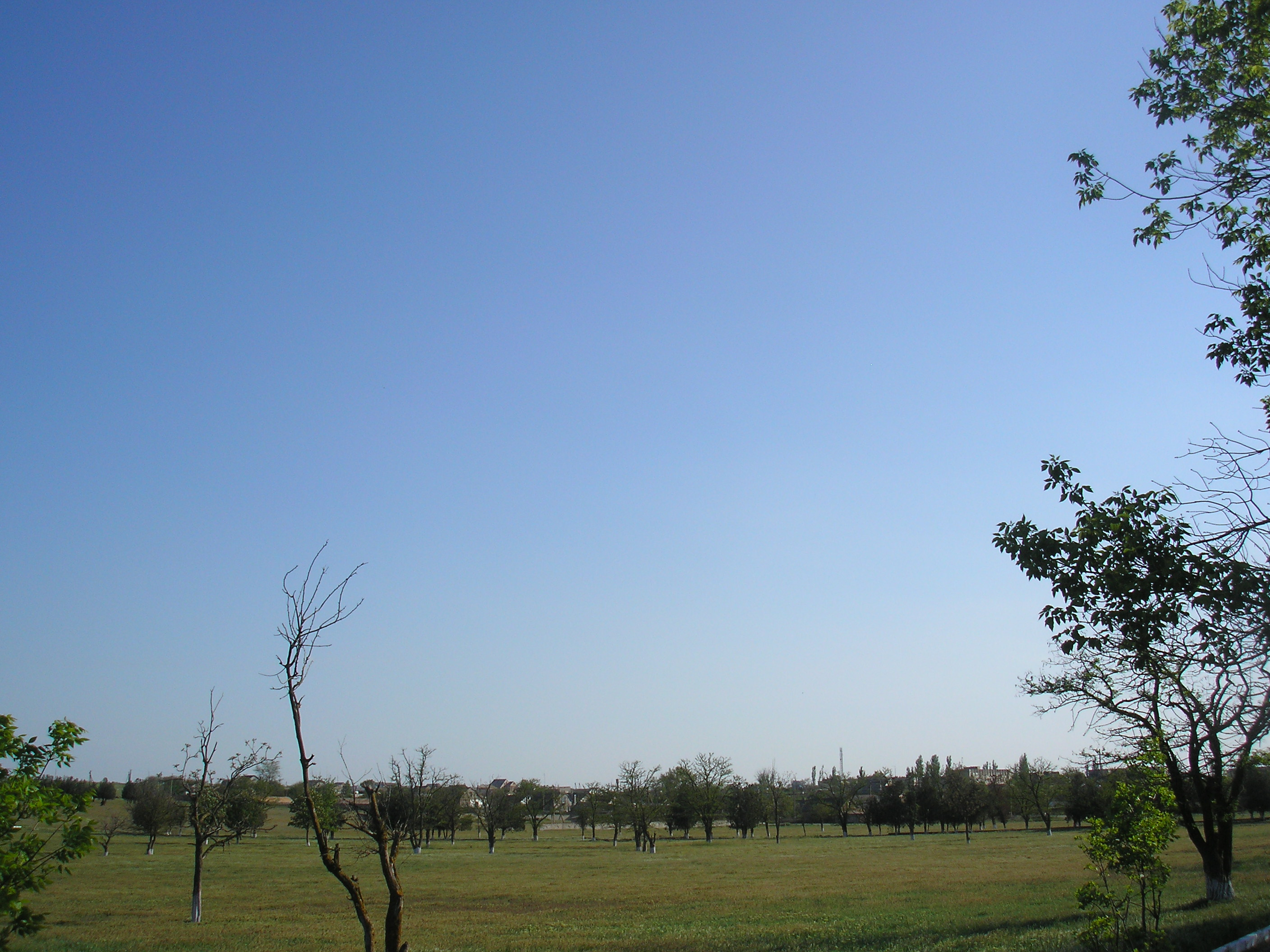

- Location within Ukraine Location within Crimea
- Coordinates: 45°08′22″N 33°44′24″E
- Country: Ukraine
- Region: AR Crimea
- Municipality: Saky
- Elevation: 28 m (92 ft)

Population
  - Total: 1,740
- Time zone: UTC+4 (MSK)
- ^{1} Autonomous Republic of Crimea (de jure) or Republic of Crimea (de facto), depending on jurisdiction.

Heroiske (Ukrainian: Геройське; Crimean Tatar: Aşağı Camin; Russian: Геройское) is a village located in Saky Raion, Crimea. Population: 1,740 (2014 Census).

== See also ==
- Saky Raion
