= 2022 Saky air base attack =

Part of the Crimea attacks

- Part of the Crimea attacks (2022–present) during the Russian invasion of Ukraine
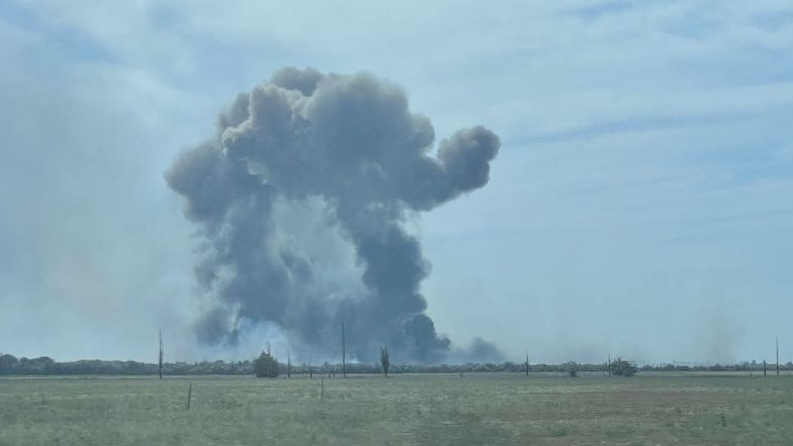
- Smoke rising from Saky airbase on 9 August 2022
Date	9 August 2022
Location	Novofedorivka, AR Crimea, Ukraine (occupied by Russia) 45°05′33″N 33°35′13″E
Result	At least 10 Russian military aircraft destroyed or damaged

Belligerents
Russia	Ukraine

Casualties and losses
According to independent observers: At least 7 military aircraft destroyed and 3–4 damaged; According to the MoD of the Russian Federation: One person died, but the equipment completely survived.	None

The 2022 Saky air base attack was an event during the Russian invasion of Ukraine, when several large explosions occurred at the Saky airbase in the town of Novofedorivka, Crimea, on 9 August 2022. The military base was seized by Russian forces during the 2014 annexation of Crimea, part of the Russo-Ukrainian War. The explosions destroyed a number of Russian warplanes and caused substantial other damage. Ukrainian authorities tacitly took responsibility at first, until four weeks after the event, when Valerii Zaluzhnyi, Ukraine's military commander, explicitly said that it had been a Ukrainian missile strike.

The Saky airbase was also struck on 21 September 2023.

== Events ==
A series of explosions occurred at Saky airbase on 9 August 2022. Initial reports were of four explosions. Later reports were of six or seven explosions, then up to 15, with reports that it sounded like ammunition detonating.

Russian authorities declared a state of emergency and yellow-alert level of terrorist threat, but claimed the explosions were the result of an accident, and said one person was killed, over a dozen injured, and 252 residents moved to temporary shelter due to damage to apartment blocks. On 10 August, the occupying authorities in Crimea announced that the number of people injured had increased to 13, and one person had died. On 12 August 2022, Anton Herashchenko, an advisor to Ukraine's Minister of Internal Affairs Denys Monastyrsky, claimed that 60 pilots and technicians had been killed and 100 people wounded in the explosions.

Ukrainian authorities did not explicitly take responsibility for the attack initially, but the General Staff of the Armed Forces said on 10 August that they had destroyed nine Russian planes in the preceding 24 hours. The Ukrainian Air Force said that 9 Russian aircraft were destroyed at the airbase.

Satellite images of the airbase before and after the explosions were released by Planet Labs on 10 August. The images showed significant damage to the base, with at least four large craters of similar size. (Note: Some reports count only three of the craters.)

== Outcomes ==
The satellite images revealed at least eight aircraft, including Su-24 and Su-30, destroyed on the apron. According to Oryx group researchers, the images showed the losses as:

- 5 Su-24
- 3 Su-30SM
- 2 Su-24 damaged
- 1 Su-30SM damaged

According to the non-governmental Ukrainian Military Center:

- 4 Su-24
- 3 Su-30SM
- 3 Su-24s damaged
- 1 Su-30SM damaged

Of civil infrastructure, 62 high-rise buildings, 20 commercial facilities, and private houses were damaged. Many tourists left Crimea for Russia, and a Russian state media tourism website boasted of a record number of cars crossing the Crimean Bridge on 15 August.

== Cause ==
Shortly after the explosions, a senior Ukrainian military official said anonymously that Ukraine was responsible. The official would not say what type of weapon was used, but that it was "a device exclusively of Ukrainian manufacture".

Within a day of the explosions, a senior Ukrainian military official said anonymously that special forces and partisans were responsible. Former military operatives and analysts said that it was unlikely that individuals on the ground carried out the attack. According to Chuck Pfarrer, former squadron leader of SEAL Team Six, "The craters visible in satellite photos are 10 meters across ... each is consistent with the explosion of at least 500 pounds of C4. No Special Forces team is going to drag a ton of C4 to a target when two ounces would be sufficient to destroy an aircraft".

Commentators speculated about various possible causes, with some assuming Ukraine had fired the American-made MGM-140 ATACMS missile, despite the claim that the weapon used was Ukrainian made, and despite U.S. denials that they had supplied ATACMS to Ukraine. There was speculation that Ukraine fired the Hrim-2 ballistic missile, which they had been developing for years, but many doubted it was ready for use or had a suitable GPS guidance system. Another possibility was the Ukrainian-made R-360 Neptune anti-ship cruise missile, but there were doubts about its accuracy in land-based targeting, plus the fact that a relatively slow moving cruise missile would probably have been observed, which did not happen. Some commentators suggested small loitering munitions, relying on their small warheads setting off large secondary explosions by hitting stored fuel or munitions.

On 7 September 2022, Ukrainian commander-in-chief Valerii Zaluzhnyi said that it had been a missile strike by Ukraine.
