= Saky =

Town in Crimea

Saky Саки Saq
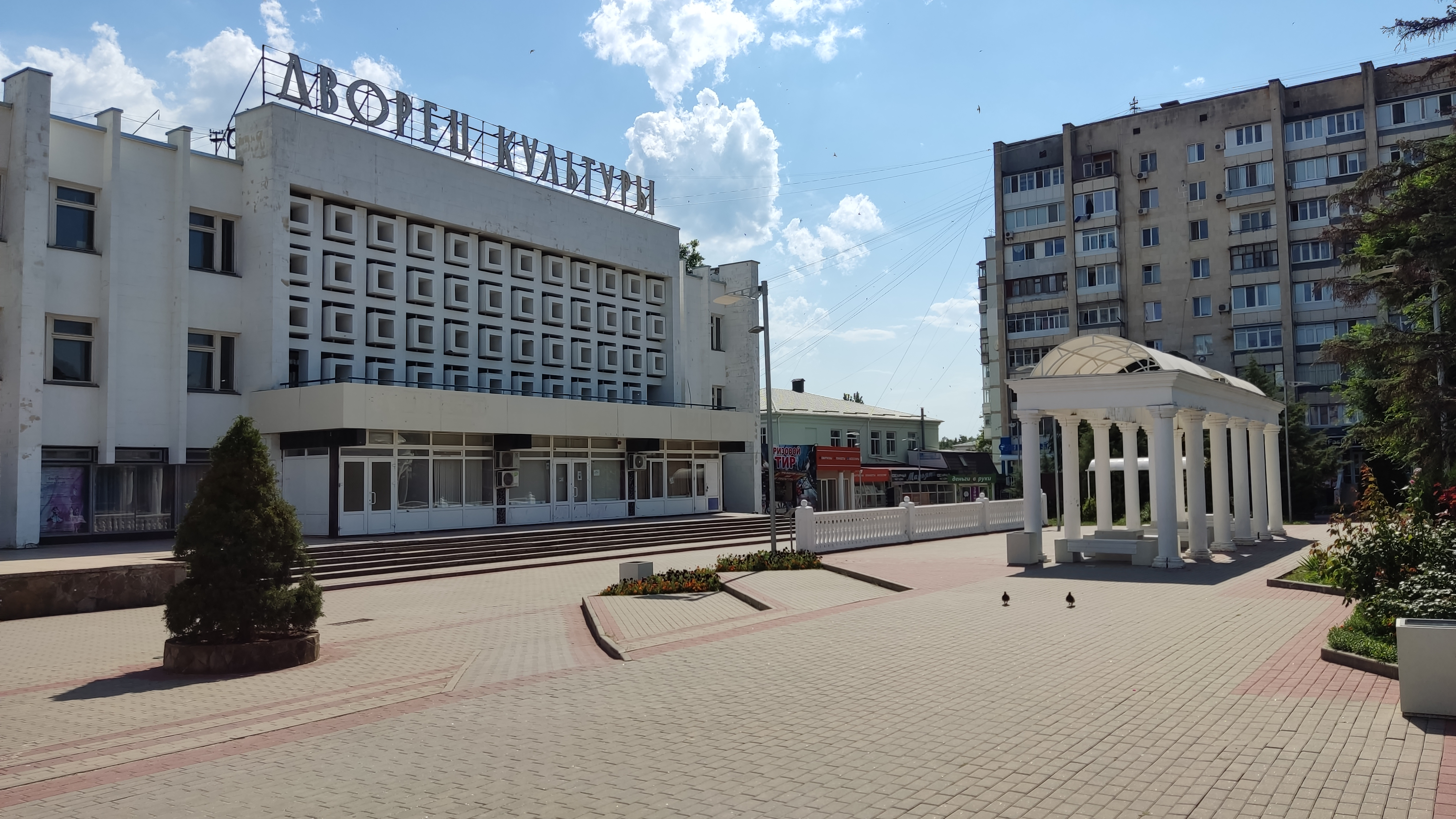

- Flag Coat of arms
- Interactive map of Saky
- Location of Saky within Crimea
- Coordinates: 45°8′1″N 33°34′38″E
- Country: Ukraine (occupied by Russia)
- Autonomous republic: Crimea (de jure)
- Raion: Yevpatoria Raion (de jure)
- Federal subject: Crimea (de facto)
- Municipality: Saky Municipality (de facto)

Area
  - Total: 29 km^{2} (11 sq mi)
- Elevation: 10 m (33 ft)

Population (2014)
  - Total: 25,146
  - Density: 983.52/km^{2} (2,547.3/sq mi)
- Time zone: UTC+3 (MSK, de facto)
- Postal code: 96500 — 96509
- Area code: +7-36563
- Website: http://saki.rk.gov.ru/rus/index.htm

Saky (Ukrainian and Russian: Саки; Crimean Tatar: Saq) is a city in Crimea. Although it is the administrative centre of the Saky Raion, it does not belong to the raion (district), serving instead as the center and the only locality of Saky Municipality. Population: 25,146 (2014 Census).

== History ==
The exact origin of the present town of Saky is unknown. At the time of the Crimean Khanate, Saky was a small village. In 1805, Saky had less than 400 people, more than 95 percent of whom were Crimean Tatars. In 1827, the first bathhouse was built and ten years later an office of the military hospital of Simferopol.

During the Crimean War, the allied forces landed near Saky between Saky Lake and Kyzyl-Yar Lake and besieged Sevastopol. At the beginning of February 1855, the troops of General Stepan Aleksandrovich Khroulev focused on Saky before attacking the enemy in the fortifications of Evpatoria. The village was completely destroyed by bombing.

After the Crimean War, during the second wave of emigration of Crimean Tatars, the Tatar population of Saky abandoned the ruined village. In 1858, migrants from the region of Poltava settled there, followed a little later by the Greeks of Constantinople.

In February 1945, the British and American delegations at the Yalta conference landed at Saky Airport.

Saky city council member Oleh Kolodyazhnyi (Our Ukraine) was shot dead in Saky on June 29, 2010.

A series of explosions occurred at the nearby Saky air base on August 9, 2022.

== Economy ==
- Jodobrom § Iodobrom, bromine iodine and other halogens halides and other different chemicals
- Saky Chemical Plant, Chemical Industry, various chemicals production

Saki CHP thermal plant was recently updated enhanced output with an PGU GTE25P gas turbine units

== Education ==
- Agricultural College (Branch), Crimean Federal University

== Gallery ==
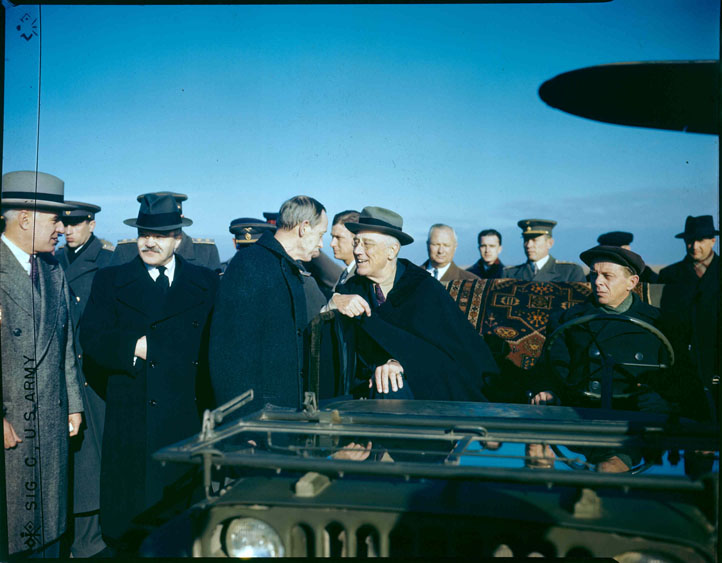
President FDR at Saky Airport

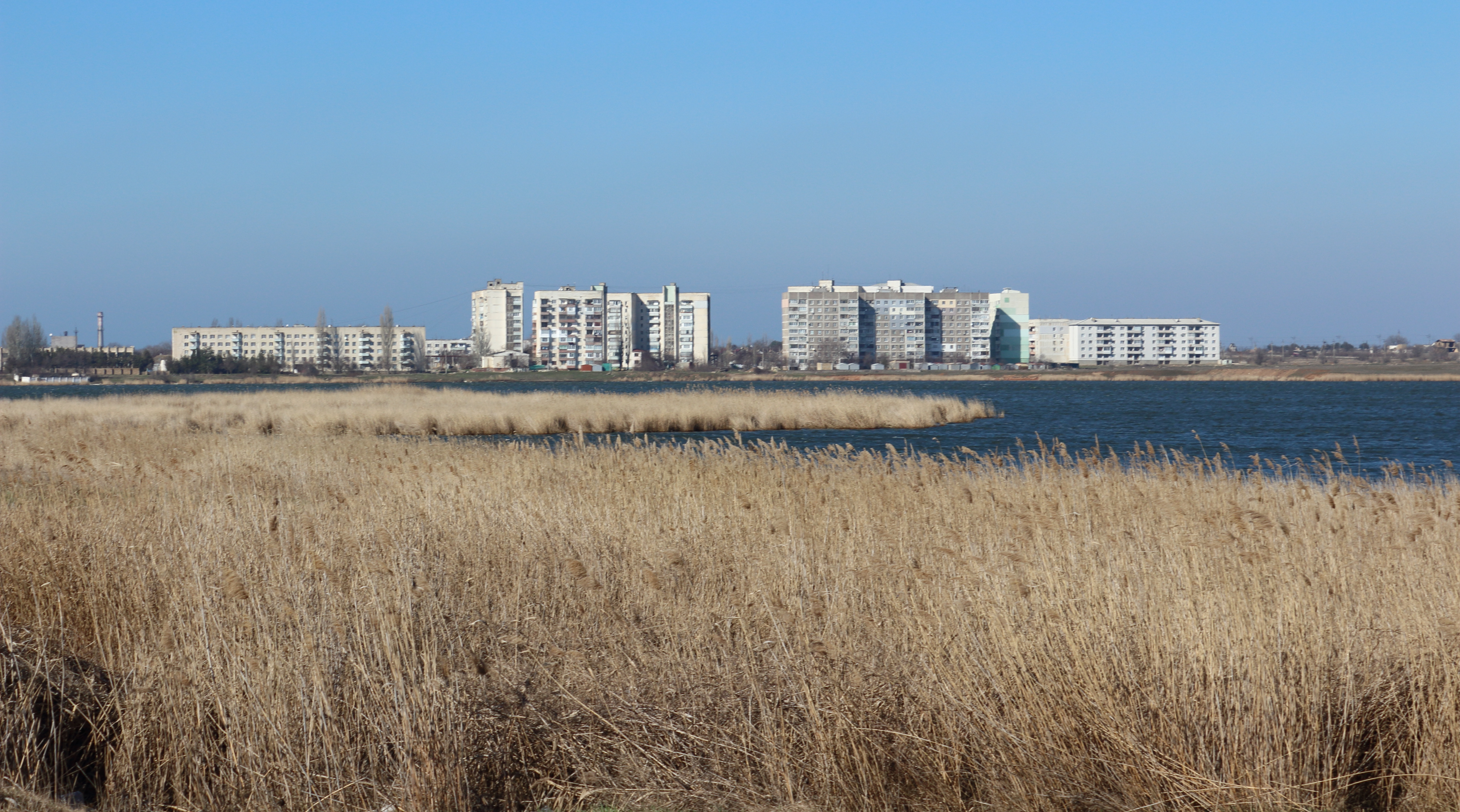
Lake Cokrak in Saky

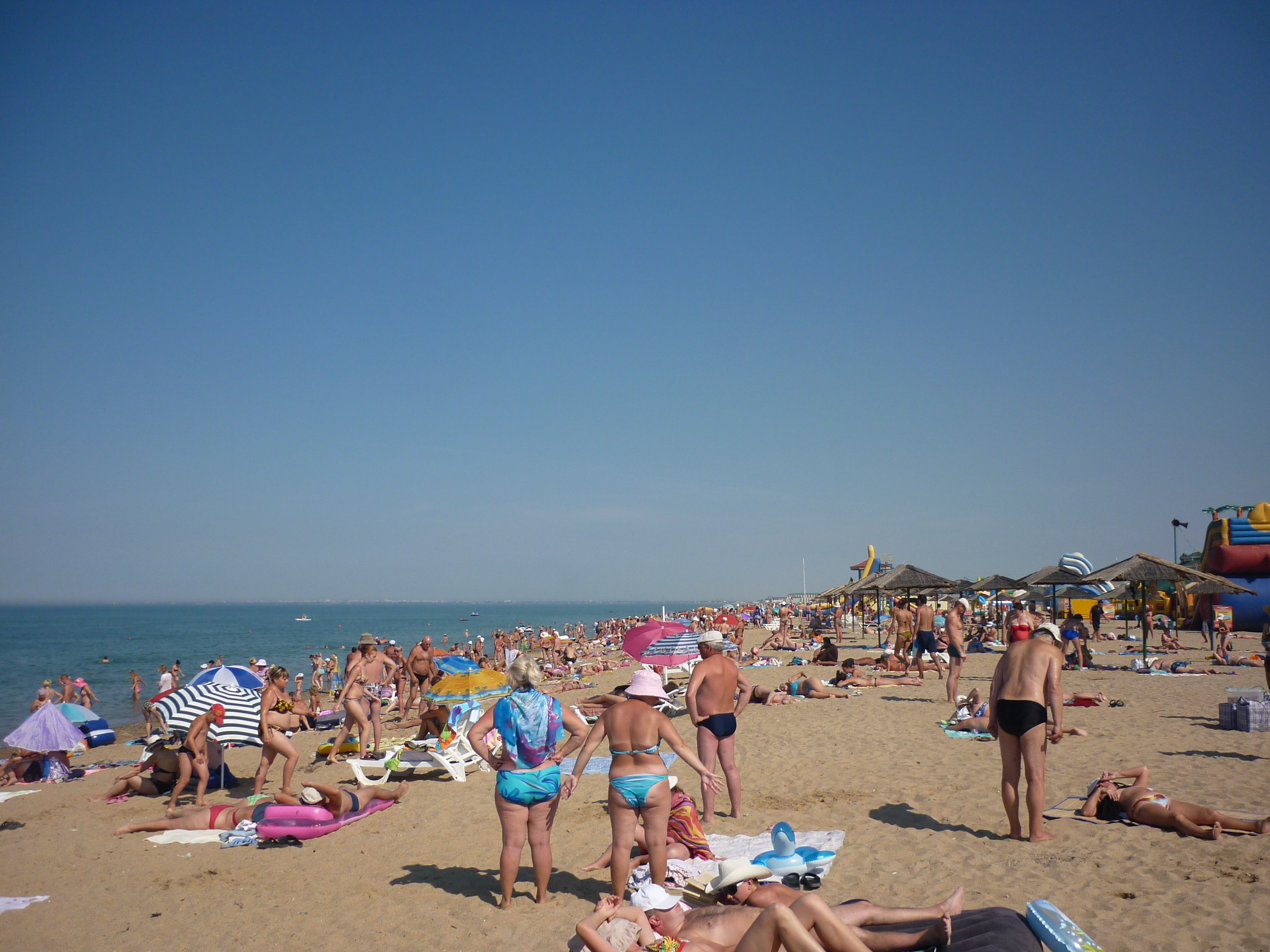
Beach in Saky

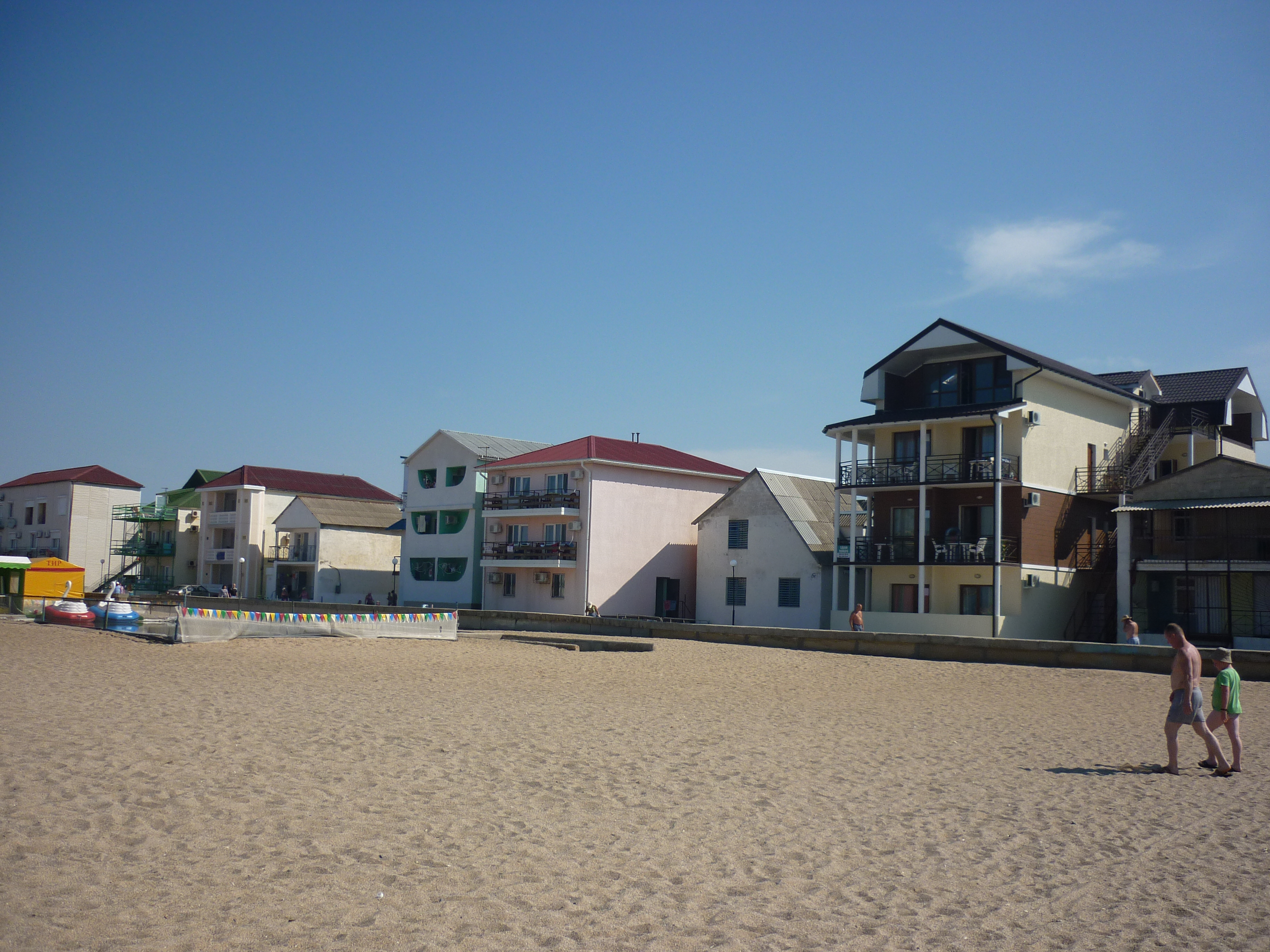
Seaside resorts

== Notable people ==
- Mykola Matviyenko (born 1996), Ukrainian football player with over 250 camps for Shakhtar Donetsk, and over with 70 camps of obtained call-ups from the Ukraine national football team.
- Dmytro Matviyenko (born 1992), Ukrainian football player
