= Oil in Ukraine =

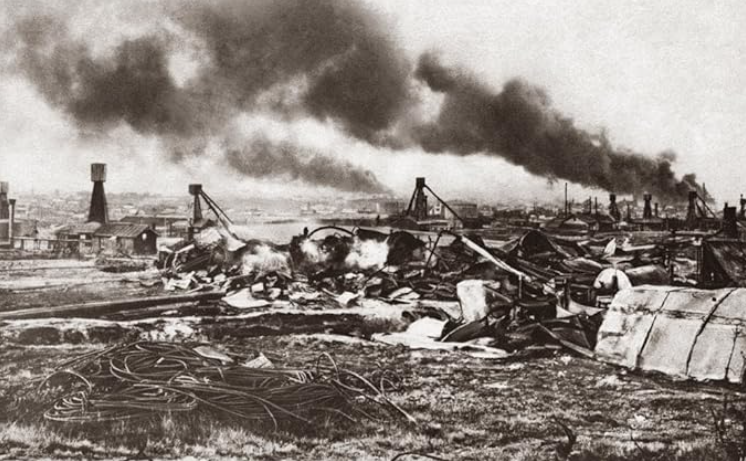
Russians setting oil wells in Boryslav - now in Ukraine - on fire in 1915

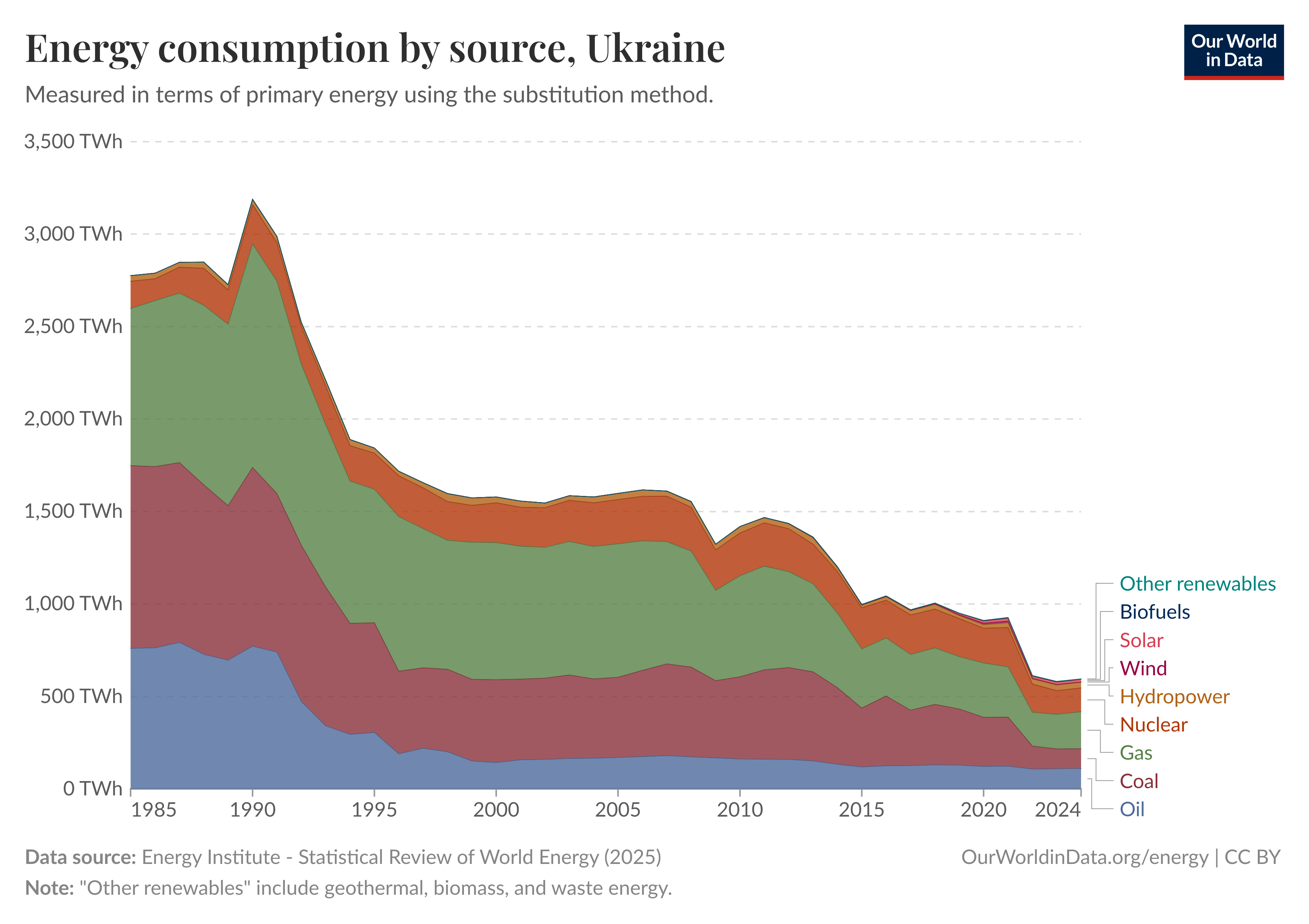
Oil consumption declined in the 1990s after the breakup of the Soviet Union

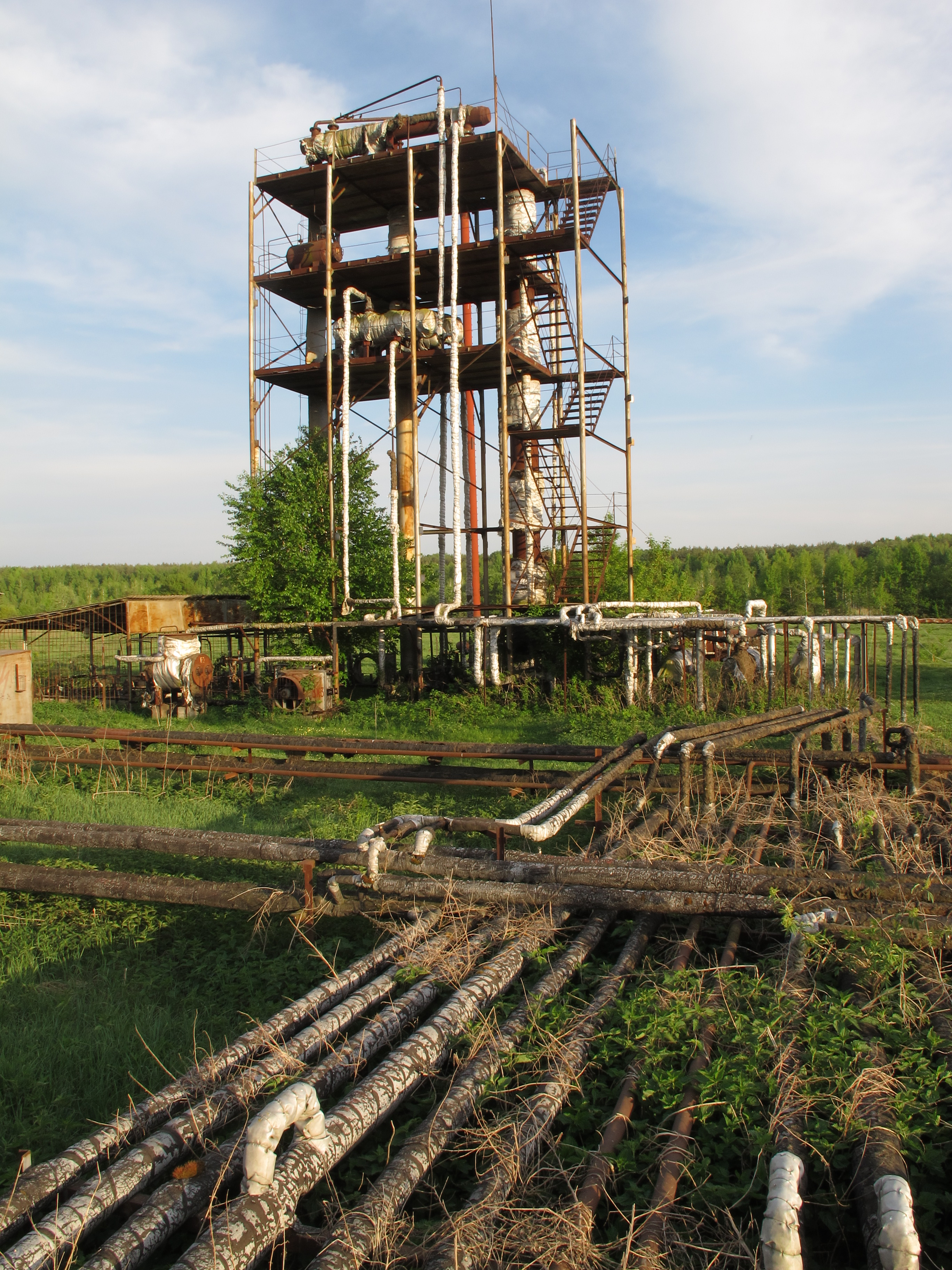
Abandoned Oil Depot. Ukraine, Kodra. (8732151705)

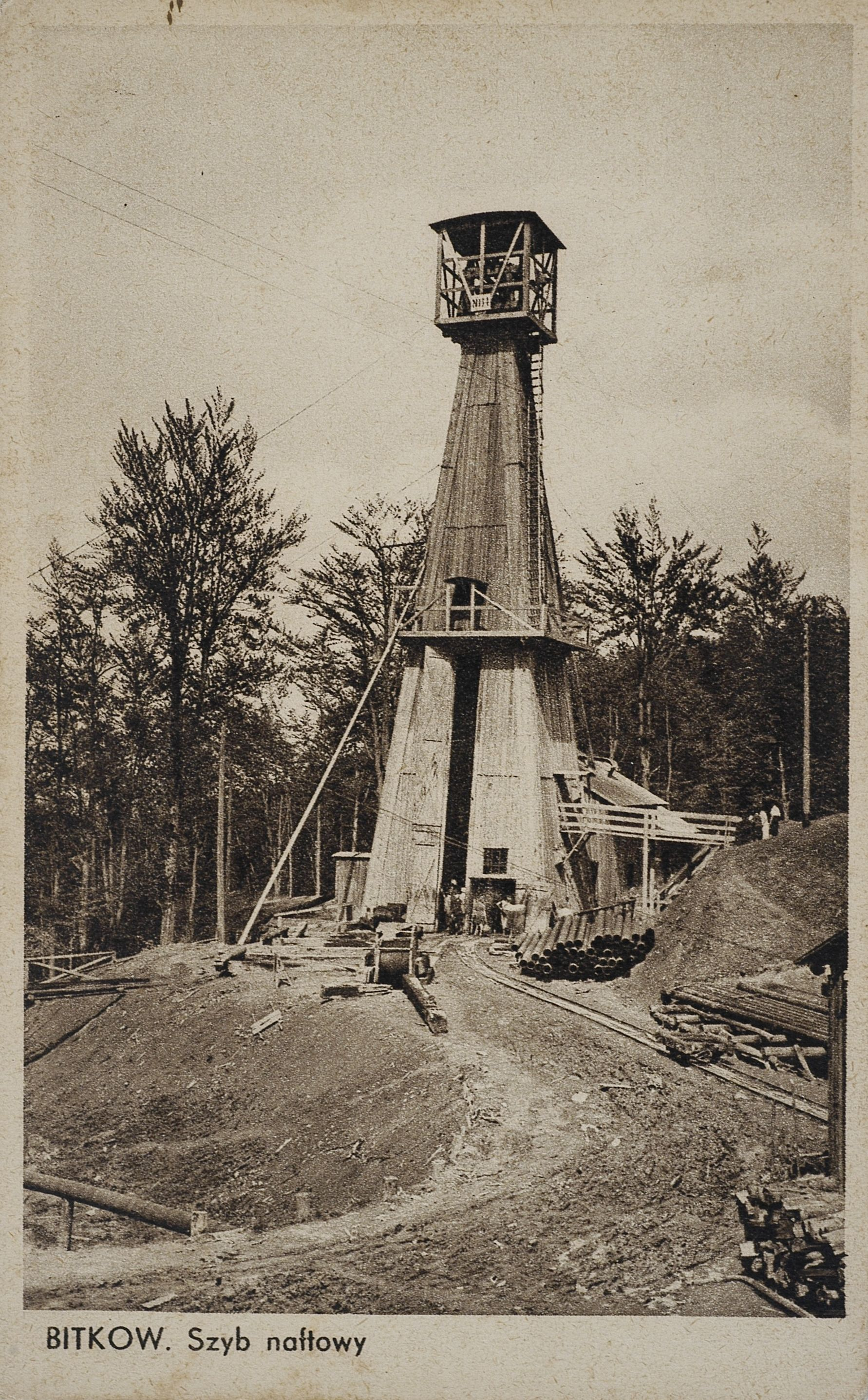
Bitkow szyb naftowy petroleum oil well Ukraine

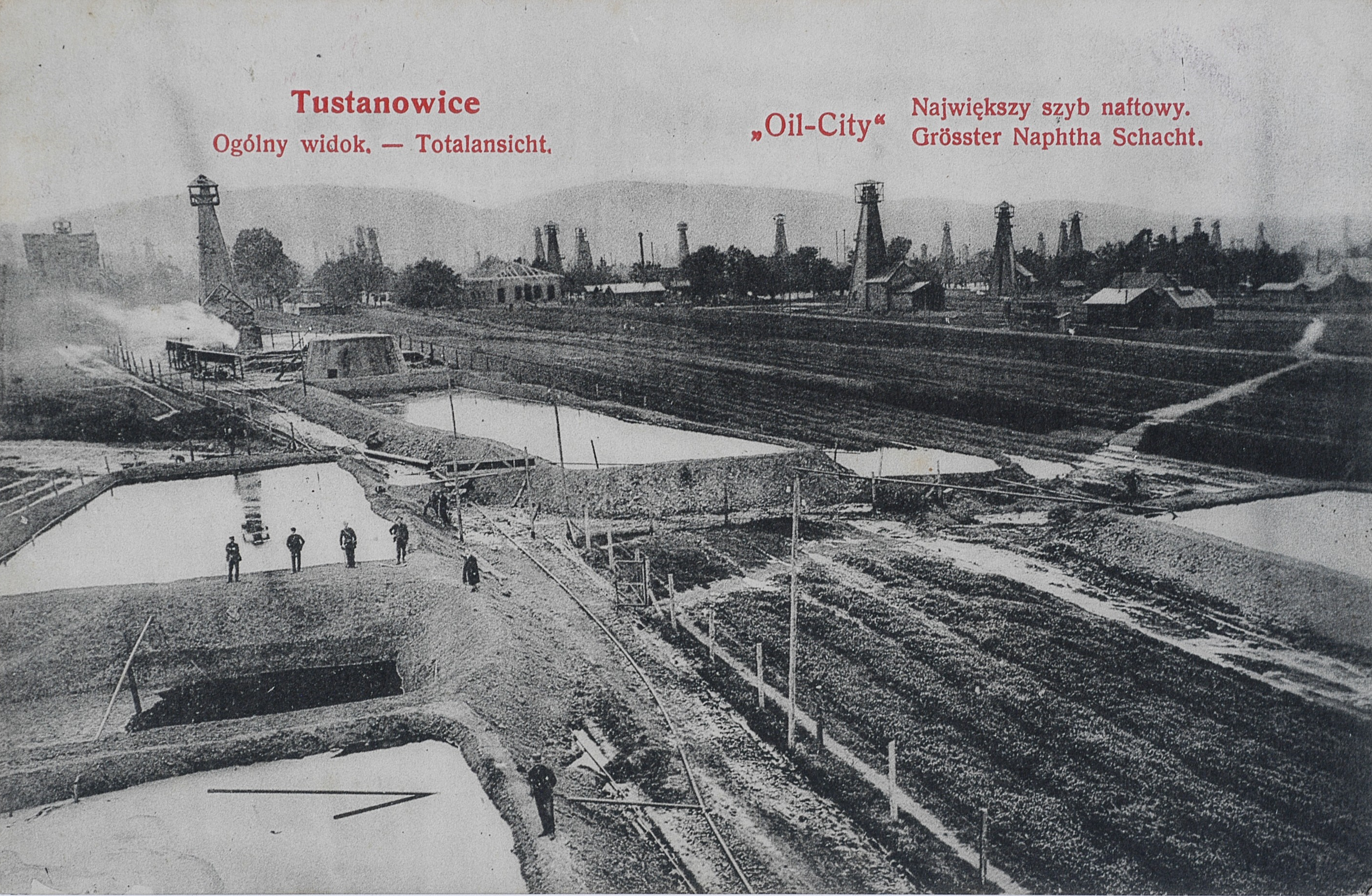
Oil well "Oil City" in Tustanovichi. 1908 year

In 2022 almost a fifth of total energy supply in Ukraine was from oil, and most energy imports were oil products such as gasoline and diesel. The country used to produce and refine its own oil. Strategic reserves of oil and products were set up after 2023 to help with energy security.

Products from Lukoil have been banned from transiting the country, except to Hungary. This goes through the Druzhba pipeline. Excise duty on diesel and gasoline was increased in 2024. The Odesa–Brody pipeline is not being used as of 2023. Refineries, such as Kremenchuk were destroyed or shutdown in 2022 in the Russo-Ukrainian war.

Formerly supplied from Russia and Belarus, gasoline and diesel now come from ports in Poland and Romania.
