= Dzhankoi (air base) =

Russian Aerospace Forces air base in Crimea

Dzhankoi (Dzhankoy)
- Dzhankoi, Dzhankoi Raion, Crimea in Ukraine
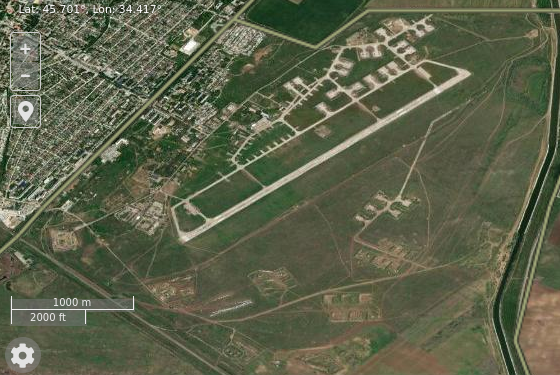
- Satellite imagery of Dzhankoi air base

Site information
- Operator: Russian Aerospace Forces

Location
- Shown within Crimea Dzhankoi (Ukraine)
- Coordinates: 45°42′03″N 34°25′02″E

Site history
- Built: 1947
- In use: 1947 -
- Battles/wars: Russian invasion of Ukraine

Airfield information
- Identifiers: ICAO: UKFY
Runways
Direction	Length and surface
05/23	2,220 metres (7,283 ft) Concrete

Dzhankoi is a military air base (ICAO: UKFY) near Dzhankoi, Crimea. It is currently operated by the Russian Aerospace Forces. Prior to the Russian annexation of Crimea in 2014, Dzhankoi was Ukrainian, and before 1992 Soviet, military airfield, and then a civilian airport.

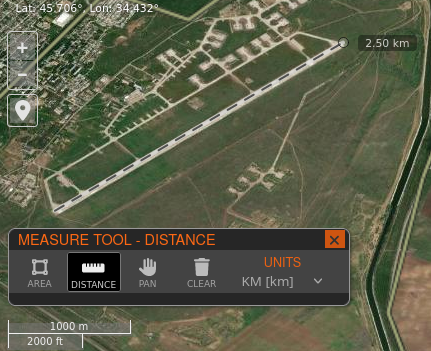
NASA's FIRMS shows runway 05/23 extended to 2.50 km

As of 2024 satellite imagery shows runway 05/23 extended to 2.50 km.

== History ==
In 1995, Dhankoi was entered in the State Register of Civil Aerodromes of Ukraine, and in 1999 it was certified as an international airport, with the ability to accept and release aircraft of all classes day and night in complex meteorological conditions.

As of October 2022 the Russian 39th Guards Independent Helicopter Regiment, which flies the Kamov Ka-52 "Alligator" (NATO: Hokum B), Mil Mi-8AMTSh (NATO: Hip), Mil Mi-28N (NATO: Havoc) and Mil Mi-35M (NATO: Hind), used the base under the 27th Composite Aviation Division.

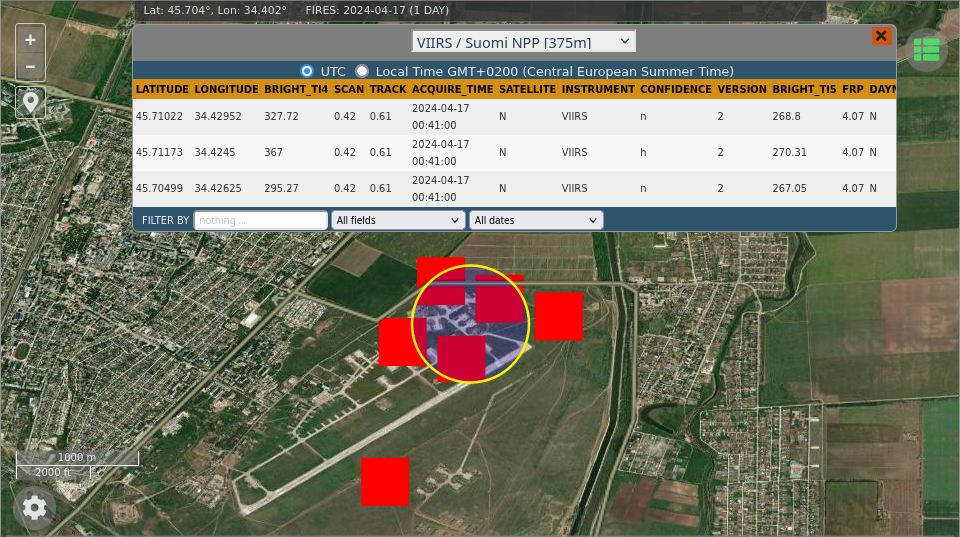
NASA's FIRMS imagery from 17 April 2024 00:41:00 (UTC) showing six fires at Dzhankoi air base

On 17 April 2024, six explosions were reported at the airbase in Crimea. Russian milbloggers and Ukrainian sources believe that ATACMS missiles or ballistic missiles were used. Some of these missiles deployed cluster munitions. At least six explosions and multiple secondary explosions were reported by locals. On 19 April, subsequent satellite pictures showed the destruction of three to five S-300/S-400 components and other areas marked with "scorch marks" that suggested equipment that had been damaged but removed. Ukraine subsequently released footage of multiple missiles being launched at the air base.

== See also ==
- List of military airbases in Russia
