= Dzhankoi =

Dzhankoi Джанкой Canköy
- City
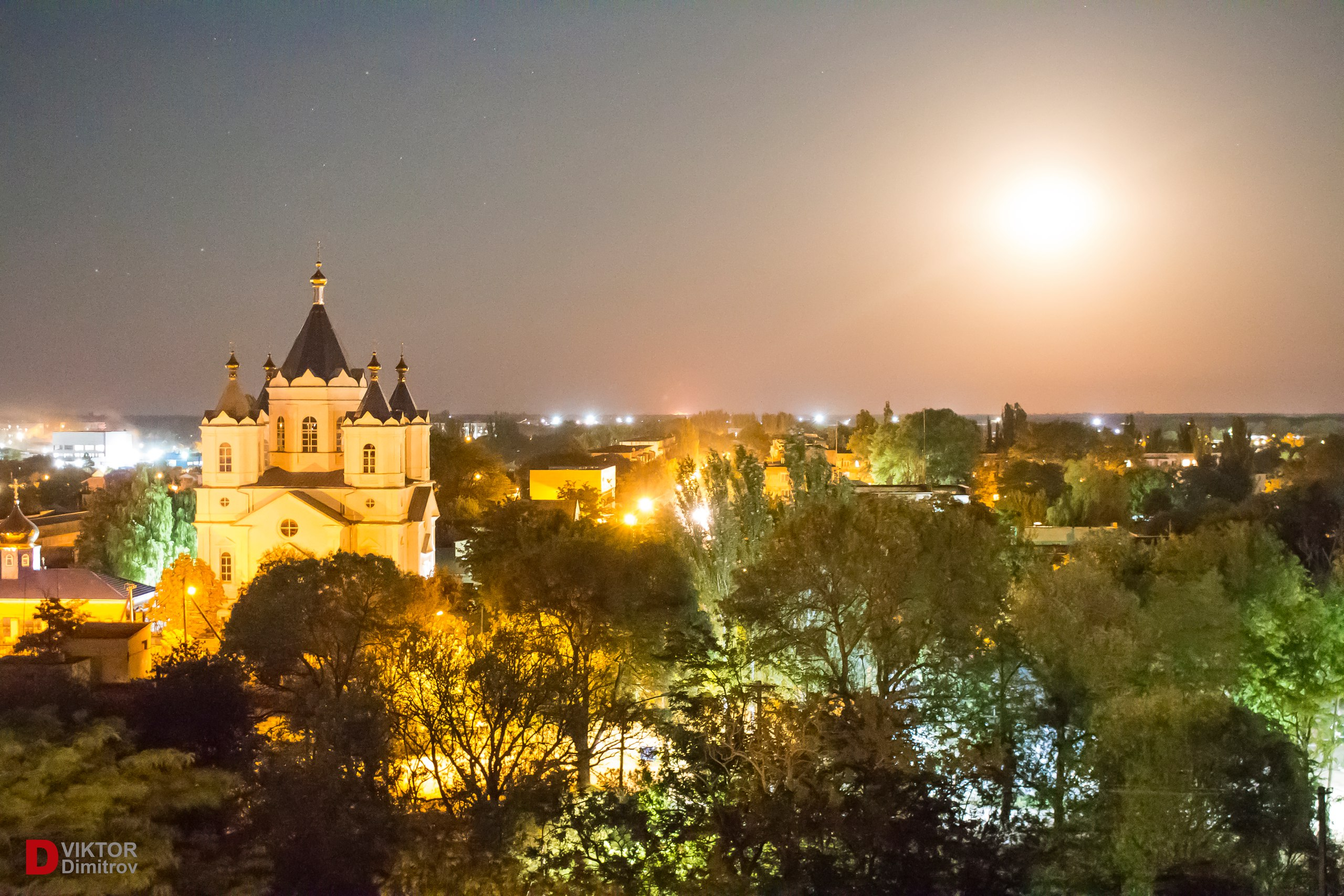

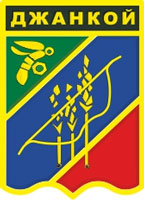
- Coat of arms
- Interactive map of Dzhankoi
- Location of Dzhankoi within Crimea Dzhankoi (Crimea)
- Coordinates: 45°42′31″N 34°23′36″E
- Country: Ukraine (occupied by Russia)
- Autonomous republic: Crimea
- Raion: Dzhankoi Raion

Area
  - Total: 26 km^{2} (10 sq mi)
- Elevation: 20 m (66 ft)

Population (2014)
  - Total: 38,622
  - Density: 1,648.5/km^{2} (4,270/sq mi)
- Time zone: UTC+3 (MSK)
- Postal code: 96100 — 96114
- Area code: +7-36564
- Website: dzhankoy.rk.gov.ru

Dzhankoi or Dzhankoy is a city of regional significance in the northern part of Crimea, internationally recognized as part of Ukraine, occupied by Russia since 2014. It also serves as administrative centre of Dzhankoi Raion. Population: 38,622 (2014 Census).

Located in the northeastern steppe region of Crimea, Dhankoi is an important railway junction. The city has various industries, which produce automobiles, reinforced concrete, fabric, meat, and other products. Dzhankoi also has professional technical schools.

== Etymology ==
The name Dzhankoi (Ukrainian and Russian: Джанкой; Crimean Tatar: Canköy; German: Dshankoj; Yiddish: דזשאַנקויע) is thought to originate from 'new village': canköy < cañı köy (cañı meaning 'new' in the northern dialect of Crimean Tatar). Note, the Latin script spelling with initial "Dzh-" is motivated by the spelling in languages using Cyrillic (viz. Ukrainian/Russian "Дж-"), which lacks a single glyph for the Turkic "C-".

Alternative hypotheses for the source of the name have been put forth, including 'spirit-village' (< Crimean Tatar can 'spirit' + köy 'village'). Other sources suggest etymological and geographical connections to the Circassian tribe of Zhaney noted in 1740 by an anonymous Ottoman author, who recorded an assessment that the name of the settlement of Dzhankoi in Crimea translated literally as "Zhan-village" (Jan-köy), linking it to the historical migrations or vassal status of the Zhaney population.

== Geography ==
Dzhankoi serves as the administrative centre of the Dzhankoi Raion. It is located about 93 kilometres (58 mi) from the Crimean capital, Simferopol. Two railroad lines, Solionoye ozero-Sevastopol and Armiansk-Kerch, cross Dzhankoi.

=== Climate ===
Dzhankoi's climate is mostly hot in the summer, and mild in the winter. The average temperature ranges from −2 °C (28 °F) in January, to 23 °C (73 °F) in July. The average precipitation is 420 millimetres (17 in) per year.

== History ==
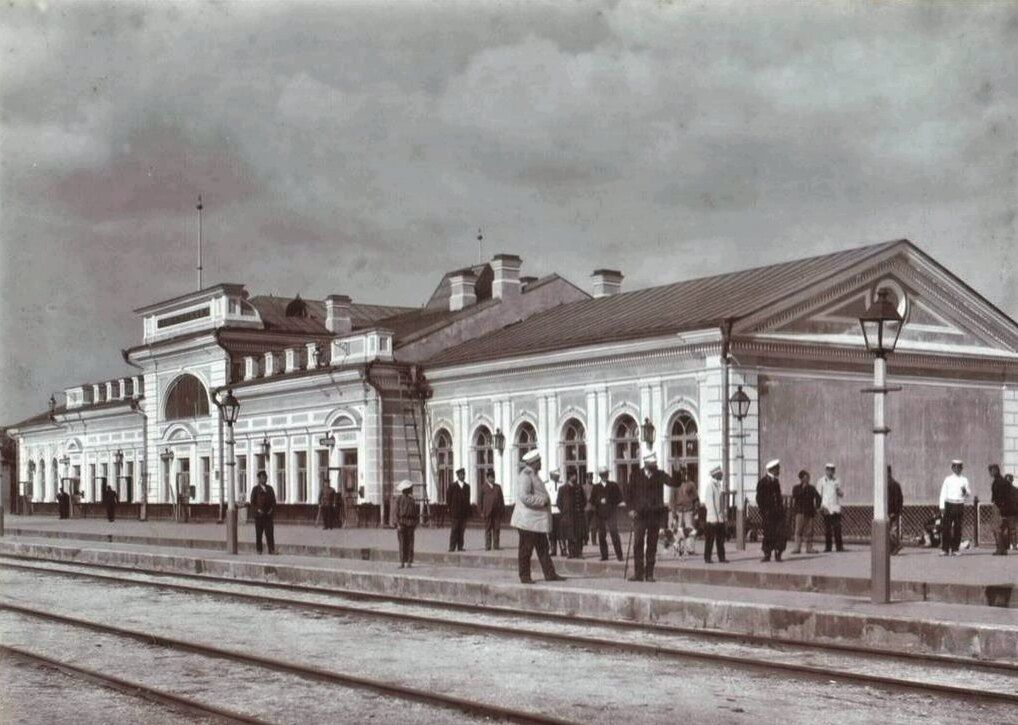
Railway station in 1910

Dzhankoi was mentioned for the first time in 1855. In April 1918 the city was captured by the Zaporozhian Corps of the Ukrainian People's Army, which expelled the Bolsheviks. It received city status in 1926. In 1933 Dzhankoi's population comprised 10,000 inhabitants. About 1,400 Jews lived in Dzhankoi on the eve of the Second World War.

In 1941, during the war, Dzhankoi was occupied by German troops. During the occupation, 720 Jewish members of the local collective farm were shot in the city. Other accounts mention 7,000, which could include Jews brought from elsewhere. From late 1941 to September 1942, the Germans operated the Dulag 123 transit prisoner-of-war camp in the town. Dzhankoi was recaptured by Soviet troops on April 13, 1944.

During the Soviet rule a motor repair plant and a canned vegetable factory were active in Dzhankoi. In 1954, as part of the Crimean region, it became part of the Ukrainian SSR. Since 1991, it has been a part of independent Ukraine. In February 2014, it was annexed by Russia. On the night of March 20, 2023, explosions caused by drone attacks were reported in the area.

== Transport ==
Dzhankoi is a transport hub. Through the city pass two major railways of the peninsula as well as two major European highways. It has two railroad terminals - the central one, where only passenger and fast trains stop and the suburban one - where only suburban trains, known as elektrichkas, are allowed.

Dzhankoi air base of the Russian Navy is nearby.

== Population ==
Year	Inhabitants
1805	173
1926	8,310
1939	19,576
1970	43,000
1989	53,464
2001	42,861
2014	38,622

== Demographics ==
As of the 2001 Ukrainian census, 59.75% of the population identified as Russians, 25.91% as ethnic Ukrainians, while Crimean Tatars made up 8.09% of the population. The town is also home to smaller Belarusian, Polish, Moldovan and Armenian communities.

In the 2014 census conducted by Russian occupation authorities, the town had a population of 38,622, of which 25,787 (66.77%) were Russian, 6,401 (16.57%) were Ukrainian, 2,807 (7.27%) were Crimean Tatar and 829 (2.15%) were Tatar.

2001 Ukrainian census
	percent
Russians	59.75%
Ukrainians	25.91%
Crimean Tatars	8.09%
Belarusians	1.54%
Moldovans	0.28%
Poles	0.28%
Armenians	0.27%
Tatars	0.20%
Azerbaijanis	0.16%
Jews	0.15%

2014 census (under Russian occupation)
	percent
Russians	66.77%
Ukrainians	16.57%
Crimean Tatars	7.27%
Tatars	2.15%

== In popular culture ==
Dzhankoi is the subject of a popular Yiddish song "Hey! Zhankoye" (Yiddish: "Dzhankoye" "דזשאַנקויע"), as popularized by The Limeliters, Pete Seeger, the Klezmatics, and Theodore Bikel, a Soviet-era song praising the life of Jews on collective farms in Crimea.

== Notable people ==
- Feodor Fedorenko (1907–1987), Ukrainian Nazi camp guard and war criminal
- Oleksandr Mitrofanov (born 1977), Ukrainian football player
- Denys Vasyliuk (1993–2024), Ukrainian fighter pilot and Hero of Ukraine
