= Novofedorivka =

Urban-type settlement in Crimea

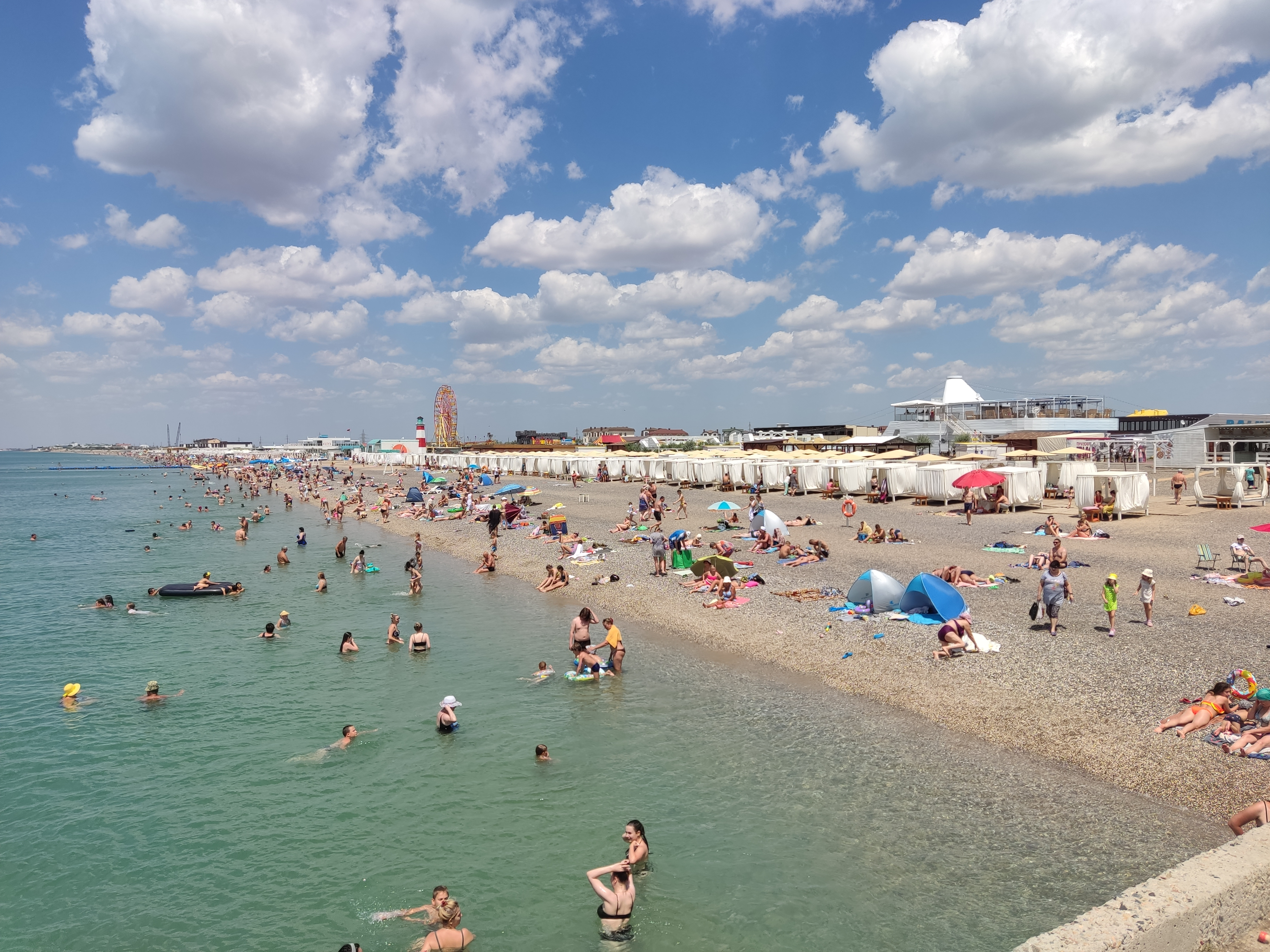

- Flag Coat of arms
- Interactive map of Novofedorivka
- Location of Novofedorivka within Crimea
- Coordinates: 45°05′37″N 33°34′06″E
- Country: Ukraine^{a}
- Region: Crimea^{b}
- Raion: Saky

Area
  - Total: 3.2 km^{2} (1.2 sq mi)

Population (2014)
  - Total: 6,584
- Time zone: UTC+3 (MSK (de facto))
- Postal code: 96574
- Area code: +380 6563
- ^{a} Ukraine (de jure), Russia (de facto)^{b} Autonomous Republic of Crimea (de jure) or the Republic of Crimea (de facto), depending on jurisdiction.

Novofedorivka (Ukrainian: Новофедорівка; Russian: Новофёдоровка, romanized: Novofyodorovka; Crimean Tatar: Novofödorovka) is an urban-type settlement in Crimea.

It is located about 3 kilometres (1.9 mi) south of the regional centre of Saky, and about 70 kilometres (43 mi) north of Sevastopol.

Population: 5,610 (2014 Census).

== History ==
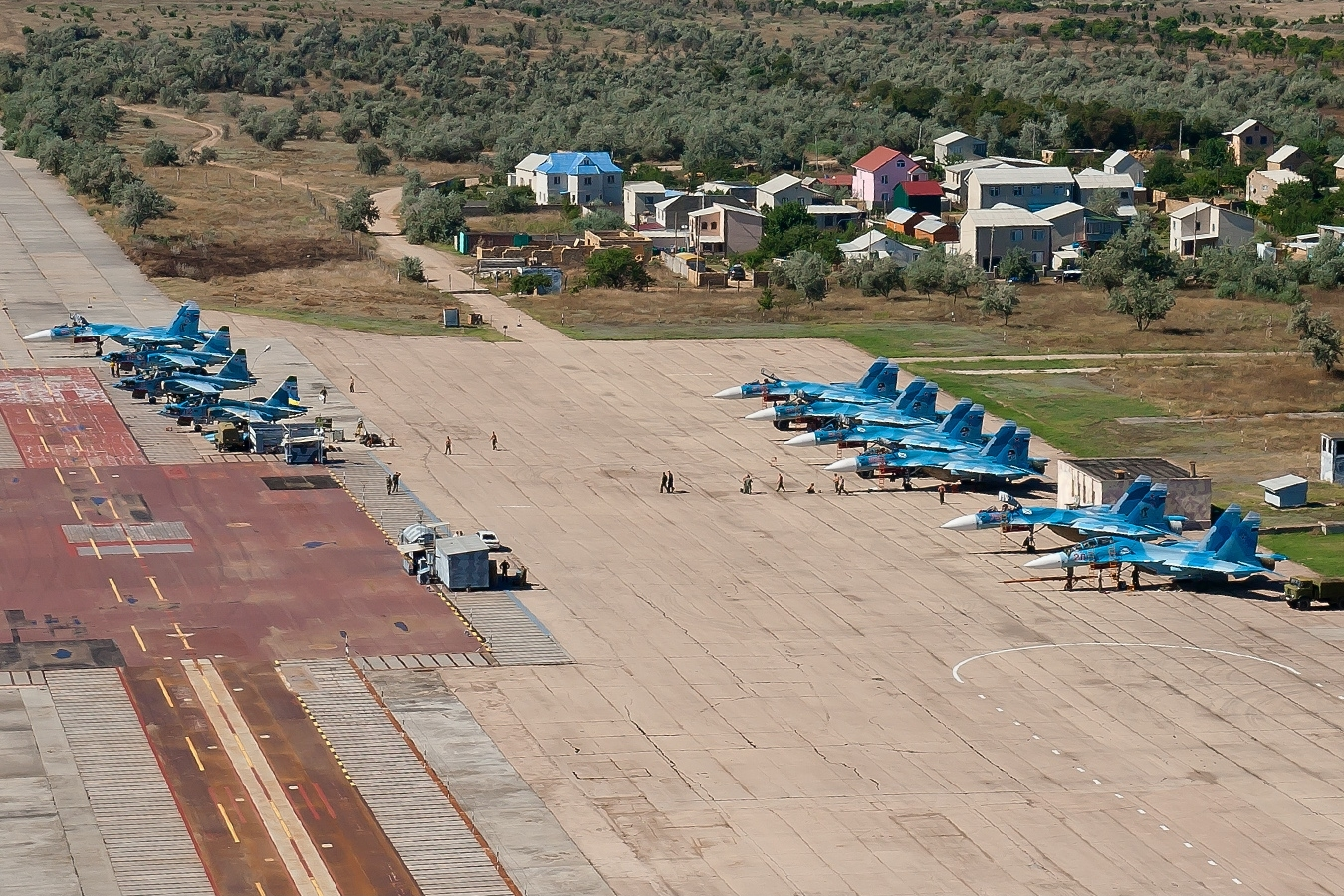
Part of the settlement of Novofedorivka, with Russian Naval Aviation aircraft at the adjacent Saky airbase in the foreground

In the 5th century BC there was an ancient Greek settlement on the site of Novofedorovka. Crimean archaeologist S. Lantsov carried out archaeological excavations of it in the 1980s.

Until 1917, there were several buildings on the territory of the village, the "Scarlet" dacha, the owner of which supplied therapeutic mud to Livadia for the treatment of the hemophiliac Alexei Nikolaevich, Tsarevich of Russia. On the map of the Crimean Statistical Office of 1922, Novo-Fyodorovka is not yet marked. But according to the "List of settlements of the Crimean ASSR according to the All-Union census on December 17, 1926", the village of Novo-Fedorovka had 28 households, 26 of which were peasants, the population was 124 people: 118 of them were Russians and 6 were Armenians Crimean ASSR.

In the 1930s, an unpaved airfield, which was to become Saky airbase, was built for the Kachinsky School of Military Pilots. During the German occupation of 1941–1944, an artificial surface was added to the airfield. In February 1945, the airfield received Winston Churchill's and Franklin Roosevelt's aircraft, when it arrived at the Yalta Conference.

According to a decree of the Supreme Council of the Republic of Crimea dated 12 December 1992, the urban-type settlement of Novofedorovka was formed as part of the Orekhovsky village council of Saky Raion. In November 1995, a separate Novofedorovsky village council was formed.

The area came under the Ukrainian Navy's control with the dissolution of the Soviet Union.

=== Russo-Ukrainian War ===
During the 2014 annexation of Crimea, Russian forces occupied the town and nearby Saky airbase.

In April 2014, the incident took place outside the Novofedorivka Air Base in the military dormitory building, which was occupied by Ukrainian servicemen and their families that were awaiting relocation to mainland Ukraine. While Ukrainian Navy major Stansilav Karachevsky of the military unit No. 1100 was preparing his belongings in preparation to leave Crimea, an altercation between him and several soldiers on both sides broke out. The scuffle escalated to where Russian spetsnaz sergeant E.S. Zaitsev shot the unarmed officer twice in the head at point blank range with an AK-74 assault rifle on the 5th floor of the dormitory building where Russian soldiers were evacuating the troops. Major Karachevsky was pronounced dead immediately. A second Ukrainian personnel, identified as Captain Artem Yermolenko, was beaten and abducted by Russian soldiers. Russian sources confirmed the death of a Ukrainian major perpetrated by one of its sergeants. After the incident, the major's body was reportedly taken by Russian troops. Zaytsev was convicted by a Russian military court for murder and sentenced to two years imprisonment.

On 9 August 2022, during the Russian invasion of Ukraine, several very large explosions occurred at the nearby Saky air base. The explosions were focused on the extensive aircraft dispersal complex to the north and west of the runway complex.
