= Saky (air base) =

Military airfield in Novofedorivka Crimea

Saky
- Saky, Crimea; Near Novofedorivka in Ukraine
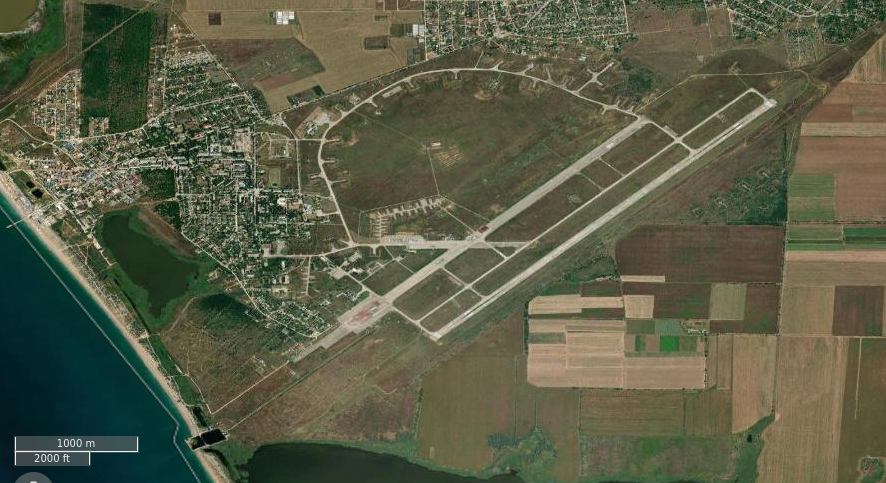
- Satellite imagery of Saky air base

Site information
- Type: Air Base
- Operator: Russian Navy - Russian Naval Aviation
- Controlled by: Black Sea Fleet

Location
- Shown within Crimea Saky airbase (Ukraine)
- Coordinates: 45°5′35″N 33°35′42″E

Site history
- In use: Unknown to present

Airfield information
- Identifiers: ICAO: UKFI
- Elevation: 180 metres (591 ft) AMSL
Runways
Direction	Length and surface
04R/22L	3,175 metres (10,417 ft) Concrete

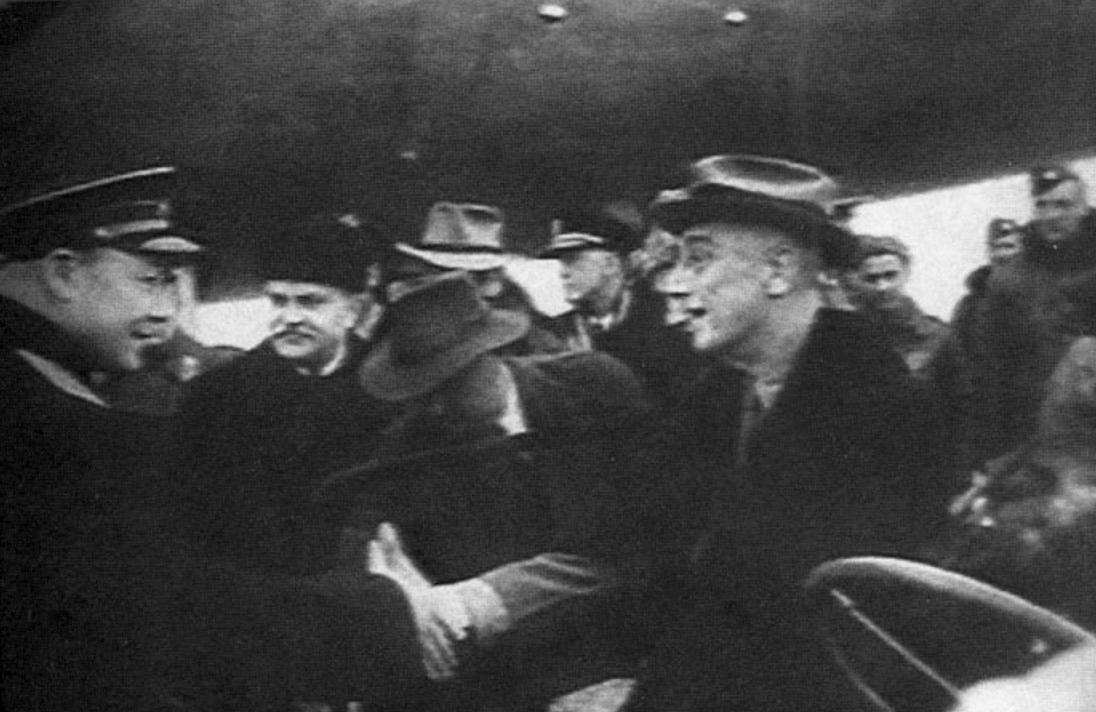
Soviet Fleet Admiral Kuznetsov and Franklin Delano Roosevelt on the base in February 1945. Roosevelt came for the Yalta Conference.

Saky (Ukrainian and Russian: Саки) is an air base adjacent to the settlement of Novofedorivka, Crimea. It was initially built by the Soviet Union in the 1930s, and has been operated under both Ukrainian and Russian sovereignty since 1992.

Since 2014, following the start of the Russo-Ukrainian War and the annexation of Crimea by Russia, the base has been operated by the Russian Ministry of Defence. The base is home of the 43rd Independent Naval Assault Aviation Regiment operating Sukhoi Su-24M/MR, Sukhoi Su-30SM and Tupolev Tu-1344A-4 aircraft. It is also the location of the Russian NITKA ("Scientific testing simulator for shipborne aviation") land-based aircraft carrier training and test simulator.

== History ==
=== Soviet Union ===
The first unpaved airfield was built in 1930s for the Kachinsky School of Military Pilots.

During World War II the occupying German forces expanded the airfield and paved the runways, ruins of which are still visible today. At the time of the Yalta Conference in February 1945 president Franklin D. Roosevelt's and prime minister Winston Churchill's aircraft landed at Saky. Later the airfield played an important role in the work of the Center for Deep Space Communications near Yevpatoria.

The Soviet Navy's Black Sea Fleet used Saky as a major air base. In 1945 the 30th independent Sevastopolskiy Red Banner Maritime Reconnaissance Aviation Regiment arrived, flying Pe-2s. In the early 1950s four regiments of maritime torpedo aviation were at the base. The base was home to the 16th Fighter Aviation Regiment between September 1952 and January 1960.

In September 1976, the 299th Instructor-Research Shipborne Aviation Regiment (Military Unit Number 10535) was formed with Yakovlev Yak-38 and Mikoyan-Gurevich MiG-21s. A platform was built for practicing vertical takeoff and landing. A decision was made to build a training complex for carrier-based pilots for aircraft carriers under construction at Mykolaiv. Thus the base became home for the only Soviet aircraft carrier shore-based landing, trainer and test site, the NITKA ground-based test and training simulator for carrier operations, with arresting gear and a ski-jump ramp. The ski jump was a full-sized replica of the bow of the Admiral Kuznetsov. In 1982, the carrier-based aviation training complex, part of the 23rd test site, was put into operation.

The 100th Independent Shipborne Fighter Aviation Regiment was established on 10 March 1986 at Saki. In January 1992 many of the regiment's personnel refused to take the oath of allegiance to Ukraine, and left for Russia, leaving the equipment behind.

The flying unit at the base appears to have been the 1063rd Center for Combat Employment Shipborne Aviation from 1988 to 1992.

=== Ukraine ===
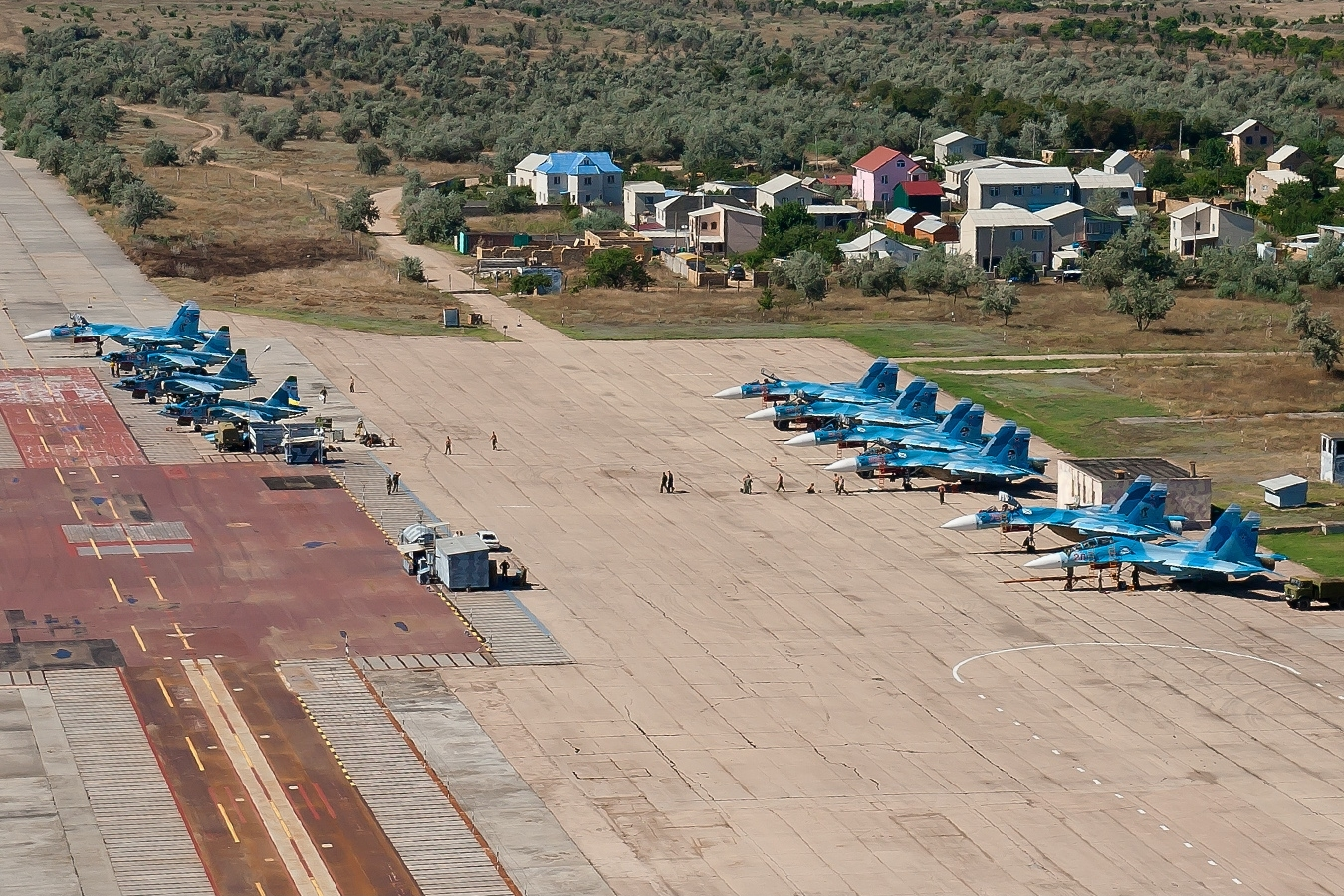
Russian Naval Aviation aircraft at Saky c. 2010

Following Ukrainian independence in 1991, the base continued to be used by the Russian Navy, and was formally leased by Russia after 1992.

The 299th Regiment, by now designated Ukraine's 299th Tactical Aviation Brigade, flying solely Sukhoi Su-25s, moved away to Kulbakino Air Base in Mykolaiv Oblast in 2005.

During the 2008 South Ossetia War, Ukrainian president Viktor Yushchenko stopped Russian pilots from using the carrier training facilities. The decision was reversed in April 2010. Meanwhile, the Russian Navy had begun to build a similar facility at Yeysk in the Krasnodar region of Russia, by the Sea of Azov.

==== Russian occupation of Crimea ====
Russian forces occupied the base during the Russian occupation of Crimea in early 2014. The Ukrainian 10th Saky Naval Aviation Brigade, controlling all the Ukrainian Navy's air units, managed to get a number of its aircraft airborne to fly to bases in mainland Ukraine on March 5, but more than a dozen aircraft and helicopters undergoing maintenance had to be abandoned.

On 1 July 2014, the 43rd independent Naval Assault Aviation Regiment arrived at the base from Gvardeyskoye, also in the Crimea. In turn, the regiment had arrived from Choibalsan in Mongolia in June 1990.

===== Murder of Stanislav Karachevsky =====
On 7 April 2014, the Ukrainian defense ministry announced that a Ukrainian Naval officer had been shot dead in the village of Novofedorivka. The incident took place outside the Novofedorivka Air Base in the military dormitory building, which was occupied by Ukrainian servicemen and their families that were awaiting relocation to mainland Ukraine.

While Ukrainian Navy Major Stanislav Karachevsky of military unit No. 1100 was preparing his belongings in preparation to leave Crimea, a conflict between him and several soldiers on both sides broke out. The fight escalated to where Junior Sergeant Yevheniy S. Zaytsev of the Black Sea Fleet shot the unarmed officer twice in the head and chest at point blank range with an AK-74 assault rifle on the fifth floor of the dormitory building where Russian soldiers were evacuating the troops. Karachevsky died immediately. A second Ukrainian officer, Captain Artem Yermolenko, was beaten and abducted by Russian soldiers. The major's body was reportedly taken by Russian troops.

Russian sources confirmed the killing, but said that it was an incident where a group of drunk Ukrainian soldiers on their way to the sleeping quarters encountered Russian soldiers manning a checkpoint on the road to the air base where they were previously stationed. The Ukrainian armed forces says that Russian soldiers pursued the unarmed Ukrainian into the barracks, shot him dead, and then moved the body.

Zaytsev was convicted by a Russian military court for murder and sentenced to two years imprisonment.

===== After the 2022 Russian invasion =====
On 9 August 2022, during the Russian invasion of Ukraine, several explosions occurred at the military airbase. Satellite images showed that the explosions destroyed "at least eight aircraft... with several craters visible... Most of the damaged or destroyed aircraft [were] in a specific area of the base where a large number of planes were parked out in the open – away from the cover of hangars." By 19 August, Reuters reported that an unnamed Western official said that "[w]e now assess that the events of... August 9 put more than half of [the] Black Sea fleet's naval aviation combat jets out of use."

The base was also struck on 21 September 2023.

On 6 January 2024, a command post at the base was struck with Storm Shadow missiles, killing Lieutenant Colonel Alexander Chornobryby, the deputy commander of the 43rd Independent Naval Assault Aviation Regiment.

There were reported explosions near the air base on June 12th 2026.

== Layout ==
The base has two, parallel, southwest–northeast runways, a smaller east–west carrier landing facility, and an extensive dispersal complex to the north and west. The main base hangars and workshops are to the west of the runway complex.

The carrier take-off trainer faces northeast on the northern parallel runway. The carrier landing trainer is on the southwest end of that runway.

== Gallery ==
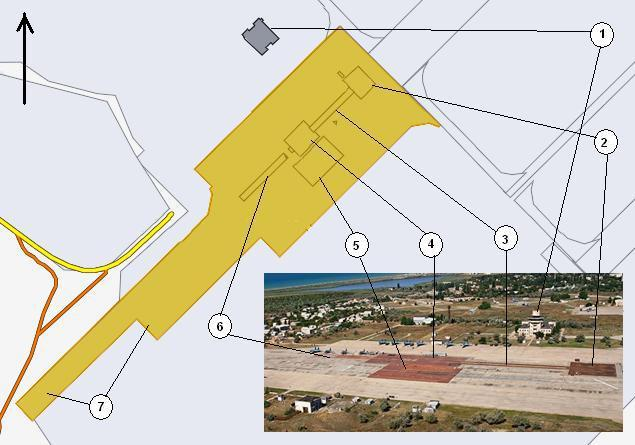
Diagram

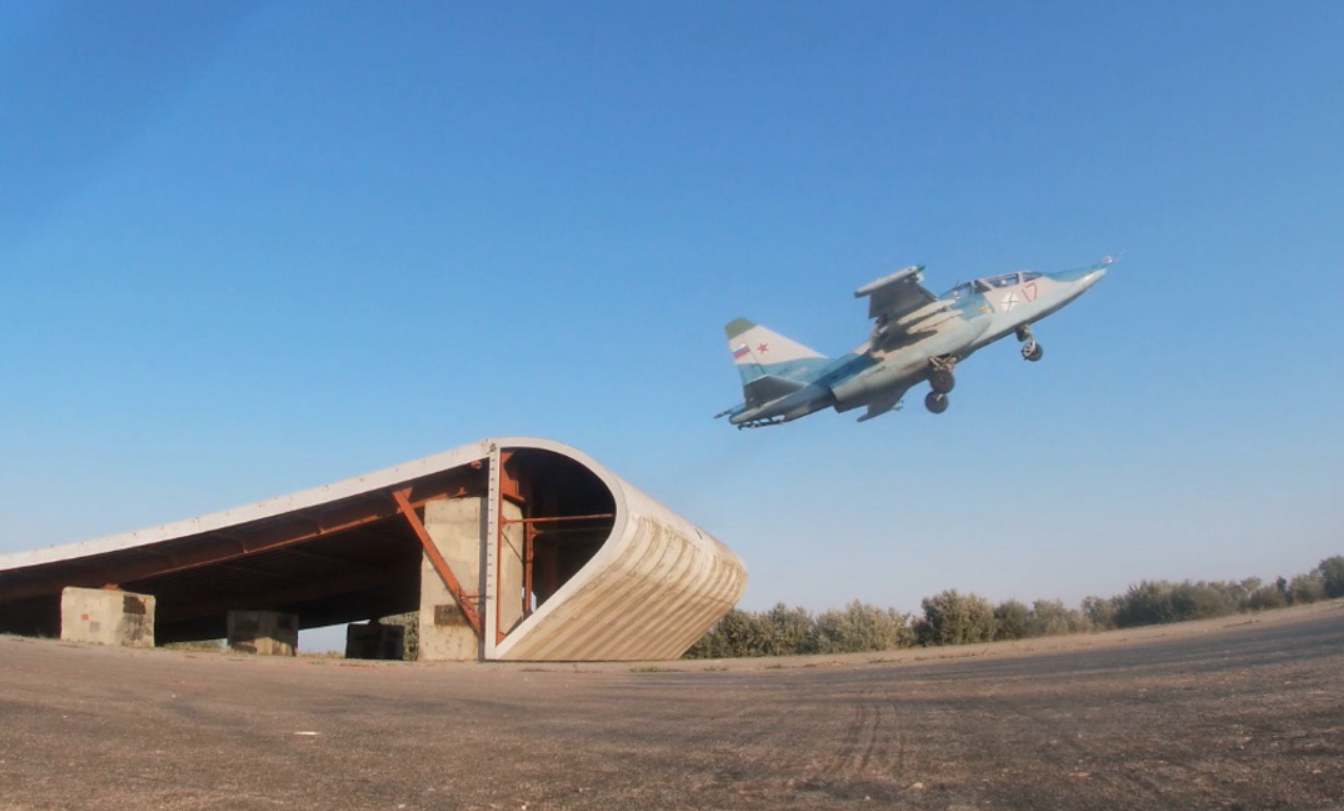
Ski-jump. Side view

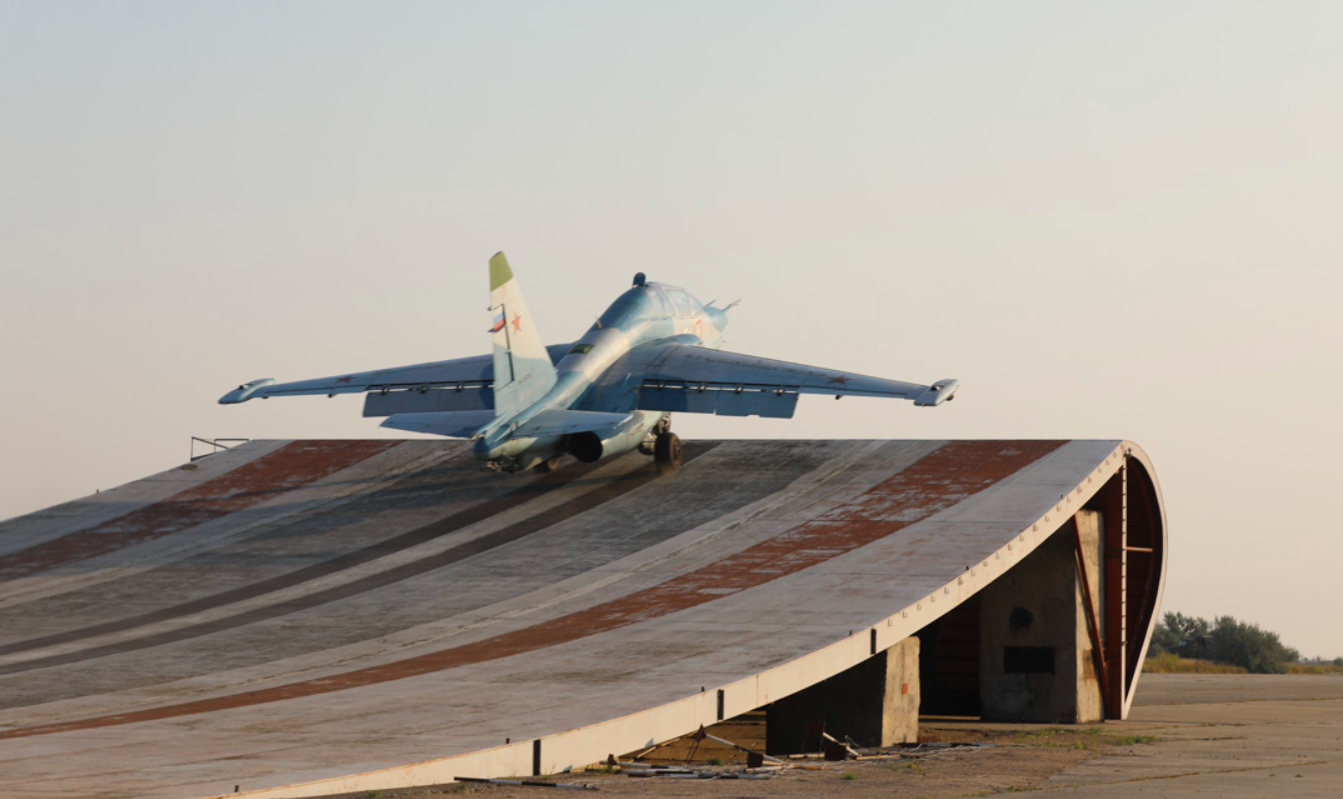
Take off from the ski-jump

== See also ==
- List of military airbases in Russia
