= Saky Raion =

Saky Raion Сакський район
- Raion
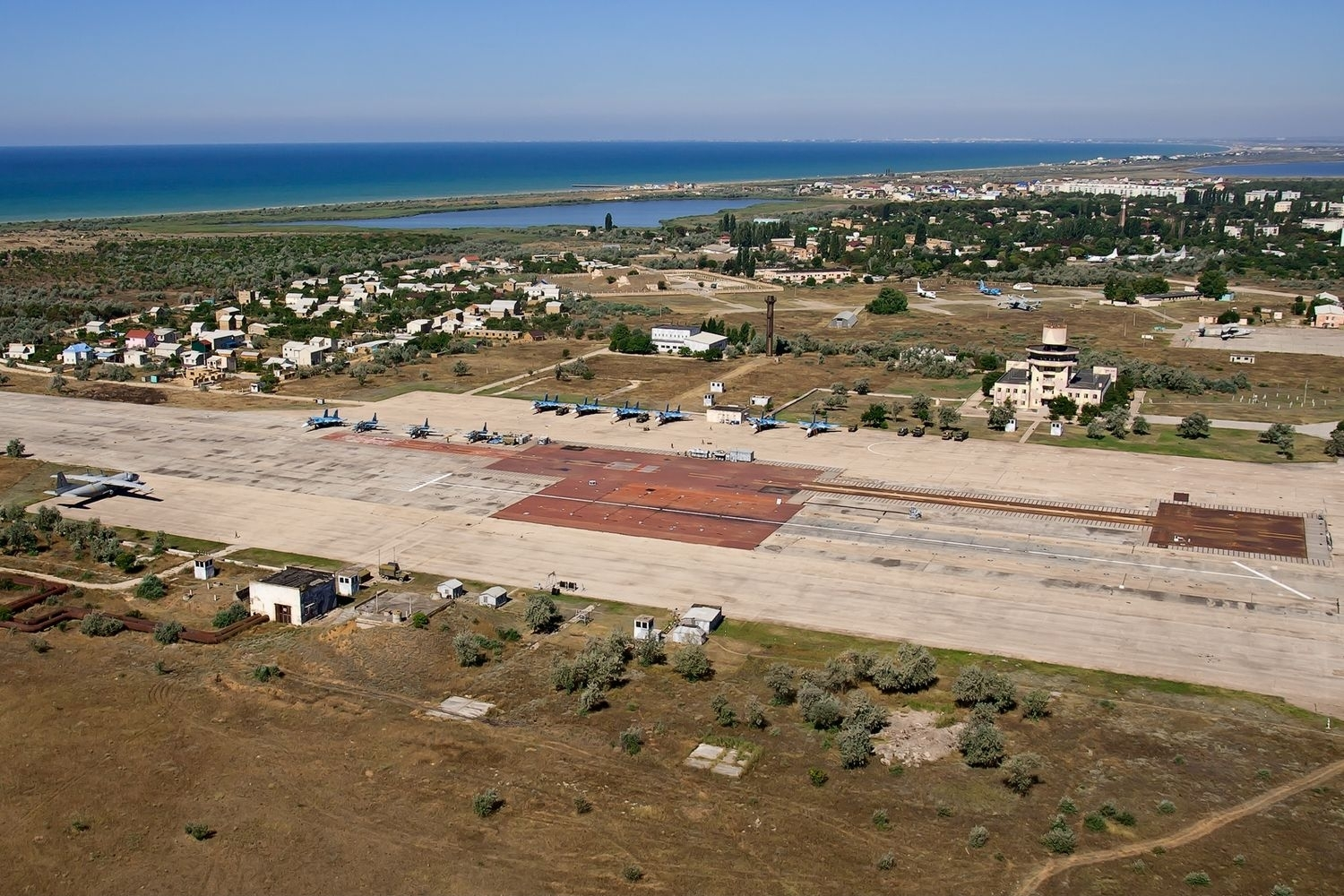
- Airbase at Novofedorivka, Saky District

- Flag Seal
- Raion location within Crimea
- Coordinates: 45.1336°N 33.5772°E
- Country: Ukraine (occupied by Russia)
- Republic: Crimea
- Capital: Saky
- Subdivisions: List: 0 cities; 1 towns; 78 villages

Area
  - Total: 2,257 km^{2} (871 sq mi)

Population (2014)
  - Total: 76,489
  - Density: 33.89/km^{2} (87.77/sq mi)
- Time zone: UTC+3 (MSK)
- Dialing code: +380-6563
- Website: sakirs.ru

Saky Raion (Ukrainian: Сакський район, Russian: Сакский район, Crimean Tatar: Saq rayonı) is one of the 25 regions of the Autonomous Republic of Crimea, a territory recognized by a majority of countries as part of Ukraine and incorporated by Russia as the Republic of Crimea. Its administrative center is the city of Saky, which is not a part of the district. Population: 76,489 (2014 Census).

The district includes the urban-type settlement of Novofedorivka.

== 2020 Ukrainian administrative reform ==
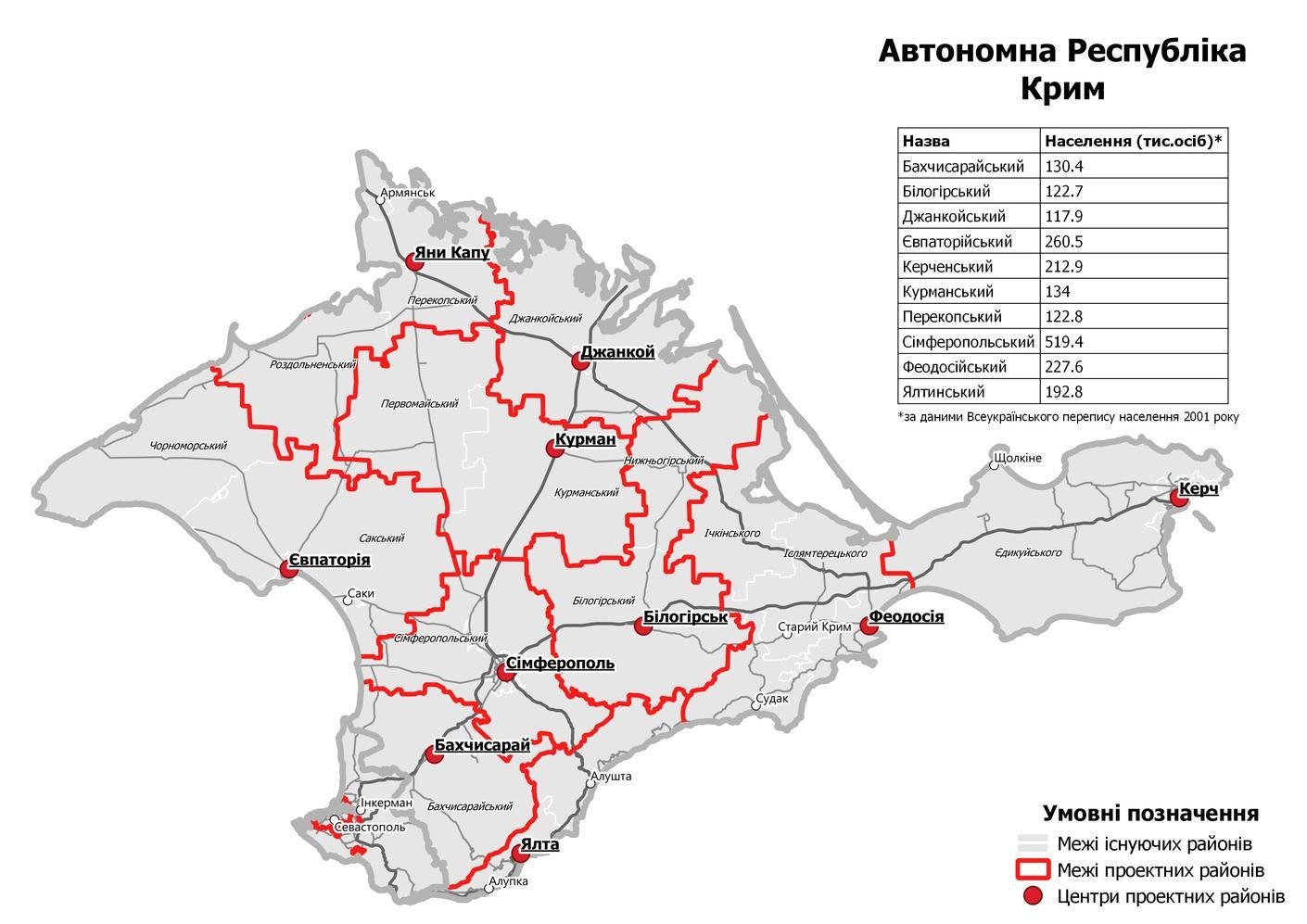
In July 2020, the Verkhovna Rada approved an administrative reform in Crimea

In July 2020, Ukraine conducted an administrative reform throughout its de jure territory. This included Crimea, which has been occupied by Russia since 2014. Crimea was reorganized from 14 raions and 11 municipalities into 10 raions, with municipalities abolished altogether. Saky Raion was abolished, with its territories to become a part of Yevpatoria Raion, but this has not yet been implemented due to the ongoing Russian occupation.

== Demographics ==
As of the 2001 Ukrainian census, the raion had a population of 80,964. Russians account for a little less than half the population, while Ukrainians make up a bit more than 30% of the population, followed by Crimean Tatars and Belarusians.

Ethnic groups (self-reported)
	percent
Russians	45.2%
Ukrainians	31.5%
Crimean Tatars	17.5%
Belarusians	2.2%
Tatars	0.8%
Armenians	0.5%
Germans	0.2%
Chuvashs	0.2%
Mordvins	0.2%
Uzbeks	0.2%
Poles	0.2%
Moldovans	0.2%
Azerbaijanis	0.1%

== Notable people ==
- Ihor Bondarenko (born 1964), Ukrainian politician
- Serhiy Kuznetsov (born 1950), Ukrainian footballer
- Viktor Kuznetsov (born 1949), Ukrainian football player and coach
- Ivan Ponomarenko, (born 1988), Ukrainian footballer
