= Piatykhatka =

Village in Crimea, Ukraine

Piatykhatka П'ятихатка
- Village
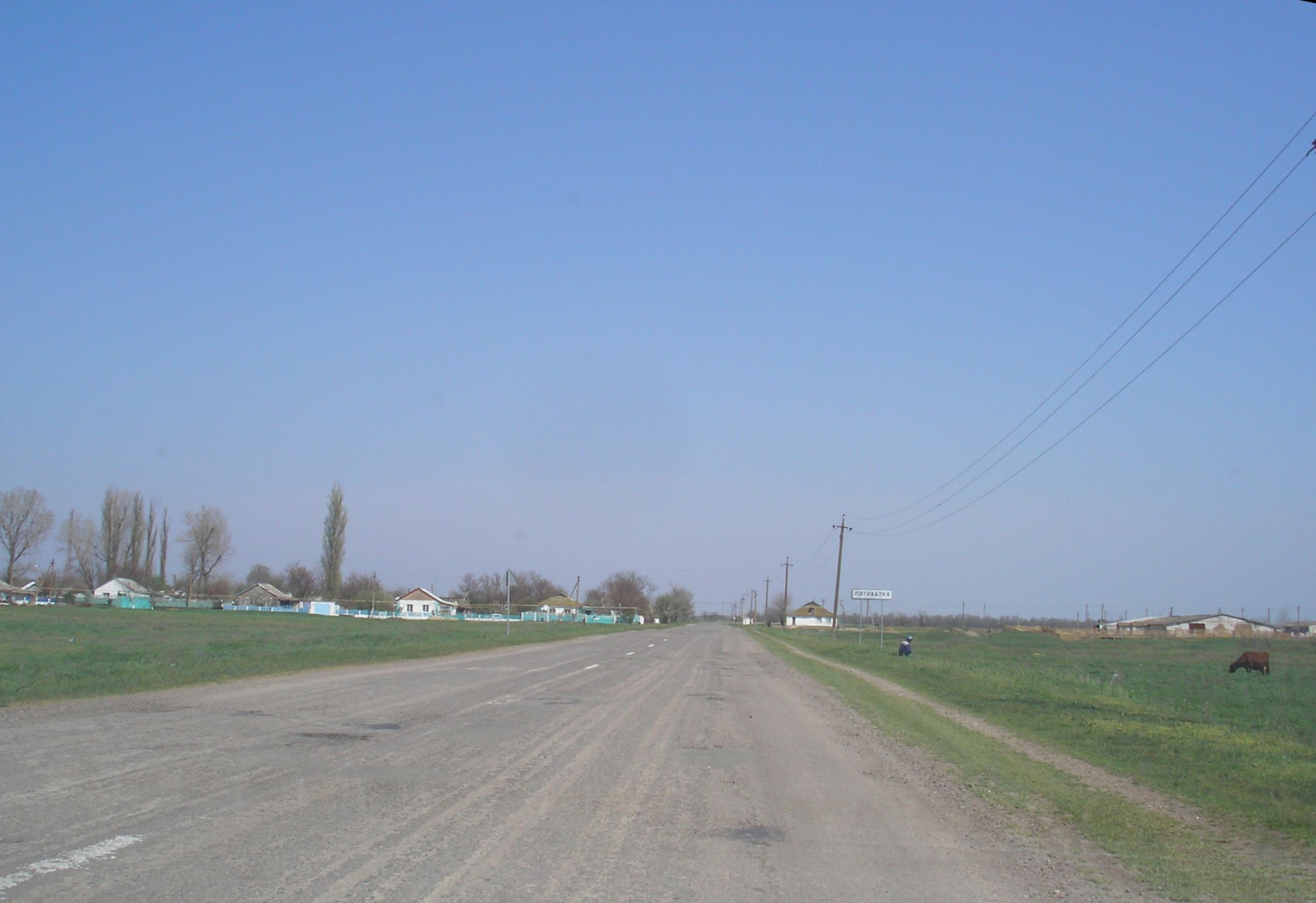

- Location within Crimea Location within Ukraine
- Coordinates: 46°02′59″N 33°45′18″E
- Country: Ukraine (occupied by Russia)
- Republic: Autonomous Republic of Crimea
- Raion: Krasnoperekopsk Raion

Government
  - Mayor (2010): Maryna Ivanivna Knyha

Area
  - Total: 0.42 km^{2} (0.16 sq mi)
- Elevation: 7 m (23 ft)

Population (2001)
  - Total: 635
  - Density: 1,500/km^{2} (3,900/sq mi)
- Time zone: UTC+2 (EET)
  - Summer (DST): UTC+3 (EEST)
- Postal code: 96021
- Area code: +380 6565
- Vehicle registration: AK/KK/01

Piatykhatka (Ukrainian: П'ятихатка; Russian: Пятихатка; Crimean Tatar: Pâtihatka), is a village in the Krasnoperekopsk Raion, Autonomous Republic of Crimea, Ukraine. The settlement came under Russian occupation in 2014, and was unilaterally annexed by the Russian Federation, after conducting what was vastly considered to be a sham referendum. According to the 2001 Ukrainian Census, the settlement counted a population of 635 inhabitants.

== Geography ==
Piatykhatka is located in the central portion of the Isthmus of Perekop on the northern edge of the Crimean peninsula and the Krasnoperekopsk raion. The district capital of Krasnoperekopsk is located 11 km (6.8 mi) to the south, while Armiansk is located 8 km (5 mi) to the northwest. The settlement has access to the M-17 Highway, which is connecting Kherson and Kerch.

== History ==
The settlement was founded in 1887 by Ukrainian settlers. In the following years, the population of the village experienced rapid growth, and increased to 92 people in 1926.

== Demographics ==
As of the 2001 Ukrainian census, the settlement had a population of 635 inhabitants, a slight increase from 598 in 1989. The exact native language composition was as follows:

Native languages in Piatykhatka
	percent
Ukrainian	61.4%
Russian	31.0%
Crimean Tatar	6.1%
Romanian	0.2%
Belarusian	0.2%
others	1.1%

=== Historical population data ===
As of the 1926 Soviet census, the settlement consisted of 19 farmsteads and counted a population of 92 residents. 87 residents were ethnic Ukrainians, while 5 were Russians.

1926 Soviet census (by ethnicity)
	percent
Ukrainians	94.57%
Russians	5.43%
others	0.00%
