= Oleksandr Nechaiev =

Ukrainian politician and businessman (born 1963)

- Олександр Нечаєв
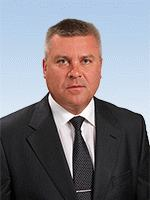
- An official portrait of him from 2012.

People's Deputy of Ukraine
- In office 27 November 2014 – 29 August 2019
- Constituency: Opposition Bloc, No. 26 (party list)
- In office 12 December 2012 – 27 November 2014
- Constituency: Autonomous Republic of Crimea, No. 9

Personal details
- Born: Oleksandr Igorevich Nechaiev; 21 February 1964 (age 62) Kiev, Ukrainian SSR, Soviet Union (now Kyiv, Ukraine)
- Party: Party of Regions (2012-2014); Opposition Bloc (2014-2019)
- Education: Kyiv Polytechnic Institute (1986)

Vladyslav Valentinovich Lukianov (Ukrainian: Олександр Ігоревич Нечаєв; born 21 February 1964) is a Ukrainian politician and businessman who served as a People's Deputy of Ukraine in the Verkhovna Rada from 2012 to 2019. During the 2014 Russian annexation of Crimea, he sided with Ukraine over Russia, despite his constituency being within Crimea. Previously, he was the director of Crimean Titan from 2007 to 2010, and then its parent company SJSC "TITAN" from 2010 to 2012.

== Early life ==
Nechaiev was born on 15 June 1963 in the city of Kiev (now Kyiv), which was then part of the Ukrainian SSR in the Soviet Union. After graduating from the Kyiv Polytechnic Institute in the Faculty of Instrument Engineering in 1986, he began working as an engineer and later as a leading designer at the historic Arsenal Factory in Kyiv. Nechaiev worked there for five more years until the collapse of the Soviet Union, when he then engaged in scientific work at the Institute of Physical and Applied Problems of the Academy of Sciences of Ukraine. In 2003, he moved to the city of Kremenchuk to work as the commercial director of AutoKrAZ, but only stayed there for a year. He moved to northern Crimea in 2004 when he was appointed commercial director of the Crimean Soda Plant in Krasnoperekopsk.

== Business activities ==
In June 2007, the shareholders of the titanium dioxide pigment enterprise Crimean Titan, which is located in Armiansk, Crimea, appointed Nechaiev as director. He replaced the former director, Yevgeny Dmitriev. It was reported that the change was because of a conflict with the German-based company RSJ Erste (founded by Robert Shetler‑Jones and controlled by oligarch Dmitry Firtash), which owned a 50+1 share of the company, and Dmitriev over the conclusions of an audit commission which found offshore companies and abuses of management. This led the then Prime Minister, Viktor Yanukovych to tell the State Property Fund of Ukraine to remove Dmitriev. Shortly after becoming director, Nechaiev officially appealed to the Prosecutor's Office of Crimea to request criminal investigations into the alleged asset stripping of the Sivash Aniline-Dye Plant (SAKZ) between 2004 and 2006, which Titan had purchased a 93% stake in. In 2010, Nechaiev was moved to become director of the parent company of Crimean Titan, SJSC "TITAN". He left the position upon being appointed a people's deputy in 2012.

== Political career ==
=== 2012-2014: First term in the Verkhovna Rada ===
In 2012, before the 2012 Ukrainian parliamentary elections, Nechaiev announced his intentions to run in the elections for a seat in the Verkhovna Rada within constituency No. 9 with the Party of Regions. At the time of its formation in 2012, the 9th district consisted of the cities of Armiansk and Krasnoperekopsk, as well as its surrounding municipalities. In the end, he won the election with 58.07% of the vote against competitors from the Communist Party of Ukraine (CPU) and Batkivshchyna candidates. According to analysts, he was elected as part of the so-called "gas lobby" that was led by the Firtash and Serhiy Lyovochkin group. Upon joining the Rada, he immediately joined the Party of Regions and was appointed as a member of the Committee on Industrial and Investment Policy.

=== Russian annexation of Crimea ===
Shortly after the 2014 Russian annexation of Crimea, Nechaiev said that he would not resign his mandate and expressed his beliefs that the referendum for the annexation contradicted both Ukrainian and international law. In addition, he said that it did not correspond to the real beliefs of residents in Crimea since it took place with violations. By July, he began distancing himself from the Party of Regions, and said that he would try to account for both positions, as he did not want to be blacklisted from Crimea, and that he would not comment on the new politics within Crimea. However, he also said that Ukraine must provide for Crimean businesses that had come under the jurisdiction of Russia. This was mainly linked to his wanting a continued water supply to Crimean Titan, despite it not being under Ukrainian control, and he even wrote a letter to Petro Poroshenko demanding the North Crimean Canal be resumed.

=== 2014-2019: Second term in the Verkhovna Rada ===
In the snap 2014 Ukrainian parliamentary elections, Nechaiev ran for re-election, but this time from the party list of the Opposition Bloc, on which he was placed at No. 26. He was thus successfully elected, and he immediately joined their faction and became a member of the Committee on Industrial Policy and Entrepreneurship. During his second term, Nechaiev promoted the usage of the Russian language in Ukraine, and said that it was impossible to force people in eastern Ukraine to speak the Ukrainian language, and that Ukraine should give people the right to speak the language they wish. In addition, Nechaiev said that the conflict in Crimea developed because of the imposition of the Ukrainian language on people, when they were more used to speaking Ukrainian. In 2019, during the debate on the Law of Ukraine "On protecting the functioning of the Ukrainian language as the state language", Nechaiev voted against the law and signed the petition to the Constitutional Court of Ukraine on the legality of it. He did not run for re-election in the subsequent 2019 Ukrainian parliamentary elections.

== Personal life ==
He is married and has a daughter.

== Honours and awards ==
Neechaiev has been awarded the following honours:

- Order of Merit, III degree
