= Ukraine's 9th electoral district =

Ukrainian electoral district

- Electoral district for the Verkhovna Rada
- Region: Autonomous Republic of Crimea
- Population: 144,121

Current Electoral district
- Created: 2012
Party
Vacant

Ukraine's 9th electoral district is a Verkhovna Rada constituency in the Autonomous Republic of Crimea. Established in its current form in 2012, it includes the cities of Armiansk and Krasnoperekopsk, as well as Chornomorske Raion, Krasnoperekopsk Raion, Pervomaiske Raion, and Rozdolne Raion. The constituency is home to 144,121 registered voters, and has 151 polling stations. Since the Annexation of Crimea by the Russian Federation in 2014, the seat has been vacant.

The constituency is surrounded by the 4th district to the south, the 3rd district to the east, the Karkinit Bay to the north, and the Black Sea to the west.

== People's Deputies ==
Party	Member	Portrait	Election
Party of Regions	Oleksandr Nechaiev		2012
Vacant			2014
Vacant			2019

== Elections ==
=== 2012 ===
2012 Ukrainian parliamentary election
Party	Candidate	Votes	%
Party of Regions	Oleksandr Nechayev	42,873	58.1%
KPU	Ella Tolochko	7,063	9.6%
Batkivshchyna	Ihor Lesiv	5,957	8.1%
UDAR	Volodymyr Melnyk	3,758	5.1%
Independent	Yevhenia Anelikova	1,955	2.6%
Independent	Oleh Hryva	1,442	2.0%
Party of Greens	Natalia Andreyeva	1,407	1.9%
People's	Oleksandr Lyashenko	1,192	1.6%
Independent	Serhiy Kuliesha	1,158	1.6%
Justice Party	Ivan Zharikov	825	1.1%
Others		6,196	8.4%
Total votes		73,826	100.0%
Party of Regions win (new seat)			

== See also ==
- Electoral districts of Ukraine
- Foreign electoral district of Ukraine
