= Filativka =

Settlement in Crimea, Ukraine

Filativka Філатівка
- Urban-type settlement
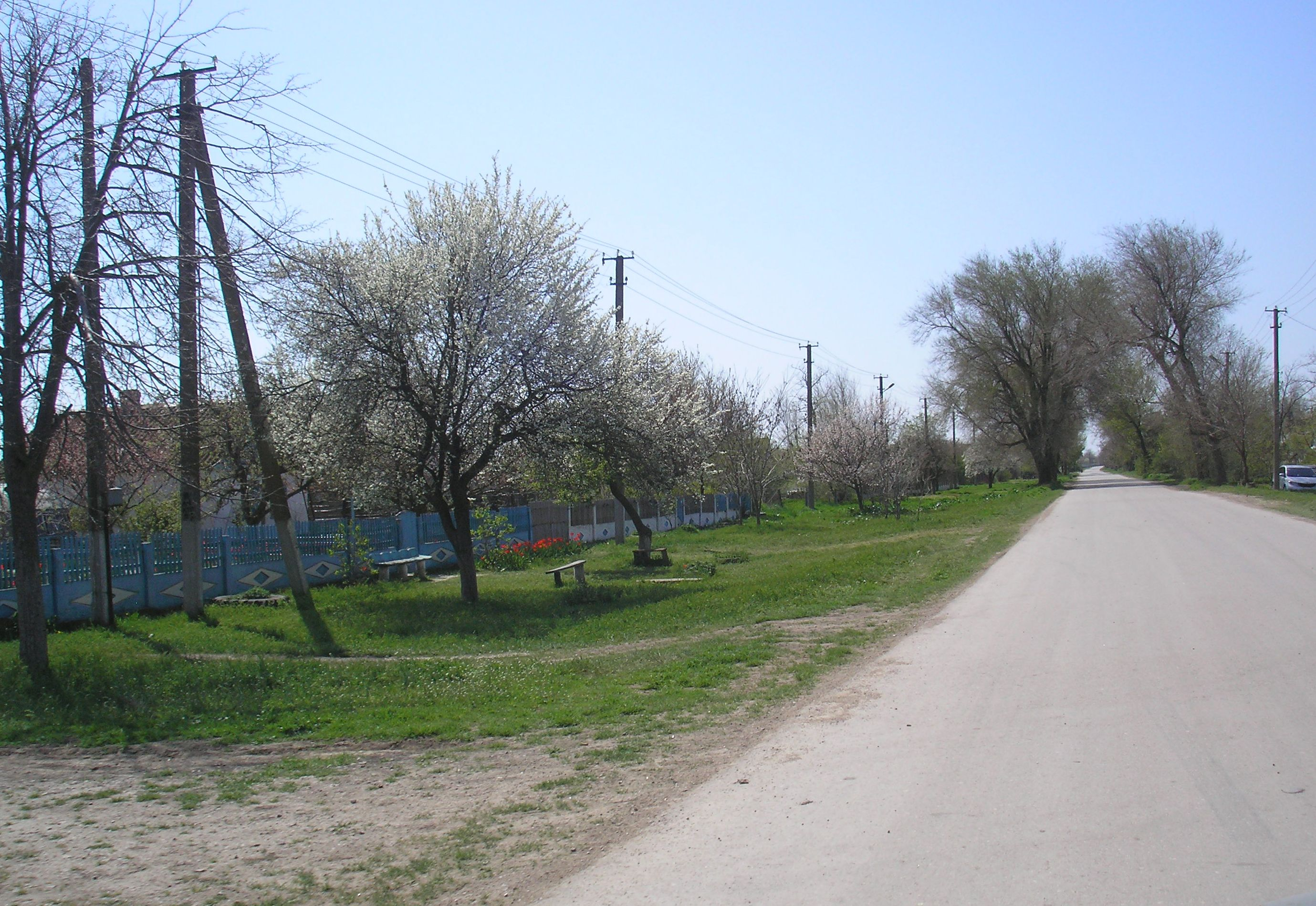

- Location within Crimea Location within Ukraine
- Coordinates: 46°04′52″N 33°47′04″E
- Country: Ukraine
- Republic: Autonomous Republic of Crimea
- Raion: Krasnoperekopsk Raion

Government
  - Mayor: Yuriy Adamovych Koshchuk

Area
  - Total: 0.46 km^{2} (0.18 sq mi)
- Elevation: 10 m (33 ft)

Population (2001)
  - Total: 1,121
  - Density: 2,400/km^{2} (6,300/sq mi)
- Time zone: UTC+2 (EET)
  - Summer (DST): UTC+3 (EEST)
- Postal code: 96017
- Area code: +380 6565
- Vehicle registration: AK/KK/01
- Control: Russia

Filativka (Ukrainian: Філатівка; Russian: Филатовка; Crimean Tatar: Filatovka), is a village in the Krasnoperekopsk Raion, Autonomous Republic of Crimea, southern Ukraine. Along with the rest of the Crimean peninsula, the settlement was occupied and subsequently annexed by the Russian Federation in early 2014.

== Geography ==
The village is located on the northernmost part of the Crimean peninsula, and has access to the shores of the Rotten Sea. Armiansk is situated 7 km to the northwest, Krasnoperekopsk 13 km to the south. Due to its geographical location, salt production and trade has been a significant part of the local economy.

== History ==
The settlement was mentioned for the first time in a document in 1915, when the region was part of the Russian Empire, which administered the region under the Taurida Governorate. As of the first Soviet census in 1926, the village had a population of 103 inhabitants, of whom 99 were ethnic Ukrainians, while the rest consisted of one single Belarusian, Russian, Latvian and Czech person respectively. Following the failed 1991 Soviet coup attempt, a majority of Crimean population voted to become part of an independent Ukrainian state. Following the Revolution of Dignity in 2014, Russian military forces invaded and occupied Crimea, and subsequently conducted a highly disputed referendum, which would result in the unilateral annexation of Crimea by the Russian Federation.

== Demographics ==
As of Ukraine's national census in 2001, Filativka had a population of 1,121 people. The linguistic structure of the population is diverse, since half of the ethnic Ukrainian population living on the Crimean peninsula speaks the Russian language natively. The exact linguistic composition of the settlement was as follows:

Native languages in Filativka
	percent
Russian	49.1%
Ukrainian	29.0%
Crimean Tatar	16.4%
Romanian	3.1%
Belarusian	0.9%
Gagauz	0.2%
others	1.3%

== Historical population data ==
As of the 1926 Soviet census, Filativka had a population of 103 people, of whom all were peasants. The ethnic composition was as follows:.

1926 census (by ethnicity)
	percent
Ukrainians	96.12%
Belarusians	0.97%
Russians	0.97%
Latvians	0.97%
Czechs	0.97%
others	0.00%

== Notable people ==
- Vadym Mashchenko (born 2000), Ukrainian football player
