= Voinka =

Urban-type settlement in Crimea, Ukraine

Voinka Воїнка
- Urban-type settlement
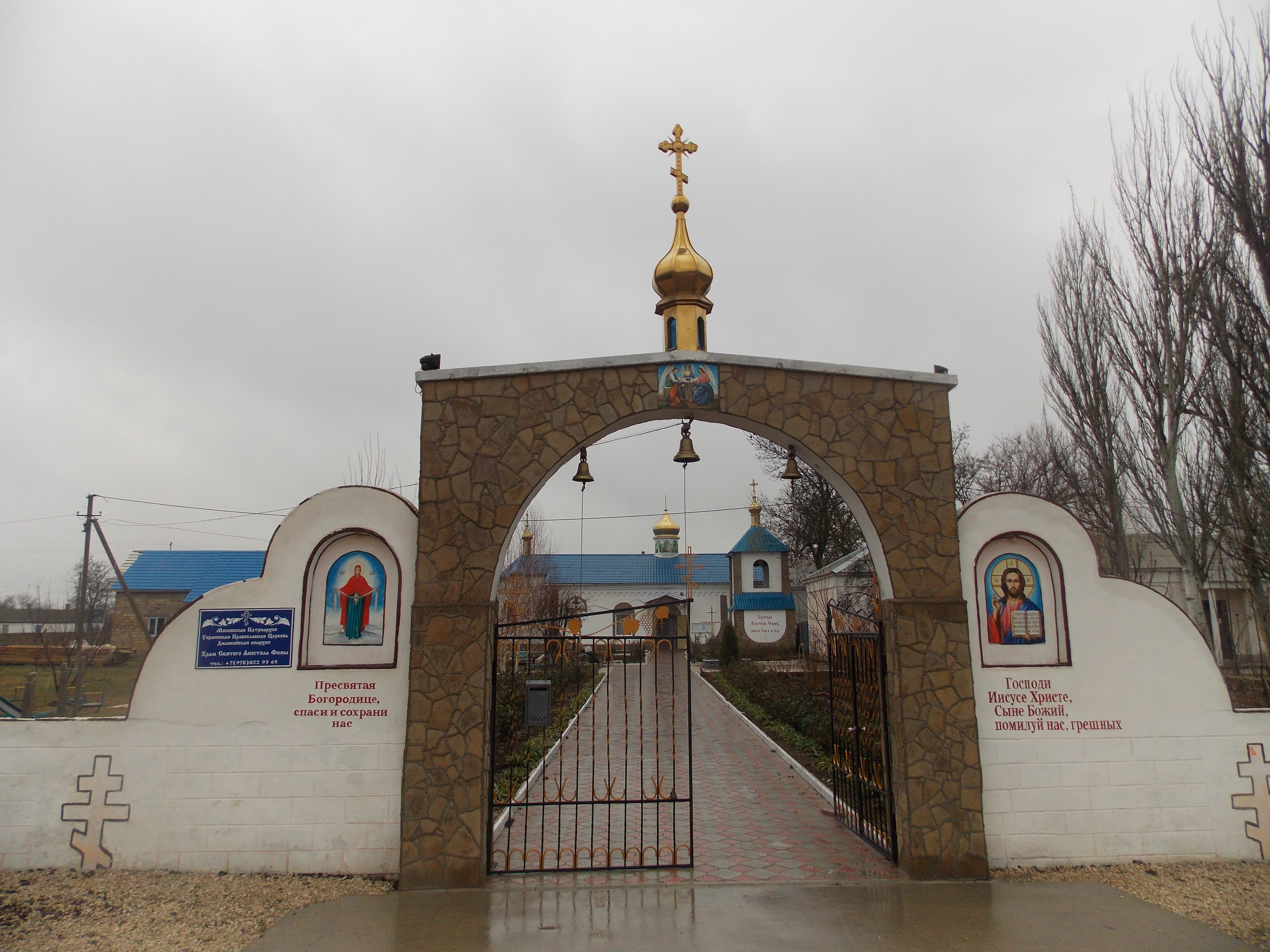

- Location within Crimea Location within Ukraine
- Coordinates: 45°52′14″N 33°59′20″E
- Country: Ukraine
- Autonomous republic: Autonomous Republic of Crimea
- Raion: Krasnoperekopsk Raion (de facto)
- Silrada: Voinka Village Council

Government
  - Mayor: Oleksandr Tunda

Area
  - Total: 3.17 km^{2} (1.22 sq mi)
- Elevation: 15 m (49 ft)

Population (2001)
  - Total: 4,392
  - Density: 1,390/km^{2} (3,590/sq mi)
- Time zone: UTC+2 (EET)
  - Summer (DST): UTC+3 (EEST)
- Postal code: 96033
- Area code: +380 6565
- Vehicle registration: AK/KK/01
- Control: Russia

Voinka (Ukrainian: Воїнка; Russian: Воинка; Crimean Tatar: Voinka), also known as Voyinka, is a settlement in the Krasnoperekopsk Raion (district) of the Autonomous Republic of Crimea, Ukraine, which is currently occupied and administered by the Russian Federation. It is the administrative center of the Voinka Village Council.

== Geography ==
The settlement is located in the southeast of the Krasnoperekopsk Raion on the M17 highway. The district center Krasnoperekopsk (Yany Kapu) is 16 kilometers away.

== History ==
The settlement was established in 1885 as a place of settlement for retired soldiers of the Russian Imperial Army under the Russian name of Voinka. In 1926, the population reached 834 people, out of whom 755 were Russians, 43 Ukrainians, 20 Jews, while 5 inhabitants had a different ethnic background.

In 2023, Ukraine de jure implemented an administrative reform in Crimea that places Voinka within the newly formed Perekop Raion. In 2024, urban-type settlements were abolished and recategorized as rural settlements. Both of these changes are not de facto in place as they are not recognized by the Russian government.

== Demographics ==
As of the Ukrainian census in 2001, Voinka had a population of 4,392 inhabitants, which made it the largest settlement within the boundaries of the Krasnoperekopsk Raion. Despite the settlement's population mostly being Russophone, it is estimated that the town's population respective ethnic Ukrainian, Russian and Crimean Tatar populations are roughly of equal size, while also a large Romani community, as well as small Belarusian and Armenian minorities can be found. The linguistic composition of the settlement was as follows:

Native languages in Voyinka
	percent
Russian	49.7%
Crimean Tatar	28.8%
Ukrainian	11.3%
Romani	5.6%
Belarusian	0.7%
Armenian	0.3%
Romanian	0.1%
others	0.6%

== Notable people ==
- Mariya Bayda (1922–2002), Ukrainian politician and Soviet war veteran
- Yevheniya Vysotska (born 1978), Ukrainian racing cyclist and olympic athlete
