= Armiansk Municipality =

Armiansk City Municipality Армянська міськрада
- Municipality
- Location within Crimea
- Coordinates: 46°6′26.54″N 33°41′30.9″E
- Country (de jure): Ukraine
- Republic: Autonomous Republic of Crimea
- Country (de facto): Russia
- Federal Subject (de facto): (Autonomous Republic of Crimea) Republic of Crimea
- Region: Armiansk Municipality
- Capital: Armiansk
- Subdivisions: List: 1 cities; 0 towns; 3 villages

Area
  - Total: 162 km^{2} (63 sq mi)

Population (2014)
  - Total: 24,415
  - Density: 151/km^{2} (390/sq mi)
- Time zone: UTC+3 (MSK)
- Dialing code: +380-6567
- Website: armyansk.rk.gov.ru
- ^{1} Autonomous Republic of Crimea (de jure) or Republic of Crimea (de facto), depending on jurisdiction.

Armiansk City Municipality (Russian: Армянский горсовет, Ukrainian: Армянська міськрада, romanized: Armianska miskrada, Crimean Tatar: Ermeni Bazar şeer şurası) is an administrative territorial entity of the Autonomous Republic of Crimea. Population: 24,415 (2014 Census).

It is one of the smallest regions of the republic, located on the Isthmus of Perekop and is the main part of the peninsula that connects to mainland Ukraine.

== Economy and Industry ==
The main employer in the city and the area is Crimean Titan (Russian: Крымский Титан ; Ukrainian Кримський Титан ), which specializes in the refining of Titanium dioxide for use in paints, plastics, and other products.

== Administrative divisions ==
Within the framework of administrative divisions of Russia, Armiansk is, together with a number of rural localities, incorporated separately as the town of republican significance of Armiansk—an administrative unit with the status equal to that of the districts. As a municipal division, the town of republican significance of Armiansk is incorporated as Armiansk Urban Okrug.

Within the framework of administrative divisions of Ukraine, Armiansk is incorporated as the town of republican significance of Armiansk. Ukraine does not have municipal divisions different from the administrative ones: local government in Ukraine is part of the state governmental hierarchy.

The region includes the city of Armiansk and 3 villages (Crimean Tatar names are mentioned in brackets):

- Suvorove (Culğa)
- Voloshyne (Qulla)
- Perekop (Or Qapı)

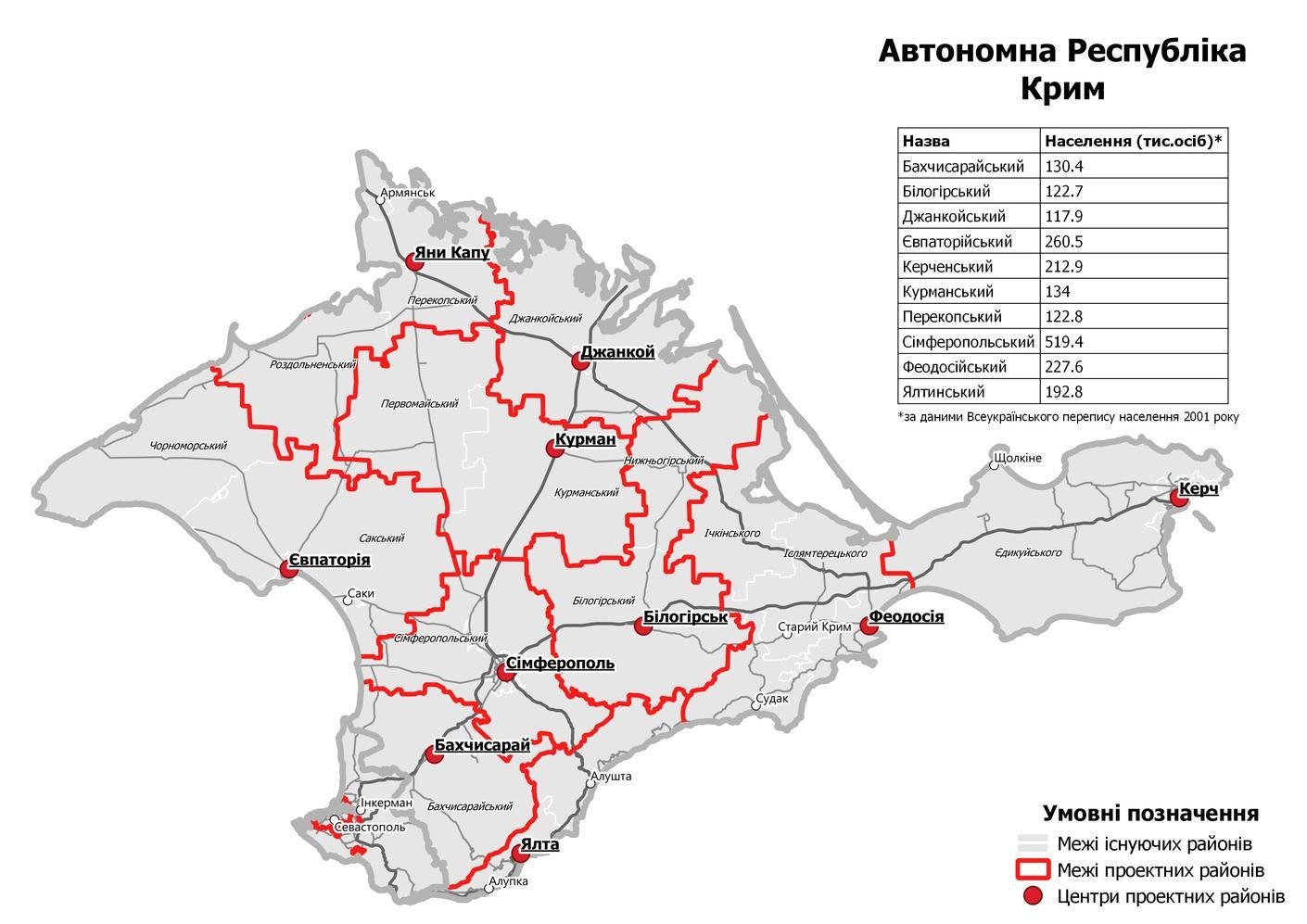
In July 2020, the Verkhovna Rada approved an administrative reform in Crimea

=== 2020 Ukrainian administrative reform ===
In July 2020, Ukraine conducted an administrative reform throughout its de jure territory. This included Crimea, which was at the time (and still is as of 2026) occupied by Russia. Crimea was reorganized from 14 raions and 11 municipalities into 10 raions, with municipalities abolished altogether.

Armiansk Municipality was abolished, and its territories are to become a part of Perekop Raion, but this has not yet been implemented due to the ongoing Russian occupation.
