= Voloshyne =

Voloshyne (Ukrainian: Волошине) may refer to the following places in Ukraine:

- Voloshyne, Crimea
- Voloshyne, Zhytomyr Oblast
