= Suvorove =

Surorove (Ukrainian: Суворове) may refer to the following places in Ukraine:

Crimea

- Suvorove, Armyansk Municipality, Crimea
- Suvorove, Bakhchysarai Raion, Crimea

Elsewhere

- Suvorove, Donetsk Oblast
- Suvorove, Sumy Oblast
