= As, Ukraine =

Village in Crimea, Ukraine

As Ac
- Village
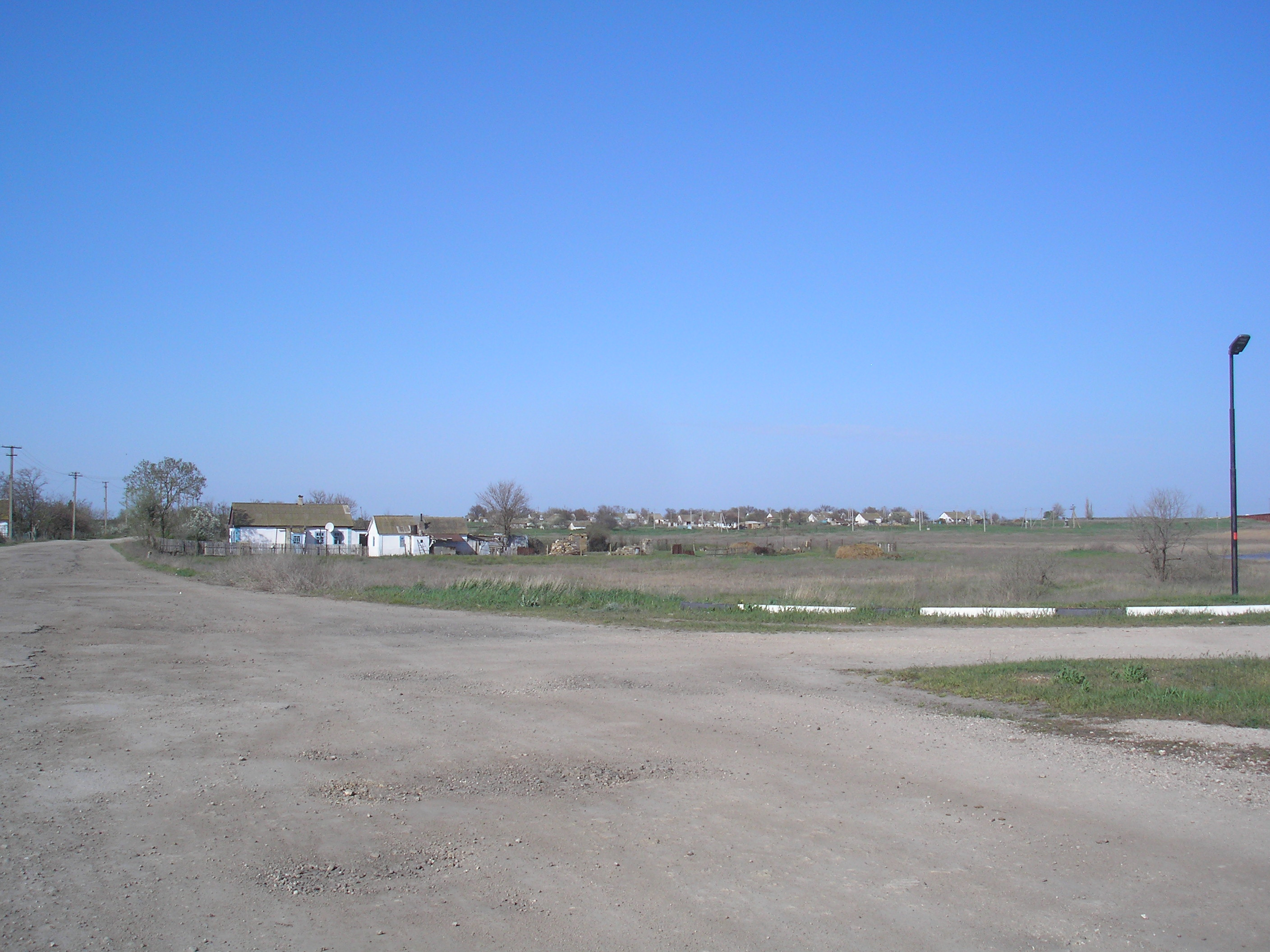

- Location within Crimea Location within Ukraine
- Coordinates: 45°58′57″N 33°50′20″E
- Country: Ukraine (occupied by Russia)
- Republic: Autonomous Republic of Crimea
- Raion: Krasnoperekopsk Raion

Government
  - Mayor (2010): Hanna Borysivna Martyniuk

Area
  - Total: 0.57 km^{2} (0.22 sq mi)
- Elevation: 2 m (6.6 ft)

Population (2001)
  - Total: 222
  - Density: 390/km^{2} (1,000/sq mi)
- Time zone: UTC+2 (EET)
  - Summer (DST): UTC+3 (EEST)
- Postal code: 96002
- Area code: +380 6565
- Vehicle registration: AK/KK/01

As (Ukrainian: Ac; Crimean Tatar: As; Russian: Ac), until 2023 Proletarka, is a village in the Krasnoperekopsk Raion, Autonomous Republic of Crimea, Ukraine. Since 2014 the town has been occupied and unilaterally annexed by the Russian Federation. According to the 2001 Ukrainian Census, the settlement counted a population of 222 inhabitants.

== Geography ==
It is located on the shores of the Syvash in the northern part of the Crimean peninsula and 4 kilometers northeast from the district capital of Krasnoperekopsk.

== History ==
The settlement was firstly mentioned in records dating back to the year of 1784, in which it was and described as a Crimean Tatar village named "Ass", which counted 161 inhabitants in 1805. Following the Crimean War between 1853 and 1856, which resulted in a large exodus of the Crimean Tatar population, the village became abandoned, and was only reinhabited in the following years, when ethnic Ukrainians, who were moving into the surrounding deserted Tatar villages, reestablished the settlement. As of the first Soviet census in 1926, the authorities recorded a population of 34 people, out of whom 32 were Ukrainians, while the remainder of the population consisted of one respective Greek and a Crimean Tatar person. In 1948, Ass was per decree renamed to Proletarka, but regained its original name in 2023, when the Ukrainian parliament passed a legislation, which aimed at renaming Crimean settlements with Soviet toponymy as part of a nationwide decommunization effort.

== Demographics ==
According to the 2001 Ukrainian census, the village had a population of 222 inhabitants. The native language composition was as follows:

Native language composition of As (formerly Proletarka)
| | percent |
| Ukrainian | 82.4% |
| Russian | 15.8% |
| Crimean Tatar | 0.5% |
| others | 1.4% |

=== Historical population data ===
Ethnic groups in the settlement as of the 1926 Soviet census:

1926 census
| | percent |
| Ukrainians | 94.12% |
| Greeks | 2.94% |
| Crimean Tatars | 2.94% |
| others | 0.00% |
