= Bratske, Crimea =

Settlement in Crimea, Ukraine

Bratske Братське
- Urban-type settlement
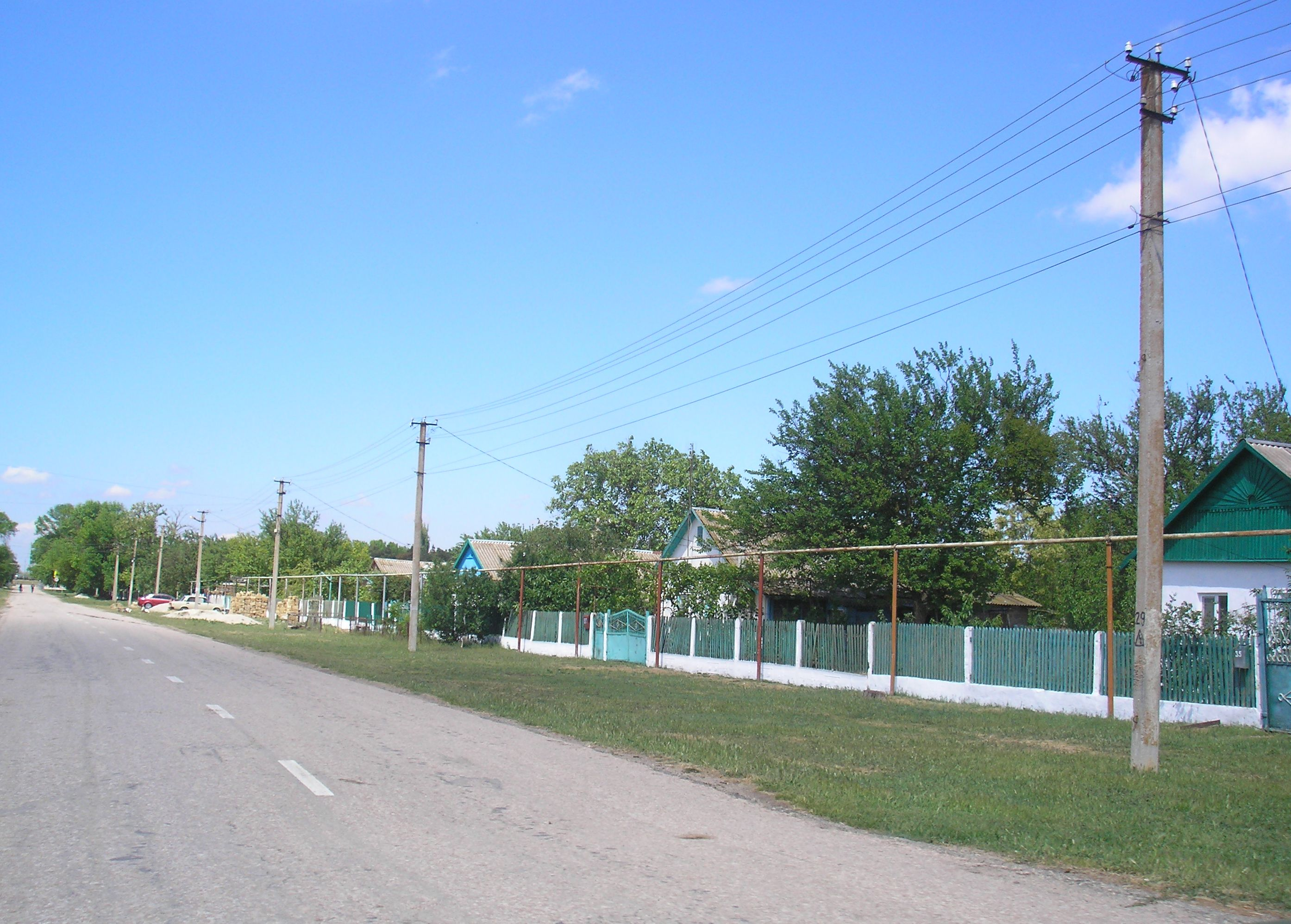

- Location within Crimea Location within Ukraine
- Coordinates: 45°49′56″N 33°55′17″E
- Country: Ukraine
- Republic: Autonomous Republic of Crimea
- Raion: Krasnoperekopsk Raion

Government
  - Mayor: Iryna Maksymivna Melnychuk

Area
  - Total: 0.70 km^{2} (0.27 sq mi)
- Elevation: 10 m (33 ft)

Population (2001)
  - Total: 1,160
  - Density: 1,700/km^{2} (4,300/sq mi)
- Time zone: UTC+2 (EET)
  - Summer (DST): UTC+3 (EEST)
- Postal code: 96050
- Area code: +380 6565
- Vehicle registration: AK/KK/01
- Control: Russia

Bratske (Ukrainian: Братське; Russian: Братскoе; Crimean Tatar: Yalan Tuş), is an urban-type settlement in Krasnoperekopsk Raion, Autonomous Republic of Crimea, Ukraine. Bratske came under Russian military occupation in early 2014, and was subsequently annexed by the Russian Federation. As of the 2001 Ukrainian national census, the settlement had a population of 1,060 inhabitants.

== Geography ==
The settlement is situated in the southern part of Crimea's northern Krasnoperekopsk district and 17 km southeast of the district capital of Krasnoperekopsk. The closest regional center is Pervomaiske, which is located 14 km to the southwest.

== History ==
The settlement was mentioned for the first time in the year of 1784 and was mostly inhabited by Crimean Tatars and ethnic Germans, which arrived in the mid-1840s. After both groups were ethnically cleansed from the region in the early 1940s, Ukrainian and Russian settlers from mainland Ukraine and Russia started to populate the village. Following the Revolution of Dignity in 2014, unmarked Russian troops started to occupy the Crimean peninsula. After conducted a highly disputed referendum, which was vastly considered to be a sham vote, the entirety of Autonomous Republic of Crimea was incorporated into the Russian Federation, although the annexation remains internationally unrecognized.

== Demographics ==
As of Ukraine's national census in 2001, Bratske counted a population of 1,160 people. Most inhabitants speak Ukrainian as their primary language, while Russian and Crimean Tatar are spoken by large minorities. The exact linguistic composition of the village was as follows:

Native languages in Bratske
	percent
Ukrainian	43.0%
Russian	41.9%
Crimean Tatar	13.2%
Belarusian	0.7%
Romani	0.3%
Romanian	0.2%
Armenian	0.2%
others	0.5%
