= Vyshnivka, Crimea =

Village in Crimea, Ukraine

Vyshnivka Вишнівка
- Village
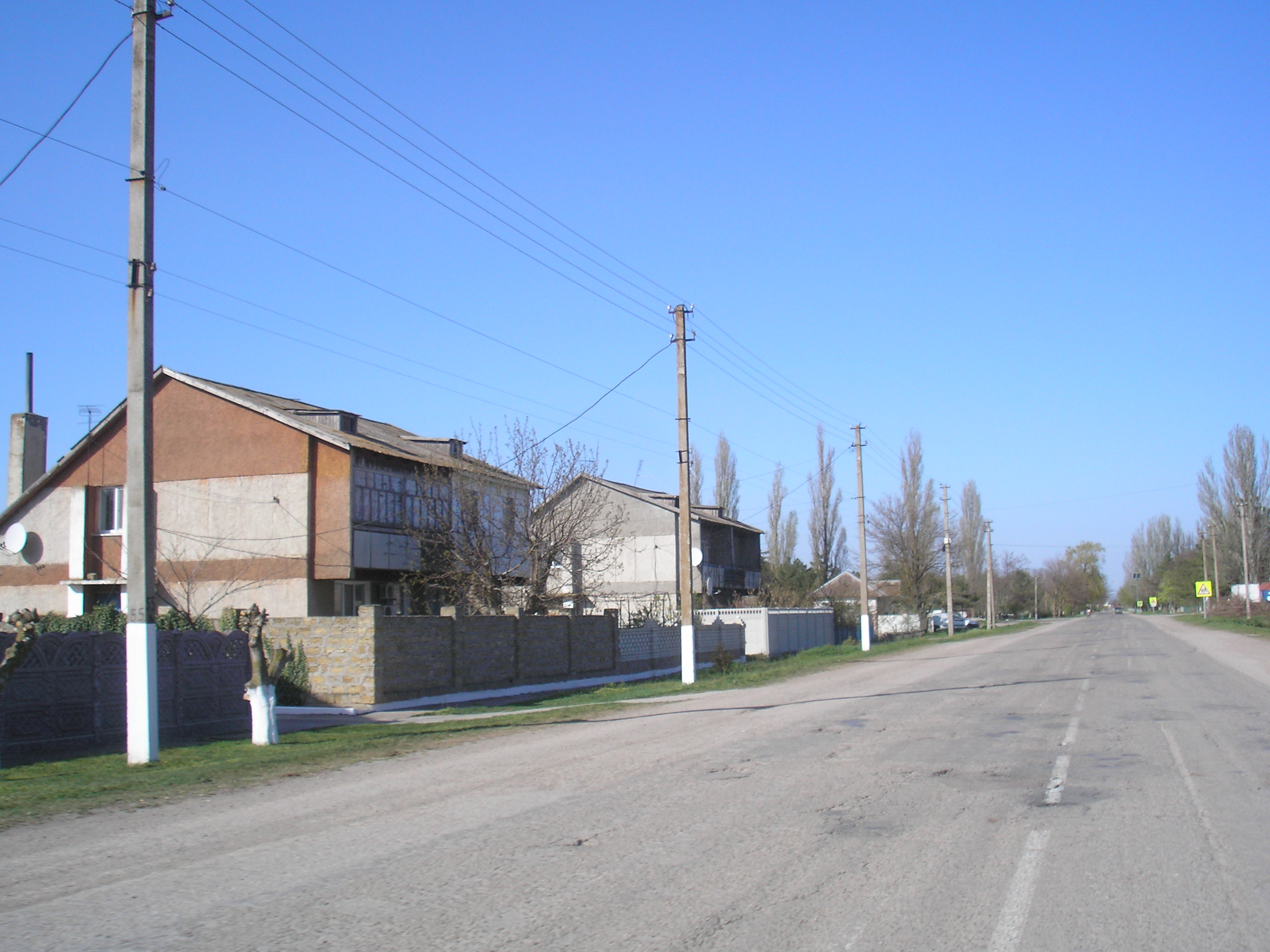

- Location within Crimea Location within Ukraine
- Coordinates: 45°57′42″N 33°57′15″E
- Country: Ukraine (occupied by Russia)
- Republic: Autonomous Republic of Crimea
- Raion: Krasnoperekopsk Raion

Government
  - Mayor (2013): Artur Anatoliyovych Marshal

Area
  - Total: 0.35 km^{2} (0.14 sq mi)
- Elevation: 5 m (16 ft)

Population (2001)
  - Total: 1,316
  - Density: 3,800/km^{2} (9,700/sq mi)
- Time zone: UTC+2 (EET)
  - Summer (DST): UTC+3 (EEST)
- Postal code: 96030
- Area code: +380 6565
- Vehicle registration: AK/KK/01

Vyshnivka (Ukrainian: Вишнівка; Russian: Вишнёвка; Crimean Tatar: Tarhan), until 1948 Tarhan, is a village in the Krasnoperekopsk Raion, Autonomous Republic of Crimea, Ukraine. The settlement came under Russian occupation in 2014, and was subsequently unilaterally annexed, following a highly disputed referendum, which was widely considered to be a sham vote.

== Geography ==
Vyshinivka is located in Crimea's northern Krasnoperekopsk district, right on the shores of the Syvash, which is also known as the Rotten Sea. The settlement is located 12 km east of Krasnoperekopsk.

== History ==
The village is popular for its historic excavation sites, where remains of settlements from the Neolithic period can be found. The most notable discovery was a stone statue of a Scythian warrior.

== Demographics ==
According to the Ukrainian national census in 2001, the village had a population of 1,316 people. The native language composition was as follows:

Native languages in Vyshnivka
	percent
Ukrainian	44.7%
Russian	41.9%
Crimean Tatar	10.1%
German	0.1%
Belarusian	0.1%
others	3.2%
