= Vadym Mashchenko =

Ukrainian footballer (born 2000)

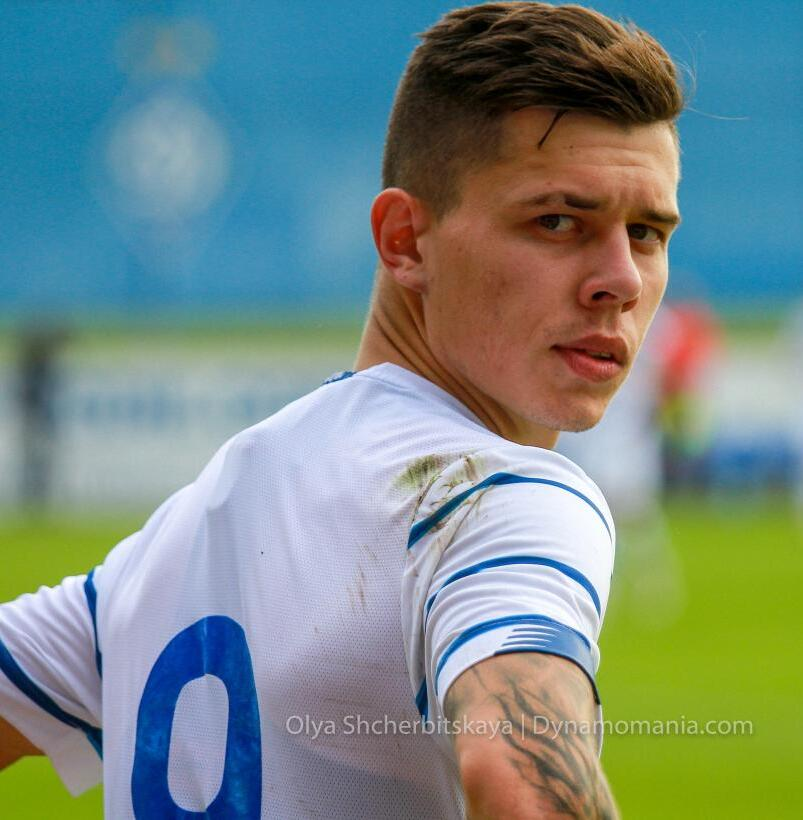

Personal information
- Full name: Vadym Serhiyovych Mashchenko
- Date of birth: 26 July 2000 (age 26)
- Place of birth: Filativka, AR Crimea, Ukraine
- Height: 1.85 m (6 ft 1 in)
- Position: Right winger

Team information
- Current team: Ogre United
- Number: 17

Youth career
- 2012–2013: Olimp Starobilsk
- 2013–2014: Zorya Luhansk
- 2014–2021: Dynamo Kyiv

Senior career*
Years	Team	Apps	(Gls)
2021–2022	Dynamo Kyiv	0	(0)
2021	→ Chornomorets Odesa (loan)	13	(0)
2022	→ Jonava (loan)	13	(1)
2023–2024	Jelgava	21	(3)
2024	Karpaty Krosno	15	(2)
2024	Humenné	10	(0)
2025–	Ogre United	52	(9)

International career
2016	Ukraine U16	4	(0)
2017–2018	Ukraine U17	6	(1)
- * Club domestic league appearances and goals as of 12 November 2026

Vadym Serhiyovych Mashchenko (Ukrainian: Вадим Сергійович Мащенко; born 26 July 2000) is a Ukrainian professional footballer who plays as a right winger for Latvian club Ogre United.

== Club career ==
=== Early years ===
Vadym Mashchenko started his career at Olimp from Starobilsk in 2012. The following year, he moved to the youth ranks of Zorya Luhansk.

=== Dynamo Kyiv ===
At the age of 14, he moved to the youth ranks of Dynamo Kyiv.

=== Chornomorets Odesa ===
In February 2021, he moved on loan to Chornomorets Odesa.

=== Baltic ===
In the summer of 2022, Mashchenko joined Lithuanian side Jonava on loan. He made his debut on 16 August 2022 in a LFF Cup match against FC Hegelmann.

Five days later, Mashchenko made his first A Lyga appearance in a 3–1 loss against Žalgiris. On 16 September 2022, he opened the scoring in a 2–1 loss against Kauno Žalgiris.

Ahead of the 2023 season, he was transferred to Latvian Higher League newcomers Jelgava.

=== Karpaty Krosno ===
On 27 February 2024, Mashchenko joined Polish fourth division side Karpaty Krosno.

=== Humenne ===
On 3 July 2024, he moved to Slovak 2. Liga club Humenné.
