= Yevheniya Vysotska =

Ukrainian cyclist

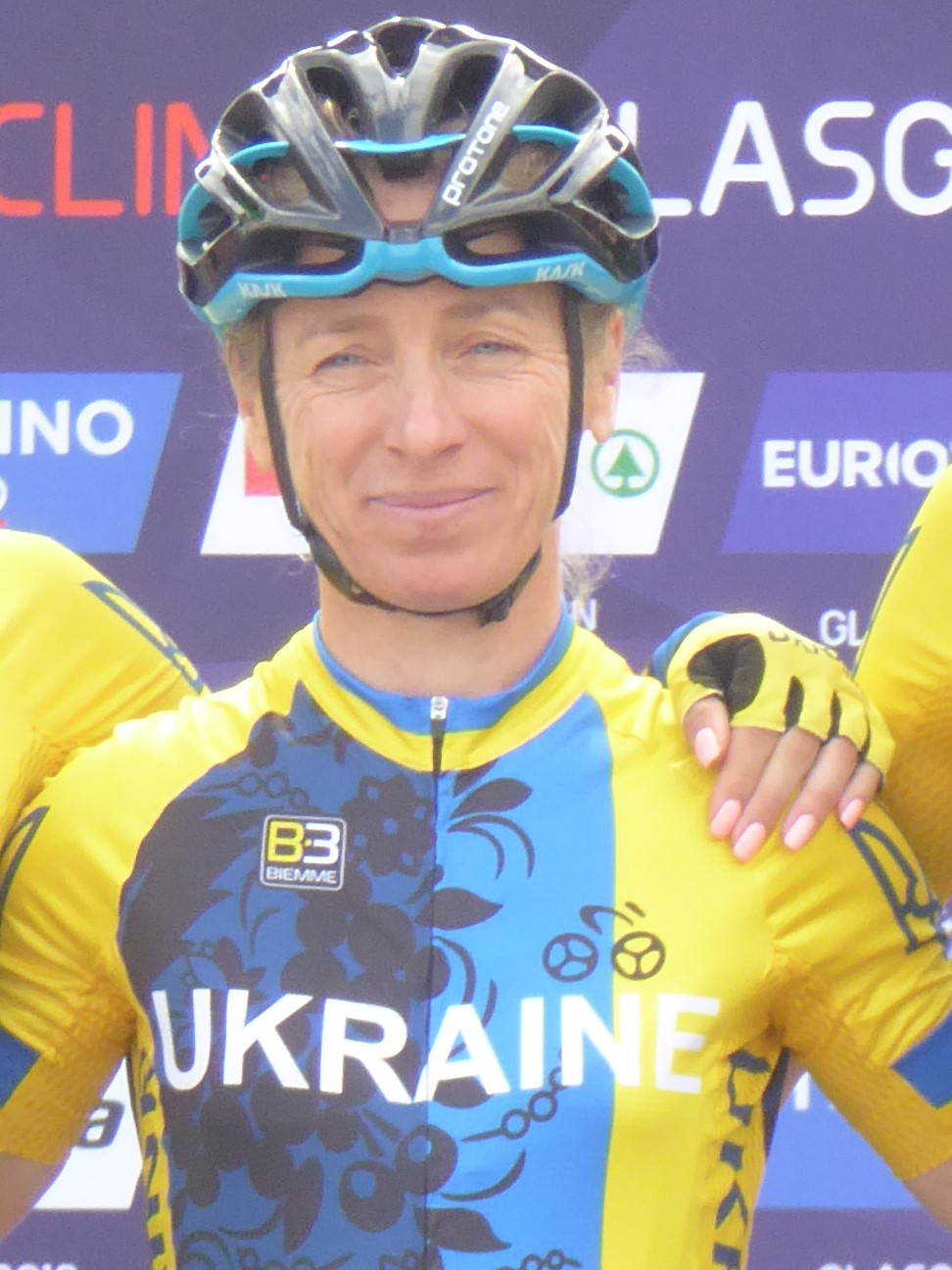
- Vysotska at the 2018 European Road Cycling Championships.

Personal information
- Full name: Yevheniya Petrivna Vysotska
- Born: 11 December 1975 (age 50) Voinka, Crimean Oblast, Soviet Union (now Ukraine)

Cycling career
- Sport: Cycling
- Discipline: Road
- Role: Rider

Professional teams
- 2010: Team Valdarno Umbria
- 2013–2014: S.C. Michela Fanini Rox
- 2015: Servetto Footon
- 2016: Hagens Berman–Supermint
- 2017: Conceria Zabri–Fanini–Guerciotti
- 2018: S.C. Michela Fanini Rox
- 2019: Servetto–Piumate–Beltrami TSA
- 2020: Lviv Cycling Team

Yevheniya Petrivna Vysotska (sometimes spelled as Yevgenia Visotskaya; Ukrainian: Євгенія Петрівна Висоцька; born 11 December 1975) is a Ukrainian racing cyclist, who most recently rode for UCI Women's Continental Team Lviv Cycling Team. She competed in the women's road race at the 2008 Summer Olympics.
