= Mariya Bayda =

Soviet medic and machine gunner (1922–2002)

Mariya Karpovna Bayda
- Мария Карповна Байда
- Born: 1 February 1922; Novy Chuvash, Krasnoperekopsk Raion, Crimea
- Died: 30 August 2002 (aged 80); Sevastopol, Ukraine
- Military career
- Allegiance: Soviet Union
- Branch: Red Army
- Service years: 1941–1945
- Rank: Senior Sergeant
- Unit: 172nd Rifle Division
- Wars: World War II
- Awards: Hero of the Soviet Union; Order of Bohdan Khmelnytsky, 3rd Class
- Other work: Civil Servant

Mariya Karpovna Bayda (Russian: Мария Карповна Байда; February 1, 1922 – August 30, 2002) was a Soviet medical orderly in the 514th Infantry Regiment during World War II who fought in Crimea. When she was surrounded by Wehrmacht submachine gunners, she fought a heated gun battle against them, killing fifteen, wounding several more, and routing the rest, escaping wounded. For her wartime exploits, Bayda was awarded the honorary title of Hero of the Soviet Union in 1942.

== Early life ==
Bayda was born in 1922 in a Russian family in the Krasnoperekopsk Raion of Crimea. After her parents died she was raised by her grandparents. In 1936 she dropped out of the school in Dzankoy without completing her studies. She worked on a state run farm, in a hospital, and then in a cooperative society in of the village of Voinka. After the house she lived in was bombed she began working at a train station to help civilians evacuate the city.

== Military career ==
In 1941 she joined the Red Army and was assigned as a nurse in the 3rd Battalion of 514th Rifle Regiment, 172nd Rifle Division of the Red Army of the North Caucasian front; she held the rank of senior sergeant and was deployed to the front lines that same year. In addition to providing first aid she dug trenches and captured German soldiers to be interrogated. In the autumn of 1941 she was transferred to a naval infantry battalion. Due to the unit's inadequate weaponry the Germans managed to take over a hill they had been defending, but after orders from the company commander they managed to retake control. After the regiment was later withdrawn Bayda was reassigned to the medical division of a reconnaissance unit.

On 7 June 1942 she earned the nickname "fearless Marusia" after she killed 16 enemy combatants, one of whom was an officer, with her submachine gun and attacked four more German soldiers by hitting them on the head with the butt of her rifle in order to rescue her commander and eight other soldiers who were captured by the Germans. For her actions that day she was awarded the title Hero of the Soviet Union on 20 June 1942.

On 12 July 1942 after being severely wounded in battle, Bayda was taken prisoner and sent to Slavuta concentration camp in Ukraine and later Ravensbruck after she was held in Simferopol. She was released from captivity by the American forces on 8 May 1945.

== Later life ==
After the war, she was discharged from military service. For many years, she headed the Sevastopol city department of civil registration, and she was repeatedly selected the deputy of city council. In 1976, she was recognized as an Honourable Citizen of Sevastopol.

Mariya died on August 30, 2002. She is buried in Sevastopol at the memorial cemetery of Communards.

== Awards ==
- Hero of the Soviet Union (20 June 1942)
- Order of Lenin (20 June 1942)
- Order of the Patriotic War 1st class (11 March 1985)
- campaign and jubilee medals

== See also ==
- List of female Heroes of the Soviet Union
- Yekaterina Mikhailova-Demina
- Vera Kashcheyeva
