= Poltavske, Crimea =

Village in Crimea, Ukraine

Poltavske Полтавське
- Village
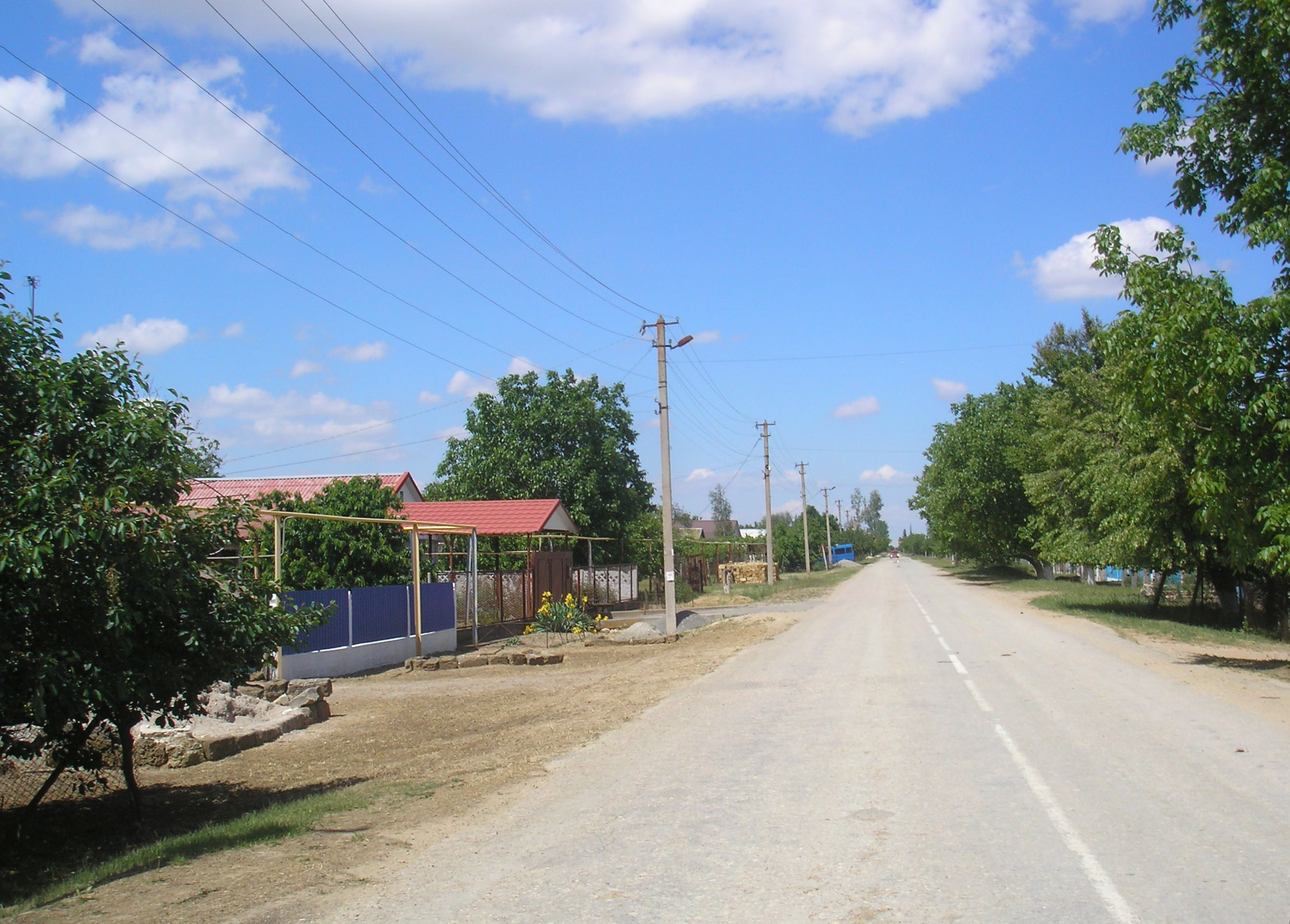

- Location within Crimea Location within Ukraine
- Coordinates: 45°47′20″N 33°54′28″E
- Country: Ukraine (occupied by Russia)
- Republic: Autonomous Republic of Crimea
- Raion: Krasnoperekopsk Raion

Government
  - Mayor: Iryna Maskymivna Melnychuk

Area
  - Total: 0.65 km^{2} (0.25 sq mi)
- Elevation: 13 m (43 ft)

Population (2001)
  - Total: 523
  - Density: 800/km^{2} (2,100/sq mi)
- Time zone: UTC+2 (EET)
  - Summer (DST): UTC+3 (EEST)
- Postal code: 96050
- Area code: +380 6565
- Vehicle registration: AK/KK/01

Poltavske (Ukrainian: Полтавське; Russian: Полтавскoе; Crimean Tatar: Can Saqal Manğıt), is a village in the southern part of the Krasnoperekopsk Raion, Autonomous Republic of Crimea, southern Ukraine. The settlement was occupied in 2014, and was unilaterally annexed by the Russian Federation, after conducting a highly disputed referendum.

== Geography ==
Poltavske is located in the northern part of the Crimean peninsula. The district border between the Krasnoperekopsk Raion and the Pervomaiske Raion is located on the southern edge of the settlement. The Vorontsivka river splits the village into two parts.

== History ==
The village was mentioned for the first time in a document from 1784, and was most likely established while the region was still under the rule of the Crimean Khanate. Following Crimea's annexation by the Russian Empire, the region was incorporated as part of the Taurida Governorate. In 1805, the village consisted of 29 yards, with 120 Crimean Tatars and 54 Gypsies dwelling in the settlement. As the result of the Crimean War, the village was abandoned between 1860 and 1864, with many Crimean Tatars emigrating to Turkey. As the result of the Tatar exodus, ethnic Germans and Ukrainians started to populate the area. The 1926 Soviet census concluded that the village had 43 residents, of whom 13 were Ukrainians, while another 13 were Germans, with the latter group being ethnically cleansed from region in the early 1940s. In the late 1940s, a collective farm was established in the settlement. As the result of that, ethnic Russian migrants from poor regions of the modern-day Russian Federation started to arrive in the village, as well as a new wave of Ukrainians.

== Demographics ==
As of the Ukrainian national census in 2001, the settlement had a population of 523 inhabitants. The native language composition was as follows:

First languages in Poltavske
	percent
Ukrainian	40.9%
Russian	33.3%
Crimean Tatar	25.2%
Bulgarian	0.2%
Belarusian	0.2%
others	0.2%

=== Historical population data ===
Ethnic makeup according to the first Soviet census:

1926 Soviet census (by ethnicity)
	percent
Germans	30.23%
Ukrainians	30.23%
others	39.54%
