= Svatove, Crimea =

Settlement in Crimea, Ukraine

Svatove Сватове
- Urban-type settlement
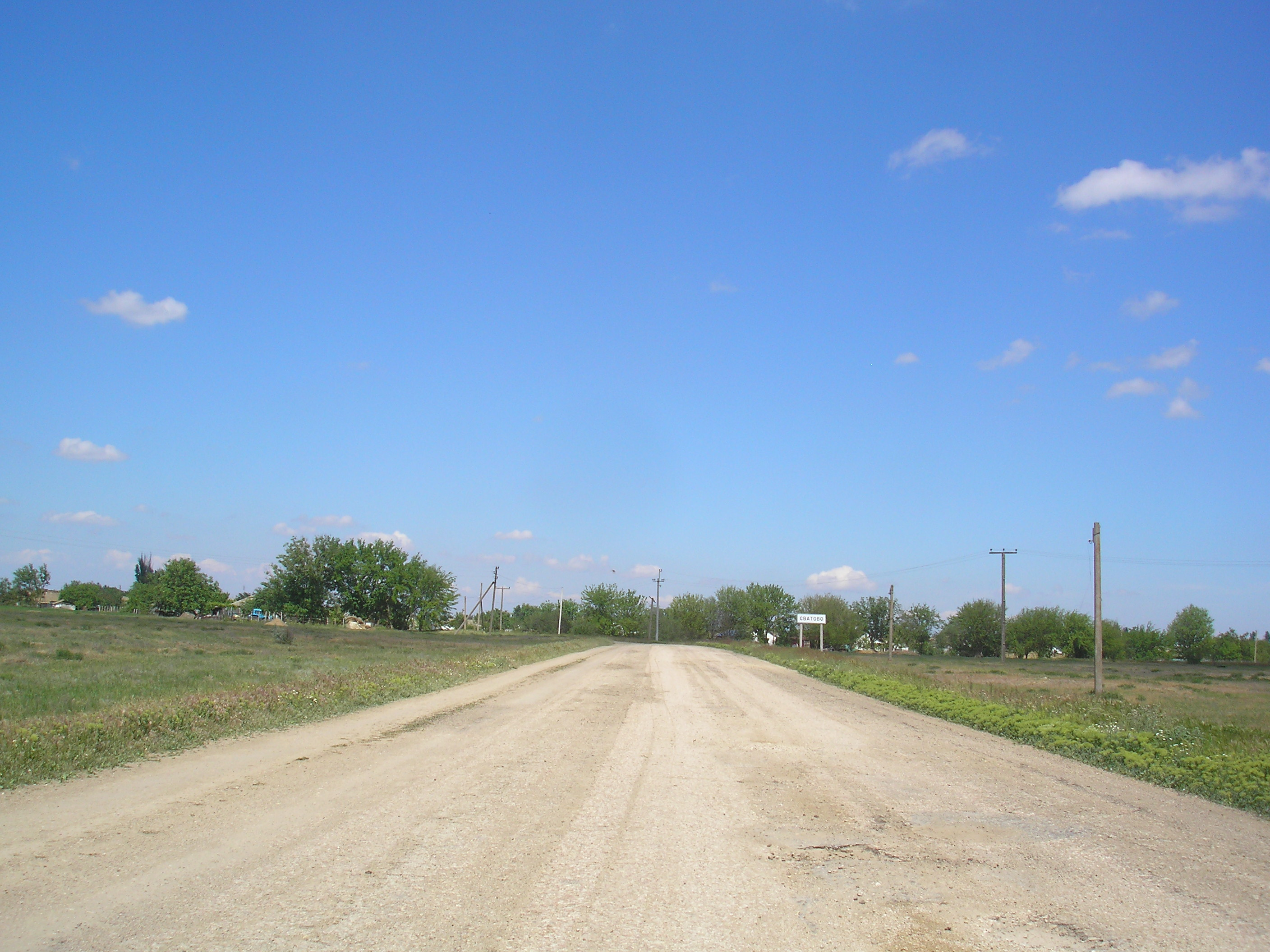

- Location within Crimea Location within Ukraine
- Coordinates: 45°48′48″N 33°52′2″E
- Country: Ukraine
- Republic: Autonomous Republic of Crimea
- Raion: Krasnoperekopsk Raion
- Hromada: Bratske rural hromada

Government
  - Mayor (2010): Iryna Melnychuk

Population (2001)
  - Total: 230
- Time zone: UTC+2 (EET)
  - Summer (DST): UTC+3 (EEST)
- Postal code: 96050
- Area code: +380 6565
- Vehicle registration: AK/KK/01
- Control: Russia

Svatove (Ukrainian: Сватове; Russian: Сватово; Crimean Tatar: Sultanaş), is a village in the Krasnoperekopsk district, Autonomous Republic of Crimea, southern Ukraine, which along the rest of the Crimean peninsula, is currently occupied and administered by the Russian Federation.

== History ==
The village was established by Crimean Tatars under the name of Sultanash. Following the Crimean War, the village was abandoned due to the Tatar exodus, but was quickly reestablished by ethnic Ukrainian settlers, who moved into the abandoned settlements. In 1948, after Soviet authorities deported the remainder of the Crimean Tatar population to Central Asia, the village was renamed to Svatovo as part of a large de-Tatarization campaign on the peninsula. In 2014, along with the rest of Crimea, the settlement came under Russian occupation and was unilaterally annexed by the Russian Federation, after Russian-installed authorities conducted a referendum, which was widely considered to be a sham vote with predetermined results.

== Demographics ==
As of the 2001 Ukrainian census, the village had a population of 230 inhabitants. In terms of ethnic groups living in the settlement, it is estimated that Ukrainians make up a solid majority, followed by large Crimean Tatar and Russian minorities. When it comes to spoken languages in the settlement, a relative majority of the population is Ukrainian speaking, while large minorities speak Russian and Crimean Tatar. The exact native language composition was as follows:

Native languages in Svatove
	percent
Ukrainian	39.1%
Russian	36.5%
Crimean Tatar	24.3%
others	0.1%

=== Historical population data ===
As of the 1926 Soviet census, authorities registered 21 yards and a population of 107 inhabitants. The ethnic composition was as follows:

1926 Soviet census
Ethnicity	Inhabitants	Percentage
Ukrainians	105	98.13%
others	2	1.87%
Total:	107	100%
