= Voloshyne, Zhytomyr Oblast =

Village in Zhytomyr Oblast, Ukraine

Voloshyne Волошине
- Village
- Location within Zhytomyr Oblast Location within Ukraine
- Coordinates: 51°09′37″N 28°13′51″E
- Country: Ukraine
- Oblast: Zhytomyr Oblast
- Raion: Korosten Raion
- Elevation: 192 m (630 ft)

Population (2001)
  - Total: 173
- Time zone: UTC+2 (EET)
  - Summer (DST): UTC+3 (EEST)

Voloshyne (Ukrainian: Волошине) is a village in Korosten Raion of Zhytomyr Oblast in Ukraine.

Voloshyne was previously located in Luhyny Raion until it was abolished on 18 July 2020 as part of the administrative reform of Ukraine, which reduced the number of raions of Zhytomyr Oblast to four. The area of Luhyny Raion was merged into Korosten Raion.
