= Crimean Titan =

Chemical manufacturer in Armyansk, Crimea

Crimea TITAN
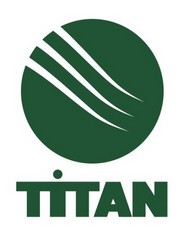
- Native name: Крымский ТИТАН
- Romanized name: Crimea TITAN
- Formerly: КГПО «ТИТАН» Закрытое акционерное общество «Крымский ТИТАН»
- Company type: Privately held
- Industry: Chemical Industry
- Founded: 1969
- Headquarters: Armyansk
- Products: Titanium dioxide
- Number of employees: > 4500

Crimea TITAN (Russian: Крымский Титан; Ukrainian: Кримський Титан; Crimean Tatar: Къырым титан) is the largest manufacturer of titanium dioxide pigment in Eastern Europe. It is located in Armyansk, Crimea.

== Location and geography ==
The plant is located in Crimea, in the northern part of the Perekop Isthmus near the coast of the Sivash. It covers an area of 4,785 hectares (11,820 acres). It is connected by railroad to Vadim station on the Odesa railway.

== History ==
The decision to build the Crimean State Production Association "TITAN" (KPO "TITAN") [Russian: Крымского Государственного Производственного Объединения «ТИТАН» (КГПО «ТИТАН»)] was made in December 1969. In 1971 a factory producing Ammonium Phosphate was commissioned. In 1973, aluminium sulfate, and water glass facilities were finished. In 1974, a red iron oxide pigment facility was opened. In 1978, two titanium dioxide pigment plants were commissioned.

In March 1999 the KPO "TITAN" became part of the 'Syvash economic zone' [Russian:Sэкономической зоны «Сиваш»] - this free economic zone was an initiative of the Government of Ukraine as an experiment. In February 2000, the KPO "TITAN" was converted into the state joint stock company SJSC "TITAN" [Russian: Государственной акционерной компании «Титан» (ГАК «ТИТАН»)].

In August 2004, the closed joint stock company "Crimean TITAN" [Russian: Закрытое акционерное общество «Крымский ТИТАН»] was formed, comprising 50% less one share held by Ostchem Germany GmbH (controlled by Dmitry Firtash). The remaining majority was held by SJSC "TITAN".

In December 2012, Group DF acquired 100% of Crimea TITAN's shares.

=== Crimea annexation ===
After the Annexation of Crimea by the Russian Federation in 2014, a company was registered in Moscow as the private limited company "Titanium Investments" [Russian: ООО "Титановые инвестиции"]. The name of the plant was changed to "Ukrainian Chemical Products" [Russian: Юкрейниан Кемикал Продактс]. The location of registration of the company changed from Armyansk to Kyiv. The Moscow-based company was leasing the "Ukrainian Chemical Products" plant, as well as supplying and exporting products.

The plant was reliant on the production of two Ukrainian mining and enriching plants at Vilnohirsk and Irshansk. Previously these were leased by the plant. In 2014 they were transferred by the Ukrainian government to the Ministry of the Economy, and transferred to the state-owned "United Mining and Chemical Company" [Russian: Объединенная горно-химическая компания (ОГХК)]. The company remained registered as a Ukrainian enterprise, paying tax on profits in Ukraine. Local taxes were paid in Crimea. The company attempted to continue to receive supplies from Ukraine, avoiding sanctions.

Post-2014, the plant suffered with revenue falling by nearly three quarters, from ~$300 million in 2013 to ~$86 million in 2015. Import substitution of Ilmentite from Sri Lanka began in 2016. Other issues relating to the Ukraine-Russia-Crimea situation included a lack of water for industrial production, due to restrictions on water from Ukraine to supply the North Crimean Canal. Wages were reported as being paid at much-reduced levels. In late 2017, it was reported that the business was still suffering shortages of Ilmenite and operating at ~40-50% capacity, and had been receiving ore from Norway, Sri Lanka, and Brazil.

In 2017, Russian state bank VTB began bankruptcy proceedings against Titanium Investments, claiming $40 million in unpaid debts. In reaction Dmitry Firtash sought to transfer the business to a new company "TitanActive" [Russian: ТитанАктив], to avoid effects on the business due to the litigation.

Places close to the titanium plant, namely Armyansk and Perekop, were first reportedly on 23 August 2018 hit by a noxious sulphur dioxide gas allegedly coming from the water reservoir of the plant. 4,000 children were evacuated from Armyansk. Ukrainian authorities claimed that by 10 September 2018, dozens of people had sought medical assistance in mainland Ukraine.

Crimean ecologist Margarita Litvinenko claimed that gas was caused, because the water reservoir of the plant did not contain enough water, due to the water shortage in Crimea caused by Ukraine's decision to stop the flow from the North Crimean Canal after the Russian annexation of Crimea.

In 2023, as the Russian invasion of Ukraine was taking place, Ukrainian intelligence claimed that Russia was mining the workshops of the Crimean Titan factory. Retired Ukrainian colonel Roman Svitan stated that, should Russia blow up the Crimean Titan factory, a hypothetical Ukrainian attack into Russian-controlled Crimea would be temporarily hindered, unless Ukrainian troops were equipped with chemical protection suits. Svitan said this during an interview shortly after the destruction of the Kakhovka Dam, which Ukrainian officials have attributed to Russia.

== Production ==
The plant has two main units («Титан-1» and «Титан-2»), each with a design production capacity of 40,000 tons pa.

The production of Titanium dioxide at the plant uses Ilmenite as a feedstock, using concentrated Sulfuric acid to dissolve the ground ore. Iron-based impurities are reduced to Iron (II) in solution. The liquid mixture is then filtered. Iron (II) is removed by selective crystallization and centrifugal separation upon cooling of the solution. Next, the Titanyl sulfate solution is evaporatively concentrated.

The Titanyl sulfate solution is hydrolyzed producing amorphous flakes of Titanium dioxide, which are then filtered and washed. Filtered Titanium dioxide is then calcined to drive off water. Further surface treatment and grinding may be applied to the Titanium dioxide for specific uses or properties of the Titanium dioxide pigment.

In addition to its primary product (~90% of exports), the plant generates red iron oxide pigment, mineral fertilizers, sulfuric acid, aluminum sulfate, water glass, iron sulfate, copper sulfate, and alkaline sodium and lithium chemicals.

Titanium dioxide is popular in the CIS countries and abroad. Supplies go to countries such as India, Latin America, Serbia, Turkey, Belarus, Azerbaijan and Uzbekistan.

== See also ==
- Types of business entity in Russia
- 2018 chemical incident of Armyansk
