= Voloshyne, Crimea =

Voloshyne
- Village
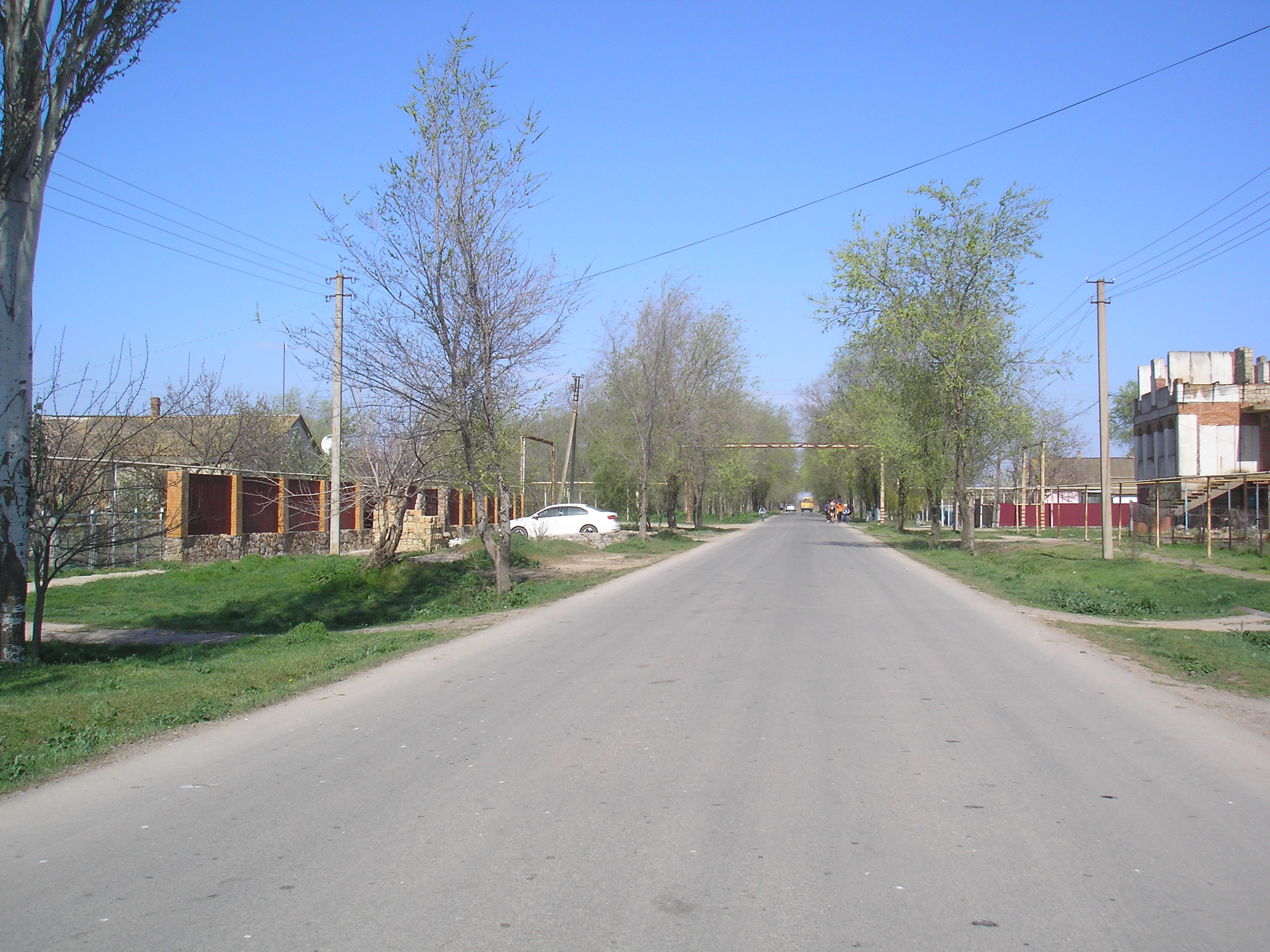

- Location within Crimea
- Coordinates: 46°06′46″N 33°38′47″E
- Country: Disputed: Ukraine (de jure); Russia (de facto)
- Region: (Autonomous Republic of Crimea) Crimea^{1}
- Municipality: Armiansk

Population
  - Total: 152
- Time zone: UTC+4 (MSK)
- ^{1} Autonomous Republic of Crimea (de jure) or Republic of Crimea (de facto), depending on jurisdiction.

Voloshyne (Russian: Волошино; Ukrainian: Волошине; Crimean Tatar: Qula) is a village located in Armiansk Municipality, Crimea, on the Isthmus of Perekop. The population was 152 as of the 2014 Crimean census.

== See also ==
- Armiansk Municipality
