= Suvorove, Bakhchysarai Raion, Crimea =

Suvorove
- Village
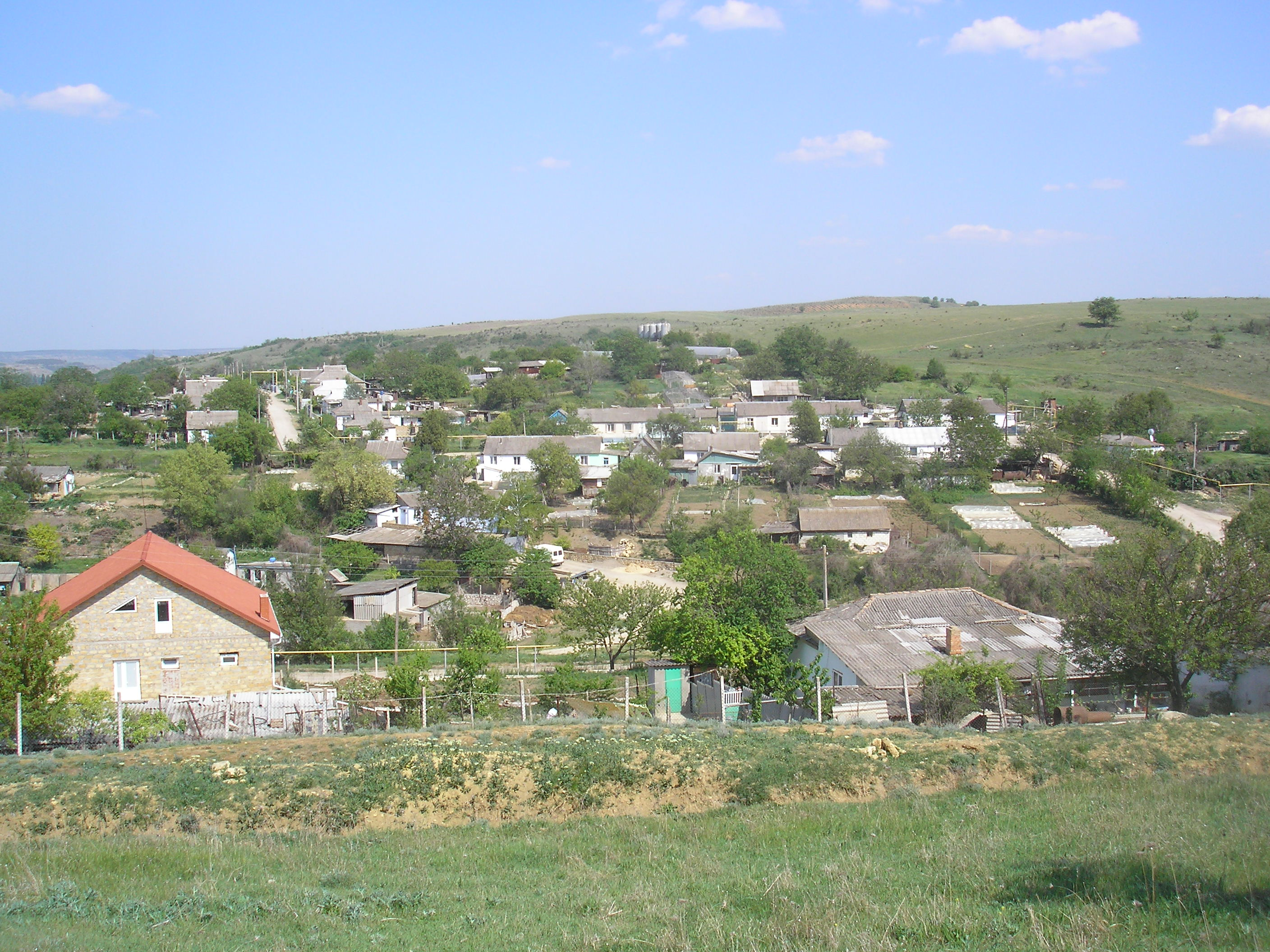

- Location within Ukraine Location within Crimea
- Coordinates: 44°44′05″N 33°37′45″E
- Country: Ukraine
- Region: Autonomous Republic of Crimea
- Municipality: Bakhchysarai

Population
  - Total: 554
- Time zone: UTC+4 (MSK)

Suvorove (Russian: Суворово; Ukrainian: Суворове; Crimean Tatar: Arançı) is a village located in Bakhchysarai Raion, Autonomous Republic of Crimea, Ukraine. Population: 554 (2014 Census).

== See also ==
- Bakhchysarai Raion
