= Suvorove, Armiansk Municipality, Crimea =

Suvorove
- Village
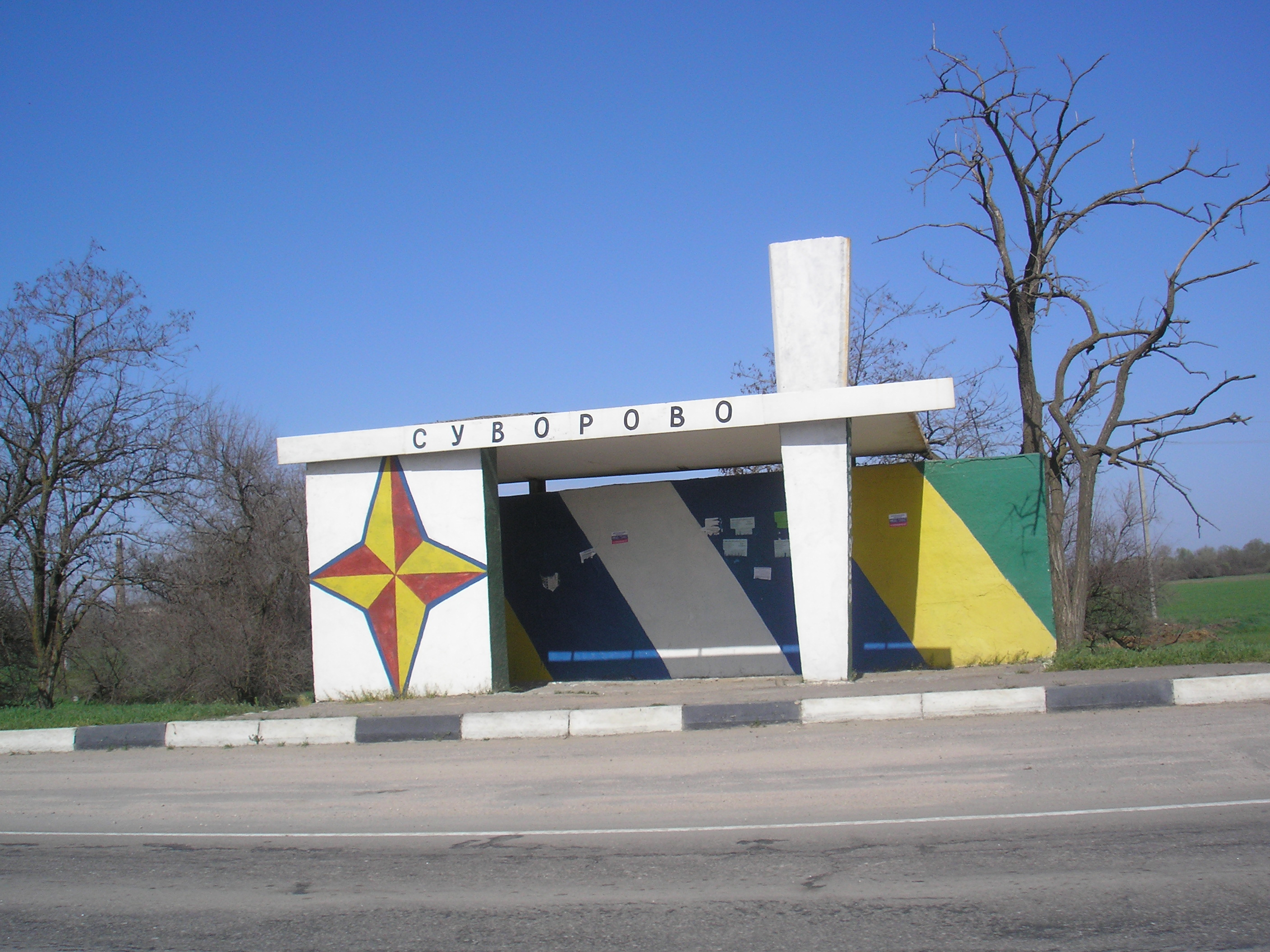

- Location within Crimea
- Coordinates: 46°05′14″N 33°41′28″E
- Country: Ukraine
- Region: (Autonomous Republic of Crimea) Crimea^{1}
- Municipality: Armiansk

Population
  - Total: 1,357
- Time zone: UTC+4 (MSK)
- ^{1} Autonomous Republic of Crimea (de jure) or Republic of Crimea (de facto), depending on jurisdiction.

Suvorove (Russian: Суворово; Ukrainian: Суворове; Crimean Tatar: Üç Cılğa) is a village located in Armiansk Municipality, Crimea. Population: 1,357 (2014 Census).

== See also ==
- Armiansk Municipality
