= Armiansk =

Urban settlement in Ukraine

Armiansk Армянськ (Ukrainian) Армянск (Russian) Ermeni Bazar (Crimean Tatar) Արմյանսկ (Armenian)
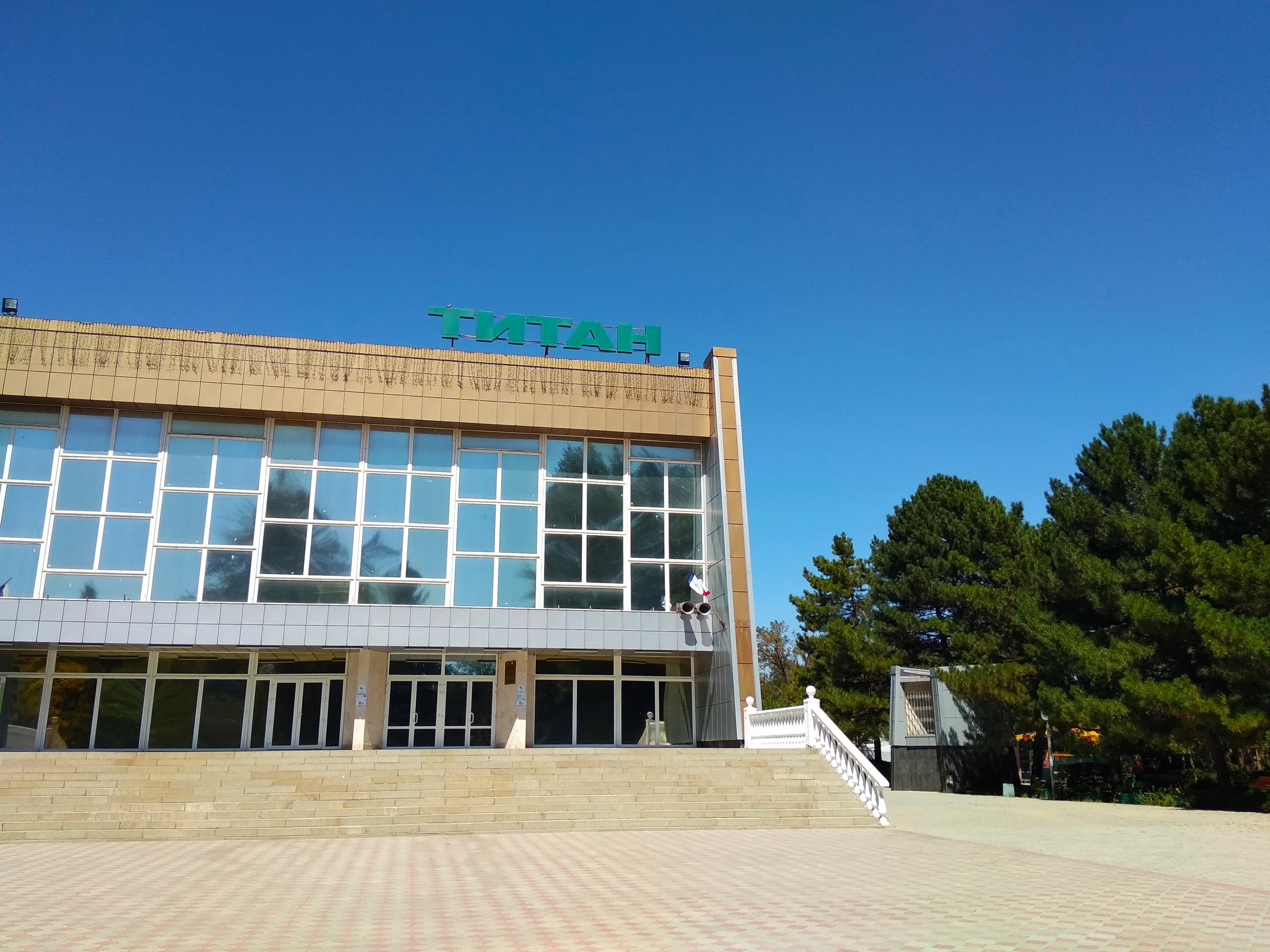
- Culture center in Armiansk

- Flag Coat of arms
- Interactive map of Armiansk
- Location of Armiansk within the Crimea Armiansk (Crimea)
- Coordinates: 46°6′53″N 33°41′26″E
- Country: Disputed: Ukraine (de jure); Russia (de facto)
- Autonomous republic: Crimea (de jure)
- Raion: Perekop Raion (de jure)
- Federal subject: Crimea (de facto)
- Municipality: Armiansk Municipality (de facto)

Area
  - Total: 16.2 km^{2} (6.3 sq mi)
- Elevation: 5 m (16 ft)

Population (2014)
  - Total: 21,987
  - Density: 1,375.68/km^{2} (3,563.0/sq mi)
- Time zone: UTC+3 (MSK)
- Postal code: 96012–96016
- Area code: +7-36567
- Former name: Armianskyi Bazar
- Climate: Cfa
- Website: http://armgov.ru/

Armiansk (Ukrainian: Армянськ [ɐrˈmʲɑnʲsʲk]; Russian: Армянск; Armenian: Արմյանսկ; Crimean Tatar: Ermeni Bazar) is a city of regional significance in the northern Crimean peninsula. The status of Crimea has been disputed by Ukraine and Russia since February 2014. Armiansk is located on the Isthmus of Perekop and serves as the administrative center of the Armiansk Municipality. Population: 21,987 (2014 Census).

== History ==
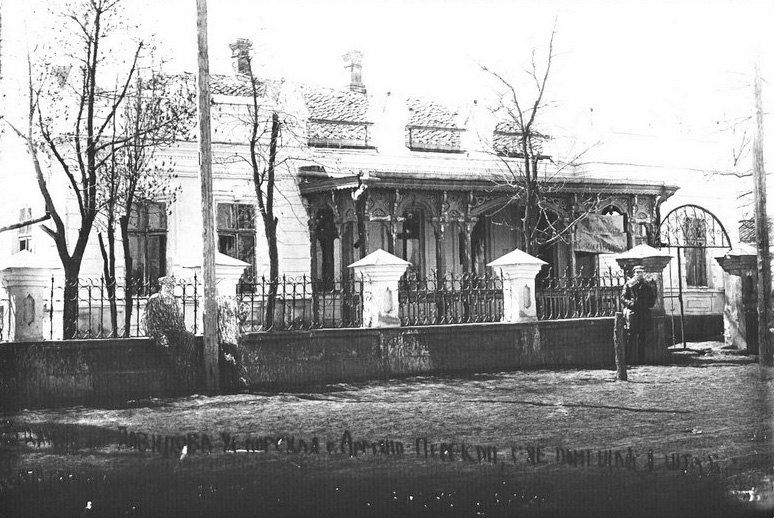
Ermeni Bazar in 1918

At the beginning of the 18th century Armenians and Greeks who had come from the nearby city of Or Qapı (present-day Perekop) founded Armiansk. The first name of the town was Ermeni Bazar (Crimean Tatar for the "Armenian market"). In 1921 it was renamed Armiansk.

During World War II, the German occupiers operated a subcamp of the Dulag 123 prisoner-of-war camp in the town.

On 2 March 2014, early in the 2014 Crimean Crisis, Russian Naval Infantry units without cockades or rank insignia set up a checkpoint in Armiansk to check cars driving in and out of the Crimea region.

On 11 June 2026, there was a major attack on a Russian vehicle convoy travelling through Armiansk during the Russian war on Ukraine. Approximately 50 vehicles were in the convoy, many carrying fuel and ammunition for the Russian forces, that were routed through the city following Ukrainian military strikes of the traditional resupply route over the Chonhar Bridge shut down the main route to the Crimean Peninsula from the north.

== Demographics ==
Historical population

Year	Pop.	±% p.a.
1860	5,450	—
1923	2,306	−1.36%
1926	2,666	+4.95%
1939	3,963	+3.10%
1970	8,532	+2.50%
1979	20,650	+10.32%
1989	24,833	+1.86%
1992	26,000	+1.54%
1998	25,000	−0.65%
2001	23,869	−1.53%
2003	23,541	−0.69%
2004	23,108	−1.84%
2005	22,879	−0.99%
2006	22,893	+0.06%

Year	Pop.	±% p.a.
2007	22,922	+0.13%
2008	22,884	−0.17%
2009	22,800	−0.37%
2010	22,711	−0.39%
2011	22,592	−0.52%
2012	22,468	−0.55%
2013	22,337	−0.58%
2014	22,286	−0.23%
2020	21,406	−0.67%
2021	20,692	−3.34%
2022	21,291	+2.89%
2023	20,357	−4.39%
2024	19,917	−2.16%

Ethnic makeup according to the 2001 Ukrainian census:

Ethnic groups in Armiansk
	percent
Russians	55.72%
Ukrainians	36.19%
Crimean Tatars	3.53%
Belarusians	1.11%
Armenians	0.35%
Tatars	0.32%
Moldovans	0.32%
Azerbaijanis	0.31%

== Economy ==
- Crimean Titan, Ti metallurgy, TiO_{2}, TiCl_{2} TiCl_{4} and many other chemicals

The main employer in the city and the area is Crimean Titan (Russian: Крымский Титан; Ukrainian: Кримський Титан), which specializes in the refining of Titanium dioxide for use in paints, plastics, and other products.

== Education ==
- Institute of Pedagogical Education and Management (Branch), Crimean Federal University

== Transport ==
In ancient times, the city was located on the Muravsky Trail, an important road to Crimea. Now this road connects Kherson Oblast to Autonomous Republic of Crimea. The town also has a railroad station.

== Notable people ==
- Kostyantyn Vizyonok (born 1976), Ukrainian football player
