= Isthmus of Perekop =

Isthmus

Coordinates: 46°08′58″N 33°40′20″E

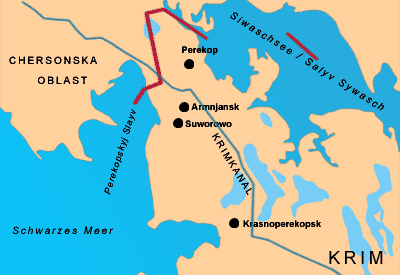
The Isthmus of Perekop, with Crimea to the bottom

The Isthmus of Perekop, literally the Isthmus of the Trench, (Note: Ukrainian: Перекопський перешийок, romanized: Perekopśkyj perešyjok; Russian: Перекопский перешеек, romanized: Perekopskij perešejek; Crimean Tatar: Ор бойну, romanized: Or boynu; Turkish: Оркапы, romanized: Orkapı; Greek: Τάφρος, romanized: Táphros, cyrillized: Тафрос) is the narrow, 5–7 kilometres (3.1–4.3 mi) wide strip of land that connects the Crimean Peninsula to the mainland of Ukraine. The isthmus projects between the Black Sea to the west and the Syvash to the east. The isthmus takes its name of "Perekop" from the Tatar fortress of Or Qapi.

The border between Ukraine's Autonomous Republic of Crimea and Kherson Oblast runs through the northern part of the isthmus. Since the start of the Russian military occupation and subsequent annexation of Crimea in 2014, this is also the de facto northern border of the Russian Republic of Crimea. The settlements of Perekop, Armiansk, Suvorove, Voloshyne, and Krasnoperekopsk are situated on the isthmus. The North Crimean Canal ran through the isthmus, supplying Crimea with fresh water from the Dnieper River. Ukraine closed the canal in 2014, and the water supply was only partially replaced by other local and Russian sources.

Rich salt ores are located in the south of the isthmus and are of commercial importance to the region.

== Toponym ==
The name Taphros in Greek means a dug-out trench, per a defensive trench dug between the Azov Sea and the Black Sea; there also appears to have been a town in the vicinity of the same name. The Crimean Tatar name of Or Qapı adopts the Greek in the Crimean Tatar language meaning Or "trench" and Qapı "gate," and Perekop in the Slavic languages literally means a dug-out.

== History ==
The strategic and commercial value of this area, together with the strategic value of being the gateway to Crimea, has made the isthmus the location of some particularly fierce battles. From antiquity through the Byzantine era the Greeks fortified the area, and so subsequently did the Crimean Tatars. In the 15th century the area became a colony of the maritime Republic of Genoa. In 1783 the area became a part of the Russian Empire, which made Perekop a county center of Tavriia gubernia. In 1954, together with Crimea it was transferred to the Ukrainian Soviet Republic.

In November 1920, during the Russian Civil War, a battle was fought here between Red Army and the White troops of Pyotr Wrangel, who was in control of the Crimea. The Red Army turned out victorious, but 140,000 civilians fled over the Black Sea to Istanbul.

During World War II, the combined forces of German and Romanian troops under the command of Erich von Manstein entered Crimea through the Isthmus of Perekop. The battle of the isthmus lasted five days from 24 September 1941 before the isthmus was secured by the Axis forces. On 27 October the Axis forces advanced further into Crimea, leading to the Battle of Sevastopol, which ended with the capture of all of Crimea in July 1942. On 9 May 1944, the Red Army regained control of Crimea.

On 2 March 2014, it was reported that Russian troops were digging trenches along the border between Crimea and mainland Ukraine, which runs across the isthmus. Soon after, this became a de facto border between Russian-controlled Crimea and the rest of Ukraine until 24 February 2022, when Russian forces crossed over the frontier during their invasion of Ukraine and unilaterally annexed the adjacent areas of the Ukrainian mainland.

== See also ==
- Chonhar Peninsula
