= Krasnoperekopsk Raion =

Coordinates: 45°58′03″N 33°48′01″E

Krasnoperekopsk Raion: Красноперекопський район (Ukrainian); Красноперекопский район (Russian); Krasnoperekopsky District; Krasnoperekopsk rayonı (Crimean Tatar)
- Raion
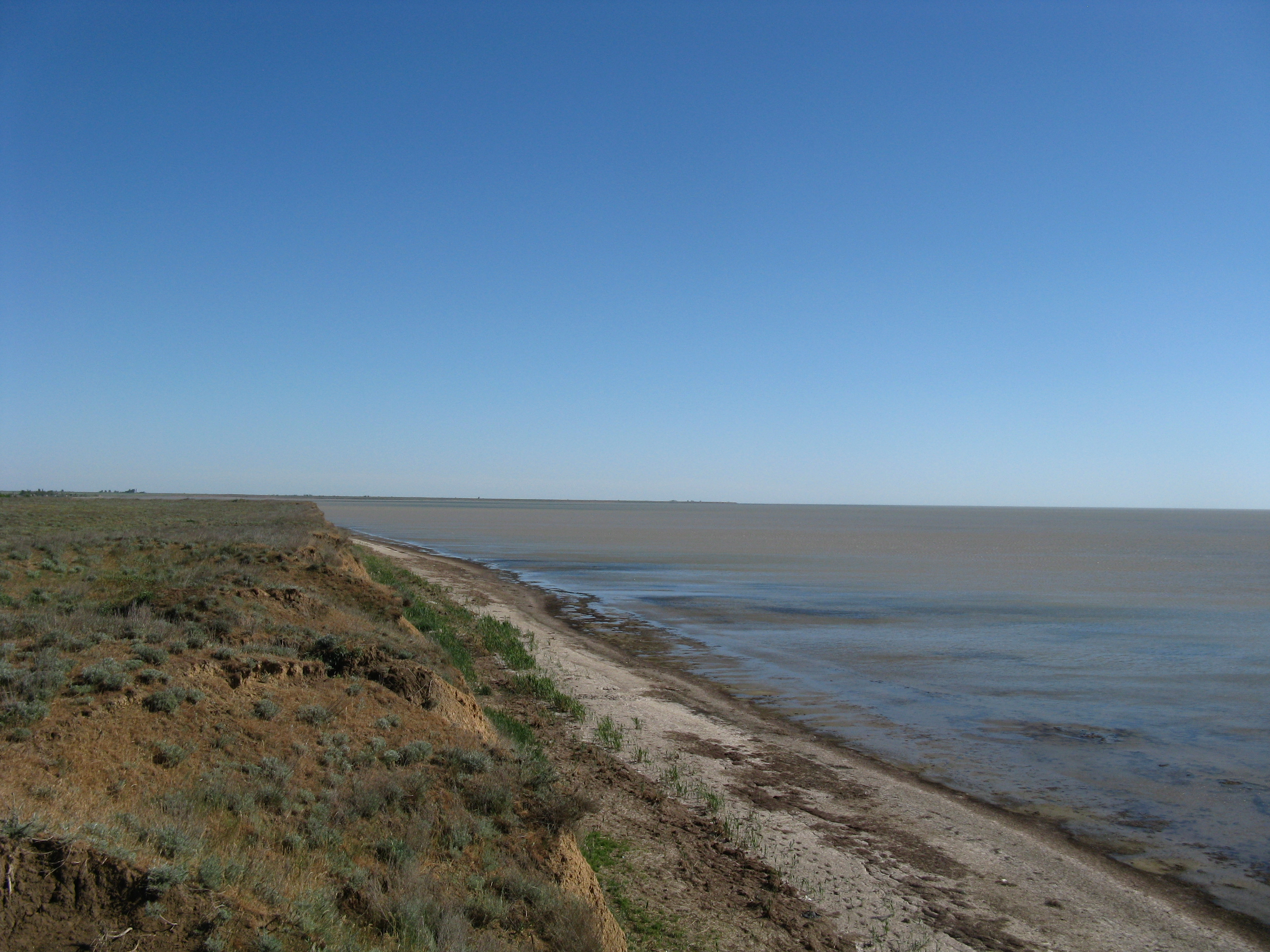
- Karkinit Bay, Krasnoperekopsky District

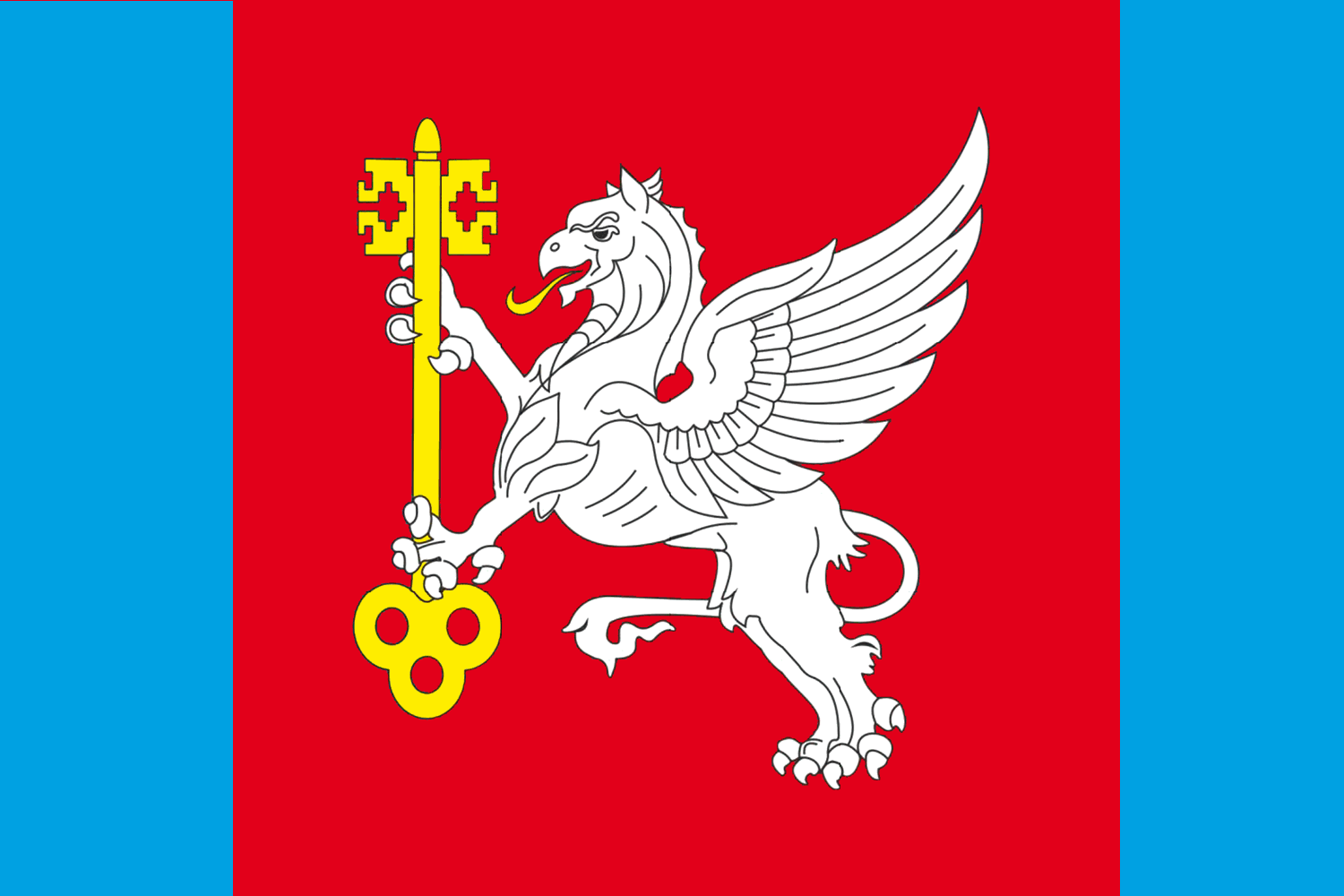
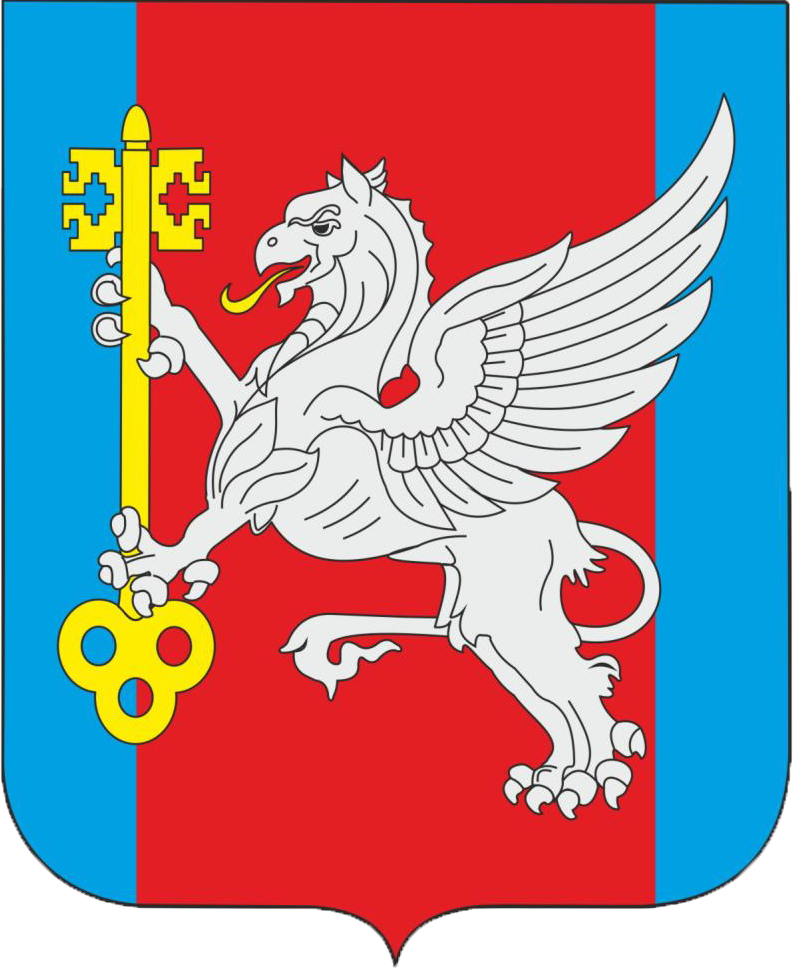
- Flag Seal
- Raion location within Crimea
- Country: Ukraine
- Republic: Crimea
- Capital: Krasnoperekopsk
- Subdivisions: List: 0 cities; 0 towns; 38 villages

Area
  - Total: 1,231 km^{2} (475 sq mi)

Population (2014)
  - Total: 24,738
  - Density: 20.10/km^{2} (52.05/sq mi)
- Time zone: UTC+3 (MSK)
- Dialing code: +380-6565

Krasnoperekopsk Raion (Ukrainian: Красноперекопський район; Crimean Tatar: Krasnoperekopsk rayonı) or Krasnoperekopsky District (Russian: Красноперекопский район) is one of the 25 districts of the Autonomous Republic of Crimea, a territory recognized by a majority of countries as part of Ukraine, but currently occupied and incorporated by Russia as the Republic of Crimea. It is situated in the northern part of the republic. The administrative center of the raion is the town of Krasnoperekopsk. The latter is not a part of the raion (district) and incorporated separately as a town of regional significance. Population (without Krasnoperekopsk): 24,738 (2014 Census).

On 12 May 2016, Ukrainian authorities (Note: Since the annexation of Crimea by the Russian Federation, the status of the Crimea and of the city of Sevastopol is under dispute between Russia and Ukraine; Ukraine and the majority of the international community considers the Crimea and Sevastopol an integral part of Ukraine, while Russia, on the other hand, considers the Crimea and Sevastopol an integral part of Russia, with Sevastopol functioning as a federal city within the Crimean Federal District.) renamed the district to Perekop Raion (Ukrainian: Перекопський район) as part of its decommunization efforts. The renaming is intended to take practical effect upon the Ukrainian recapture of Crimea.

== Demographics ==
The Raion had a population of 31.843 according to the 2001 Ukrainian census. The largest ethnic group are Ukrainians, accounting for almost half of the population, followed by Russians, Crimean Tatars and Belarusians. Rural areas are vastly Ukrainophone, while population centers are mostly Russian-speaking. Crimean Tatar is spoken by a significant minority in almost every settlement.

Ethnic composition of Krasnoperekopsk Raion
	percent
Ukrainians	43.4%
Russians	33.2%
Crimean Tatars	17.2%
Belarusians	1.2%
others	0.7%

2001 Ukrainian Census
Native language	Inhabitants	Percentage
Russian	16,958	53,3%
Ukrainian	8,529	26.8%
Crimean Tatar	4,944	15.5%
Belarusian	113	0.4%
others	1.018	3.2%
Total:	31,843	100%

=== Settlements in the district ===
- As (formerly Proletarka)
- Bohachivka
- Bratske
- Dolinka
- Filativka
- Illinka
- Ishun
- Istochne
- Karpova Balka
- Krasnoarmiiske
- Kripke
- Kurhanne
- Mahazinka
- Nadeshdine
- Novoivanivka
- Novomykolaivka
- Novooleksandrivka
- Novopavlivka
- Novorybatske
- Orlivske
- Piatykhatka
- Pochetne
- Poltavske
- Pryvilne
- Rysove
- Shatry
- Smushkine
- Sovkhozne
- Svatove
- Tankove
- Tavriiske
- Tankove
- Vyshnivka
- Voyinka
- Voronzivka
- Zelena Nyva
- Znamianka

== 2020 Ukrainian Administrative Reform ==
In July 2020, Ukraine conducted an administrative reform throughout its de jure territory. This included Crimea, which was at the time occupied by Russia, and is still ongoing as of October 2023. Crimea was reorganized from 14 raions and 11 municipalities into 10 raions, with municipalities abolished altogether. The territory of Perekop Raion was expanded to also include the territories of Armiansk Municipality, Yani Qapu Municipality, and Rozdolne Raion, but has not yet been implemented due to the ongoing Russian occupation.
