= Krasnoperekopsk =

Krasnoperekopsk Яни Капу (Ukrainian) Красноперекопск (Russian) Yañı Qapu (Crimean Tatar)
- City
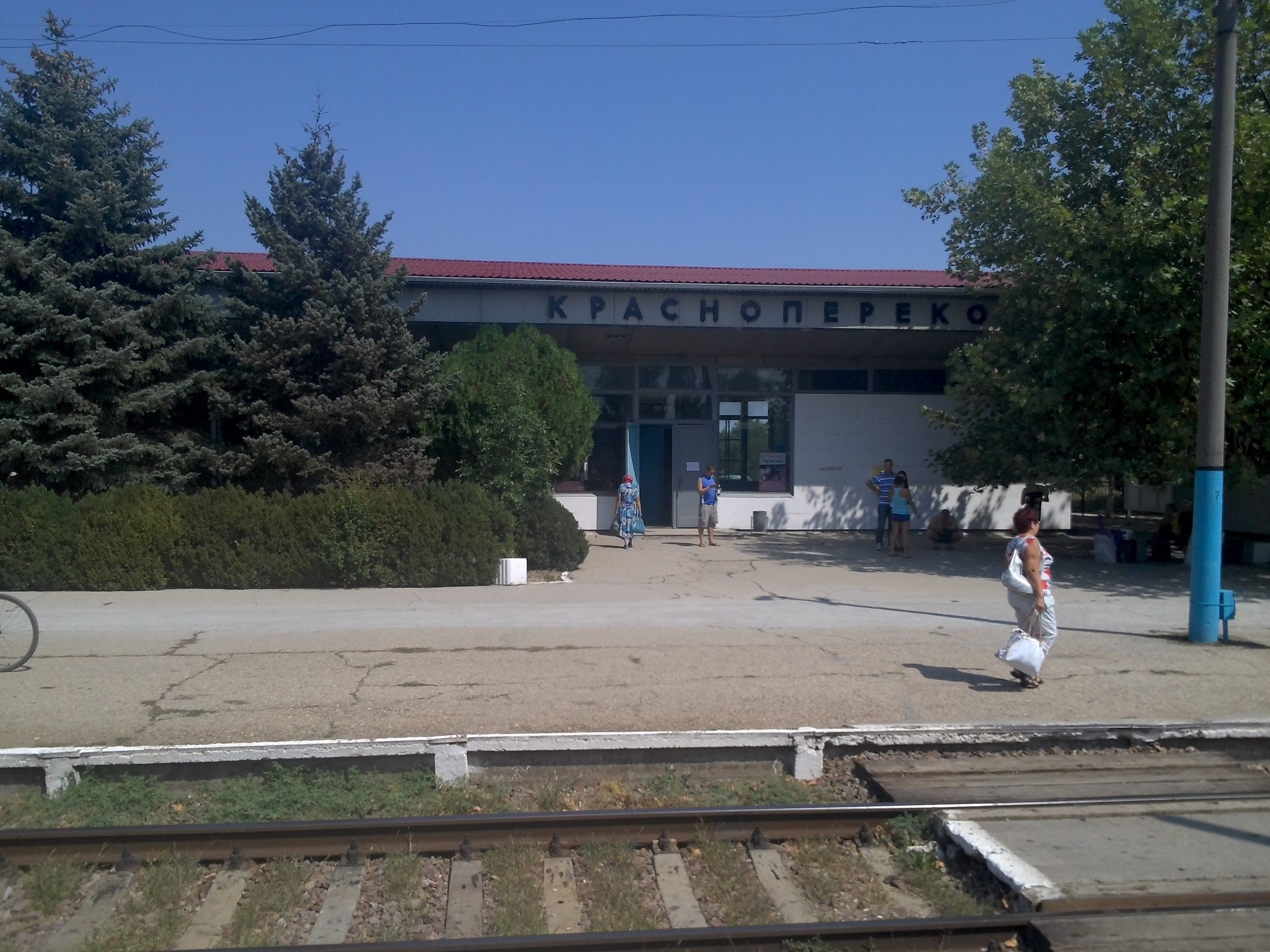
- Krasnoperekopsk railway station

- Flag Coat of arms
- Interactive map of Krasnoperekopsk
- Location of Krasnoperekopsk within Crimea Krasnoperekopsk (Ukraine) Krasnoperekopsk (Black Sea)
- Coordinates: 45°58′3″N 33°48′1″E
- Country: Ukraine (occupied by Russia)
- Autonomous republic: Crimea (de jure)
- Raion: Perekop Raion (de jure)
- Federal subject: Crimea (de facto)
- Municipality: Krasnoperekopsk Municipality (de facto)

Area
  - Total: 22 km^{2} (8.5 sq mi)
- Elevation: 5 m (16 ft)

Population (2025)
  - Total: 25,026
  - Density: 1,100/km^{2} (2,900/sq mi)
- Time zone: UTC+3 (MSK)
- Postal code: 96000–96005
- Area code: +7-36565

Krasnoperekopsk (Russian: Красноперекопск) or Yany Kapu (Ukrainian: Яни Капу; Crimean Tatar: Yañı Qapu) is a city in Crimea. Following the 2014 annexation of Crimea, it was incorporated into Russia's Republic of Crimea. However, a majority of countries recognise the territory as part of Ukraine within the Autonomous Republic of Crimea. It is the administrative center of Krasnoperekopsk Raion. Administratively it is not a part of the raion (district) and is incorporated separately as a town of regional significance. It has a population of 25,026 as of 2025.

It is located on the southern part of the Perekop Isthmus, on the shore of the Stare Lake, and about 124 kilometres (77 mi) from the Crimean capital, Simferopol. It lies on the Dzhankoi–Kherson railroad line (one of the two railroad lines connecting the Crimea and the rest of the continent).

== History ==
The city was founded as Bromzavod (Russian: Бромзавод) in 1932 as an industrial settlement for the bromine factory constructed near the Stare Lake (Crimean Tatar: Tuzla gölü, Тузла голю; Lake Tuzla, "Salty lake"). In 1936, the settlement became known as Krasno-Perekopsk (Красно-Перекопск) in honor of the Bolshevik-siding forces who stormed Perekop in 1920. In 1964, the name was changed to Krasnoperekopsk, and in 1966, it received the status of a city.

On 12 May 2016, Ukrainian authorities (Note: Since the annexation of Crimea by the Russian Federation, the status of the Crimea and of the city of Sevastopol is under dispute between Russia and Ukraine; Ukraine and the majority of the international community considers the Crimea and Sevastopol an integral part of Ukraine, while Russia, on the other hand, considers the Crimea and Sevastopol an integral part of Russia, with Sevastopol functioning as a federal city within the Crimean Federal District.) renamed the city Yany Kapu as part of its decommunization efforts. The renaming was originally intended to come into effect in the event that Ukraine regains Crimea, but the law was edited on 23 August 2023 to come into effect the next day.

== Geography ==
=== Climate ===
Krasnoperekopsk's climate is mostly dry and hot in the summer, and mild in the winter. The average temperature ranges from −2.4 °C (27.7 °F) in January, to 23.3 °C (73.9 °F) in July. The average precipitation is 336 mm (13.2 in) per year.

Climate data for Krasnoperekopsk, 1991–2021 temperature data, 1999-2019 sunshine data
Month	Jan	Feb	Mar	Apr	May	Jun	Jul	Aug	Sep	Oct	Nov	Dec	Year
Mean daily maximum °C (°F)	2.9 (37.2)	4.4 (39.9)	8.9 (48.0)	15.5 (59.9)	21.8 (71.2)	26.1 (79.0)	28.9 (84.0)	28.9 (84.0)	22.7 (72.9)	15.6 (60.1)	9.5 (49.1)	5.0 (41.0)	15.9 (60.5)
Daily mean °C (°F)	0.4 (32.7)	1.3 (34.3)	5.3 (41.5)	11.4 (52.5)	17.8 (64.0)	22.3 (72.1)	24.9 (76.8)	24.6 (76.3)	18.8 (65.8)	12.2 (54.0)	6.9 (44.4)	2.7 (36.9)	12.4 (54.3)
Mean daily minimum °C (°F)	−2.1 (28.2)	−1.5 (29.3)	2.0 (35.6)	7.4 (45.3)	13.5 (56.3)	18.2 (64.8)	20.7 (69.3)	20.3 (68.5)	15.2 (59.4)	9.1 (48.4)	4.4 (39.9)	0.4 (32.7)	9.0 (48.1)
Average precipitation mm (inches)	35 (1.4)	29 (1.1)	34 (1.3)	36 (1.4)	41 (1.6)	44 (1.7)	29 (1.1)	27 (1.1)	29 (1.1)	29 (1.1)	34 (1.3)	35 (1.4)	402 (15.6)
Average relative humidity (%)	82	80	76	70	66	63	60	59	66	74	82	81	72
Percentage possible sunshine	11.7	16.3	27.5	40.0	48.8	53.3	54.2	49.6	40.0	25.4	15.4	12.1	32.9

== Demographics ==
Historical population
Year	Pop.	±% p.a.
1939	1,873	—
1959	4,169	+4.08%
1970	14,664	+12.11%
1979	25,584	+6.38%
1989	31,143	+1.99%
2001	31,023	−0.03%
2014	26,268	−1.27%
2021	25,569	−0.38%
Source: Demoscope Weekly; State Statistics Service of Ukraine; Federal State Statistics Service

2001 Ukrainian Census
Nationality	Inhabitants	Percentage
Russians	16,561	52.9%
Ukrainians	13,602	43.5%
Crimean Tatars	1,121	3.6%
Total:	31,284	100%

== Economy ==
- Crimean Soda Plant, a major manufacturer of sodium carbonate
- Brom Joint Stock Company, manufactures bromine and bromine-based non-organic and organic compounds

== International relations ==
=== Twin towns and sister cities ===
Krasnoperekopsk is twinned with:

- Dzerzhinsky, Russia
- Busto Garolfo, Italy

== Notable people ==
- Serhiy Ferenchak (1984–2021), Ukrainian football player
