= Kachyk Lake =

- Location within Crimea
- Location: Crimea
- Coordinates: 45.0330°N 35.8992°E
- Type: salt lake

Kachyk Lake (Russian: Качик; Ukrainian: Качик; Crimean Tatar: Qaçıq) is a salt lake in the south of the Kerch Peninsula in the Lenine Raion district of Crimea. The lake belongs to the Kerch group of lakes.

Koyashskoye Salt Lake and Uzunlarske Lake are located to the east, and the coast of the Black Sea is to the south. The closest village is Vulkanivka to the west.
