= North Crimean Canal =

Irrigation project in Crimea

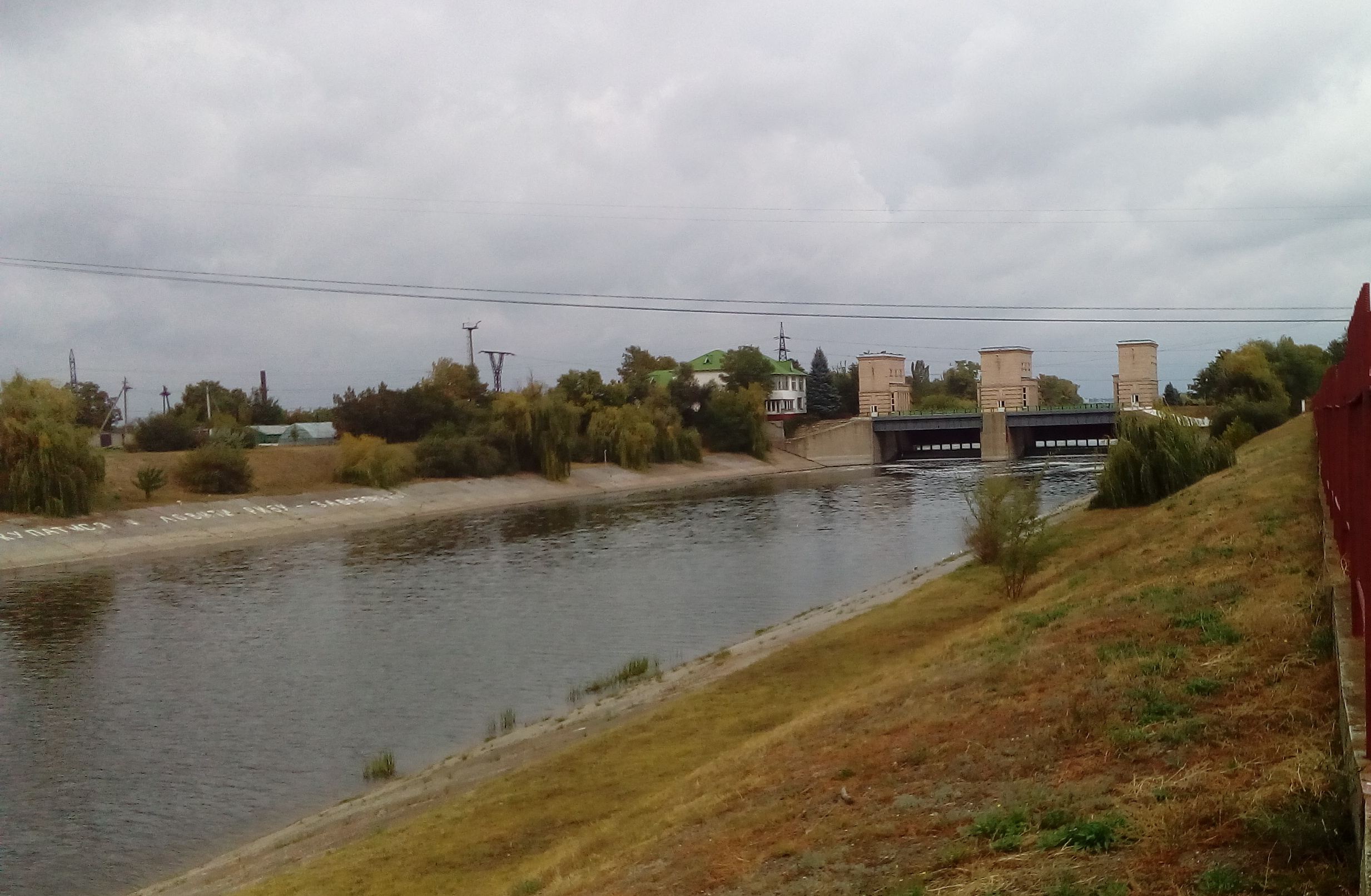
- Water intake structure at the start of the canal at Tavriisk, 800 m from the Kakhovka reservoir

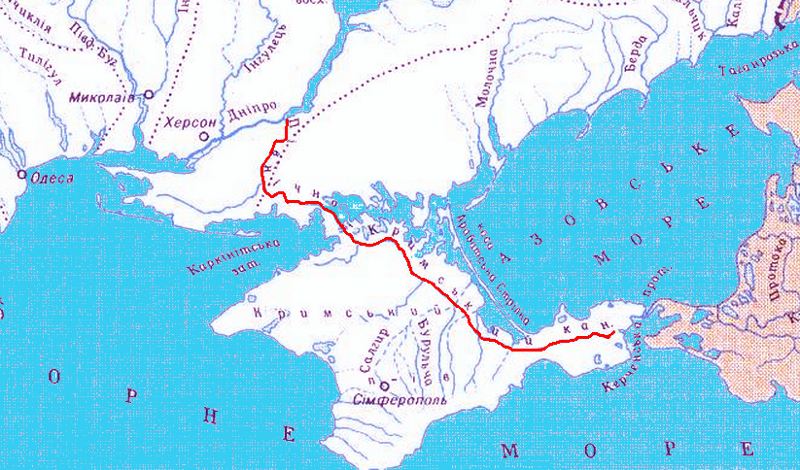
- Map of the canal
- Interactive map of North Crimean Canal

Specifications
- Length: 402.6 km (250.2 miles)

History
- Former names: North Crimean Canal of the Komsomol of Ukraine
- Current owner: Autonomous Republic of Crimea (de jure); Republic of Crimea (de facto); (see Political status of Crimea)
- Original owner: Soviet government
- Principal engineer: Ukrvodbud
- Other engineer: Ukrdiprovodbud
- Date of act: September 21, 1950
- Construction began: 1957
- Date completed: 1976

Geography
- Start point: Tavriisk, Ukraine
- End point: Kerch city water treatment facilities
- Beginning coordinates: 46°45′55″N 33°23′40″E
- Ending coordinates: 45°20′38″N 36°00′36″E
- Branches: Krasnoznamiansky Canal; Soyedenitelny Canal
- Connects to: Dnieper River

The North Crimean Canal, (Note: Ukrainian: Північнокримський канал, romanized: Pivnichnokrymskyi kanal; Russian: Северо-Крымский канал, romanized: Severo-Krymskii Kanal) formerly known as the North Crimean Canal of Lenin's Komsomol of Ukraine (Note: Ukrainian: Північно-Кримський канал імені ЛКСМУ, romanized: Pivnichno-Krymskyi kanal imeni LKSMU; Russian: Северо-Крымский канал имени Ленинского комсомола Украины, romanized: Severo-Krymsky kanal imeni Leninskogo komsomola Ukrainy) in Soviet times, is a land improvement canal for irrigation and watering of Ukraine's Kherson Oblast and the Crimean Peninsula. The canal has multiple branches throughout Kherson Oblast and Crimea, and is normally active from March until December.

Preparation for construction began in 1957, soon after the transfer of Crimea to the Ukrainian Soviet Socialist Republic in 1954. The main project works took place in three stages between 1961 and 1971. The construction was conducted by the Komsomol members sent by the Komsomol travel ticket (Komsomolskaya putyovka) as part of shock construction projects and accounted for some 10,000 volunteer workers.

Ukraine shut down the canal in 2014 soon after Russia annexed Crimea. Russia restored the flow of water in March 2022 during the Russian invasion of Ukraine. With the destruction of the Kakhovka Dam and its reservoir in 2023, however, the canal can no longer be supplied with water and became dry.

A 2015 study found that the canal had been providing 85% of Crimea's water prior to the 2014 shutdown. Of the water from the canal, 72% went to agriculture and 10% to industry, while water for drinking and other public uses made up 18%.

== Overview ==
The canal begins at the city of Tavriisk, where it draws from the Kakhovka Reservoir fed by the Dnieper river, and runs for 402.6 km (250.2 mi) in a generally southeasterly direction, terminating at the small village of Zelnyi Yar (Lenine Raion). From there, a pipeline carries water to supply the city of Kerch at the eastern extreme of the Crimean Peninsula. Seven water reservoirs lie along the main canal – they are Mizhhirne, Feodosiiske, Frontove, Leninske, Samarlynske, Starokrymske and Stantsiine (Kerchenske).

Water flows by gravity from Tavriisk to Dzhankoi, where it is elevated by four pump stations to a height of over 100 m (330 ft) to energize its continued downstream flow. In Crimea, numerous smaller canals branch off the main channel, including the Razdolne rice canal, Azov rice canal, Krasnohvardiiske distribution canal, Uniting canal, and Saky canal. Through these, water is also supplied to the city of Simferopol.

== History ==
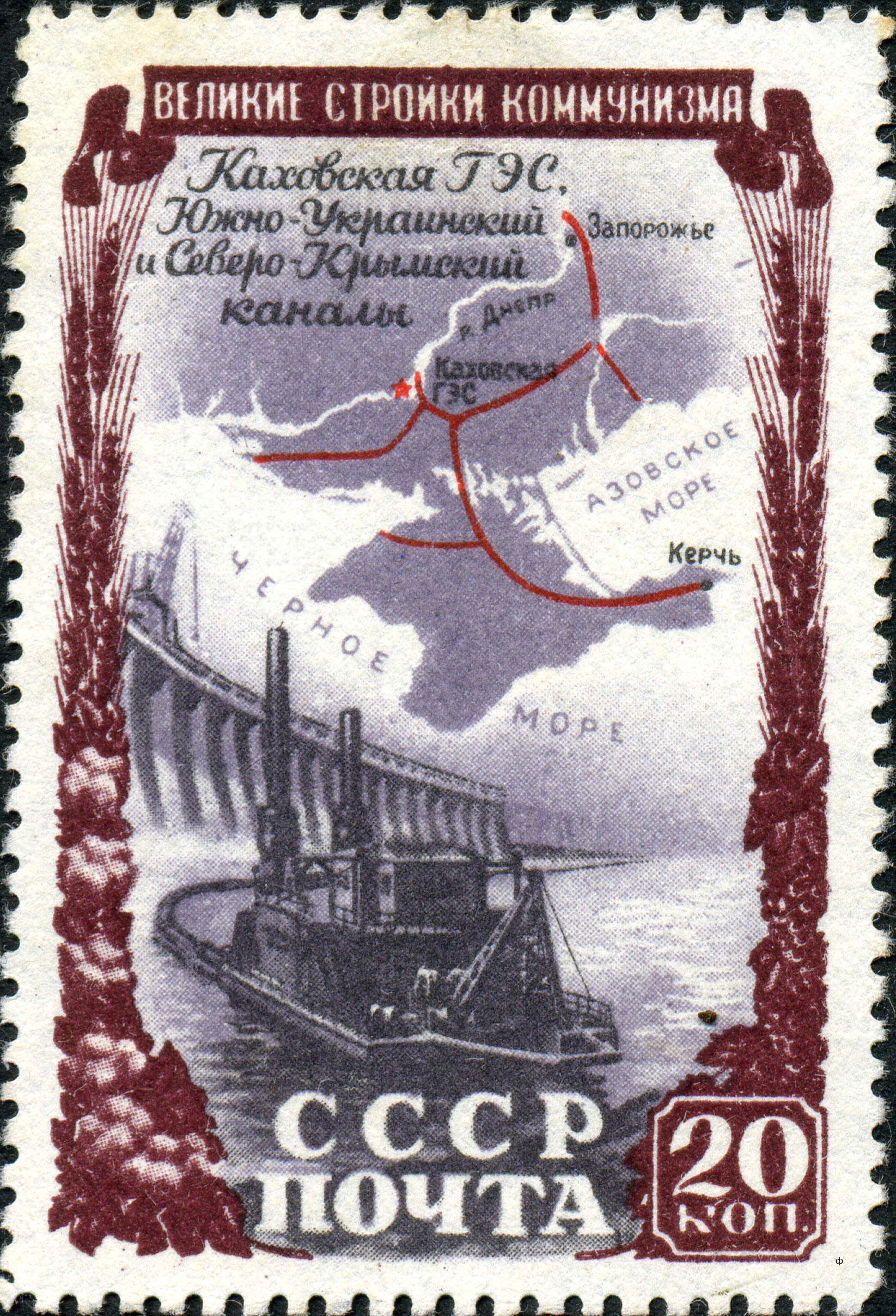
Postage stamp of the USSR Post, 1951

The idea to construct the canal was raised in the 19th century, particularly by the Russian-Finnish botanist Christian von Steven. It was not until after World War II when the decision was adopted in September 1950 by the Central Committee of the Communist Party of the Soviet Union and the Government of the Soviet Union. The decision was to build the Kakhovka Hydro Electric Station, South Ukrainian and North Crimean canals. In 1951 the Soviet postal service released a commemorative post stamp where the North Crimean Canal was categorized as one of the Great Construction Projects of Communism.

Construction of the canal and irrigation systems began in 1957 and was carried out in several stages. The first stage opened in October 1963, carrying water as far as Krasnoperekopsk in the north. In 1965 the canal was completed as far as the city of Dzhankoi in the center of Crimea. In 1971 the city of Kerch was reached. In December 1976 the canal was officially put into operation.

=== 2014–2023 ===
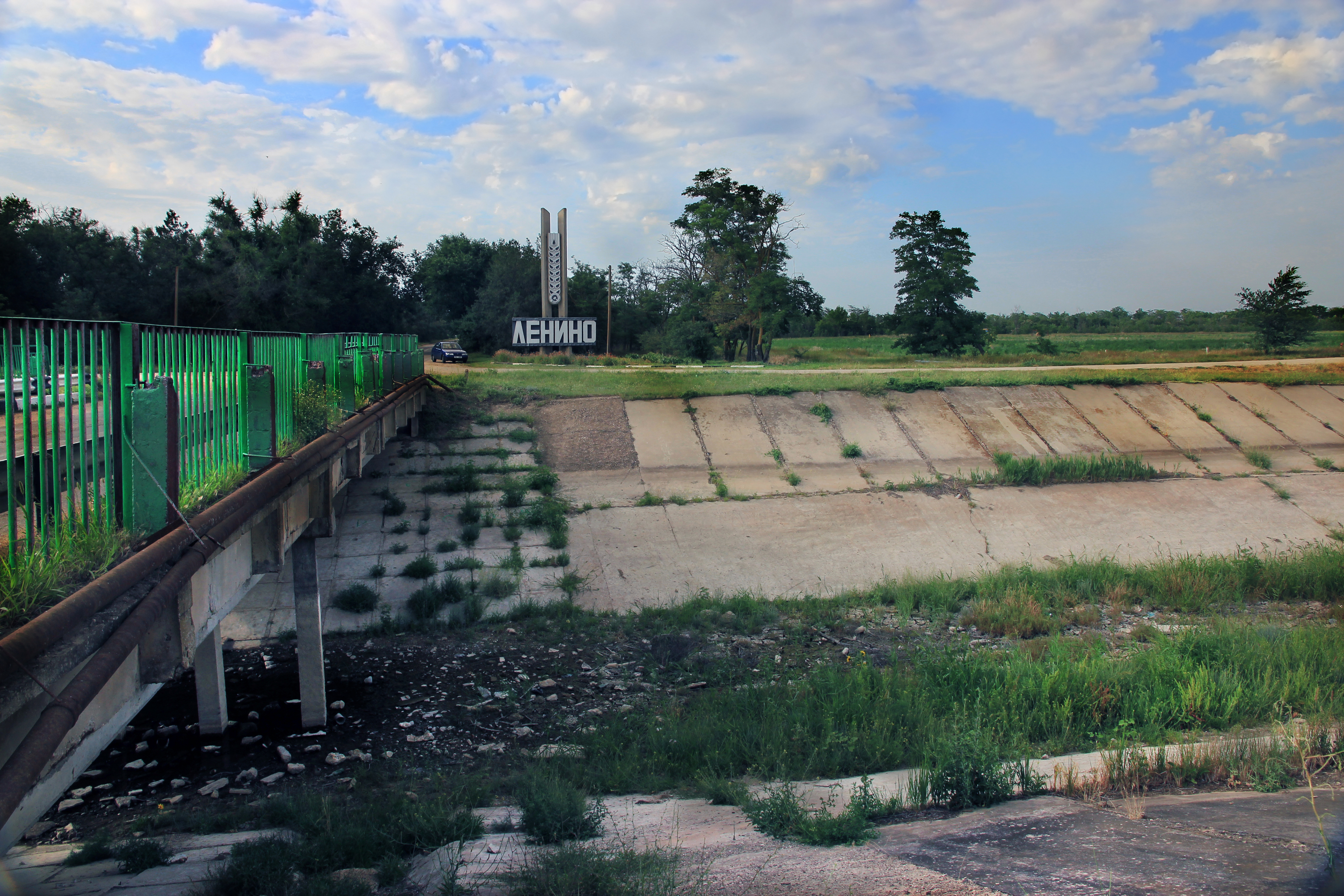
A dry part of the canal near Lenine, Kerch Peninsula, in July 2014

After the Maidan revolution and the subsequent Russian annexation of Crimea in March 2014, Ukrainian authorities greatly reduced the volume of water flowing to the peninsula by means of damming the canal south of Kalanchak, about 15 kilometres (9.3 mi) north of the Crimean border. This began a severe water crisis in Crimea. The reduction caused the peninsula's agricultural harvest, which is heavily dependent on irrigation, to fail in 2014.

Crimean water sources were connected to the North Crimean Canal to replace the former Ukrainian sources. The objective was to restore irrigation and urban supplies to the Kerch Peninsula and to smaller communities on the east coast of Crimea. In 2014, a reservoir was built to store water of the rivers of Eastern Crimea near the village of Novoivanovka, Nyzhnohirskyi Raion. The North Crimean Canal is connected with the Novoivanovka reservoir.

According to official Russian statistics, the Crimean agricultural industry fully overcame the consequences of the blocking of the North Crimean Canal and crop yields grew by a factor of 1.5 from 2013 by 2016. The reported rapid growth in agricultural production in Crimea is due to the fact that, with the help of subsidies in the order of 2–3 billion rubles a year from the budget of the Russian Federation, agricultural producers in Crimea were able to increase their fleet of agricultural machinery.

These official statistics contrast with reports of a massive shrinkage in the area under cultivation in Crimea, from 130,000 hectares in 2013 to just 14,000 in 2017, and an empty canal and a nearly dry reservoir resulting in widespread water shortages, with water only being available for three to five hours a day in 2021. That same year, the New York Times cited senior American officials as stating that securing Crimea's water supply could be an objective of a possible incursion by Russia into Ukraine.

On 24 February 2022, the first day of the Russian invasion of Ukraine, Russian troops advancing from Crimea established control over the North Crimean Canal. The Head of the Republic of Crimea, Sergey Aksyonov, told local authorities to prepare the canal to receive water. Two days later, Russian forces used explosives to destroy the dam that had been blocking the flow since 2014, and water supply resumed.

On the morning of 6 June 2023, a significant portion of the Kakhovka Dam was destroyed releasing a large amount of water downstream. The Kakhovka Reservoir was the source of water for the canal.

According to Christopher Binnie, a water engineer specializing in dams and water resources development, "Pumping for water supply to the Crimea could restart fairly soon." Sergey Aksyonov said that by installing pumps on the Dnieper River, up to 40 m^{3}/sec could be supplied to the canal, and that this would improve the situation.

== Rate of flow ==
The normal flow rate of water in the North Crimean Canal seems to be subject to some disagreement, but according to the Ukrainian State Agency for Water Resources the normal water flow rate in the head of the canal is 82 m^{3}/sec. Concurring roughly with this is Agribusiness Global (90 m^{3}/sec), so the proposed rate by pumping would result in half the normal rate. Water flows through the North Crimean Canal by gravity until it reaches the Dzhankoi district, where it meets the first of a series of pumping stations that must pump it uphill. The first pumping station has a capacity of about 70 m^{3}/sec. According to First Deputy Prime Minister of Russian-annexed Crimea, Rustam Temirgaliyev in 2014, the normal flow of water through the North Crimean Canal was 50 m^{3}/sec. A number of other sources also report this figure. Euromaidan Press reports 294 m^{3}/sec as does another source. On the high end is a source reporting 380 m^{3}/sec, with 80 m^{3}/sec of this going to Kherson and the remainder going to Crimea.

According to a 2023 study, in the early 1990s annual water flows into the canal from the reservoir reached 3.5 km^{3}, but a more economical use of water reduced this to 1.5 km^{3}, of which 0.5 km^{3} was used in the Kherson region and 1 km^{3} in Crimea. In 2014, after the annexation of Crimea, this was reduced to 0.5 km^{3}, according to the study. 1.5 km^{3} is the amount of water that would result from a flow of 47.5 m^{3}/sec for one year. According to a 2017 study in a Russian journal, in 2013, the total water intake of Crimea amounted to 1,553.78 million m^{3}, of which 86.65% came from the North Crimean Canal, 8.78% from local runoff, 4.41% from underground water, and 0.16% from seawater. This means that 1,346.35 million m^{3} came from the canal, which translates to a flow rate of 42.7 m^{3}/sec during 2013, according to this source. If 1/3 of the water entering the North Crimean Canal was distributed in Kherson, as indicated by the 2023 study, and 1,346.35 million m^{3} arrived in Crimea, then this indicates a water flow into the canal during 2013 of 64 m^{3}/sec.

The average flow in the Dnieper River is about 1,670 m^{3}/sec. The amount of water flowing past the intake point of the North Crimean Canal is regulated by the five reservoirs upstream on the Dnieper River, all controlled by Ukraine. Two major canals take in water upstream from the North Crimean Canal, from what was originally the Kakhovka Reservoir: the Kakhovsky Canal and the Dnieper-Kryvyi Rih canal. Also taking water from the former Kakhovka Reservoir were various minor irrigation systems, freshwater fish farms, and systems supplying water to cities such as Zaporizhzhia. The total withdrawal of water from the Kakhovka Reservoir just for large canals was estimated at 900 m^{3}/sec.

== See also ==
- Destruction of the Kakhovka Dam

== Gallery ==
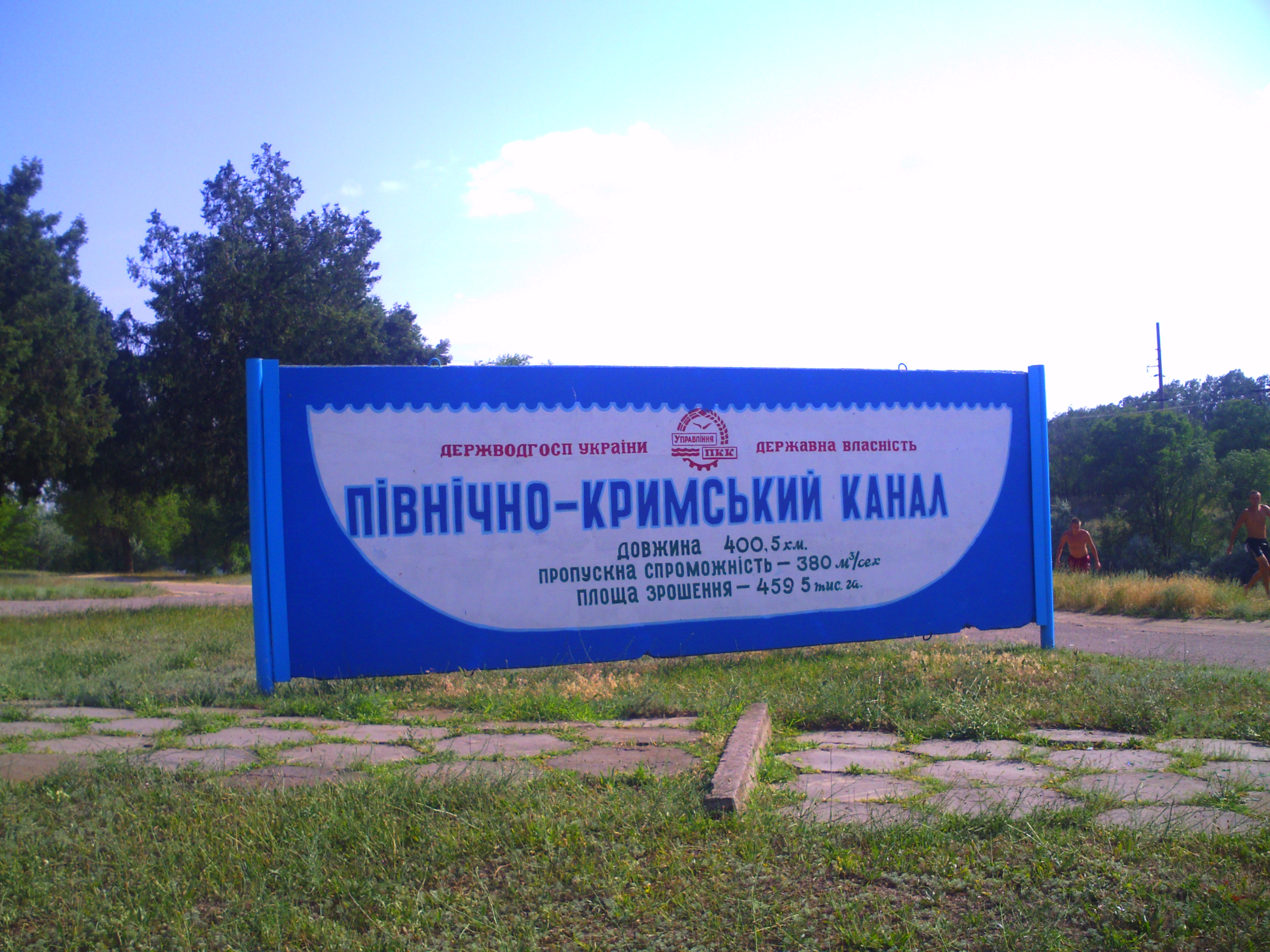
A sign with information about the canal

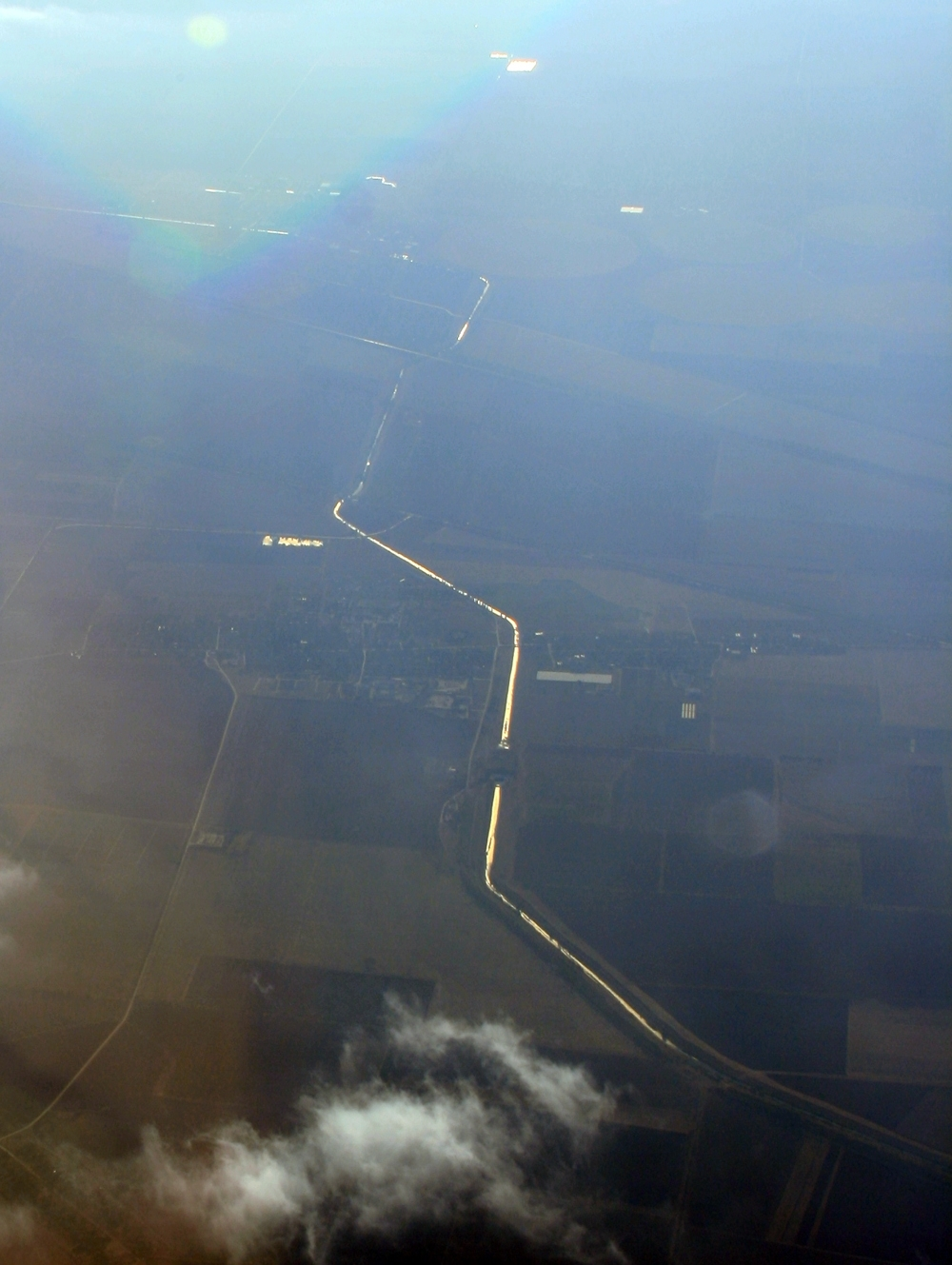
A section of the canal in 2008, to the north of Simferopol

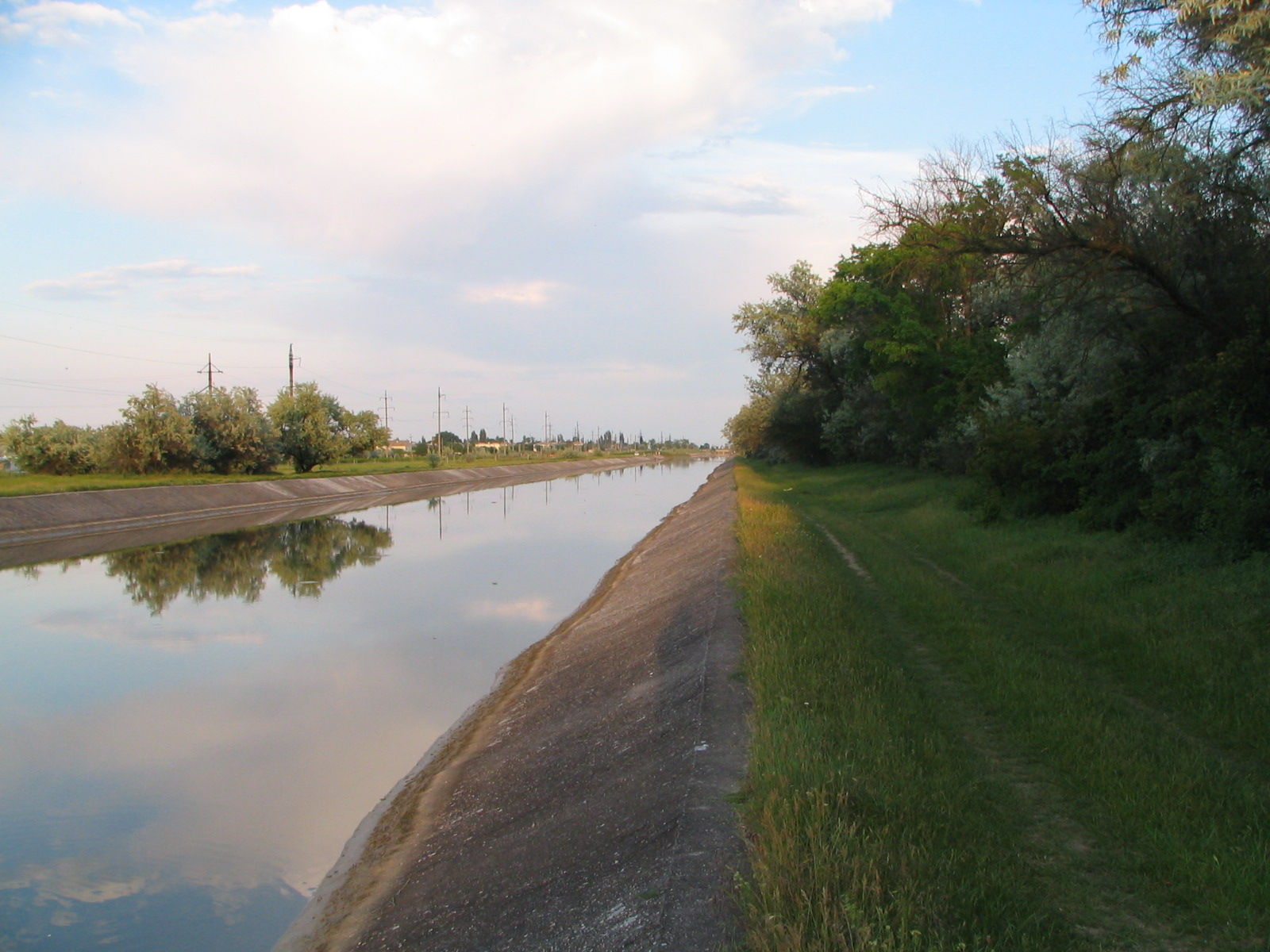
The canal at Sovietskyi, Crimea, in 2010

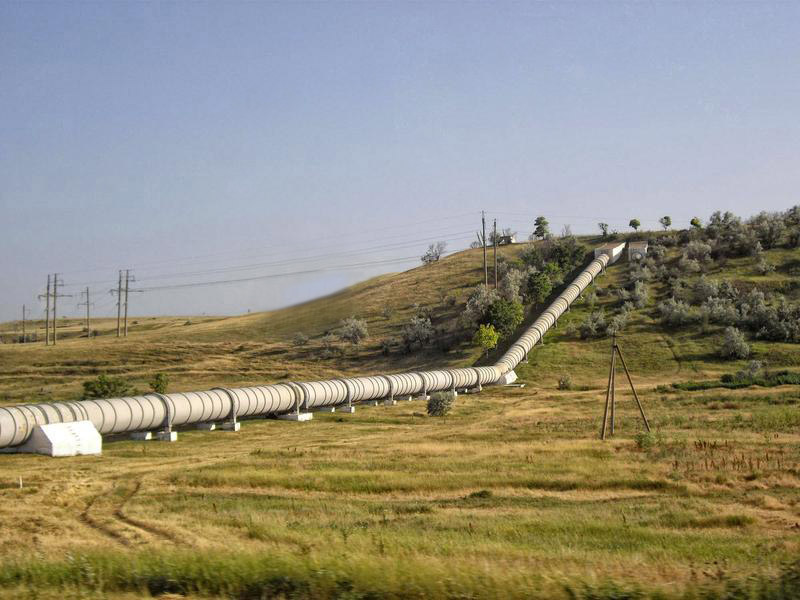
Pipeline - branch of the canal near Simferopol

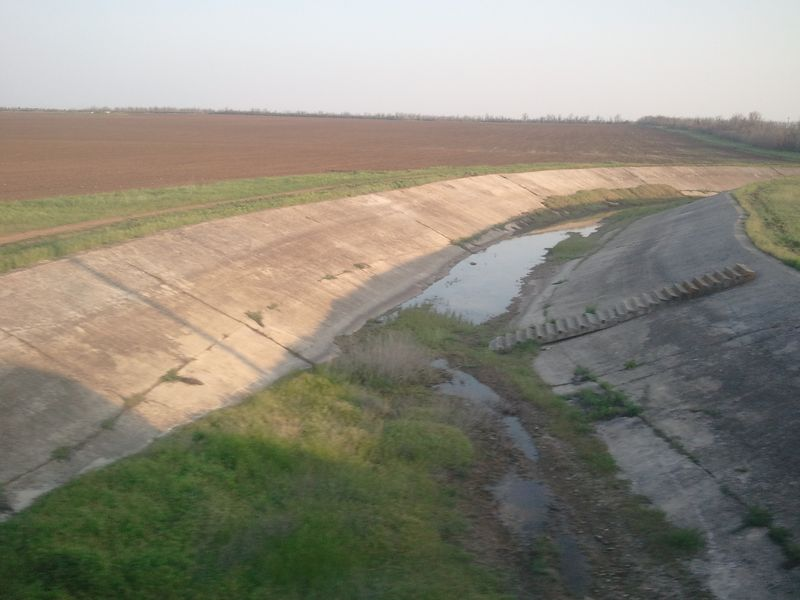
A dry branch of the canal in 2019.
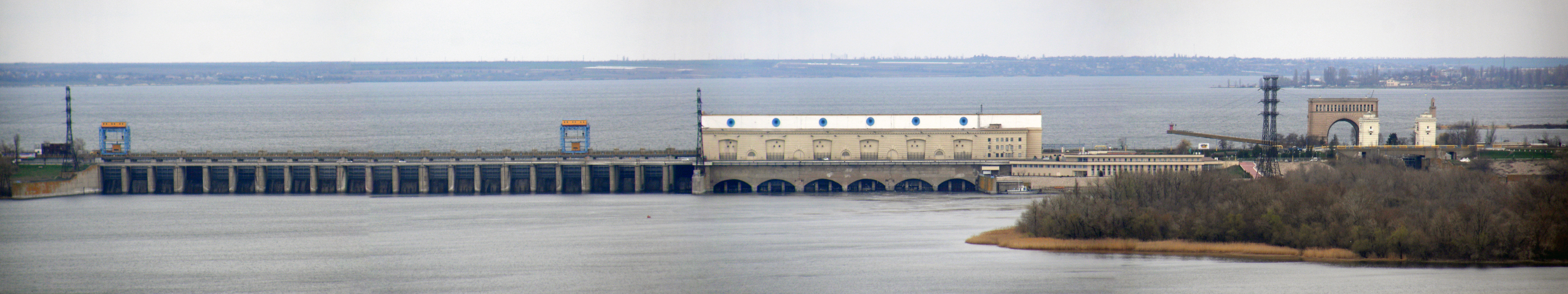
A panorama of the Kakhovka Reservoir and the hydroelectric power station from which the canal begins. In the Summer of 2023, the power station and dam were completely destroyed and the reservoir drained. Without the reservoir the canal could not be supplied with water and became dry.
