= Yarke =

Village in Crimea

Coordinates: 45°08′16″N 35°51′10″E

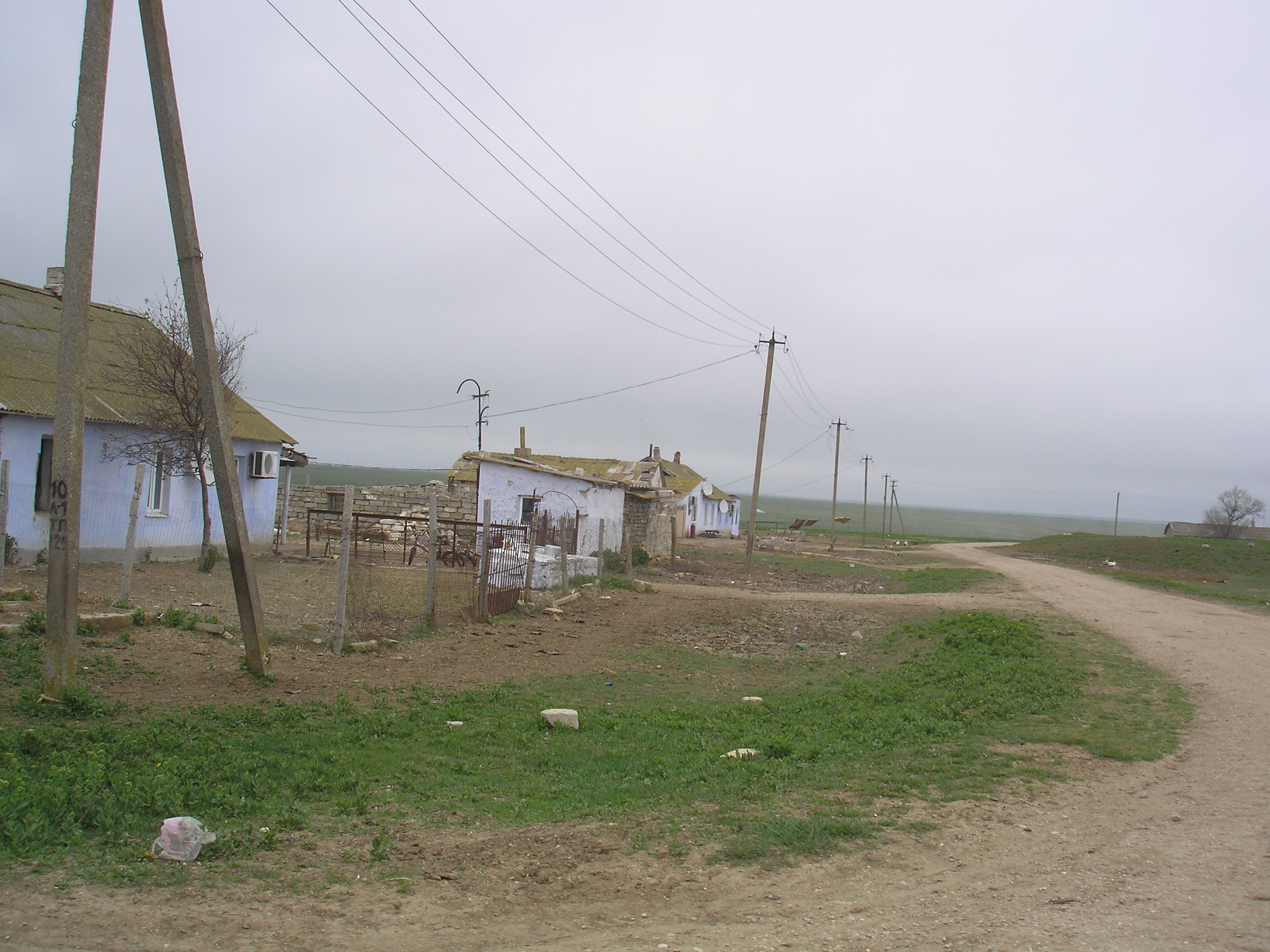
Yarke

Yarke (Russian: Яркое, Ukrainian: Ярке, Crimean Tatar: Baş Qırğız) is a village in the district of Lenine Raion in Crimea.

== Geography ==
Yarke is located in the south of the district and the Kerch Peninsula, to the west of Uzunlarske Lake and the village of Vulkanivka.
