= Marivka, Crimea =

Village in Crimea

Coordinates: 45°14′12″N 36°41′55″E

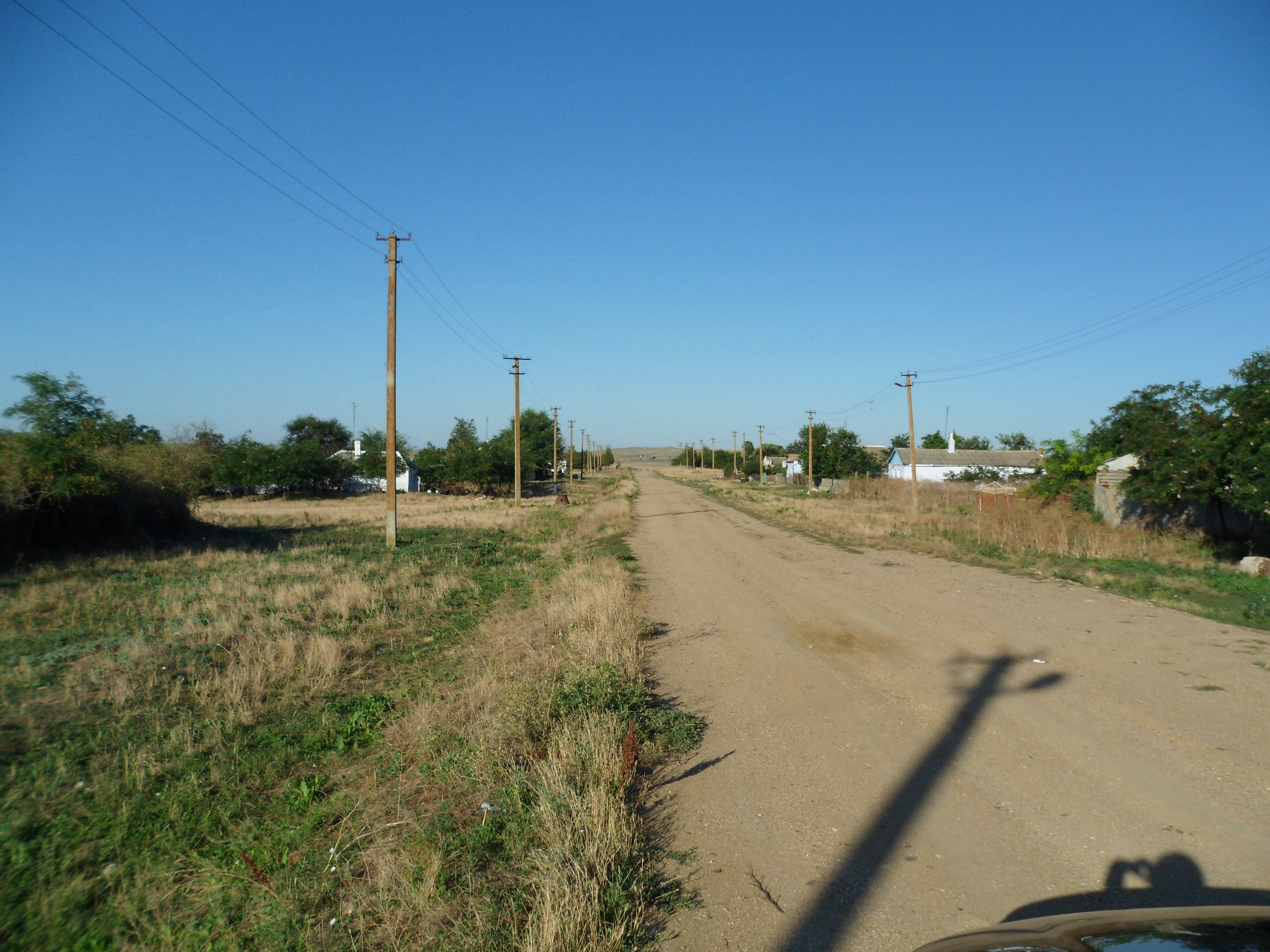
Marivka

Marivka (Ukrainian: Мар'ївка; Russian: Марьевка), is a village in Lenine Raion, Crimea.

== Geography ==
Marivka is located in the south of the raion, west of Zavitne, east of the Uzunlarske Lake.
