= Naberezhne, Crimea =

Village in Crimea

Coordinates: 45°14′12″N 36°41′55″E

Naberezhne (Ukrainian: Набережне, Russian: Набережное), is a village in the district of Lenine Raion in Crimea.

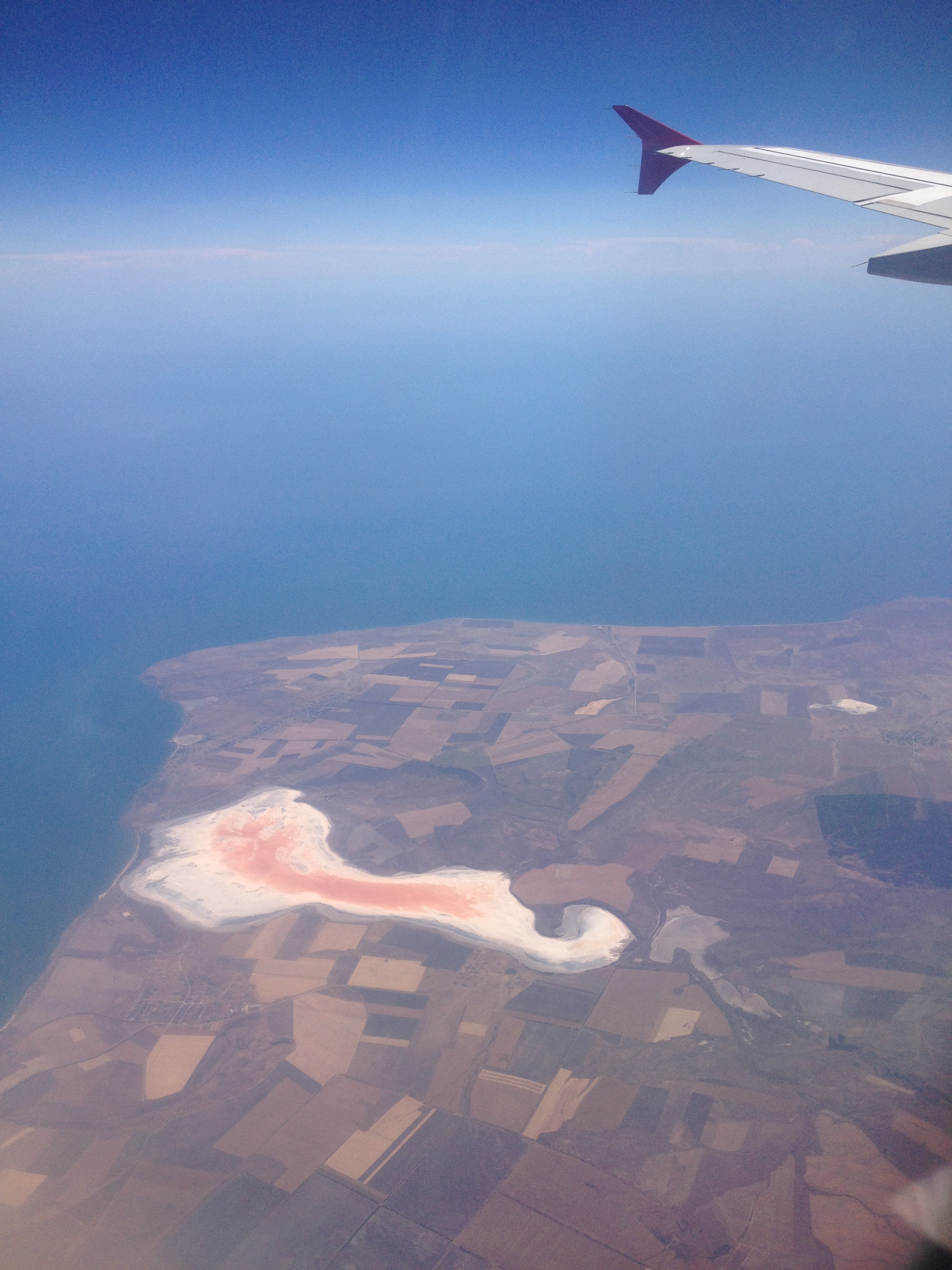
Tobechytske Lake with Naberezhne to the south

== Geography ==
Naberezhne is located in the south-east of the district and the Kerch Peninsula, to the south of Tobechytske Lake and northeast of Zavitne.
