= Vulkanivka =

Village in Crimea

Coordinates: 45°08′22″N 35°56′50″E

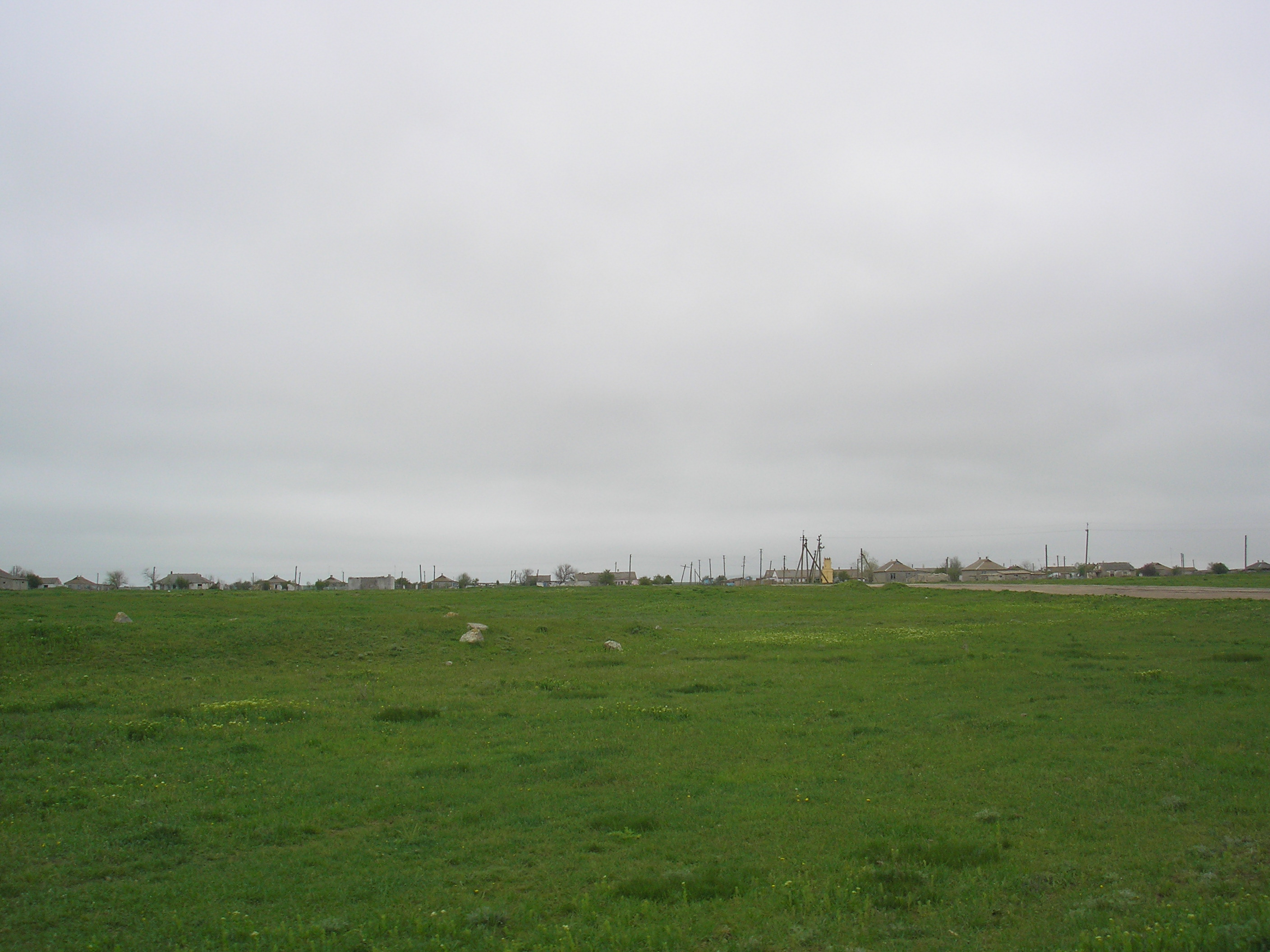
Vulkanivska

Vuckanivska (Russian: Вулка́новка, Ukrainian: Вулканівка, Crimean Tatar: Cav Töbe) is a village in the district of Lenine Raion in Crimea.

== Geography ==
Vulkanivska is located in the south of the district and the Kerch Peninsula, to the west of Uzunlarske Lake, and east of Yarke.
