= Green circle (Crimea) =

Nature reserve in Crimea

- Зелене коло (Ukrainian); Зелёное кольцо (Russian)
- IUCN category IV (habitat/species management area)
- Location within Crimea Location within Ukraine
- Nearest city: Lenine, Crimea
- Coordinates: 45°17′55″N 35°47′00″E
- Area: 172 ha (1.72 km^{2})
- Established: 20 May 1980

The green circle (Ukrainian: Зелене коло, romanized: Zelene kolo; Russian: Зелёное кольцо, romanized: Zelyonoye koltso) is a regional nature reserve (zakaznik) located in Crimea, a territory internationally recognised as part of Ukraine but occupied by Russia since 2014.

== Description ==
The green circle is located in the Kerch Peninsula. Including pine, ash, maple, and honey locust trees, among others, the green circle was established as a reforestation initiative on the relatively treeless Pontic–Caspian steppe. It is located within the urban-type settlement of Lenine. On 20 May 1980, the Cabinet of Ministers of the Ukrainian SSR recognised the green circle as a regional nature reserve.

The Tavrida Highway is located 3 km (9,800 ft) from the green circle, a development which has caused environmental concerns. According to plans, green corridors will be provided for to prevent environmental destruction caused by the Tavrida Highway's construction.
