= Opuk Nature Reserve =

Massif and nature reserve in Crimea

- Ukrainian: Опуцький природний заповідник
- IUCN category Ia (strict nature reserve)
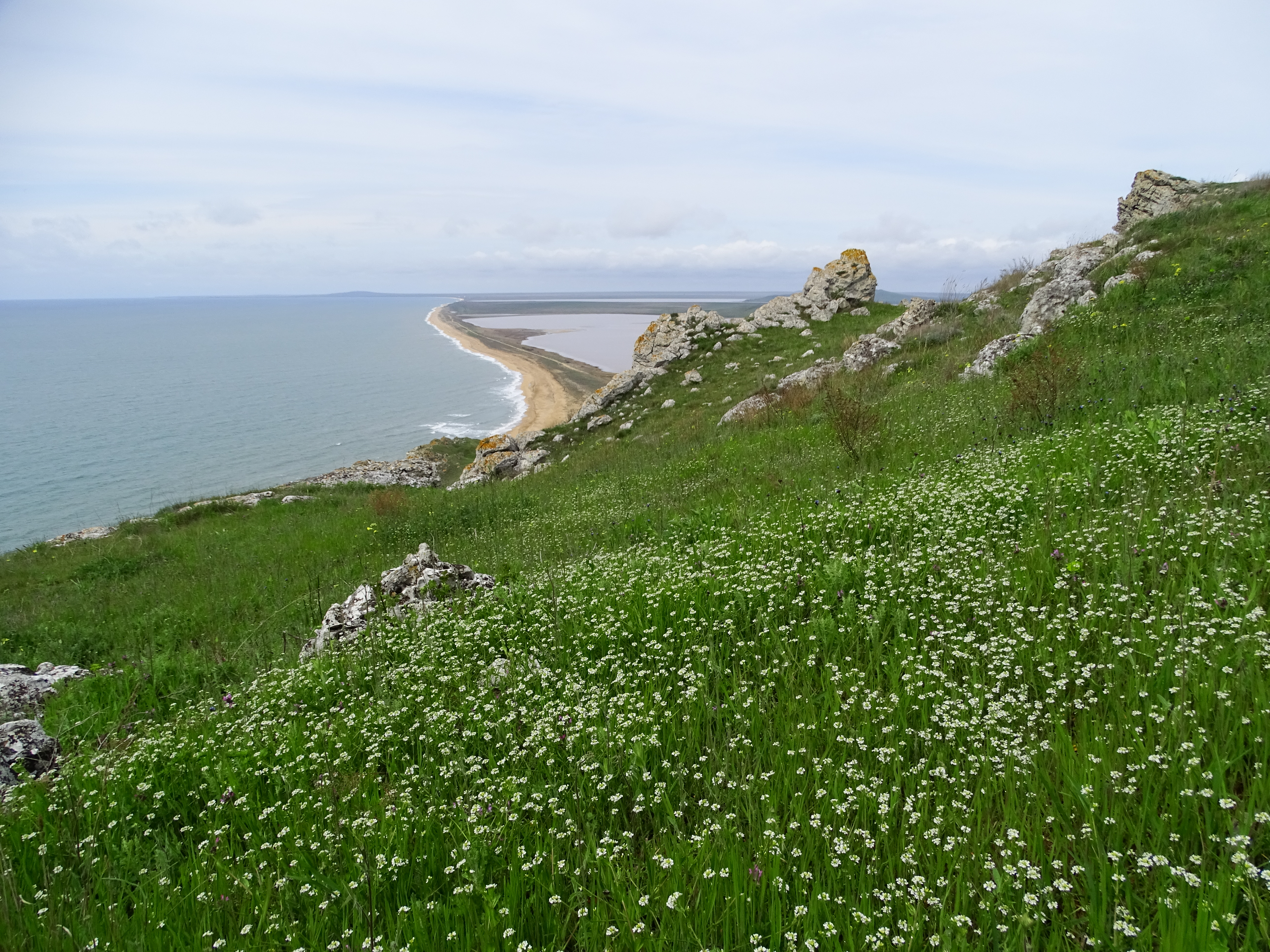
- Opuk Nature Reserve

- Location within Crimea
- Location: Crimea
- Nearest city: Kerch
- Coordinates: 45°01′50″N 36°11′10″E
- Area: 1,592 hectares (3,934 acres; 16 km^{2}; 6 sq mi)
- Established: 1998; 28 years ago
- Governing body: Ministry of Ecology and Natural Resources (Ukraine) (de jure); Ministry of Natural Resources and Environment (Russia) (de facto)
- Website: http://opuk.com.ua/index_en.html

Opuk Nature Reserve (Ukrainian: Опуцький природний заповідник) is a protected nature reserve located on the southern coast of the Kerch Peninsula on the Black Sea. It is centered on a limestone massif (Opuk (mountain)) rising from the kerch plains, and a salt lake (Lake Koiaske). The site is a Ramsar Wetland of International Importance.

== Topography ==
The site is 30 kilometres (19 mi) southwest of the city of kerch, on the south coast. Opuk Mountain in the reserve is the highest point on the Kerch Peninsula, at 185 meters above sea level. It is a table mountain composed of reef limestone, as is much of the karst landscape and offshore islands surrounding it. This distinguishes the reserve from the plains of the Kerch Peninsula around it. To the west of Mount Opuk is a Lake Koiaske, a shallow salt lake, and the larger Uzunlarske Lake. The coastal terrain also features sandy-coquina spits.

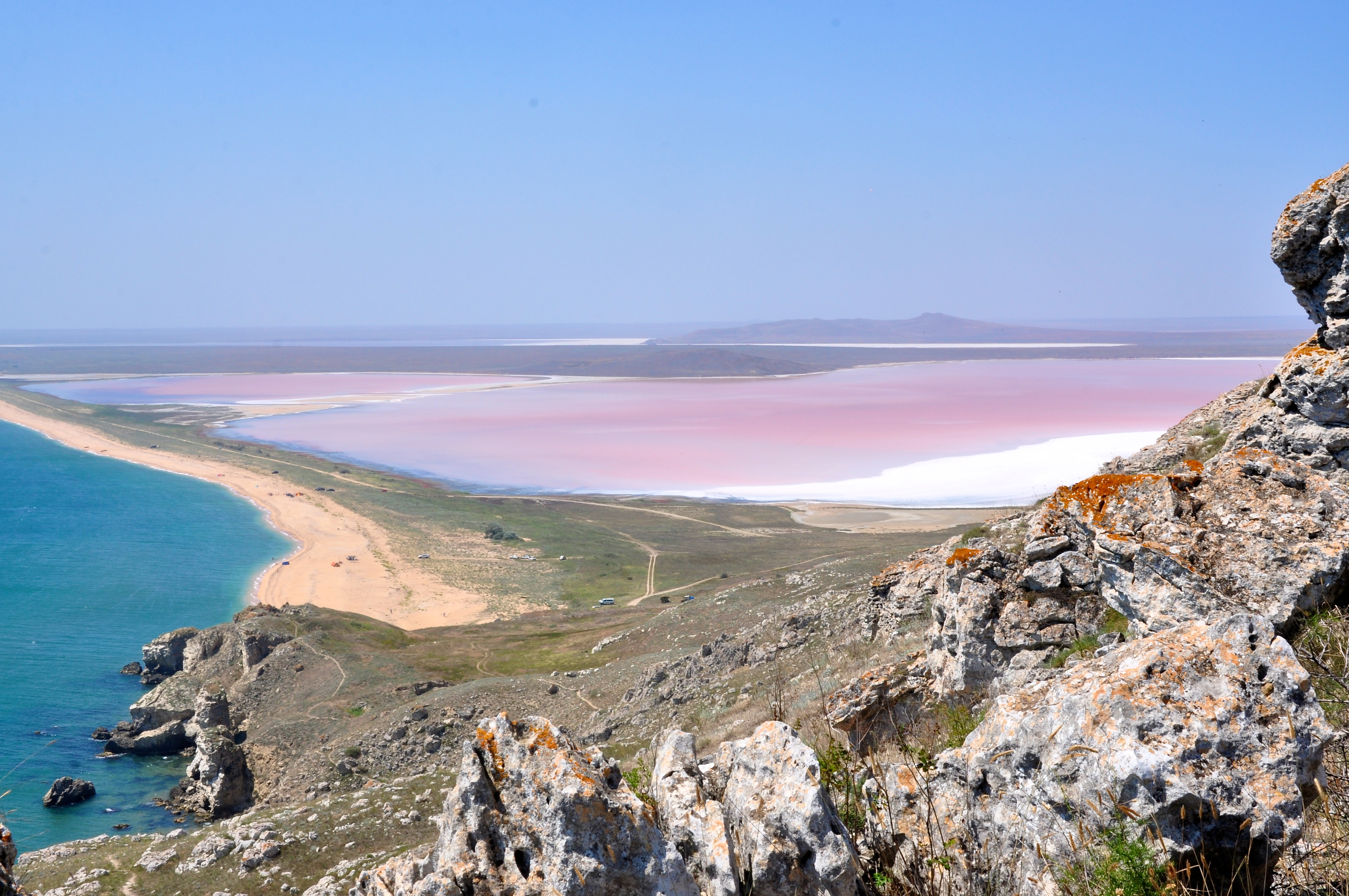
View west from Mount Opuk, overlooking the saline Lake Koiaske

== Climate and ecoregion ==
The climate of Opuk is Humid continental climate - Hot summer sub-type (Köppen climate classification Dfa), with large seasonal temperature differentials and a hot summer (at least one month averaging over 22 °C (72 °F), and mild winters. Average temperatures in the reserve range from 2.0 °C (35.6 °F) in January to 23 °C (73 °F) in July, and annual precipitation averages 270 mm.

The reserve is located in the Pontic–Caspian steppe ecoregion, a region that covers an expanse of grasslands stretching from the northern shores of the Black Sea to western Kazakhstan.

== Flora and fauna ==
The higher ground exhibits plants of coastal steppe varieties, the sandy spits support Crambe and other species endemic to the Crimean Peninsula. The reserve is important of it support of birds, with over 200 species having been recorded on the site.

== Public use ==
As a strict nature reserve, Opuk Nature Reserve's primary purpose is protection of nature and scientific study. Public access is limited: mass recreation and construction of facilities is prohibited, as are hunting and fishing. There are three ecological trails on which employees of the reserve conduct guided educational tours.

== See also ==
- Lists of Nature Preserves of Ukraine (class Ia protected areas)
- National Parks of Ukraine (class II protected areas)
- Opuk (mountain)
