= Ohonky =

Village in Crimea

Coordinates: 45°11′35″N 36°19′37″E

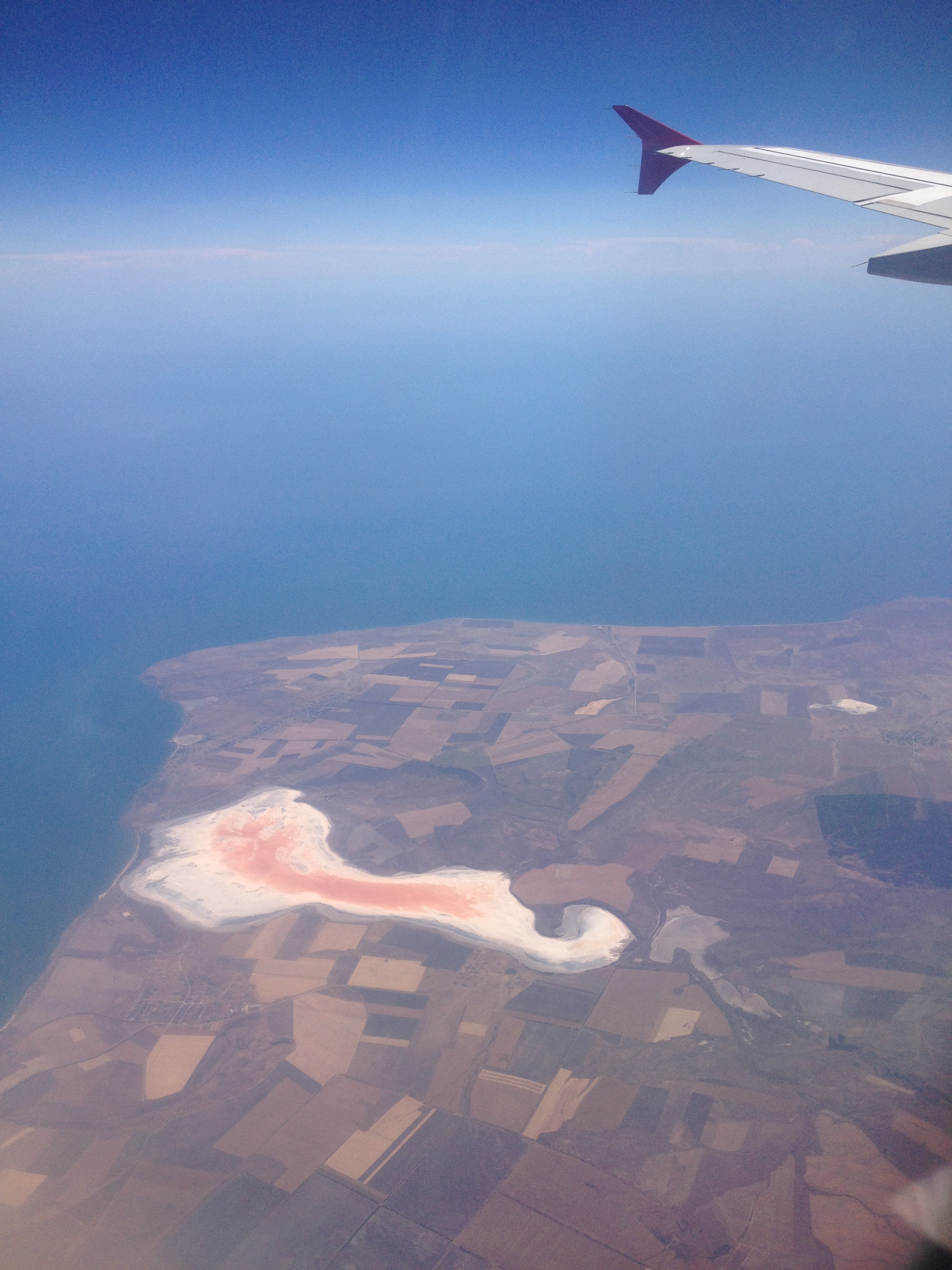
Aerial view of Tobechytske Lake with Ohon'kyon the north shore.

Ohonky (Russian and Ukrainian: Огоньки) or Orta-Yely (Ukrainian: Орта́-Эли́, Crimean Tatar: Orta Eli) is a village in Lenine Raion, Crimea.

== Geography ==
Ohonky is located in the south-east of the district and the Kerch Peninsula, in an unnamed gully at its confluence from the north into Tobechytske Lake.
