= Frontove =

Village in Crimea

Frontove Фронтове
- Village
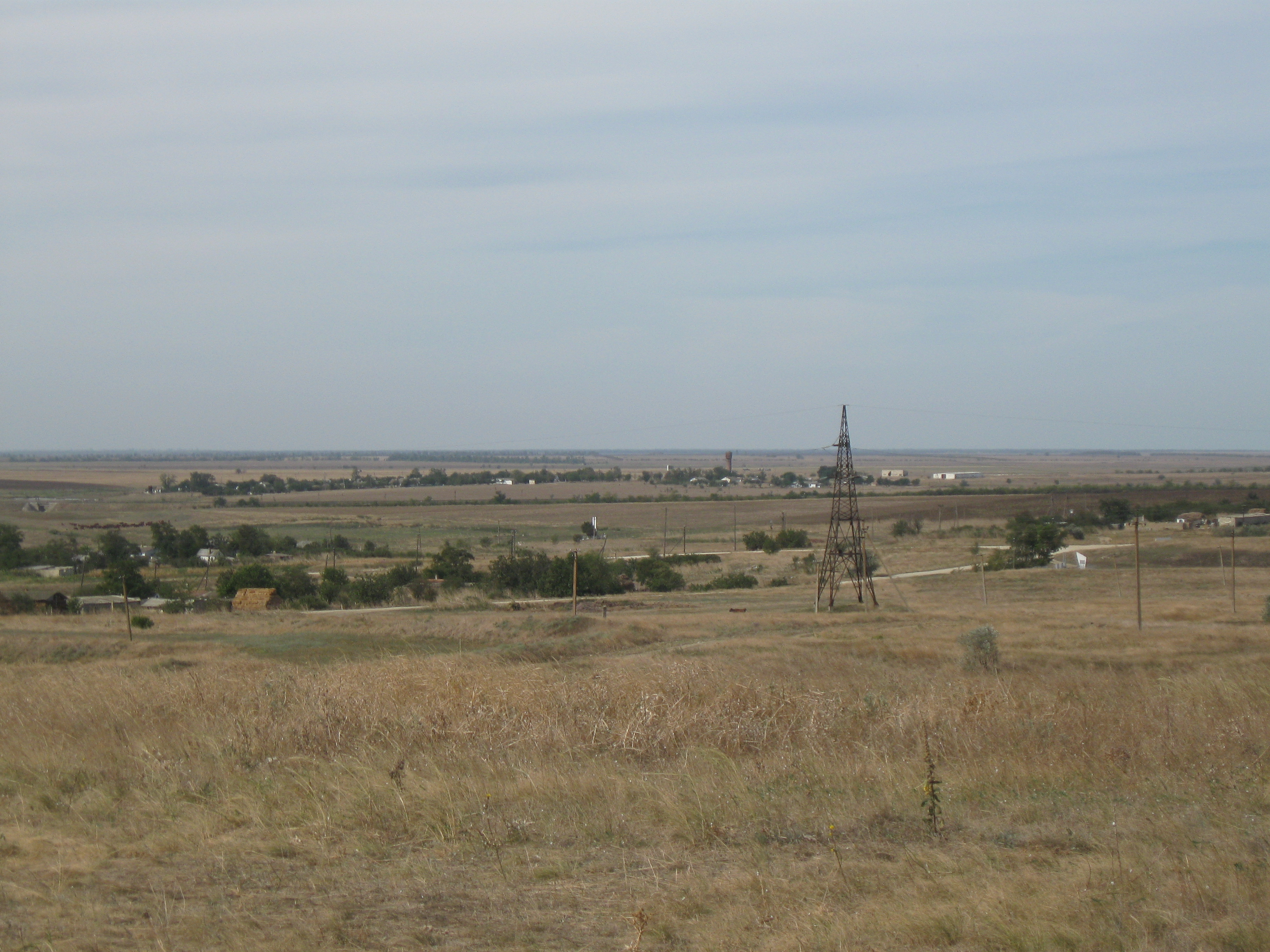
- Frontove

- Location of Frontove in Crimea
- Coordinates: 45°11′46″N 35°27′15″E
- Republic: Crimea
- Municipality: Sudak Municipality
- First mentioned: 1686

Area
  - Total: 0.71 km^{2} (0.27 sq mi)
- Elevation: 81 m (266 ft)

Population (2014)
  - Total: 1,006
  - Density: 1,400/km^{2} (3,700/sq mi)
- Time zone: UTC+4 (MSK)
- Postal code: 98026
- Area code: +380 6566

Frontove (Russian: Фронтовое, Ukrainian: Фронтове, Crimean Tatar: Qoy Asan) is a village in the district of Lenine Raion in Crimea. It appears in English-language histories of the Battle of Kerch Peninsula as Koi-Asan.

== Geography ==
Frontove is located to the north of Feodosia, west of the Kerch Peninsula. The North Crimean Canal passes to the south of the village, with the Frontove Reservoir located directly south-east.
