= Opuk (mountain) =

Mountain in Kerch Peninsula, Crimea

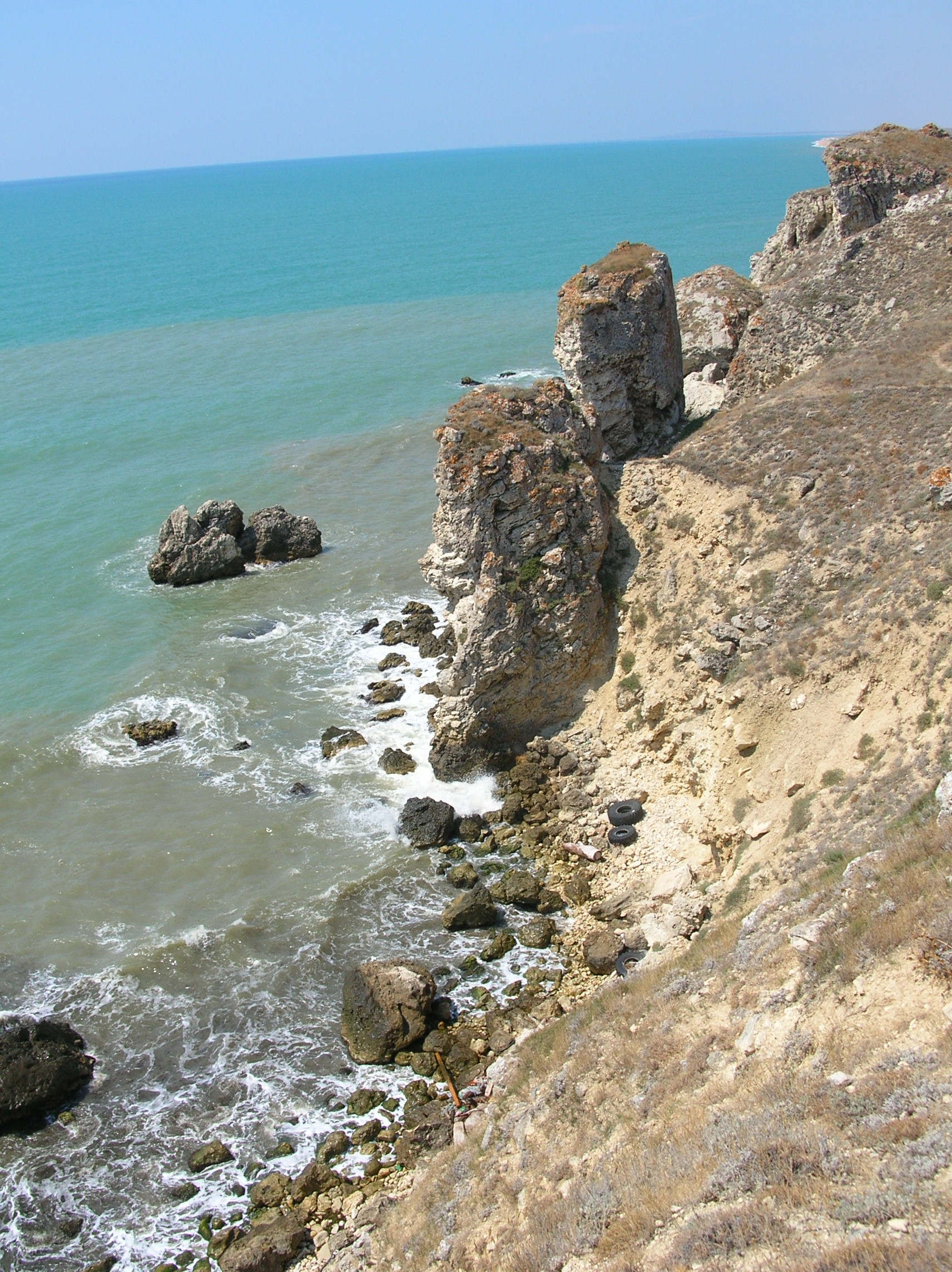
- Opuk from the sea side

Highest point
- Elevation: 183 m (600 ft)
- Coordinates: 45°2′15″N 36°13′25″E

Geography
- Location within Crimea Location within Ukraine
- Countries: Russia, Ukraine
- Region: Crimea

Opuk (Ukrainian: Опук; Crimean Tatar: Opuk, Опук) is a mountain 183 meters high, located on Opuk cape, on the southern tip of the Kerch Peninsula, in Crimea, the highest point in the area. The Opuk massif was declared the Opuk Nature Reserve in 1998. The slopes of Opuk mountain are a combination of stepped ledges, steep precipices, chasms and stone placers.

== Geology ==
Opuk mountain is an isolated synclinal fold composed of Meotian limestones underlain by Sarmatian clays. The fold is strongly dissected by faults (seismogenic ditches), and several small natural caves, such as the Opukskaya-Yubileinaya discovered in 1996, are found in it, partially filled with clastic material.

== Archeology ==
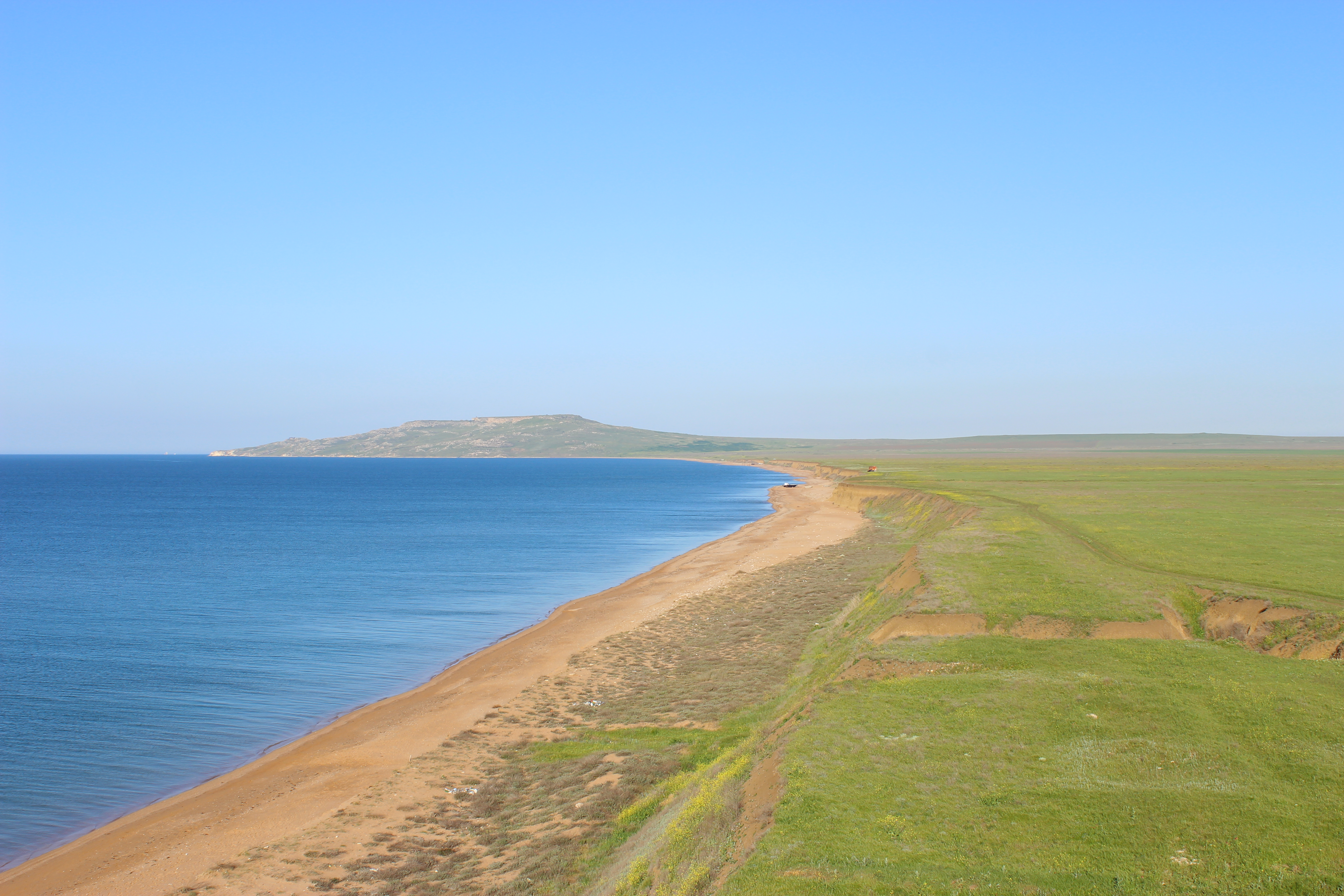
View of Opuk mountain

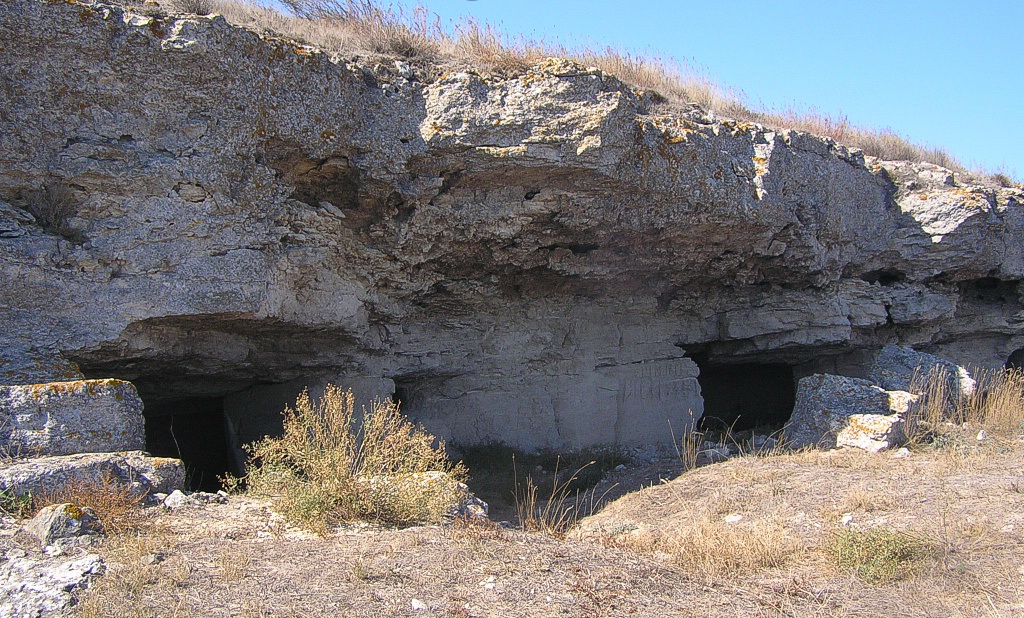
Opuk quarries

The earliest ancient Greek settlements on the mountain date back to the turn of the 6th and 5th centuries BC. Fragments of early Chios amphorae and painted black-lacquer table pottery have been found.

In the V century BC at the foot of the mountain was a Greek settlement — Kimmerikon, which was part of the Bosporan Kingdom. Remains of structures, house foundations and walls have been preserved here. There are also remains of structures on the top of the mountain.

Opuk quarries are located on the syncline's eastern wing, on the upper plateau's cliff. The total length of excavations is small — about 790 m. About 500 m to the southwest is another relatively small quarry. At present, due to the destruction of the rock and a large number of rockfalls, it is dangerous for unprepared excursionists to visit the quarries.

== Fortress ==
The fortress on the eastern summit of Opuk mountain was first built in the I century B.C. It may have been associated with the Cimmerian shaft.

The cultural strata of the citadel contain much material from the late II—III centuries A.D. This could be related to the activities of the Bosporan king Tiberius Julius Sauromates II Philocaesar Philoromaios Eusebes (174–210).

The new citadel is dated IV—VI centuries A.D. At that time the area became a borderland between the possessions of Chersonesus and the Bosporan Kingdom.

The Russian researcher Paul Du Brux was the first to explore this monument from 1817 to 1830.

Since 1989, the fortress has been investigated by the South Bosporus Archaeological Expedition under the leadership of V.K. Golenko. A stele with four runic signs was found in the grotto under the citadel in 1996. At first, it was dated to the middle of the IV century. Currently the stone is kept in the Central Museum of Tavrida in Simferopol. However, already in 2010 N. F. Fedoseev in his article disavowed all these constructions. The inscription was made by O. Kupriyanenko, a Kerch resident fond of esotericism, in 1994 as part of artistic trials. In two years it underwent a natural aging process and was discovered by V. K. Golenko. Later, the success of the "sensational find" generated a whole boom of "runic stones" on the Kerch Peninsula.

== Conservation and significance ==
Opuk mountain and the area of Opuk cape, as well as the adjacent sea area (together with nearby sites including Koyashskoye Salt Lake), are a nature reserve. Opuk Nature Reserve and wetlands of international importance "Aquatic-coastal complex of Cape Opuk and the islands of Skaly Korabli" (Ukrainian: Прибережний аквальний комплекс біля миса Опук та островів Скелі-Кораблі, Russian: Прибрежный аквальный комплекс у мыса Опук и островов Скалы-Корабли) with a total area of 1,592.3 ha, created in Ukraine in 1998 and re-approved in the Russian Federation according to the Order of the Council of Ministers of the Republic of Crimea from 05.02.2015 No. 69-p "On Approval of the List of Specially Protected Natural Areas of Regional Importance of the Republic of Crimea".

== See also ==
- Crimea
- Kerch Peninsula
- Opuk Nature Reserve

== Bibliography ==
- Драган, Н.А. (2006). "Почвы окрестностей Опукского природного заповедника". Труды НБС ННЦ. 126: 34–44.
- Вахрушев, Б. А. (2002). "Пещеры Опукского спелеорайона на Керченском полуострове (Крым)" (PDF). Свет (1-2(22-23)): 15–17. Archived from the original (PDF) on 2020-07-21.
- Вахрушев, Б.А; Вахрушев, И.Б. (2006). "Заповедные объекты массива горы Опук и сопредельных территорий". Труды НБС ННЦ. 126: 23–33.
- Климчук, А. Б.; Амеличев, Г. Н.; Вахрушев, Б. А.; Тимохина, Е. И.; Науменко, В. Г. (2014). "Проявление гипогенного карста в Опукском массиве на Керченском полуострове" (PDF). Спелеология и карстология (12): 57–68. Archived from the original (PDF) on 2022-03-13.
- Корженков, А.М.; Мордвинцева, В.И.; Овсюченко, А.Н.; Стрельников, А.А.; Ларьков, А.С. (2021). "Сейсмические деформации на археологических памятниках, в отложениях и рельефе горы Опук, Крым" (PDF). Вопросы инженерной сейсмологии. 2. Vol. 48. pp. 62–103. ISSN 0132-2826.
- Сохин, М. Ю. (2020). "Типология и краткий обзор подземных выработок Керченского полуострова" (PDF). Учёные записки КФУ им. В. И. Вернадского. География. Геология. 2. Vol. 6. pp. 266–267. Archived from the original (PDF) on 2021-01-29.
- Грек, И. О. (2017). "Реестр каменоломен Керченского полуострова. Исследование каменоломен экспедициями клуба "Поиск"". Военно-исторические чтения Vol. 4. Неизвестное становится известным. Simferopol: Бизнес-Информ. pp. 85–96.
- Голенко, В.К. (1999). "К вопросу о времени сооружения "цитадели" на горе Опук". In Золотарев, М.И. (ed.). Херсонесский сборник. 10. Collection of scientific articles. Sevastopol: Национальный заповедник "Херсонес Таврический"; Крымский филиал Института археологии НАНУ.
- Голенко, В.К. (2006). "Основные этапы освоения горы Опук и её окрестностей" (PDF). Труды Никитского ботанического сада – Национального научного центра. Vol. 126. Archived from the original (PDF) on 2018-02-21.
- Голенко, В.К. (2007). Древний Киммерик и его округа (PDF). Simferopol: Сонат.
