= Cheliadinove =

Village in Crimea, Ukraine

Coordinates: 45°12′21″N 36°22′26″E

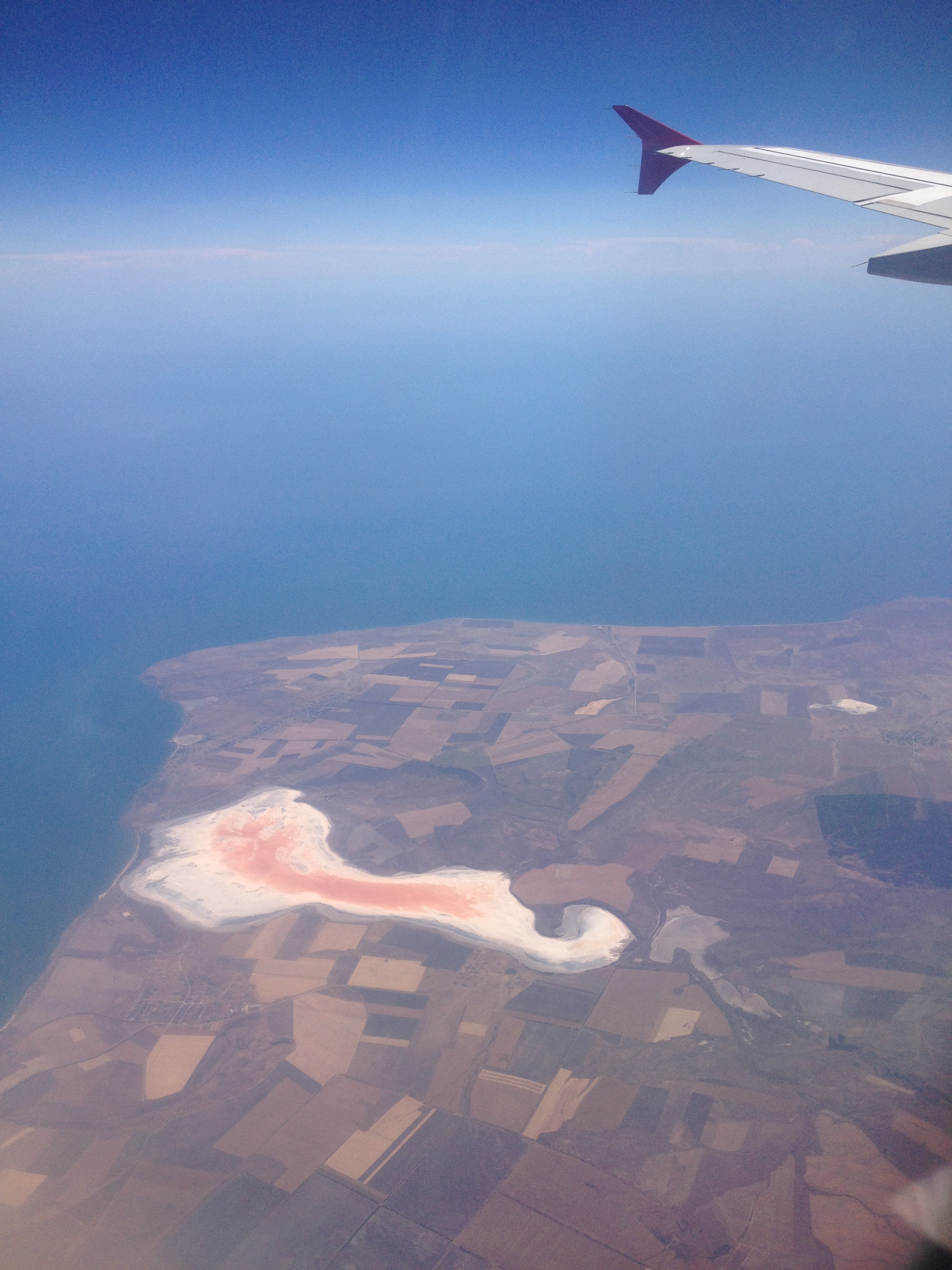
Aerial view of Tobechytske Lake with Cheliadinove on the north shore.

Cheliadinove (Russian: Челядиново; Ukrainian: Челядінове; Crimean Tatar: Töbeçik) is a village in Lenine Raion, Crimea, Ukraine.

== Geography ==
Cheliadinove is located in the south-east of the district and the Kerch Peninsula, in an unnamed gully at its confluence from the north into Tobechytske Lake.
