= Naberezhne =

Naberezhne may refer to these villages in Ukraine.

- Naberezhne, Buchach Raion
- Naberezhne (Crimea)
- Naberezhne, Demydivka Raion
- Naberezhne, Halych Raion
- Naberezhne, Odesa Oblast
