= Kostyrine =

Village in Crimea

Coordinates: 45°15′19″N 36°37′16″E

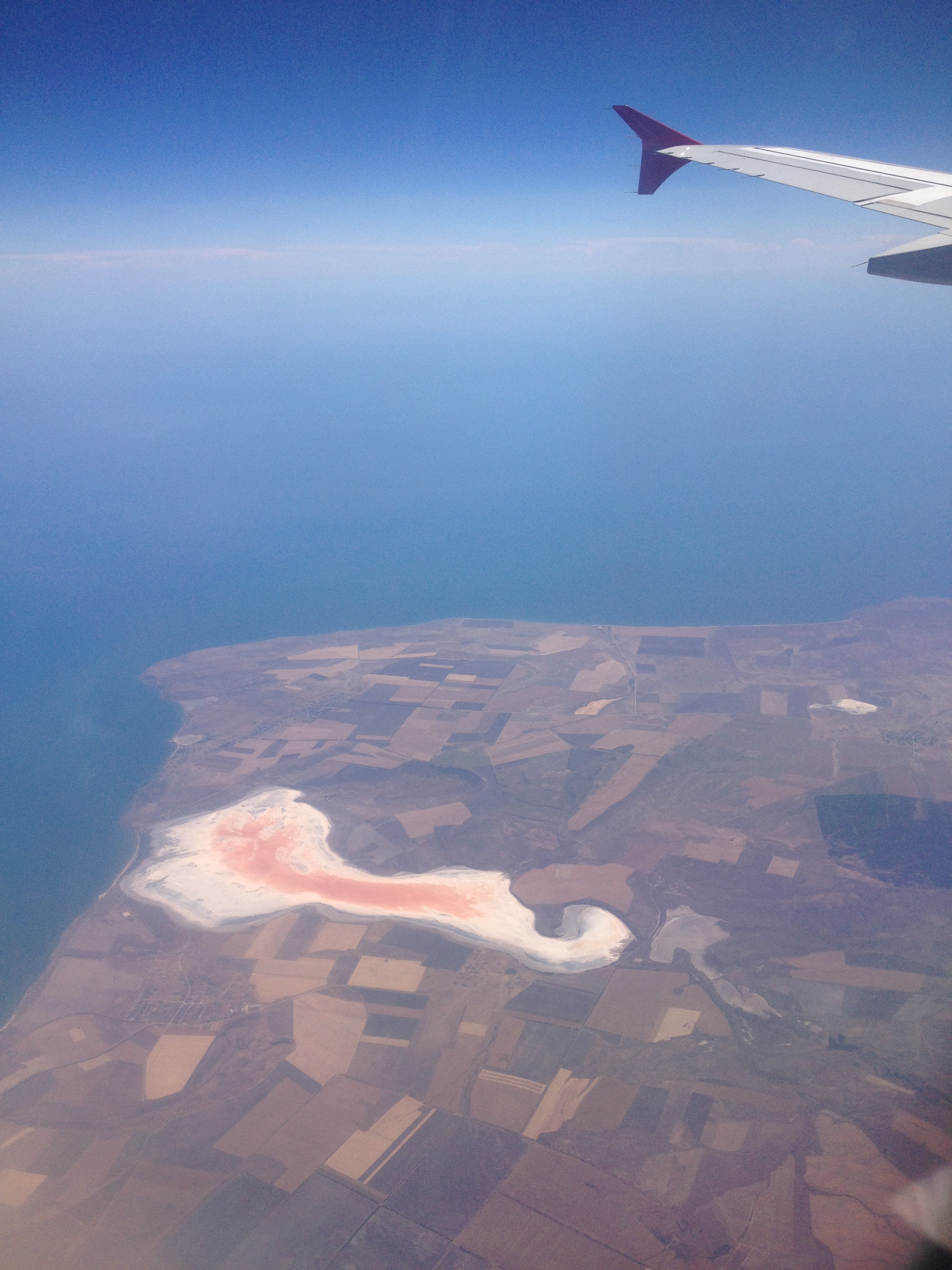
Aerial view of Tobechytske Lake with Kostyrine on the south shore.

Kostyrine (Russian: Костырино, Ukrainian: Костиріне, Crimean Tatar: Çöñgelek) is a village in the district of Lenine Raion in Crimea.

== Geography ==
Kostyrine is located in the south-east of the district and the Kerch Peninsula, on the southern shore of Tobechytske Lake.
