= Yehorove =

Village in Lenine Raion, Crimea

Coordinates: 45°23′12″N 36°29′00″E

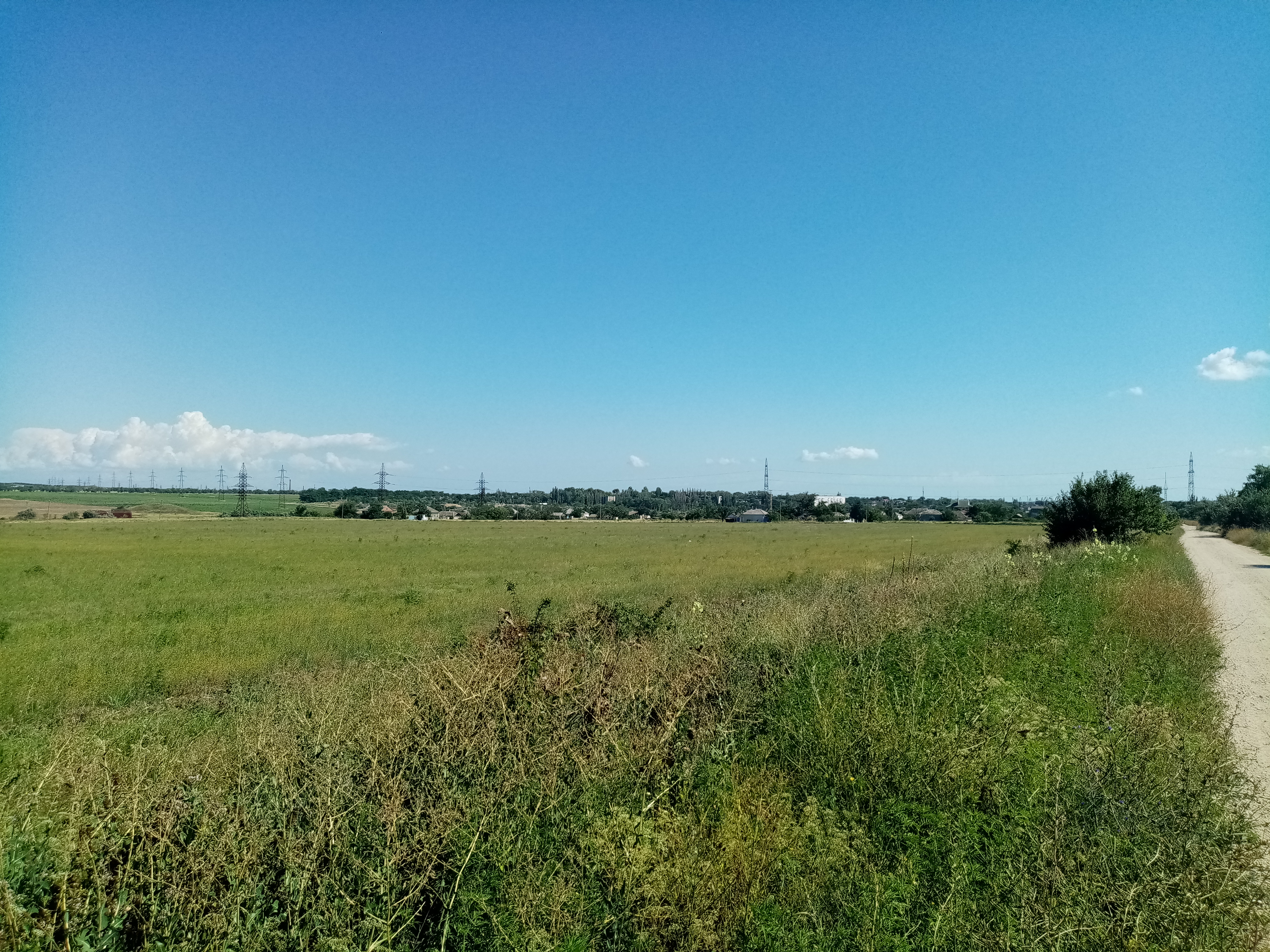

Yehorove (Ukrainian: Єгорове; Russian: Его́рово, romanized: Yegorovo; Crimean Tatar: Yegorovo) is a village in Lenine Raion, Crimea. According to the 2001 Ukrainian census, the native languages of the inhabitants of the village were 89.29% Russian, 8.93% Ukrainian, and 1.79% Belarusian.

On 18 March 1948, by an edict of the Presidium of the Supreme Soviet of the Russian SFSR, the settlement, formerly known as the collective farm Sakko i Vantsetti, was given its current name Yehorove.
