= Zavitne =

Village in Crimea

Coordinates: 45°07′05″N 36°23′37″E

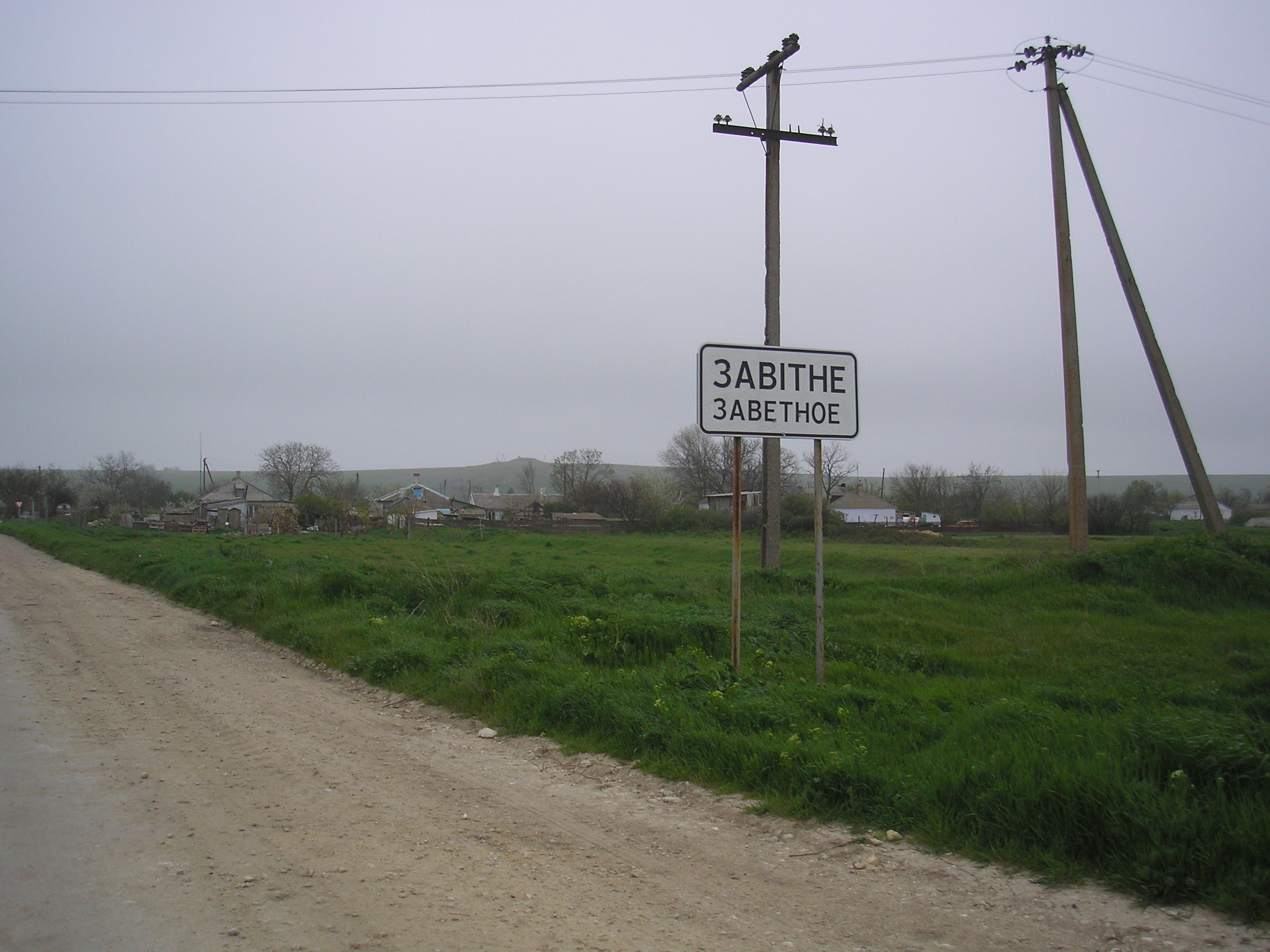

Zavitne (Ukrainian: Zavitne, Russian: Заветное, Crimean Tatar: Yanış Taqıl) is a village in the district of Lenine Raion in Crimea.

== Geography ==
Kostyrine is located in the south-east of the district and the Kerch Peninsula, to the south of Tobechytske Lake.

== Demographics ==
As of the 2001 Ukrainian census, the village had a population of 1,416 inhabitants. The overwhelming majority of the population consisted of Ukrainians, Russians and Crimean Tatars, smaller Belarusian and Armenians also exist in the settlement. In terms of languages, Russian is the lingua franca, since most non-Russians living in the Lenine Raion, including 45.7% of all Ukrainians living in the district, use the Russian language as their main way of communication. The exact first language composition was as follows:

Native languages in Zavitne
	percent
Russian	77.8%
Ukrainian	12.9%
Crimean Tatar	7.8%
Belarusian	0.4%
Armenian	0.1%
others	1.0%
