= Tobechytske Lake =

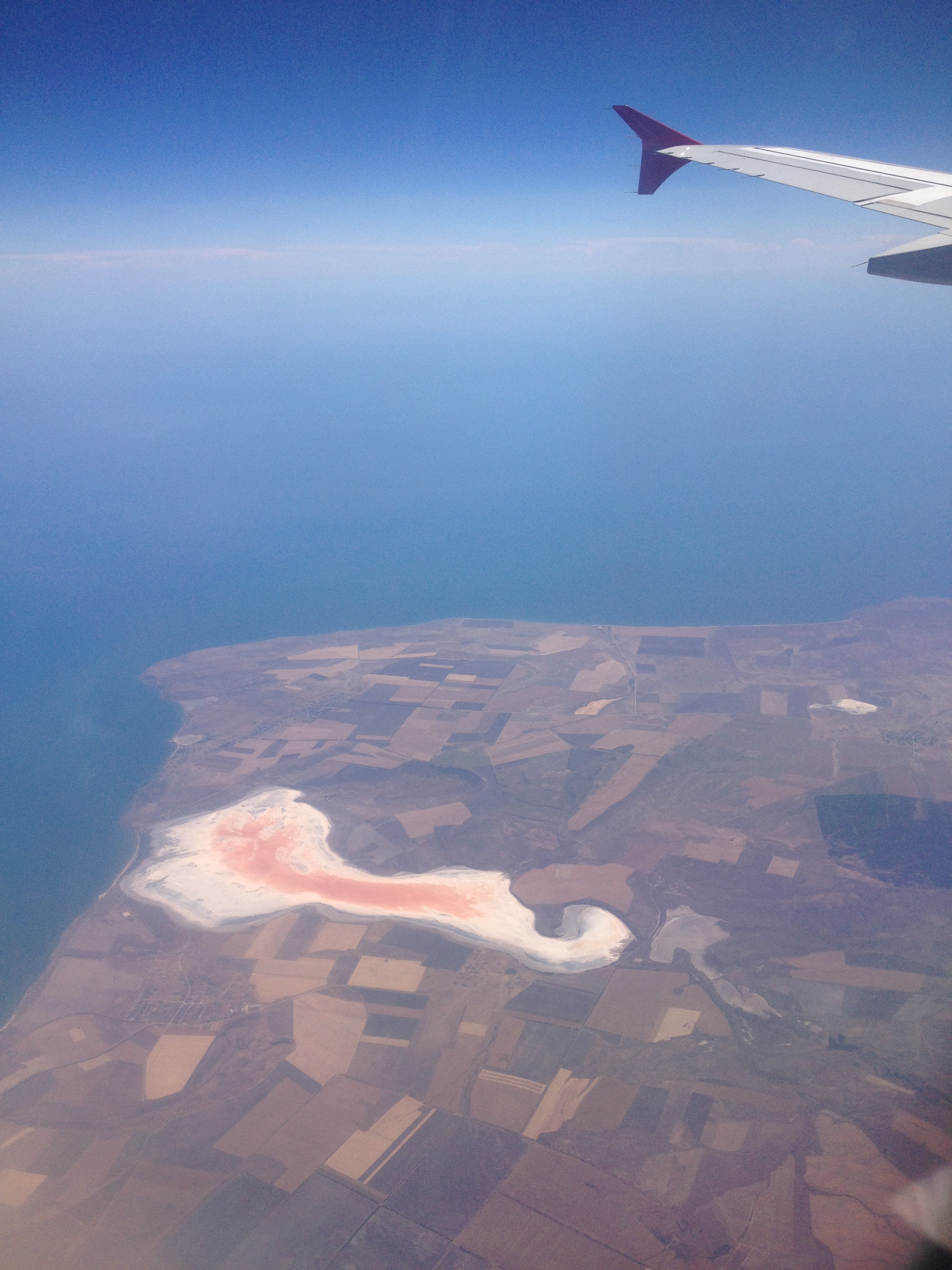
- Aerial view of Tobechytske Lake

- Location within Crimea
- Interactive map of Tobechytske Lake
- Location: Crimea
- Coordinates: 45.171°N 36.371°E
- Type: salt lake

Tobechytske Lake (Russian: Тобечикское озеро; Ukrainian: Тобечикське озеро; Crimean Tatar: Тöbeçik gölü) is a salt lake in the south of the Kerch Peninsula in the Lenine Raion district of Crimea. The lake belongs to the Kerch group of lakes.

The villages of Ohon'ky and Chelyadinove are located to the north of the lake, Kostyrine to the south, and the city of Kerch to the north-east.
