= Lenine, Crimea =

Lenino / Yedi Quyu Lenino / Yedi Quyu (Crimean Tatar) Єди-Кую (Ukrainian) Ленино (Russian)
- Urban-type settlement (de facto) rural settlement (de jure)
- Interactive map of Lenino / Yedi Quyu
- Location of Lenine within Crimea Location of Lenine, Crimea
- Coordinates: 45°17′51″N 35°46′26″E
- Country: Ukraine (de jure); Russia (de facto)
- Republic: AR Crimea (de jure); Republic of Crimea (de facto)
- District: Kerch Raion (de jure); Lenine Raion (de facto)
- Elevation: 30 m (98 ft)

Population (2019)
  - Total: 7,426
- Time zone: UTC+2 (EET)
  - Summer (DST): UTC+3 (EEST)
- Postal code: 298200 — 298203

Lenine (Ukrainian: Ленiне; Russian: Ленино, romanized: Lenino) or Yedy-Kuiu (Ukrainian: Єди-Кую; Russian: Еди-Кую; Crimean Tatar: Yedi Quyu), is a de-facto urban-type settlement in the east of Crimea. It is located in the southwestern portion of the Kerch Peninsula. It is the administrative center of Lenine Raion. The population, according to the 2014 census, is of 7,875.

== History ==
=== Founding and 20th century ===
The settlement originally grew up around a railway station built in 1899. Its original name was Yedi Quyu in the language of the indigenous Crimean Tatars. This name, which means "Seven Wells", was calqued into the Slavic languages used by Crimea's then-rulers in the government of the Russian Empire as Sem Kolodezey (Russian: Семь Колодезей; Ukrainian: Сім Колодязів, romanized: Sim Kolodiaziv). This was the name used in official legal documents. From 1900 onward, it was administratively part of Feodosiysky Uyezd of Taurida Governorate.

During the Russian Civil War that began in 1918, Sem Kolodezey changed hands multiple times. In November 1920, it finally fell into the hands of the Bolsheviks, who established the Soviet Union on much of the territory of the former Russian Empire. In that year, it was incorporated into Kerchensky Uyezd of the Taurida Governorate. In 1921, Kerchensky Uyezd was renamed Kerch Okrug, and made part of the Crimean Autonomous Socialist Soviet Republic within the Russian SFSR. In 1923, Sem Kolodezey was made part of the original Kerch Raion. Kerch Raion was later reorganized as Lenine Raion, and Sem Kolodezey became its administrative center.

The Crimean ASSR was reorganized as the Crimean Oblast, which was transferred to the Ukrainian SSR in 1954. In 1957, Sem Kolodezey received urban-type settlement status, and was renamed Lenine, after Vladimir Lenin. The railway station by the Dzhankoy-Kerch branch located in the settlement is still called Sem Kolodezey.

=== 21st century ===
In March 2014, Russia invaded and annexed the Crimean peninsula from Ukraine. In 2016, as part of decommunization in Ukraine, the Ukrainian government officially restored the settlements indigenous name of Yedi Quyu, as well as renaming Lenine Raion to match. The Russian administration that controls the town and raion continues to use the name Lenine.
