= Uzunlarske Lake =

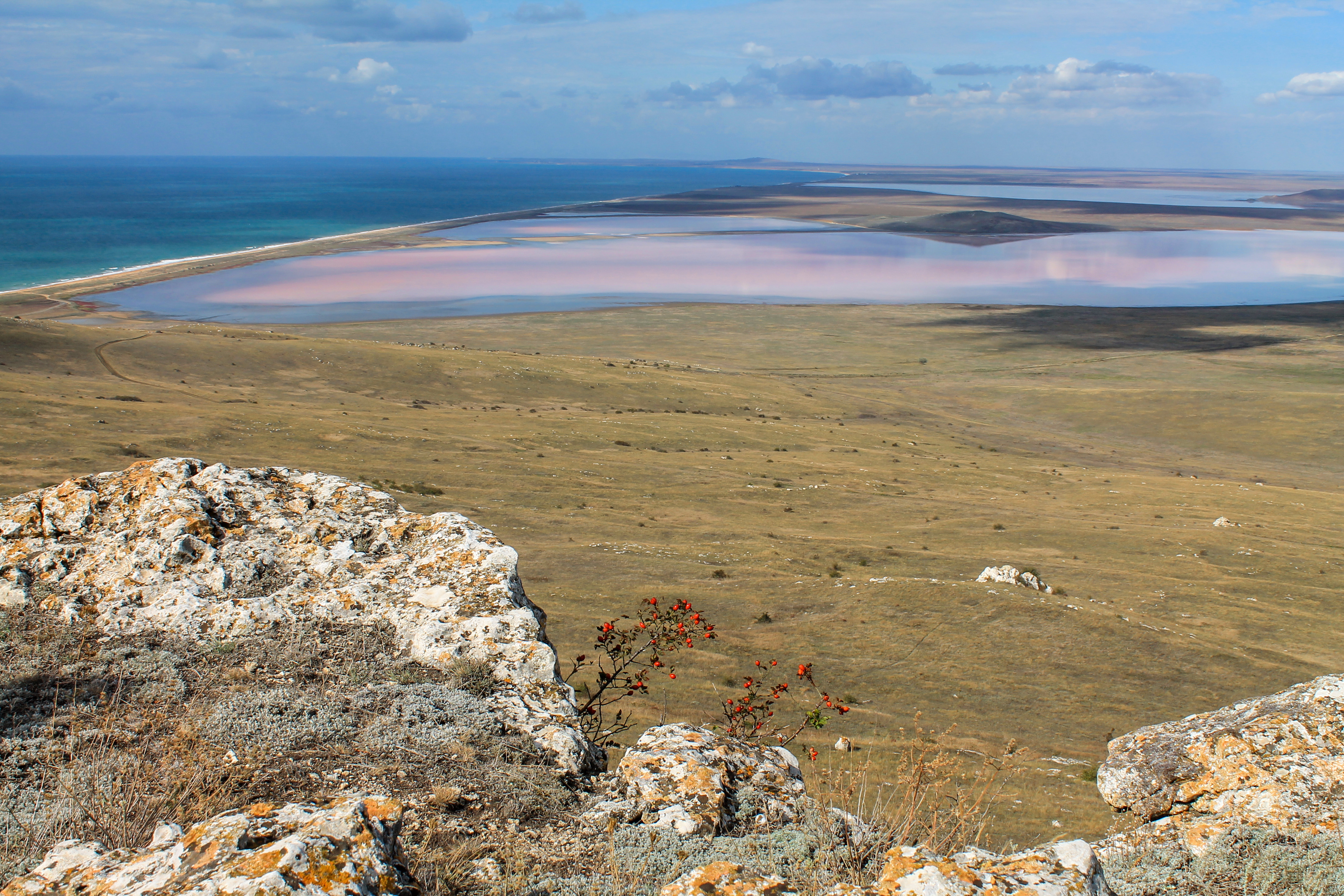
- Aerial view of Uzunlarske Lake

- Location within Crimea
- Location: Crimea
- Coordinates: 45.081°N 36.103°E
- Type: salt lake

Uzunlarske Lake (Russian: Узунларское озеро; Ukrainian: Узунларське озеро; Crimean Tatar: Uzunlar gölü) is a salt lake in the south of the Kerch Peninsula in the Lenine Raion district of Crimea. The lake belongs to the Kerch group of lakes, and is the sixth largest lake in Crimea.

Koyashskoye Salt Lake is located to the east, and the coast of the Black Sea is to the south. Mar'ivka is the closest village to the east.
