= Koyashskoye Salt Lake =

Koyashskoye Koiaske
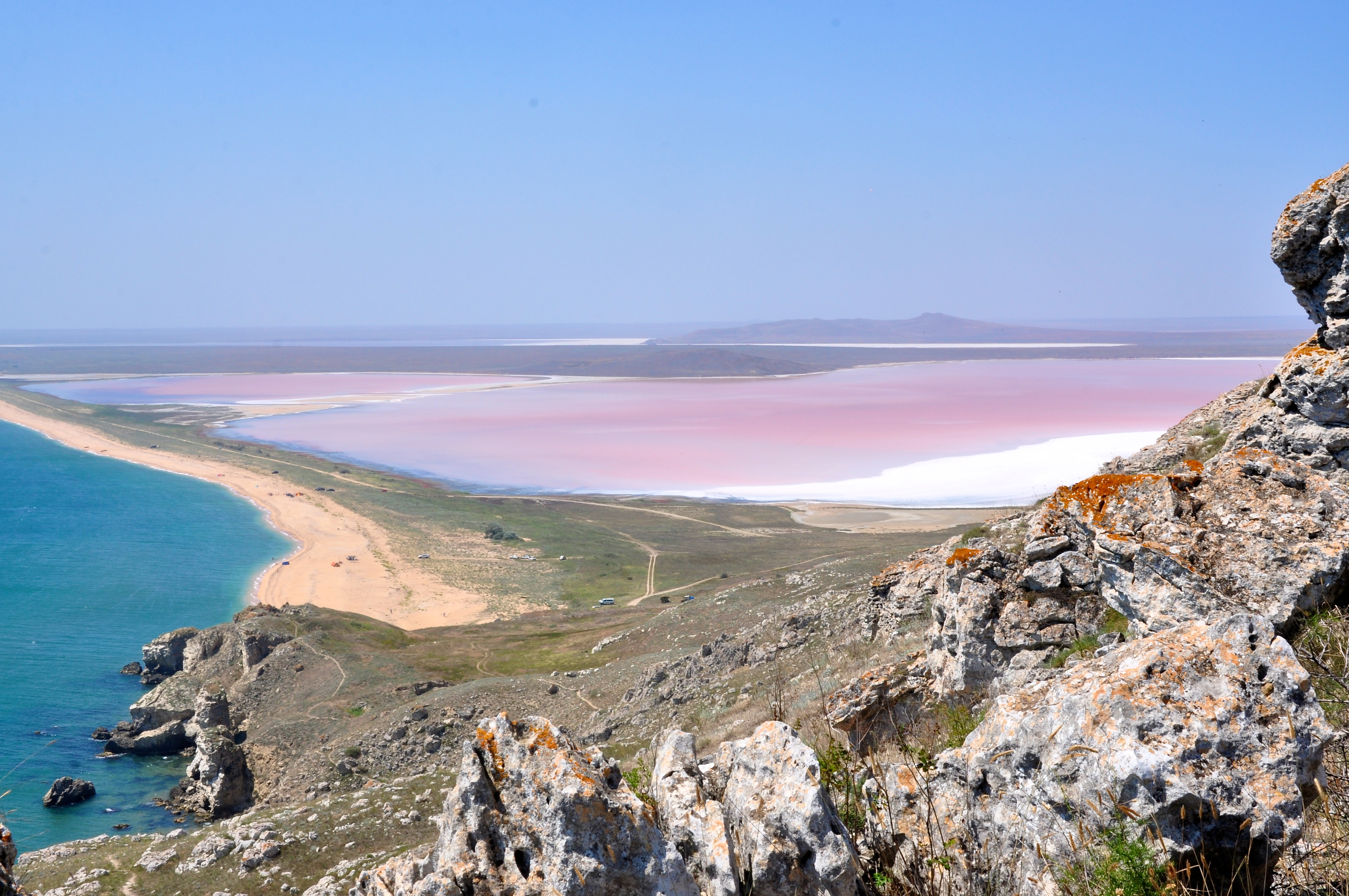
- View of Koyashskoye Salt Lake

- Location within Crimea
- Location: Kerch Peninsula, Crimea, Ukraine
- Coordinates: 45.050°N 36.183°E
- Type: Intermittent Salt lake
- Max. length: 3.89 km (2.42 mi) when full
- Max. width: 2.39 km (1.49 mi) when full
- Average depth: 1 m (3.3 ft)
- Islands: One when lake contains water

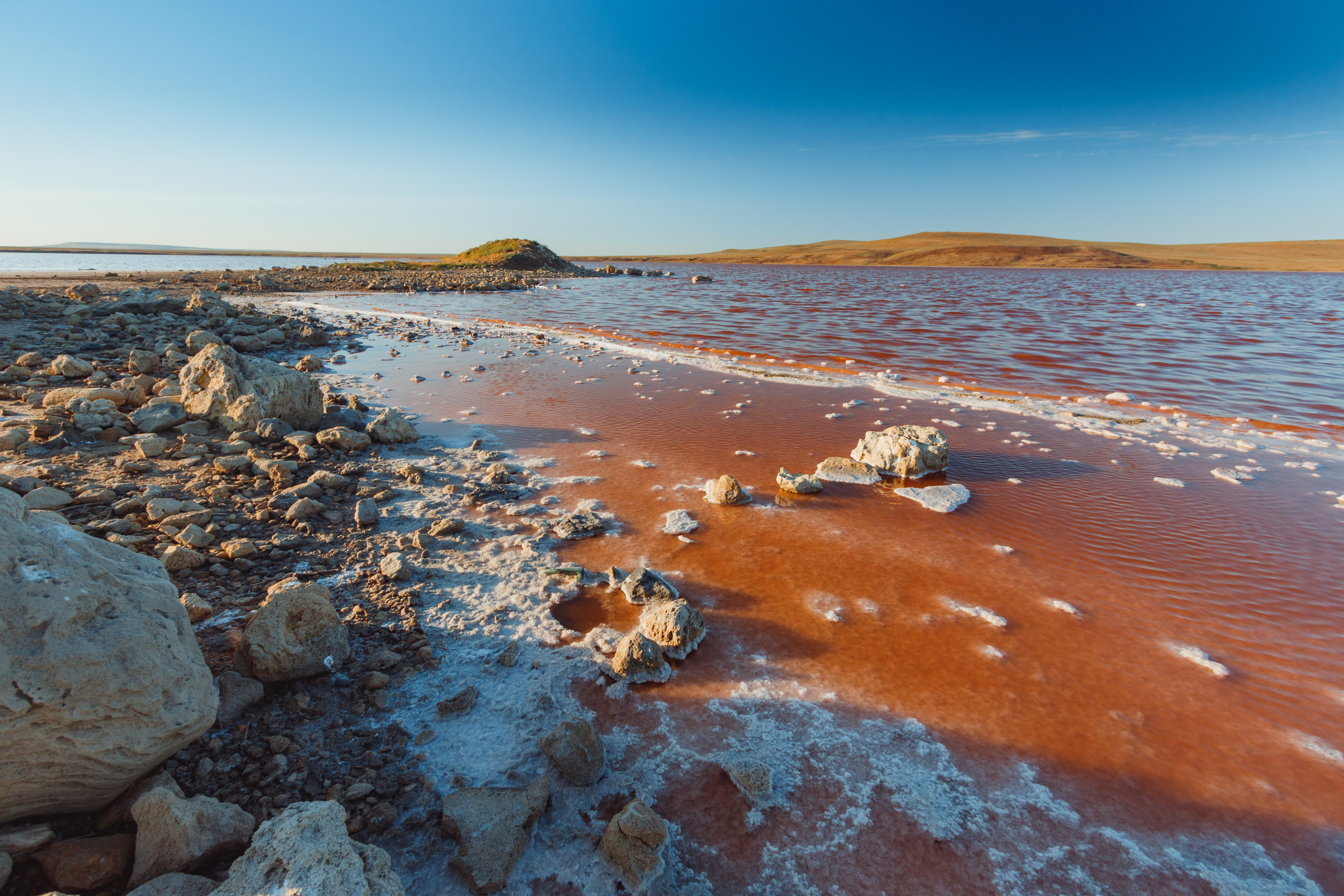
Koyashskoye Salt Lake

Koyashskoye (Russian: Кояшское озеро) or Koiaske (Ukrainian: Кояське озеро) is a salt lake on the coast of the Kerch Peninsula in Crimea, Ukraine, separated from the Black Sea by a strip of land. It is 4 kilometers long, 2 kilometers wide and a meter deep. The lake has the particularity to have a pink to scarlet color, depending on the light, due to the presence of microscopic algae living in the water. When the water evaporates, the salt in the lake crystallizes on the stones and the shores, producing crystal stones and the scent of viola. Uzunlarske Lake is located directly west.

This location is considered healing and is appreciated by some locals. It is not widely known to tourists.
