= Lenine Raion =

Coordinates: 45°17′51″N 35°46′26″E

Lenine Raion Yedi Quyu rayonı
- Raion
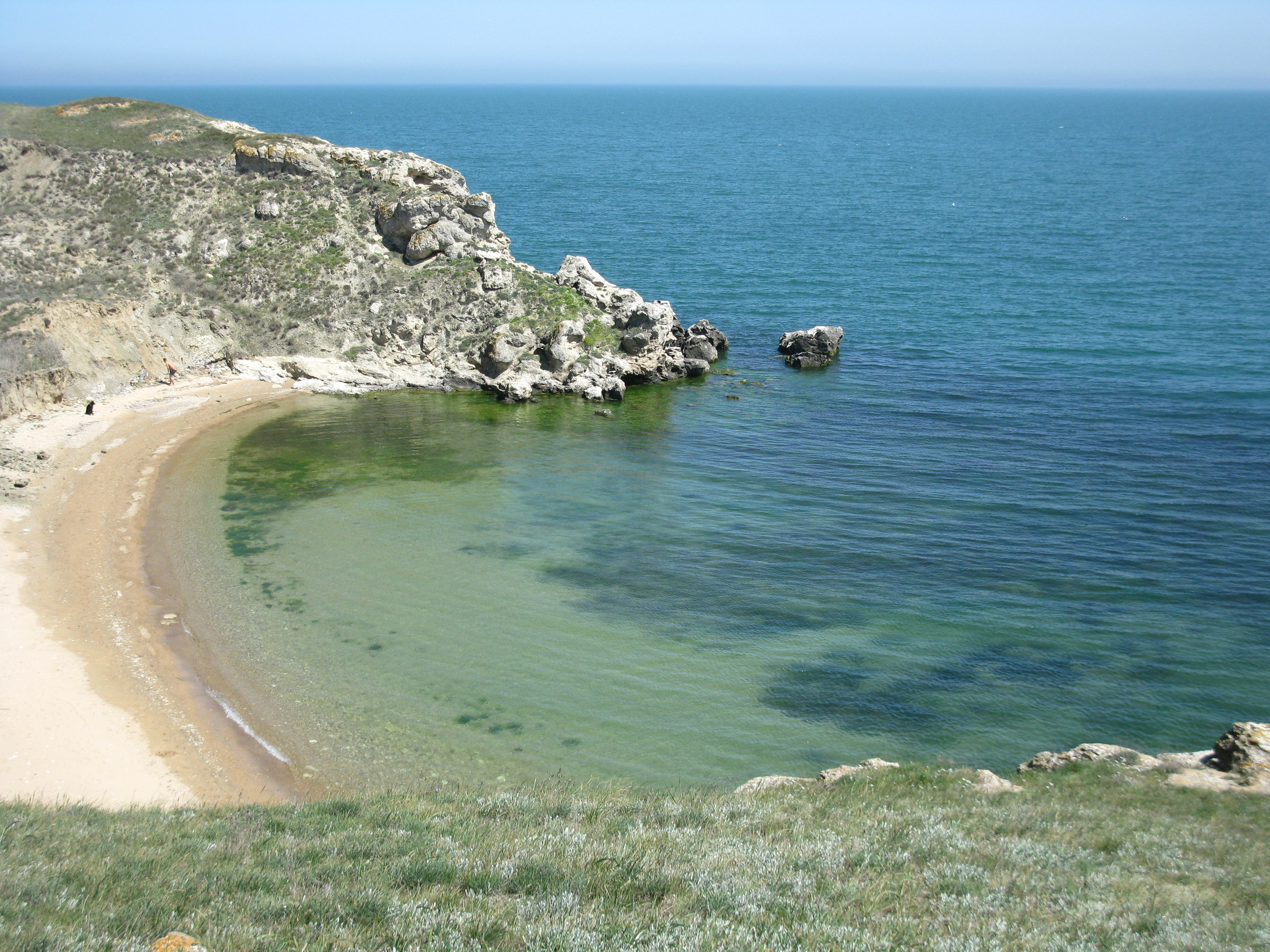
- Kazantyp, Lenine Raion

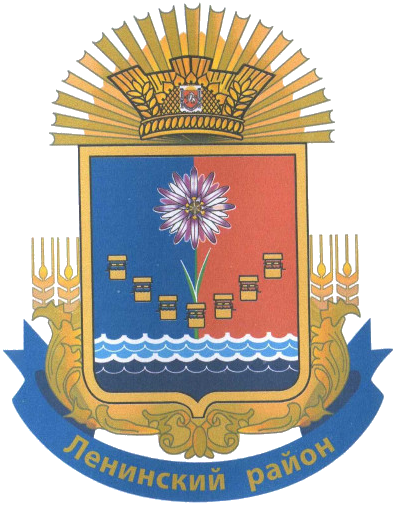
- Flag Seal
- Location within Crimea
- Country: Ukraine (occupied by Russia)
- Republic: Crimea
- Established: January 1921
- Disestablished by Ukraine: July 2020
- Capital: Lenine
- Subdivisions: List: 1 cities; 2 towns; 67 villages

Area
  - Total: 2,919 km^{2} (1,127 sq mi)

Population (2014)
  - Total: 61,143
  - Density: 20.95/km^{2} (54.25/sq mi)
- Time zone: UTC+2 (EET)
  - Summer (DST): UTC+3 (EEST)
- Dialing code: +380-6557

Lenine Raion (Ukrainian: Ленінський район, Russian: Ленинский район) or Yedy-Kuiu Raion (Ukrainian: Єдикуйський район, romanized: Yedykuiskyi raion, Crimean Tatar: Yedi Quyu rayonı) was one of the twenty-five districts of the Autonomous Republic of Crimea in Ukraine until its abolition in 2020. It continues to be used by the Russian administration known as the Republic of Crimea, as Russia has occupied Crimea since 2014.

The administrative centre of Lenine Raion is the urban-type settlement of Lenine, which is also known as Yedy-Kuiu. Population: 61,143 (2014 Census).

== Geography ==
It is located in the eastern part of the peninsula. Populated places in the raion include: Shcholkine, Cheliadinove, Ohonky, Kostyrine, Naberezhne, Frontove, Yehorove, and Zavitne.

== History ==
=== 20th century ===
The raion was formed in January 1921 as Petrovsky Raion. In July the same year, it was renamed Kerch Raion, with its center in Kerch. In October 1921, it was reorganized into Kerch Okrug of the Crimean Autonomous Socialist Soviet Republic. It took on several forms throughout the following decade, eventually stably ending up as Lenine Raion, with its center in Lenine. In 1939, 12,945 people lived in Lenine Raion, and 17,599 people lived in Mayak-Salyn Raion, which would later become part of Lenine Raion. Both raions had multi-ethnic populations.

In 1941, the Soviet authorities deported all ethnic Germans from both Lenine Raion and Mayak-Salyn Raion. During World War II, the raion was occupied two times by Nazi Germany: first in November–December 1941 and second in May 1942–April 1944. The Nazis committed atrocities and human rights abuses against prisoners of war and the civilian population during this time. By the end of the fighting in Crimea, the populations of Lenine and Mayak-Salyn Raions had dropped to 12,945 and 17,599 people, respectively.

In May 1944, the Crimean Tatars - the indigenous peoples of the peninsula - were deported from Crimea by the Soviet authorities in a campaign of ethnic cleansing. In June the same year, other ethnicities were deported as well. Localities with indigenous Crimean Tatar names were renamed, to remove traces of the original inhabitants. In 1945, the Crimean ASSR was transformed into the Crimean Oblast of the Russian SFSR.

In 1954, the Crimean Oblast was internally transferred to the Ukrainian SSR. In 1962, Mayak-Salyn Raion was merged into Lenine Raion. In 1991, Ukraine became independent from the Soviet Union, causing a dispute over the status of Crimea within Ukraine. Lenine Raion became part of an interim polity known as the Republic of Crimea, as specifics were worked out. Eventually, the legal status was resolved, and Lenine Raion became part of the Autonomous Republic of Crimea within Ukraine in 1998.

=== 21st century ===
In March 2014, Russia unilaterally and illegally annexed Crimea from Ukraine, and began using Lenine Raion as a subdivision of its self-proclaimed Republic of Crimea.

In 2016, Lenine Raion was renamed to Yedy Kuiu Raion by the Ukrainian government, in parallel with the renaming of Lenine to Yedy Kuiu. Yedy Kuiu, or in the Crimean Tatar language, Yedi Quyu, is the original native name of the town in the language of its indigenous population, the Crimean Tatars. Several other localities in the raion were also officially renamed to their indigenous names in the same reforms. However, the Russian occupation administration continues to use the communist names imposed in Soviet times.

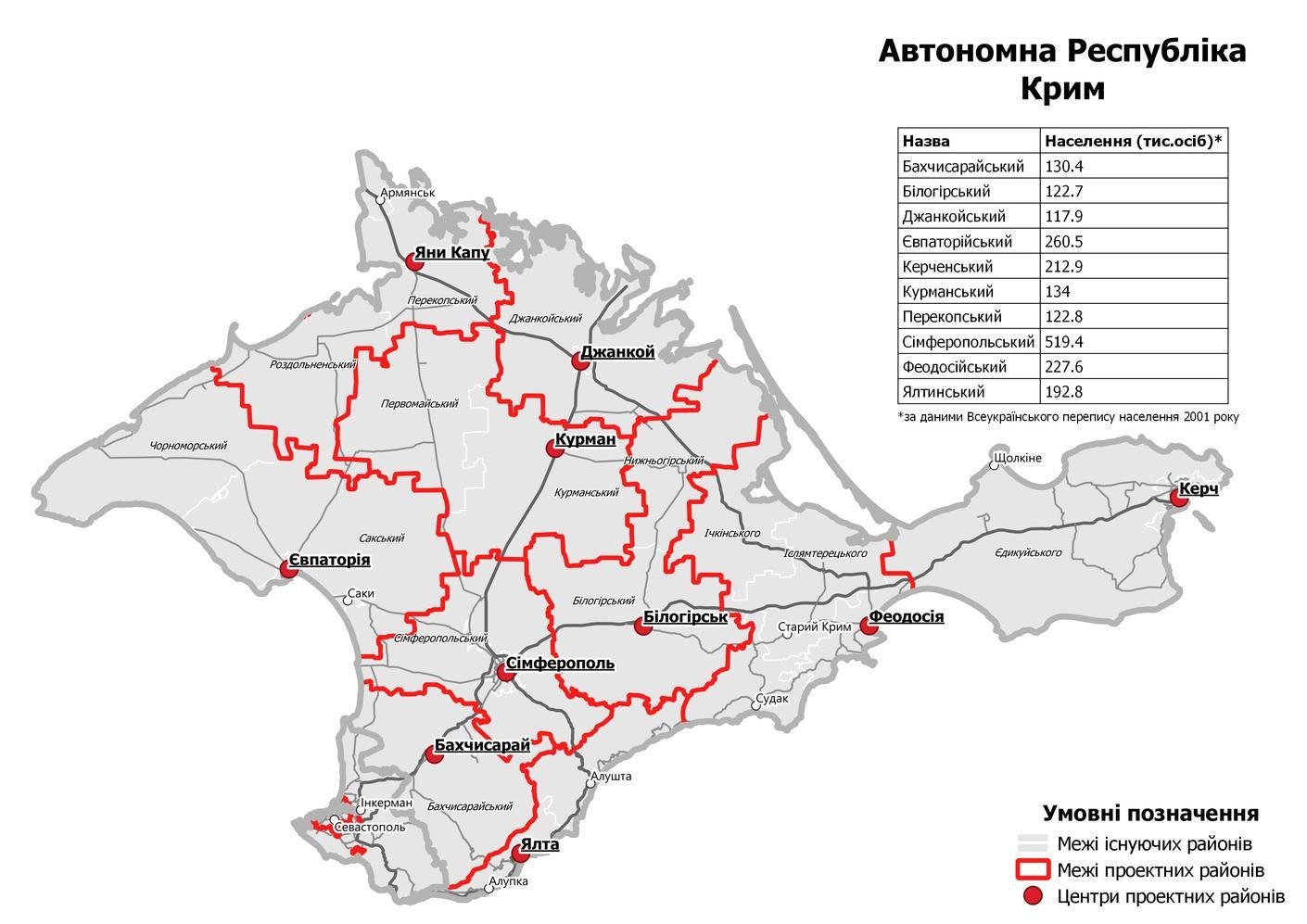
In July 2020, the Verkhovna Rada approved an administrative reform in Crimea

In July 2020, Ukraine conducted an administrative reform throughout its de jure territory. This included Crimea. Among other changes, Yedi Kuiu Raion was abolished, and its territories merged into Kerch Raion; though, this has not yet been implemented due to the ongoing Russian occupation.

== Demographics ==
As of the 2001 Ukrainian census, the raion had a population of 69,653 people. It had a slim majority of ethnic Russians (54.8%), with significant minorities of Ukrainians (22.9%), Crimean Tatars (15.5%), and Belarusians (1.3%). There were also small minorities of Armenians, Moldovans, Uzbeks, Greeks, and Germans.

As of 2014, the raion had a population of 61,143 people. The population of the district speaks 86% Russian, 9% Ukrainian, and 5% other languages.
