= Kerch Peninsula =

Eastern portion of Crimea

- Peninsula
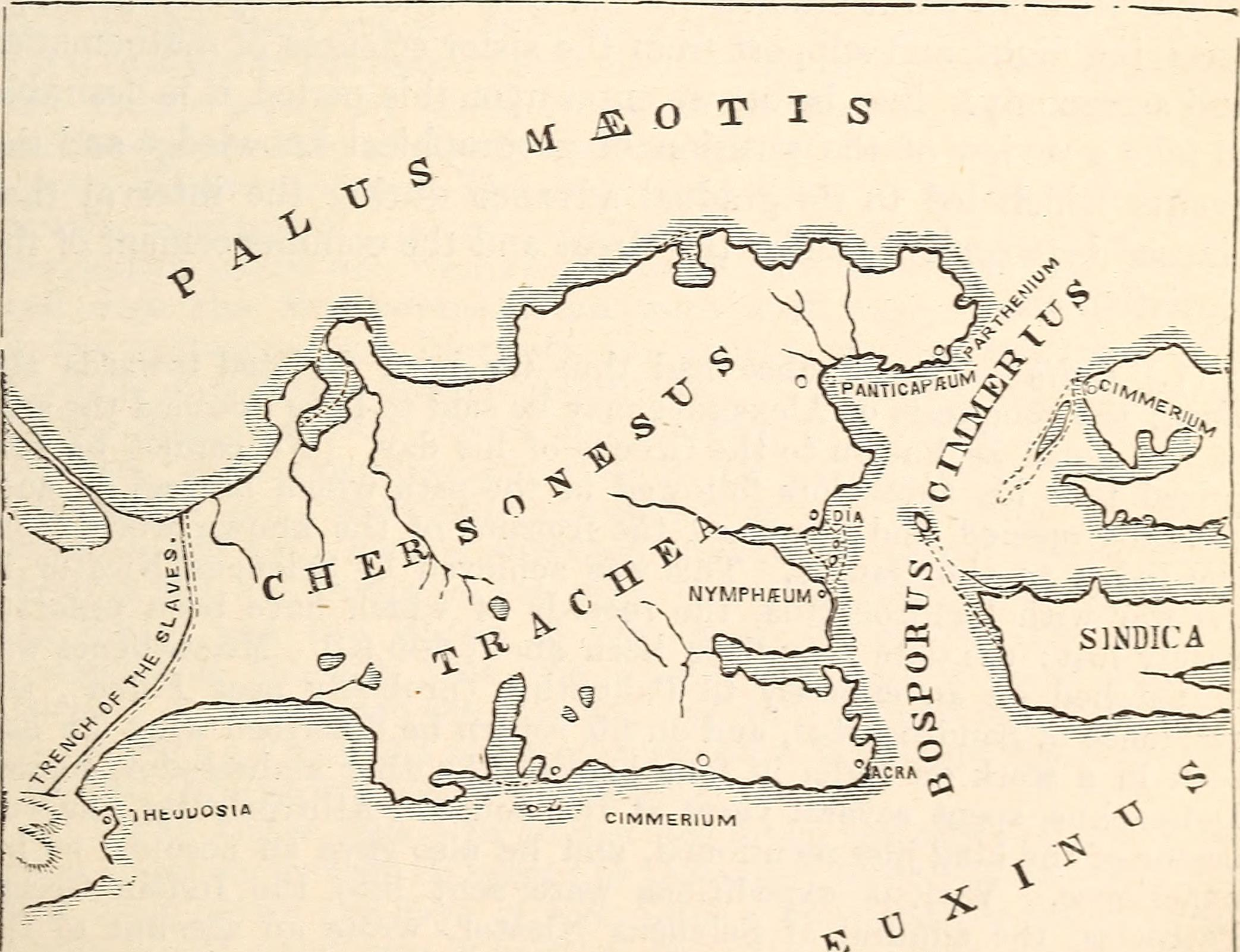
- Map of Kerch Peninsula in antiquity.

- Location within Crimea
- Interactive map of Kerch Peninsula
- Coordinates: 45°15′N 36°00′E
- Location: Crimea
- Part of: Crimea

The Kerch Peninsula is a major and prominent geographic peninsula located at the eastern end of the Crimean Peninsula. This peninsula stretches eastward toward the Taman Peninsula between the Sea of Azov and the Black Sea. Most of the peninsula is located within the Lenine Raion.

== Names ==
In Classical Antiquity, the area was known as the "Rough Peninsula" (Greek: Χερσόνησος Τραχεία, Latin: Chersonesus Trachea).

In Slavic languages, its pronunciation does not vary by much: Ukrainian: Керченський півострів, Kerchenskyi Pivostriv; Crimean Tatar: Keriç yarımadası, Kerich Yarymadasy; Russian: Керченский полуостров, Kyerchyenskii Polu'ostrov.

== Geography ==
The Kerch Peninsula is almost completely surrounded by water and only to the west connects with the rest of Crimea by the Isthmus of Ak-Monay which is only 17 kilometres (11 miles) wide (from the southern end of the Arabat Spit to the town of Primorsky (Khafuz), Feodosiya). On elevated portions of the isthmus, named after the village of Kamianske (former Aq-Monai), are seen both of the surrounding seas.

The widest portion of the Kerch Peninsula is between the Kazan-Tip Cape (north) and Chauda Cape (south), that are 52 kilometres (32 miles) apart. The length of Kerch Peninsula is over 90 kilometres (56 miles), from the western portion of Aqmanai Isthmus to the Fonar Cape. The total area of the peninsula is 2,830 square kilometres (700,000 acres), which is just over 10% of the total area of the Crimean peninsula.

The southern coast of the Kerch peninsula is washed by the Black Sea and the Bay of Feodosia, to the east as a natural border serves the Strait of Kerch, while the northern shores are part of the coastline of the Sea of Azov, Kazantip Bay, and Bay of Arabat. Away to the northwest from the peninsula runs another isthmus known as the Arabat Spit (locally Arabat arrow) which separates Sivash (the Rotten Sea) from Azov Sea. Other prominent features of the peninsula are Mount Mithridat located in the east at the shores of the Strait of Kerch and the Ararat Mountain (175 metres (574 ft)) located just west of the Kerch city, both of which are part of the northeastern elevated region. At the southeastern portion of peninsula are located mountains Sosman and Kharuchu-Oba. The highest mountain on the peninsula is Pikhbopai that is part of the Mithridat crest and 189 metres (620 ft) tall. The Kerch Peninsula, as well as surrounding areas such as Azerbaijan, Iran, Russia, and the Caspian Sea region (which encompasses the Caucasus and Central Asia) are home to many mud volcanoes. These mud volcanoes are important for the region's oil industry.

=== Capes ===
Black Sea

- Chauda
- Opuk
- Takhil

Sea of Azov

- Malyi
- Fonar
- Khroni
- Zyuk
- Chahany
- Kazan-Tip
- Kiten
- Krasny Kut

=== Lakes, rivers, bays ===
Beside the above-mentioned bays there are also Mysova bay and Tatarska bay, both located around the Kazan-Tip Cape making it look as a small peninsula.

- Uzunlarske Lake
- Kachyk lake
- Koyashskoye Salt Lake
- Tobechytske Lake
- Aqtas Lake

=== Nature preserves ===
On the territory of the peninsula are located several natural preserves (zapovedniks):

- Opuksky Nature Reserve, the only place in Ukraine where rosy starlings nest
- Kazan-Tip Natural Preserve
- Ostanine floodplains, a state zakaznik near settlement Ostanine

== Historical sites ==
- Turkish wall, a defensive wall that stretches across the peninsula from Bay of Kazan-Tip to the lake of Koyashs'ke

== See also ==
- Battle of the Kerch Peninsula — an offensive by the Axis powers against Soviet troops in World War II
- List of peninsulas
- Myrmekion
- Panticapaeum
- Siberia Airlines Flight 1812
- Opuk (mountain)
