= Destruction of the Kakhovka Dam =

2023 dam breach in Ukraine

- Part of the Dnieper campaign of the Russian invasion of Ukraine
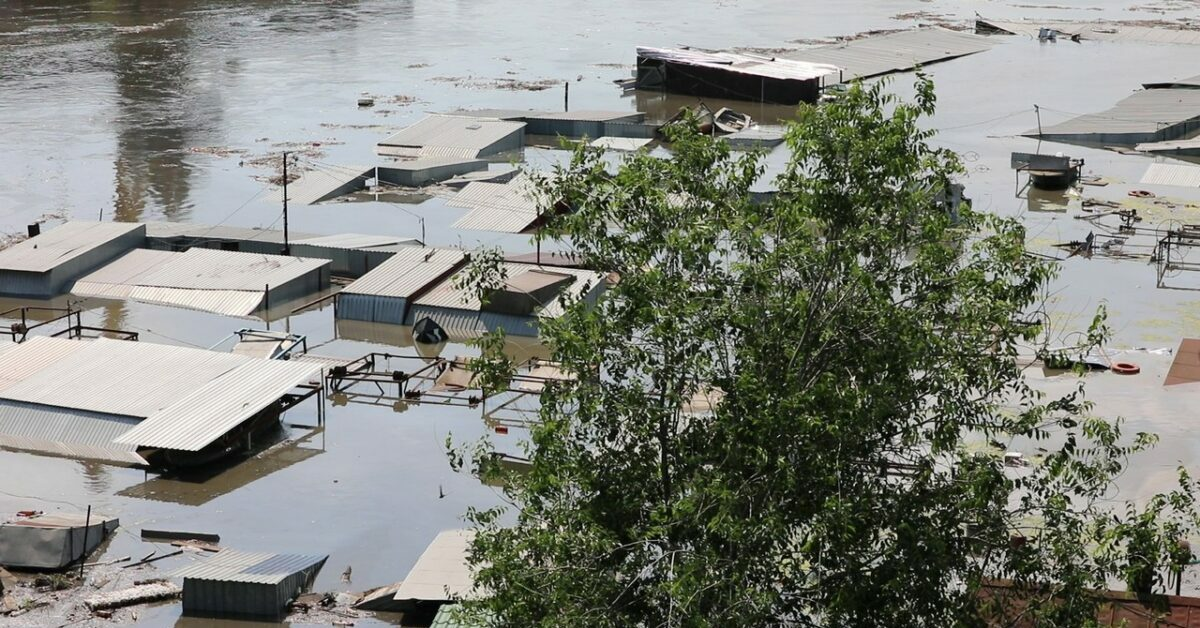
- Flooding downstream from the dam
- Location: 46°46′40″N 33°22′13″E; Kakhovka Hydroelectric Power Plant, Kherson Oblast, Ukraine
- Date: 6 June 2023 between 02:00 and 02:54 (UTC+3)
- Attack type: Dam breaching
- Weapon: Unknown
- Deaths: 59 reported by Russian authorities Between 200 and 300 in Oleshky according to local health workers
- Perpetrators: Russia (Note: See § Responsibility for more details.); 205th Separate Guards Motor Rifle Brigade (per Ukraine)

The Kakhovka Dam was breached in the early hours of 6 June 2023, causing extensive flooding along the lower Dnieper river, also called the Dnipro, in Kherson Oblast. The dam was under the control of the Russian military, which had seized it in the early days of the Russian invasion of Ukraine. Many experts concluded that Russian forces likely blew up a segment of the dam to hinder the planned Ukrainian counter-offensive, and Ukraine specifically blamed Russia's 205th Separate Guards Motor Rifle Brigade. Russian authorities have denied the accusations.

The dam was about 30 m (98 ft) tall and 3.2 km (2 mi) long; the breached segment was about 85 m (279 ft) long. Two days after the breach, the average level of flooding in the Kherson Oblast was 5.61 m (18.4 ft), according to local officials.

There were signs of an explosion at the time of the breach. Both Ukrainian and Russian sources reported hearing blasts from the dam's hydroelectric power station, regional seismometers detected explosions in the area, and a satellite detected the infrared heat signature of an explosion.

Water levels in the Kakhovka Reservoir, controlled by Russia, had been rising for months and were at a 30-year high when the dam failed. Thousands of residents downstream were evacuated, and floods submerged several villages in Ukrainian- and Russian-controlled areas. By 21 June, 58 people were reported to have been killed and 31 were missing. Russian authorities officially report that 59 people drowned in total, but local health workers and a volunteer grave digger from Oleshky have told the Associated Press that the death toll was in the hundreds from that city alone, with shallow mass graves dug for the victims. According to the informants, reporting of deaths in Oleshky was hampered by interference from police beginning June 12, by relocation of bodies and by extortion of families of survivors and coercion of health care workers to misreport causes of death on death certificates, which could not be written in Ukrainian language in Russian-occupied territory or conveyed to Ukrainian authorities. Flooding killed many animals and damaged farmland, homes, businesses, and infrastructure. The loss of water from the reservoir could threaten the long-term water supply to Russian-controlled Crimea and the Zaporizhzhia Nuclear Power Plant, but there was no immediate risk to either.

== Background ==
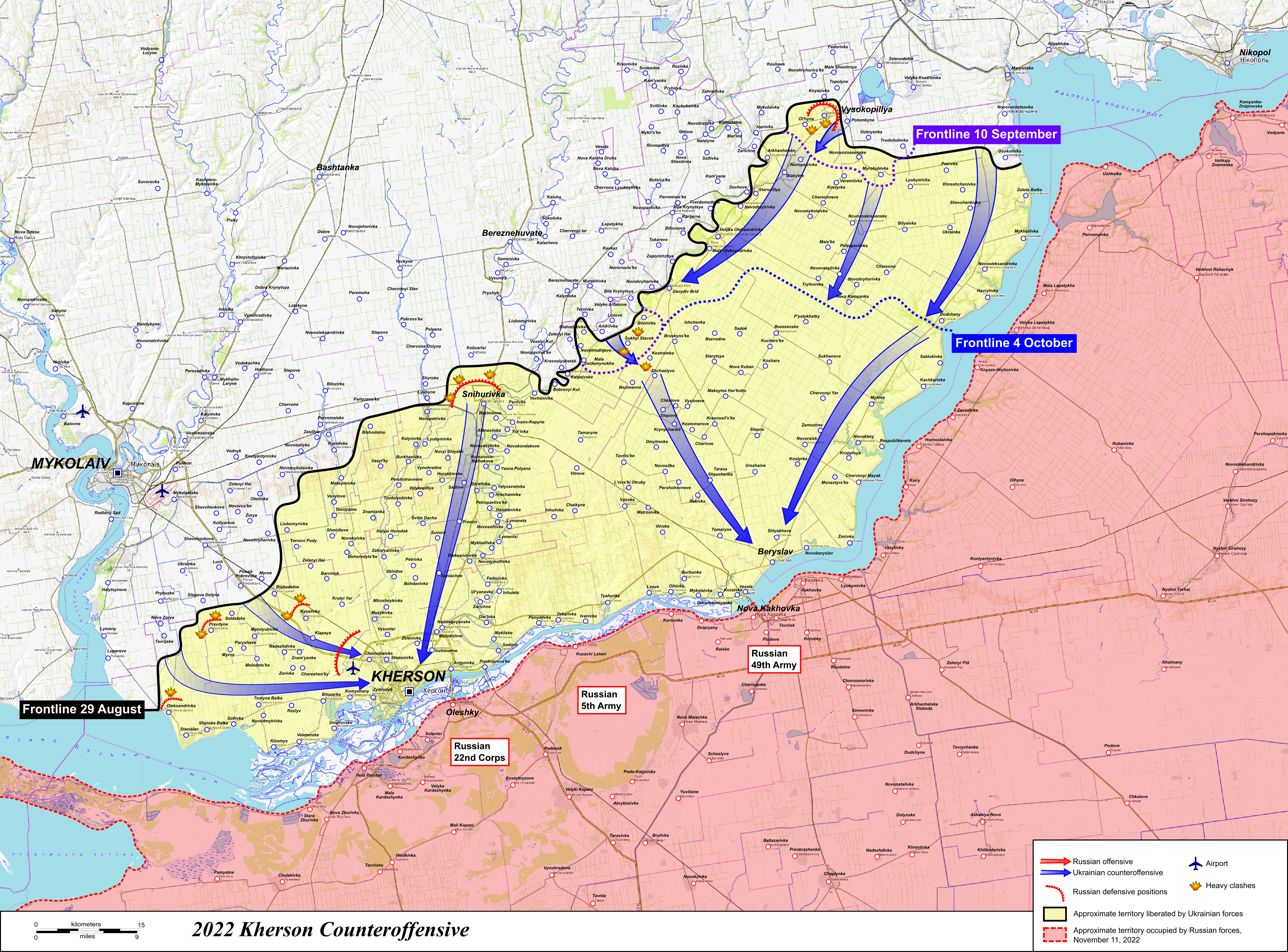
Land retaken by Ukraine (yellow) and land occupied by Russia (red). As of 6 June 2023, the Dnieper River was the frontline.

The Kakhovka Dam raised the natural level of the Dnieper River by 16 m (52 ft), flooding the Great Meadow and creating the Kakhovka Reservoir. This was the second-largest reservoir in Ukraine by area (2,155 km^{2} [832 sq mi]) and the largest by water volume (18.19 km^{3} [4.36 cu mi]).

Another dam on the Dnieper was breached twice during World War II in Ukraine. In August 1941, the Soviet NKVD blew up the Dnieper dam to hinder the Nazi German advance, killing between 3,000 and 100,000 Soviet civilians, as well as Soviet troops. In 1943, it was blown up again, this time by retreating German troops.

The Kakhovka dam was built in 1956 and was seized by Russian forces in February 2022, during the early days of the Russian invasion of Ukraine. Russia attacked Ukrainian infrastructure that year, damaging several other dams and leaving Ukrainians without access to water. Examples include rocket attack against Kyiv dam on 26 February 2022, the destruction of the Oskil Dam by Russian land forces in July and the missile attack on the Kryvyi Rih dam that September.

According to Ukrainian military intelligence, Russian forces carried out "major mining" of the Kakhovka dam shortly after taking control in February 2022, and in April 2022 mined locks and supports and installed "tented trucks with explosives [on] the dam itself". In October 2022, the Foreign Minister of Moldova, Nicu Popescu, said that Ukraine had intercepted Russian missiles targeting a different dam, on the Dniester river. At the time, Ukrainian president Zelenskyy warned of Russian preparations to destroy the Kakhovka dam and blame Ukraine, and called for an international observation mission at the dam to prevent a potential catastrophe.

On 19 October 2022, the Institute for the Study of War (ISW) reported that Russia was likely setting information conditions to conduct a false-flag attack on the Kakhovka Dam. The Russian military announced that they had received information that Ukraine intended to strike the dam. According to ISW analysis, they likely intended these warnings to set information conditions for Russian forces to damage the dam and then to blame Ukraine, while using the floods to cover their own retreat.

In late 2022, Ukraine retook the western bank of the Dnieper during the Kherson counteroffensive. Ukraine accused Russia of planning to breach the Kakhovka dam with explosives in retaliation. During the counteroffensive, Ukrainian Major General Andriy Kovalchuk at one point considered flooding the Dnieper River below the dam, so Ukrainian forces conducted HIMARS test strikes on the Kakhovka dam. One strike targeted one of the dam's floodgates to determine if the rocket could open it. The test was deemed a success and the action was kept as a "last resort" in case of a Russian offensive.

When Russian forces retreated from Kherson in November 2022 they destroyed the bridge deck behind them, damaging some of the sluice gates in a controlled demolition.

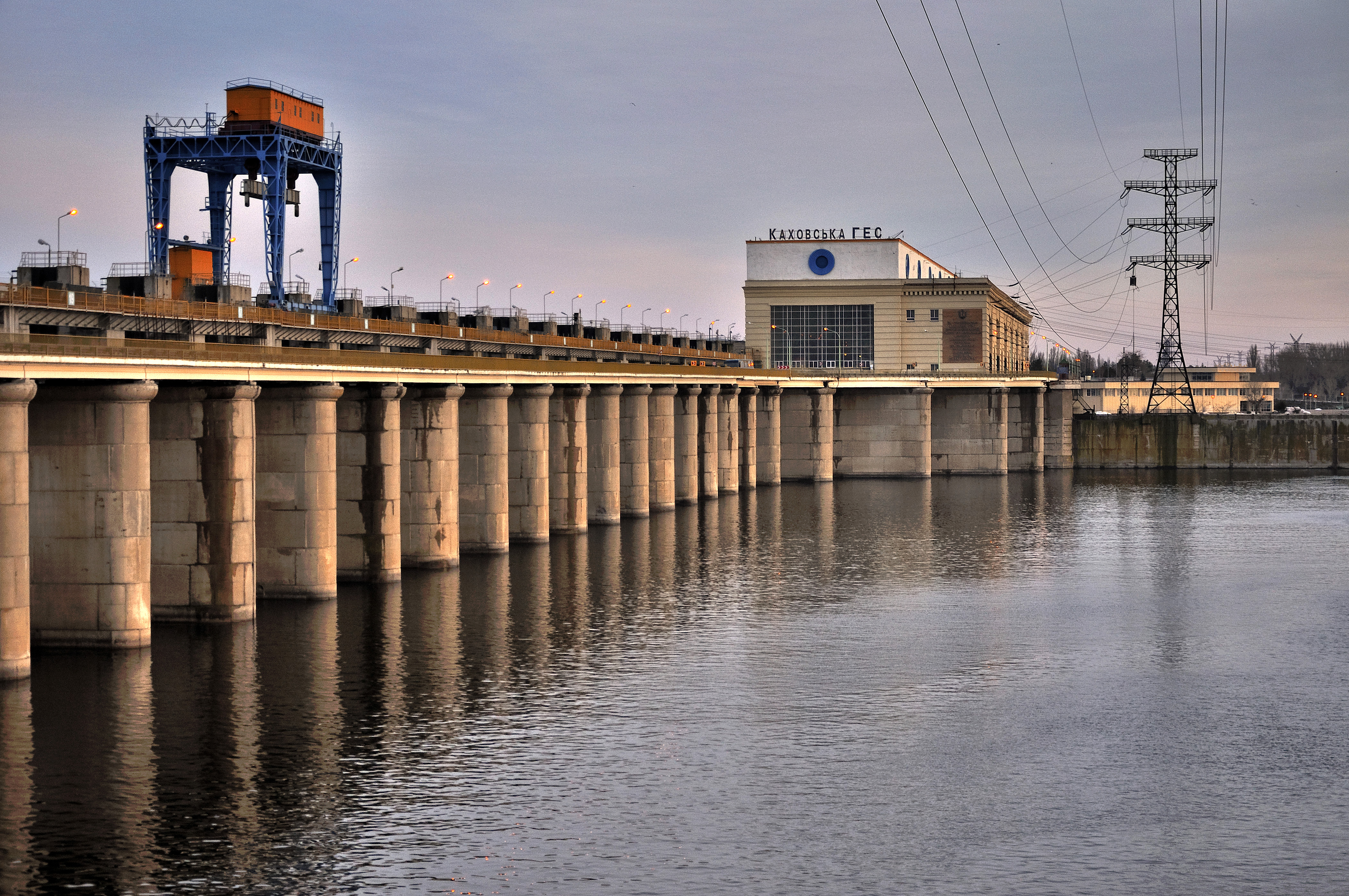
The part of the dam near the power station turbine hall that showed damage a few days before the breach, as seen in 2013

The Russians then opened more sluice gates, allowing water to rush out of the reservoir. Ukraine's Zaporizhzhia Regional Military Administration suggested that Russia intended to flood the area south of the dam, to keep Ukrainian forces from crossing the Dnieper River. Ukrhydroenergo, Ukraine's hydro electric company, likewise believed Russian occupiers "opened the station's locks fearing an advance of Ukrainian soldiers". Spring 2023 brought an unusually large amount of rain, with 3.5 times the normal amount of rainfall recorded in April.

On 3–6 May, satellite photos indicated that Russian forces were building a small dam on Tokmachka river, which caused flooding upstream in the path of an expected Ukrainian offensive. Some called this part of a Russian pattern of using flooding to thwart the Ukrainian counteroffensive.

From mid-February to late May 2023, either deliberately or as a result of neglect, the damaged dam was not adjusted to match the increased water flow. As a result, water washed over the top of the dam and land upstream of the dam was flooded. Water levels in the reservoir reached a 30-year high. According to journalist Peter Beaumont, it is possible that Russia had deliberately allowed water levels to rise to an extraordinary level in order to make the collapse more impactful.

A small part of a wall separating the dam and the power plant collapsed on 23 April (44 days before the dam failed).

On 28 May an aerial photo was taken of a car that appeared to be loaded with explosives, in the form of large barrels and a land mine, parked on the top of the dam. According to a Ukrainian special forces communications official, the purpose of the car was both to stop any Ukrainian attack on the dam and to amplify the explosion that the Russians planned to originate in the machine room, which was located in a building to one side of the dam. Early drone footage suggests that the initial dam destruction occurred near the machine room.

On 30 May 2023, less than a week before the dam breach, the Russian government decreed that in occupied Ukraine, "Until 1 January 2028, technical investigations shall not be carried out into accidents at hazardous production facilities and accidents at hydraulic structures that occurred as a result of military operations, sabotage and acts of terrorism." Oleg Ustenko, an economic adviser to Ukrainian President Volodymyr Zelenskyy, called this a "smoking gun", saying that it would take somebody with a "very vivid imagination" to believe that the passing of this legislation less than a week prior to the destruction of the Kakhovka hydroelectric power station, covering precisely the circumstances that would transpire, was just a coincidence.

On 2 June, a small part of the road over the dam collapsed, along with parts of the piers which supported them, according to satellite images obtained by BBC News. According to NPR science correspondent Geoff Brumfiel, "That indicates to me that there were structural issues at the facility before whatever happened today."

The Institute for the Study of War reported on June 6, the day the dam was destroyed, that "Russian sources have expressed intense and explicit concern over the possibility that Ukraine has been preparing to cross the river and counterattack into east bank Kherson Oblast."

== Destruction ==
Before and after the destruction

Between 2:18 and 2:20 a.m. local time on 6 June 2023, Ukrainian and Russian sources reported loud sounds like explosions that appeared to come from the Kakhovka Hydroelectric Power Plant in the dam. Nova Kakhovka residents discussed the explosions on a Telegram channel with 5,000 members, with one resident describing (in Ukrainian) "orange flares" and saying that the water was "very noisy ... very loud" at 2:45. Ukrainian president Volodymyr Zelenskyy said there was an "internal explosion" at 2:50 [a.m.]. According to The Economist, the explosions were so strong that they rattled windows 80 km (50 mi) from the dam.

Regional seismometers in Romania and Ukraine that were 600 and 500 km (370 and 310 mi) away detected signals that Norwegian Seismic Array (NORSAR) scientists interpreted as a weak seismic event in the area of the dam at 2:35 a.m. Ukrainian summer time, and a stronger, possibly magnitude 1 to 2 signal representing an explosion occurring at 2:54 a.m. (seismic waves, which travel at 6 km/sec in surface rock, would take approximately 83 and 100 seconds to travel 500 and 600 km, respectively).

NORSAR department head Ben Dando said the characteristics of the 2:54 signal corresponded well to those of an explosion but he said there was "too much uncertainty" on the magnitude, meaning that the power was equally uncertain. Officially collected data was not clear enough to establish whether there were one or two explosions, or even whether the signal of 2:35 a.m. represented an explosion. NORSAR CEO Anne Lycke said it was clear that the signal heard at 2:54 represented a man-made event, but it remains uncertain whether that signal was what caused the dam to collapse.

An infrared heat signature, consistent with that of a major explosion, was detected at the dam by United States spy satellites shortly before it collapsed.

Experts consulted by The New York Times (NYT) said on 7 June that the most likely cause was a blast from inside, adding that an attack from outside or a structural failure were less plausible. They said that blasts from outside—such as from a missile or artillery strike—would exert only a fraction of the force needed, and would also have accuracy limitations.

Ihor Syrota, the director general of the Ukrainian hydroelectric power company Ukrhydroenergo, rejected the possibility of shelling or catastrophic structural failure as Russian propaganda. Syrota stated that "the plant was designed to withstand a nuclear strike. To destroy the plant from the outside, at least three aircraft bombs, each of 500 kg, would have had to [have been] dropped on the same spot. The station was blown up from the inside".

Kakhovka Dam cross-section scheme with the inspection tunnel marked in red

Christopher Binnie, a water engineer specializing in dams and water resources development, and visiting professor at the University of Exeter, said the fact that there were "two breaches, either side of a structure", indicates that natural causes are highly unlikely. "Were the breach to be caused by excess upstream water level there would only be one". He also said it was highly unlikely the dam was breached by Ukrainian shelling, because to destroy the dam they "would need to get massive explosives close to the foundations".

The New York Times published another examination of the reason for the dam failure on 16 June. They consulted with Ihor Strelets, an engineer who spent months at the dam and served as the deputy head of water resources for the Dnieper from 2005 until 2018, who said the dam's huge bulk was mostly hidden below the waterline. A colossal block of nearly-solid concrete, 20 m (66 ft) high and up to 40 m (130 ft) thick at the bottom, held back the water. It also meant the Cold War-era dam could withstand almost any attack from outside. The sluice gates sat on top of this concrete, opening and shutting to adjust the water level in the reservoir. It became clear after the breach that not only the gates but also the concrete foundation had been destroyed. There had been earlier damage to the roadway over the dam and to some of the sluice gates (Ukrainian missiles had done some of this, as had retreating Russian troops). Also, a small part of a concrete wall separating the dam and the power plant collapsed on April 23 (44 days before the dam failed), which was said by NYT experts to be possible evidence of erosion near the dam.

According to the dam experts consulted by the NYT, neither this earlier damage nor the pressure caused by the high water level would have been enough to cause the structural damage to the dam foundation that occurred. There was a passageway inside the foundation that, according to experts, would have been the ideal location to plant explosives having enough force to blow up such a structure, and evidence suggests this is where they were planted. In the view of Nick Glumac, an engineering professor and explosives expert at the University of Illinois at Urbana-Champaign,

"It's hard for me to see how anything other than an internal explosion in the passageway could account for the damage. ... That's a massive amount of concrete to move".

The New York Times also consulted with Ben Dando, a seismologist at NORSAR, who said the two seismic signals detected at 2:35 a.m. and 2:54 a.m. are consistent with an explosion deep inside the dam and having enough force to blow the huge structure apart; they are not consistent with a dam collapsing from natural causes. Engineers interviewed by The New York Times made the same inference from the infrared heat signal picked up by a US satellite. Volker Oye, another NORSAR seismologist, said, "We see a pulse of energy which is focused, which is typical of an explosion". He said that a blast of this kind in this area but not due to an explosion would be an unusual coincidence. After the first blast, videos suggest that the water further tore apart the dam. According to engineers who study dam failures and were contacted by the New York Times, this kind of damage to such a huge concrete foundation would be very unlikely unless there was an explosion deep inside. The engineers said there would need to be an examination of the foundations to reach a final conclusion as to how the dam was destroyed.

According to analyses by Conflict Intelligence Team (CIT), it is more likely that the dam collapsed as a result of structural issues caused by the negligence of the Russians who were in control. CIT states that the gates being open on one side of the dam in an abnormal mode for eight consecutive months caused erosion in the soil on which the basement of the dam stood, reduced its load-bearing capacity, and resulted in the stability of the walls being compromised. CIT states that, under this scenario, Russian authorities are solely to blame for the dam failure.

CIT criticized the NYT analysis of a concrete wall (separating the dam and the power plant) that collapsed on 23 April (44 days before the dam failed), saying that NYT experts attributed this to erosion due to water discharge near the dam, but provided no explanation as to why erosion in that location could not have led to erosion of the dam's body. They also criticized the failure of the NYT experts to explain the gradual collapse of the road near the main generator hall in the days preceding the dam's disintegration.

CIT questioned how the 2:54 seismic event could be attributed to an explosion destroying the dam when local residents reported explosions at around 2:20 and the timestamp on video footage from Russian servicemen showed that the dam was already destroyed at 2:46. CIT asserted that the NYT analysis did not address how the gates being only open on one side for eight consecutive months affected the integrity of the dam and the formation of hydraulic jumps, nor whether the velocity of the water flow exceeded the non-eroding velocity.

According to Mark Mulligan, professor of Physical Geography at King's College London, "Structural failure resulting from the impact of earlier damage associated with the war remains a possibility. ...The very high level of water in the reservoir coupled with previous damage, leading to uncontrolled flows of water through the dam could lead to catastrophic structural failure".

According to Andrew Barr, an expert in the effects of blast damage on structures at the University of Sheffield, the dam actually had three different components: a central concrete section containing sluice gates to control water flow, called a barrage; a hydroelectric power plant (HPP) for power generation; and a long, earth-filled embankment dam. Very early video footage shows that the barrage was the first to go, most likely by explosives. Barr believes that the damage to the barrage exceeds what could have been accomplished by guided munitions and that, when the water level goes down, explosive damage should be easy to recognize. Barr believes that the HPP was the next to go, and that this could only have been achieved by an explosion below the turbine hall. This explosion would have been separate from any explosion that destroyed the barrage. Last to go was a portion of the earth-filled embankment, both above and below the dam, on the left side of the river (looking downstream). "Unlike the concrete barrage and power plant, the embankment is not designed to resist large flows of water, and does not experience them in normal operation. The sheer volume of water mobilised by the sudden appearance of the breach appears to have quickly scoured the soil away," he said. Barr supplied before and after images showing where each of the destroyed dam components had been.

== Responsibility ==
According to the Euroactiv media network, "most experts agree a Russian attack is the more likely" explanation for the dam's destruction. According to analyses by dam and engineering experts consulted by The New York Times, "the evidence clearly suggests the dam was crippled by an explosion set off by the side that controls it: Russia." A report issued by the international human rights law firm Global Rights Compliance (GRC) concluded that the destruction was caused by explosions set off by Russia. The GRC report specifically said that it is "highly likely" that destruction was caused by Russia, using "pre-emplaced explosives positioned at critical points within the dam's structure", and that this was "an 80% and above determination". The GRC report was issued by a "Mobile Justice Team". These teams were created to implement the Atrocity Crimes Advisory Group for Ukraine, which was established and funded by the European Union, the United States, and the United Kingdom on 25 May 2022, "to provide strategic advice and operational assistance to Ukraine's Office of the Prosecutor General (OPG) in the investigation and prosecution of atrocity crimes in Ukraine".

The Institute for the Study of War (ISW), in reference to the NYT report, concurred that "the preponderance of available evidence, reasoning, and rhetoric suggests that Russian forces deliberately damaged the dam". According to the ISW, Russia had a "greater and clearer interest in flooding the lower Dnipro" as it would widen the Dnieper and hinder a Ukrainian crossing, at the cost of flooding some of its own positions. Newsweek and Politico reported that Molfar, a Ukrainian, London-based OSINT group, published a report giving its analysis of the causes and chronology of the dam collapse, and concluding that Russia destroyed the dam.

An analysis by the Conflict Intelligence Team concludes that the dam collapsed as a result of structural issues caused by Russian negligence, and therefore Russia is responsible. Structural issues were considered a possibility by others as well. As mentioned above, journalist Peter Beaumont argues that the Russians may have allowed the water in the reservoir to reach an extraordinarily high level to make the collapse more destructive.

Ukrainian authorities have agreed with international experts who say that Russian forces destroyed the dam (Note: "The Russian-imposed mayor of the occupied settlement of Nova Kakhovk near the damaged dam [Vladimir Leontyev] ... said that there was no explosion at the station, but night strikes led to the destruction and water began to uncontrollably be discharged downstream. According to him, the armed forces of Ukraine continue to shell the city. The blow to the Kakhovskaya hydroelectric power station, presumably, was delivered from an MLRS. Leontyev said that it was impossible to predict whether the Kakhovskaya HPP would continue to collapse. According to him, the hydroelectric power plant suffered serious damage and it was impossible to repair it. He stated that the destruction at the station would lead to problems in the delivery of water to the Crimea.") by means of a blast from inside the engine room. In regards to motivation, Ukrainian officials said Russia destroyed the dam "in a panic" to slow down Ukraine's planned counteroffensive. Ukraine specifically blamed Russia's 205th Separate Motor Rifle Brigade, based at Nova Kakhovka, for blowing up the dam. Investigative journalists from the Slidstvo.Info agency and from the Schemes project (an investigative news project run by Radio Free Europe/Radio Liberty's Ukrainian Service) reported that they received incriminating intercepted conversations involving individually identified members of the 205th brigade. The conversations begin at 2:20, right before the dam was destroyed, mention that they are preparing to do something "all on command" and state that there was an "emergency event". At the end they were told to pack up very quickly and leave. The brigade's Telegram channel warned in October 2022 that the dam was mined and would be blown up if Ukrainian forces attempted to cross the Dnieper, also giving advice for Russian troops to stay safe. On 9 June, the Security Service of Ukraine released what they said was an intercepted call between two Russian officers admitting responsibility for the destruction. In the call, the alleged officers say that the explosion was supposed to "scare" people but "(they did) more than what they planned for."

The European Parliament announced on 15 June 2023 that it had adopted a resolution that condemned in the strongest possible terms Russia's destruction of the Kakhovka dam on 6 June, saying that this constituted a war crime. The Parliament also called for Ukraine to join NATO. According to The New York Times, "a senior American military official" reported that the U.S. government "had ruled out an external attack on the dam, like a missile, bomb or some other projectile, and now assesses that the explosion came from one or more charges set inside it, most likely by Russian operatives."

Russian government figures initially said the dam was undamaged, but later denied responsibility and blamed Ukraine.

== Effects ==
=== Casualties ===
At least 59 people were reported to have died from the effects of the dam's destruction, according to Russian authorities, while Ukraine's Interior Minister reported 31 were killed, 29 in Kherson and two in Mykolaiv Oblast.

The Associated Press reported in December 2023 that Russian occupation authorities vastly and deliberately undercounted casualties by immediately removing bodies not claimed by family, and preventing local health workers and volunteers from dealing with the dead and threatening them when they defied orders. Ukrainian health workers estimate that the number is at least in the hundreds, but an exact number may never be known.

=== Flooding and evacuations ===
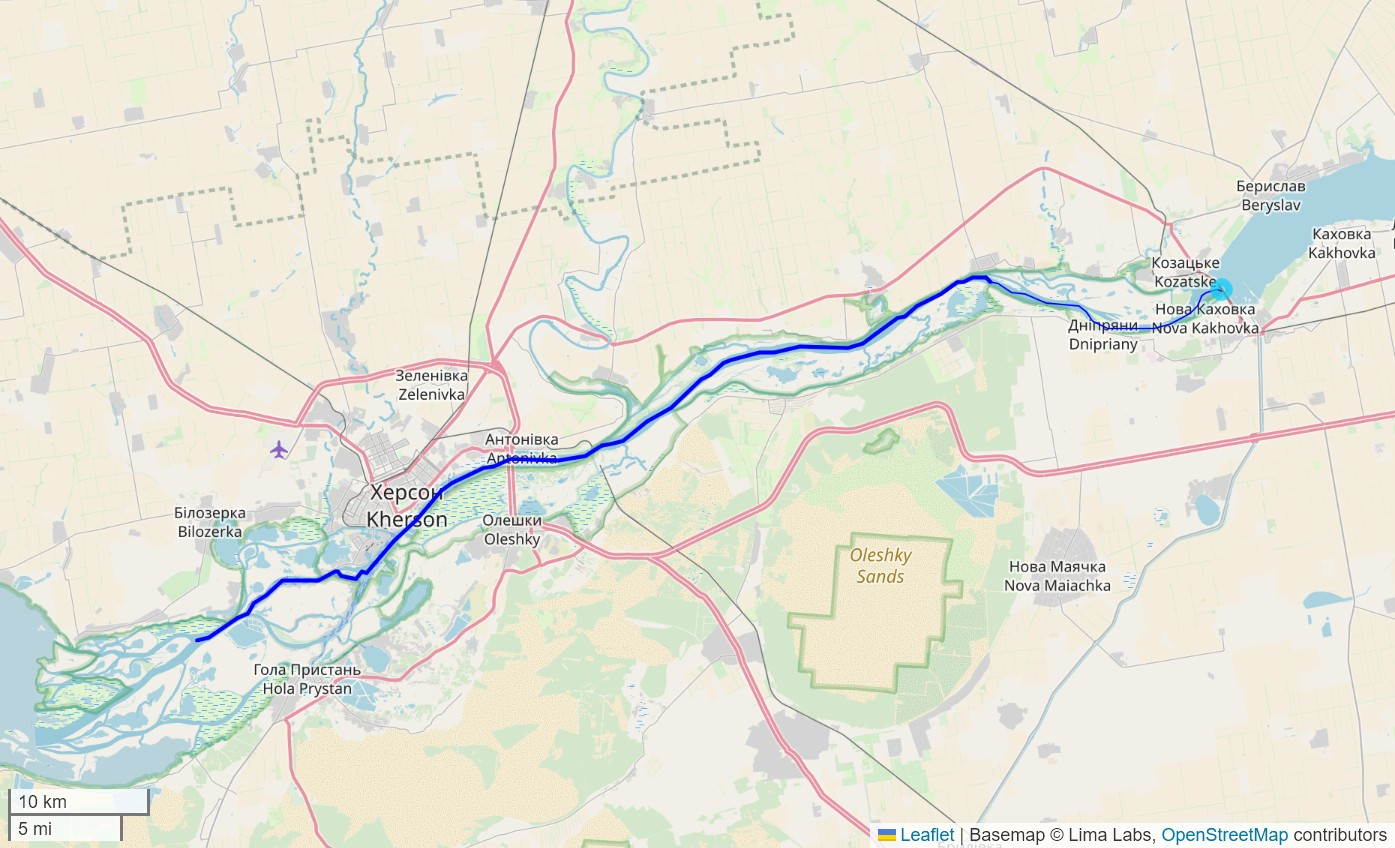
The main flow path on the Dnieper River downstream of the Nova Kakhovka dam

State Emergency Service of Ukraine evacuates residents of flooded settlements.

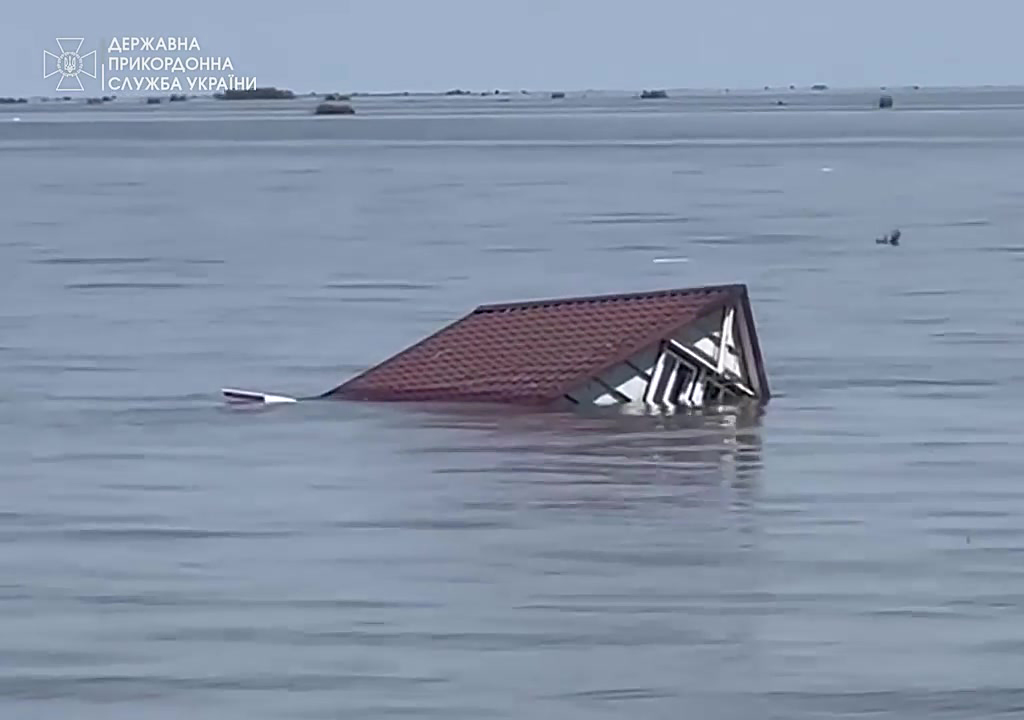
Wreckage washed into Black Sea (Odesa Oblast)

Before and after satellite images starkly show the extent of the flooding.

The day after the dam's destruction, Ukraine's prosecutor general estimated that about 40,000 people located in Ukrainian- and Russian-controlled land were likely to be impacted by flooding. The Ukrainian governor of Kherson Oblast, Oleksandr Prokudin, said that about 600 square kilometres (230 sq mi) of the region was underwater and that 68 percent of the flooded territory was on the Russian-controlled side.

The flooding along the Dnieper also resulted in a backflow along its right-bank tributary, the Inhulets River, causing flooding in Kherson as well as in Mykolaiv Oblast.

The National Police of Ukraine ordered an evacuation in the Ukrainian-controlled western bank of the Dnieper, including Mykolaivka, Olhivka, Lvove, Tiahynka, Poniativka, Ivanivka, Tokarivka, Prydniprovske, Sadove and the Korabel Island district of Kherson city. The governor of Kherson Oblast, Oleksandr Prokudin, told Ukrainian TV on the morning of 6 June that eight villages had been flooded, and that evacuations by bus and train were ongoing for 16,000 residents in the affected areas.

According to the Ukrainian ground forces, the Russian army continued to shell the right bank during the evacuation. On 7 June, Zelenskyy alleged to Politico Europe that Russian forces were murdering rescuers working at the site of the flood. Three people were killed after Russian forces opened fire on an evacuation boat on 12 June.

In Russian-controlled Nova Kakhovka by the eastern end of the dam, 22,000 people live in flood risk areas, and 600 houses were reported to have been flooded. A state of emergency on the left bank of the river was declared by Russian authorities. On the morning of 6 June, Andrey Alekseyenko, acting head of the Russian-installed Kherson military-civilian administration, reported on Telegram that fourteen localities were on the area on risk of flooding on the Russian-controlled bank of the river: Bilohrudove, Dnipriany, Hola Prystan, Kardashynka, Kokhany, Korsunka, Kozachi Laheri, Krynky, Mala Kardashynka, Oleshky, Pishchanivka, Solontsi, Stara Zburyivka and Zabaryne, as well as the islands of the lower Dnieper.

Ukrainian authorities said an evacuation of 17,000 people was underway from the territories under Ukrainian control, with 24 villages flooded.

The Ukrainian Environment Ministry reported on 25 June that the Dnipro had returned to its normal banks.

=== Animals and environment ===
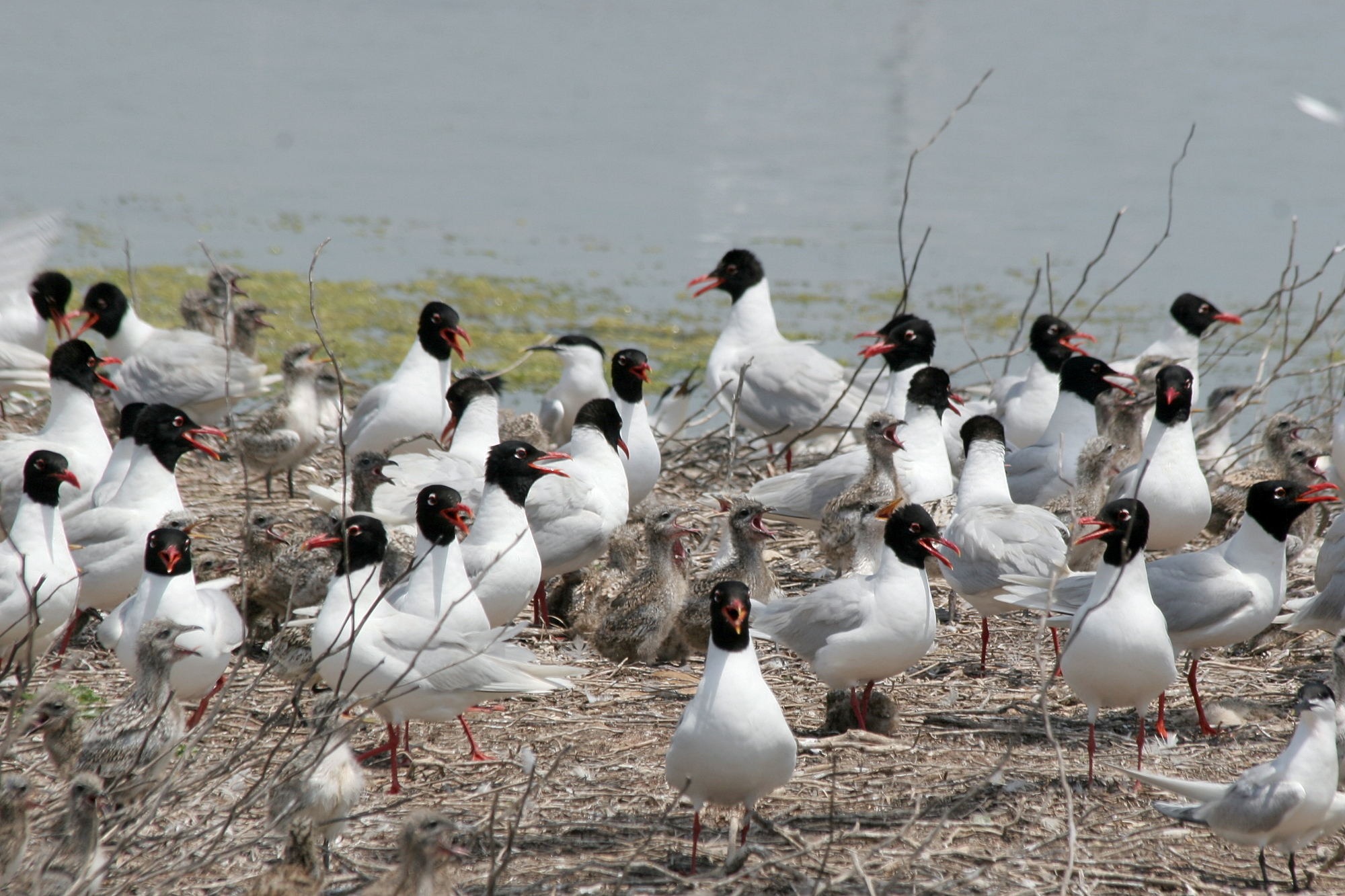
Mediterranean gulls breeding in the Black Sea Biosphere Reserve. Around half the global population of this bird nests here on low islands, and are likely to lose their 2023 breeding season in the flooding.

A number of wildlife habitats were flooded. Some 300 animals at the Fairytale Dibrova Zoo drowned in the disaster. The zoo was just downstream and to the west of the dam. In the immediate aftermath, Russian news agency TASS falsely claimed the zoo did not even exist before backtracking and admitting that there was a zoo but insisted all animals were safe. A video showing locals having to move cattle and pets through floods was widely distributed on social media.

The Red Cross warned that minefields were washed away. Erik Tollefsen, head of Red Cross's weapons section, said:

"We knew where the hazards were ... Now we don't know. All we know is that they are somewhere downstream."

Former minister of ecology Ostap Semerak said that this was the biggest environmental catastrophe in Ukraine since the 1986 Chernobyl disaster.

The Ukrainian Nature Conservation Group issued a report that detailed the environmental devastation.

Andriy Yermak, head of the Office of the President of Ukraine, said on 20 June, "More than 50,000 hectares (120,000 acres) of Ukrainian forests have been flooded and at least half of them (trees) will die. This is more than the area of forests in Iceland." He also said that the Kakhovka Reservoir was covered with 95,000 tons of dead fish.

The Grand Meadow National Nature Park, a protected area consisting of 13 islands in the northeastern part of the Kakhovka Reservoir was completely drained, raising fears of a drought, while water levels decreased by approximately 13 meters in the Kamianska Sich National Nature Park, according to the Ukrainian Environment Ministry. The Governor of Kherson Oblast, Oleksandr Prokudin, also said that the Askania-Nova biosphere reserve downstream from the dam was also devastated by the inundation caused by the latter's collapse.

The release of chemicals such as ammonia and bacteria such as Salmonella, Escherichia coli and Vibrio cholerae into the Dnipro-Buh Delta and the Black Sea following the dam's destruction led to beach closures and fishing bans across Odesa and Mykolaiv oblasts. Authorities said the contamination of those areas had turned them into "garbage dumps" and "animal cemeteries." In the weeks following the dam's destruction, Ukraine claimed that outbreaks of intestinal diseases such as cholera had broken out in Russian-occupied areas of Kherson Oblast and Crimea, adding that several Russian soldiers had died as a result.

According to ecologist Alexey Vasilyuk, for decades industrial waste from Zaporizhzhia, including a huge amount of heavy metals, settled in the mud at the bottom of the Kakhovka Reservoir since there was no flow to disturb it. Now, the current in the river raises this waste into the water column and moves it downstream. Also, the area that used to be at the bottom of the reservoir but has now dried out will begin to be blown away by the wind, allowing these metals to be absorbed into plants that people and animals eat. Vaslyuk advises that the sowing of grasses in these bare areas will help prevent dispersion of these metals.

The year after the dam's destruction, wildlife returned to the Great Meadow, area that had been under the reservoir. Fish that had been locally extirpated by the dam, such as sturgeon and herring, returned, and willow and poplar trees have sprouted and grown.

=== Military impact ===
The flooding was widely expected to hinder a planned Ukrainian counteroffensive by making it harder for the Ukrainian army to cross the Dnieper River into Russian-occupied territory. Vladimir Saldo, the Russian-installed governor of occupied Kherson, said the breach would help Russian forces defend the area, saying, "In military terms, the situation has worked out in a way that is operationally and tactically in favour of Russian forces".

Many analysts noted that the breach, which eliminated the road on the dam, left only the Antonivsky Bridge in Kherson city as a paved river crossing. Former Ukraine defence minister Andrii Zahorodniuk said, "It effectively makes crossing the river in that area impossible...Even conducting operations in that whole area will be much more difficult." On 2 July, 70 Ukrainian soldiers landed under the Russian-controlled end of the Antonivskyi Bridge on the left bank of the Dnieper river, in the first crossing since the dam's destruction.

Analysts also noted that floodwaters would make the soil on the Russian side of the river swampy for weeks to come, preventing its use by heavy machinery such as tanks. The increased difficulty of moving forces in the area would help secure the Russian southern flank, freeing up military resources to repel Ukraine's offensive in Zaporizhzhia Oblast.

Furthermore, the civil emergency could be expected to drain resources that could otherwise have been used by Ukraine in the war.

Five days after the breach, Ukrainian Deputy Defense Minister Hanna Malyar said on 11 June that Russian forces were transferring their most combat-capable forces from Kherson to Bakhmut, adding that Russia likely destroyed the dam to shorten its defensive lines in Kherson ahead of the Ukrainian counteroffensive. But four days later, the Institute for the Study of War said that they had not yet observed Russian elements moving from Kherson to Bakhmut.

The British Defense Ministry said on 19 June that over the previous 10 days Russia had moved elements of its Dnipro Group of Forces from the eastern bank of the Dnieper River to reinforce the Zaporizhzhia and Bakhmut sectors, and that this likely reflects Russia's perception that a major Ukrainian attack across the Dnieper had become less likely.

Retired U.S. general David Petraeus said on June 6 that the breach would cause no "military implications that are particularly large" because "the period of time that this is under water restricts the trafficability and so forth, but over time that will clear up." Petraeus said that as the flood waters recede, the river will actually become shallower and easier to cross. (Note: "I'm a bit mystified as to why the Russians would have done that—if they did it deliberately with an explosion—given that it causes great problems for them in areas that they occupy, including this particular area ... . The downsides for the Russians seem to be quite considerable, and that obviously raises questions about why they would have sought to cause this kind of significant downside for them: I don't see any real implications for the counteroffensive; I don't see other military implications that are particularly large. Obviously, the period of time that this is under water restricts the trafficability and so forth, but over time that will clear up." — Gen. David Petraeus (9 June 2023, BBC Radio 4)) He also said that this event will not prove to be a decisive hindrance to Ukraine. "I think they are going to crack the Russians. I think the Russians will prove to be quite brittle."

Before the breach, the Kakhovka Reservoir was 5–20 km (3.1–12.4 mi) wide, and quite difficult for an army to cross. As of 20 June, satellite images show that it has reverted to a river 500–1,000 m (1,600–3,300 ft) wide with the flood plain on either side rapidly drying out. In some places it seems that it could be possible to cross the Dnieper River in a 4WD. It has been asserted that the Ukrainian military could take advantage of this, and of the fact that the Russians have moved troops from that area to buttress their forces in Zaporizhzhia and the Donbas, to cross the Dnieper by assault. In addition, the Ukrainians control the dams and reservoirs on the Dnieper upstream from Kakhovka, and could choose to hold more water there to dry up the river downstream and make it easier to cross.

On 15 November, Russia conceded that Ukrainian forces have been able to cross the Dnieper river, but claimed that they face "fiery hell", insisting that "the Ukrainian assault would be thwarted."

=== Water supply ===
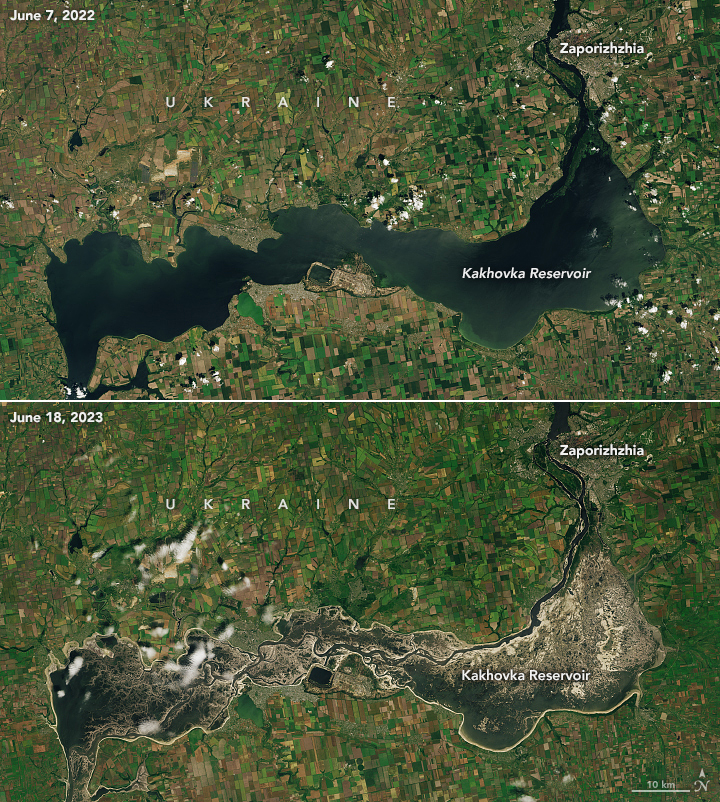
Kakhovka Reservoir on 7 June 2022 (top) and 18 June 2023 (bottom)

Satellite images showing the Dnipro River at Kherson on 1 and 9 June 2023

Water from the dam reservoir supplies Southern Ukraine, Crimea, and the Zaporizhzhia Nuclear Power Plant. As floods affected water pipes in Southern Ukraine, President Zelenskyy said that hundreds of thousands of people do not have "normal access to drinking water" in the region. Residents were urged to boil water for potential contamination. The United Nations later estimated that about 700,000 people in the area were in need of clean drinking water, while over a million people in Dnipropetrovsk Oblast alone were expected to face water shortages.

A minimum water level in the Kakhovka Reservoir of 12.7 m (42 ft) is needed to provide cooling water for the Zaporizhzhia Nuclear Power Plant. However, there are several alternative sources adequate for essential cooling water while the reactors are in their current shutdown state. The International Atomic Energy Agency Director General said "Our current assessment is that there is no immediate risk to the safety of the plant".

The head of Ukraine's hydropower generating company Ukrhydroenergo announced that the water level had dropped below the "dead" point of 12.7 m (42 ft), meaning that water could no longer be withdrawn for settlements and for the Zaporizhzhia Nuclear Power Plant. How low it could go would depend on whether the lower part of the dam had been destroyed to its base. If so, the water level would reach about 3 m (9.8 ft) and the width of the reservoir would decrease from 3.5 km (2.2 mi) to 1–1.2 km (0.62–0.75 mi). Initially, the water level was reported to fall 0.35 m (1 ft 2 in) per hour. Twenty-four hours after the breach, the water level at Nikopol had fallen 2.5 m (8 ft 2 in) and stood at 14.41 m (47.3 ft). After 48 hours the level was 13.05 m (42.8 ft). Ukrhydroenergo announced on 26 June that the Kakhovka Reservoir had become "catastrophically" shallow. The average level of the lower pool near the dam was 12.88 m (42.3 ft). On 25 June the average depth of the reservoir was 7–8 m (23–26 ft), and could go to 3 m (9.8 ft). According to the Ukrainian Hydromedical Center the Dnipro River water level at Kherson had returned to its level before the dam was destroyed. Before the destruction of the dam the water level was over 17 m (56 ft).

Oleksandr Kubrakov, Minister of Infrastructure of Ukraine, announced on 3 July that Ukraine had begun the construction from scratch of three pipelines totaling almost 150 km (93 mi) in order to supply drinking water to more than 1 million people from Zaporizhzhia, Kherson, Mykolaiv, and Dnipropetrovsk oblasts. He announced that ₴1.5 billion (US$41M) had been allocated to this from the Fund for Dealing with the Aftermath of Armed Aggression, which as of 15 May had a total of ₴61.6 billion (US$1.6B).

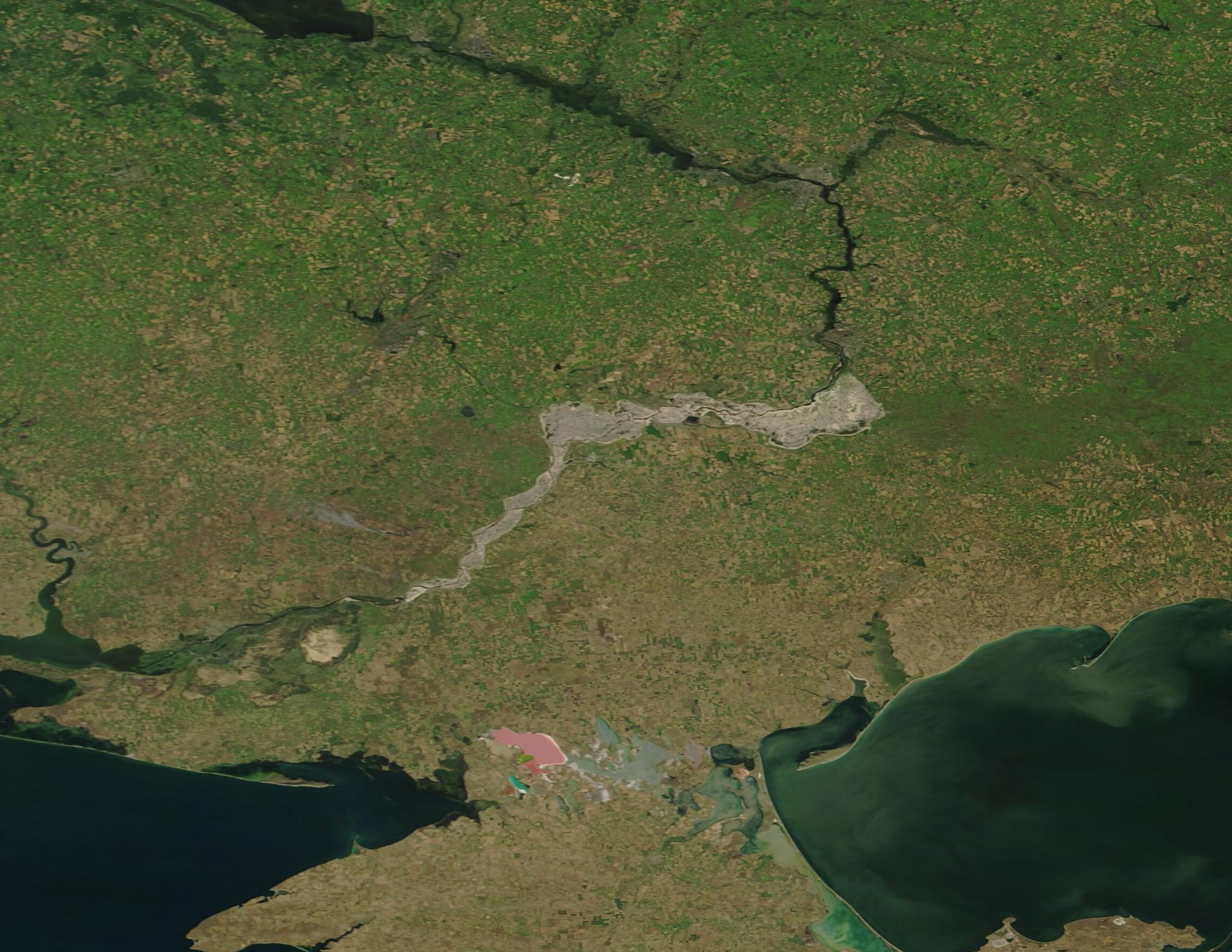
8 August 2023 satellite photo of the now-dried-up reservoir

Ukrhydroenergo also announced that it was working on a project to build an "overlay" across the dam and hydroelectric station that would restore water levels to the levels before the explosion. The overlay project would start once Russian forces leave the east side of the Dnieper and would be expected to take two months. Conversely, according to the Russian-installed governor of Kherson Vladimir Saldo, any restoration work on the dam and power plant will be performed by the Russian side, and only after Ukrainian troops are pushed away to a safe distance. There has been no announcement of a resolution to this impasse thus far.

On 21 June, satellite images revealed that the reservoir had largely dried up, exposing shallower parts, revealing the original course of the Dnipro and leading to the disconnection of four canal networks. As of 20 June, the reservoir's water surface area had shrunk to 509.2 km^{2} (196.6 sq mi), less than a quarter of its former area.

A number of new wells are being dug to provide for the local water needs. According to Andriy Volodin, who is overseeing the work of digging new wells, after the water drained from the reservoir the water table in the area fell dramatically. Before the dam was destroyed, wells would reach groundwater at 38 m (125 ft) but by September they had to drill 60–70 m (200–230 ft). According to Volodin, "The weight of the Kakhovka Reservoir used to push the water up toward the surface. Now the pressure is gone, and it has receded." He said that the water from these wells, though a bit salty, will suffice for irrigation. The village of Malokaterynivka lost its water supply and now must be supplied by truck.

=== North Crimean Canal ===
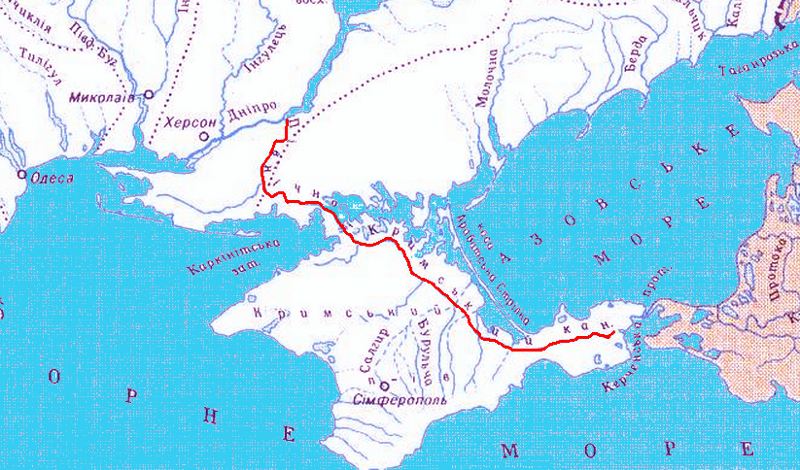
The North Crimean Canal provides 85% of Crimea's fresh water.

North Crimean Canal Intake
- Interactive map of North Crimean Canal Intake
- Coordinates: 46°46′N 33°23.7′E

The North Crimean Canal, normally active from March until December, is more than 400 km (250 mi) long and has traditionally supplied 85% of Crimea's water. Up to 80% of this water was used in agriculture and 60% of that was used for rice farming and pond fish farming. The southern coast around Sevastopol has its own water resources, so canal water is mostly needed in central and northern Crimea. After the Russian takeover of Crimea in 2014, Ukraine blocked the canal, claiming that Crimea had accumulated a huge debt for water supplied the previous year. This resulted in eight years of halted water flow, and was only unblocked in March 2022 after the Russians gained control of Kherson Oblast. Land used for farming shrank from 450,000 to 15,000 hectares (1,112,000 to 37,000 acres), and rice and buckwheat cultivation had to be stopped.

The canal begins at Tavriisk, where the water intake is just upstream from the destroyed dam. The Russian-installed mayor of Nova Kakhovka said that the dam's destruction would cause "problems" with water supplies to Crimea from the North Crimean Canal. According to Dmitry Peskov, Vladimir Putin's press secretary, the dam's destruction was a "calculated Ukrainian attempt to choke off water supplies" to Crimea. "Clearly one of the aims of this act of sabotage was to deprive Crimea of water—the water level in the reservoir is dropping and, accordingly, the water supply to the canal is being drastically reduced," he said. The Crimean occupation authority said that there was "no threat of the North Crimean Canal losing water". The reservoirs on the peninsula were filled to about 80% according to Sergey Aksyonov, the head of the Russian-annexed, but internationally unrecognised, Republic of Crimea.

On 10 June 2023 the Institute for the Study of War referenced a Russian video reportedly showing that the North Crimean Canal had become dry, contradicting the recent Russian statements that there was no threat of the canal losing water. The Ukrainians accused the Russians of not having a clear plan on how to solve the problem, and trying to avoid the issue and resorting to propaganda in order to prevent panic among the local population instead of working in terms of infrastructure.

Ihor Syrota, the head of Ukraine's hydro electric company Ukrhydroenergo, said on 12 June 2023 that given that the water level in the Kakhovka Reservoir is much lower than the intake level of the North Crimean Canal, water would not flow to Crimea through the canal "for at least a year".

According to Christopher Binnie, a water engineer specializing in dams and water resources development, "Pumping for water supply to the Crimea could restart fairly soon." Sergey Aksyonov said that by installing pumps on the Dnieper River, up to 40 m^{3}/sec could be supplied to the canal, and that this would improve the situation.

The normal flow rate of water in the North Crimean Canal seems to be subject to some disagreement, but according to the Ukrainian State Agency for Water Resources the normal water flow rate in the head of the canal is 82 m^{3}/sec. Concurring roughly with this is Agribusiness Global (90 m^{3}/sec), so the proposed rate by pumping would result in half the normal rate. Water flows through the North Crimean Canal by gravity until it reaches the Dzhankoi district, where it meets the first of a series of pumping stations that must pump it uphill. The first pumping station has a capacity of about 70 m^{3}/sec. According to First Deputy Prime Minister of Russian-annexed Crimea, Rustam Temirgaliyev in 2014, the normal flow of water through the North Crimean Canal was 50 m^{3}/sec. A number of other sources also report this figure. Euromaidan Press reports 294 m^{3}/sec as does another source. On the high end is a source reporting 380 m^{3}/sec, with 80 m^{3}/sec of this going to Kherson and the remainder going to Crimea.

According to a 2023 study, in the early 1990s annual water flows into the canal from the reservoir reached 3.5 km^{3}, but a more economical use of water reduced this to 1.5 km^{3}, of which 0.5 km^{3} were used in the Kherson Oblast and 1.0 km^{3} in Crimea. In 2014, after the annexation of Crimea, this was reduced to 0.5 km^{3}, according to the study. 1.5 km^{3} is the amount of water that would result from a flow of 47.5 m^{3}/sec for one year. According to a 2017 study in a Russian journal, in 2013, the total water intake of Crimea amounted to 1,553.78 million m^{3}, of which 86.65% came from the North Crimean Canal, 8.78% from local runoff, 4.41% from underground water, and 0.16% from seawater. This means that 1,346.35 million m^{3} came from the canal, which translates to a flow rate of 42.7 m^{3}/sec during 2013, according to this source. If 1/3 of the water entering the North Crimean Canal was distributed in Kherson, as indicated by the 2023 study, and 1,346.35 million m^{3} arrived in Crimea, then this indicates a water flow into the canal during 2013 of 64 m^{3}/sec.

The average flow in the Dnieper River is about 1,670 m^{3}/sec. The amount of water flowing past the intake point of the North Crimean Canal is regulated by the five reservoirs upstream on the Dnieper River, all controlled by Ukraine. Two major canals take in water upstream from the North Crimean Canal, from what was originally the Kakhovka Reservoir: the Kakhovsky Canal and the Dnieper-Kryvyi Rih canal. Also taking water from the former Kakhovka Reservoir were various minor irrigation systems, freshwater fish farms, and systems supplying water to cities such as Zaporizhzhia. The total withdrawal of water from the Kakhovka Reservoir just for large canals was estimated at 900 m^{3}/sec.

=== Farming ===
The area that had been irrigated by the Kakhovka Reservoir typically receives 100–120 mm (3.9–4.7 inches) of rainfall during the summer growing season, which is ordinarily not enough for all crops to thrive unless irrigated. Before the Dnieper River was dammed to create the Kakhovka reservoir, most of Kherson and Zaporizhzhia were arid areas. According to the Ukrainian Ministry of Agriculture, the destruction of the dam will leave 584,000 ha (1.44 million acres; 5,840 km^{2}; 2,250 mi^{2}) of land without irrigation, turning them into "deserts". In 2021, farmers harvested from this land about 4 million tons of grains and oilseeds, representing about 4% of Ukraine's grains and oilseeds production. 94% of the irrigation systems in Kherson Oblast, 74% of those in Zaporizhzhia Oblast and 30% of those in Dnipropetrovsk Oblast will be without water. Even without the disaster, Ukraine's grains and oilseeds production was expected to be down 8% from the output of 2022, and down 36% from the output of 2021 (the year before the war began), according to the Ukrainian Grain Association.

Oleksandr Krasnolutskyi, Ukraine's deputy minister of environmental protection and natural resources, stated that the floodwater has washed away the topsoil layers from thousands of hectares of farms and arable lands. "We will not be able to cultivate agricultural plants on this soil for many years ahead," he said.

Ukraine is in no danger of famine. Before the war Ukraine harvested 50 million tons of grain but the domestic need was only 20 million tons. The dam disaster, however, will lead to lower farming revenue for Ukraine and could result in food shortages on world markets and potentially famine in poor countries that rely on Ukrainian grain exports.

The Ukrainian government has announced financial assistance for farmers affected by the dam destruction in the amount of ₴3,318 (US$90) for a vegetable harvest loss of 0.01 ha (0.025 acres), with a maximum of 0.2 ha (0.49 acres) in the Mykolaiv Oblast and 0.3 ha (0.74 acres) in the Kherson Oblast.

=== Fisheries ===
In an interview on 13 July 2023 Mykola Solskyi, Minister of Agrarian Policy and Food of Ukraine, stated that as a result of draining the Kakhovka Reservoir 11,400 tons of fish were lost, worth ₴9.8 billion (US$267M). He said that 85 fisheries were destroyed: 49 in the Kakhovka Reservoir and 36 in the Dnieper-Bug estuary. The Kakhovka Reservoir served as a habitat to at least 43 fish species, 20 of which have commercial importance (with annual catches up to 2,600 tons). It has been estimated that it would take at least 7–10 years to restore the lost fish stocks.

=== Energy ===
The destruction of the Kakhovka Hydroelectric Power Plant has resulted in the loss of 350 MW of hydro-generation capacity in the region, which is enough to power 350,000 typical European homes.

=== Costs of reconstruction ===
In March 2023 (prior to the destruction of the dam) a joint assessment was released by the Government of Ukraine, the World Bank, the European Commission, and the United Nations, estimating the total cost of reconstruction and recovery in Ukraine to be US$411 billion (€383 billion). This could eventually exceed US$1 trillion (€911 billion), depending on the course of the war.

Ivan Perehinets, a department head at Ukraine's Academy of Construction, said in an interview on 19 June with Ukrainian Radio that it would cost US$60–70 billion (€55-64 billion) to restore housing and infrastructure in Kherson Oblast that was damaged by the destruction of the dam, and that reconstruction efforts would take 5–10 years and require 1.5 million workers.

Ruslan Strilets, Ukrainian Minister of Environmental Protection and Natural Resources, said on 21 June that the destruction of the dam caused an initial US$1.5 billion of damage, and also warned that Russian mines released by flooding could float onto the shores of other European countries. A separate estimate by the Ukrainian Agriculture Ministry tallied damage to water reclamation systems and canals at ₴150–160 billion (US$4.1–4.3 billion). According to an analysis by the Kyiv School of Economics the direct losses caused by the dam collapse amounted to at least US$2 billion, with indirect costs adding much more. The United Nations later estimated the total amount of damage at about $14 billion, with the immediate damage associated with the initial destruction and flooding costing about $2.79 billion to infrastructure alone.

The use of Russian frozen assets to pay these costs is being considered but institutions such as the European Central Bank insist that the eurozone's financial stability, as well as the strength of its common currency, depend on stabilizing mechanisms such as sovereign immunity and the various international treaties that are in place, and finding a way to confiscate the frozen assets without violating such principles and treaties has proven to be elusive.

The Ukrainian Ministry of Reintegration reported on 23 August that the government had allocated ₴4.6 billion (US$124 million) towards reconstruction measures for the Kakhovka dam, adding that around ₴1.3 billion (US$35 million) had been allocated to the reconstruction of damaged and destroyed homes in the flood zone. The Ministry said that the funds would enable affected residents to "have the resources to repair their homes before winter". More than 340 applications for compensation for crop losses were submitted and payments of Hr 2.7 million had been established.

Ukraine has begun the second stage of the "e‑Restore" program, designed to compensate residents for housing destroyed or damaged during the war. The first stage, begun in May 2023, was limited to ₴200,000 per house (US$5,400), and 1,400 applicants received ₴114 million (US$3.1 million). The second stage, begun 18 July, will not have restrictions on the amount of compensation but certain limitations apply, and the amount to be compensated will be calculated according to a specific formula. Stage two was described as a "beta test" and will only be operational in two villages in Kyiv Oblast, but if successful it could be expanded to regions affected by the flooding when the dam collapsed.

== Legal responses ==
According to former Deputy Prosecutor General of Ukraine Gyunduz Mamedov, Ukraine should apply to the Secretary General of the UN to establish an advisory council in response to the violation of the Environmental Modification Convention, to which both Ukraine and Russia are party. Mamedov also said that a case should be submitted to the International Court of Justice to obtain compensation for the damage caused.

Greenpeace legal advisor Daniel Simons said on 13 June 2023 that a trial against the perpetrator of the dam destruction could be launched in the International Criminal Court (ICC), in The Hague, if sufficient evidence appears. "Article 8(2)(b)(iv) of the Rome Statute of the [International Criminal Court] qualifies as a crime the intentional attack that causes extensive, lasting, and serious damage to the surrounding natural environment, which will be clearly excessive in comparison with concrete and immediately expected general military advantage," he said. ICC investigators were already evaluating evidence of damage caused to critical and civilian infrastructure in Ukraine in order to determine whether criminal charges were warranted. Russia, the United States, and China have all refused to submit to the ICC. The ICC has already issued an arrest warrant for Russian president Vladimir Putin, in connection with the illegal transfer of children from occupied Ukraine, so he could be arrested if he were to set foot in any of the 123 countries that are party to the Rome Statute, which is the treaty that established the ICC. The ICC does not conduct trials in absentia, so no ICC trial against Putin will take place as long as he remains in Russia.

Both Russia and Ukraine have appealed to the ICC and to the International Court of Justice (also known as the World Court), claiming that the other side is at fault.

The destruction of the dam has been described by Western leaders as a war crime; Article 56 of Protocol I to the Geneva Conventions (which both Russia and Ukraine have ratified) prohibits the deliberate destruction of "installations containing dangerous forces" such as dams.

== Reactions ==
=== Ukrainian reactions ===
Ukrainian President Volodymyr Zelenskyy said, "The destruction of the Kakhovka hydroelectric power plant dam by Russian terrorists only confirms for the whole world that they must be expelled from every corner of Ukrainian land." Andriy Yermak, the Head of the Office of the President of Ukraine, called the destruction of the dam "ecocide". The Ukrainian Ministry of Foreign Affairs said, "We call on the international community to resolutely condemn the Russian terrorist attack on the Kakhovka HPP (Hydroelectric Power Plant)", calling for a UNSC session and a meeting with the IAEA. Ukraine's Prosecutor General said it was investigating the destruction as a war crime.

Ukrainian foreign minister Dmytro Kuleba criticized the international media for initially presenting the Ukrainian and Russian claims as equally credible, arguing that this "put facts and propaganda on [an] equal footing."

Former Ukrainian Minister of Ecology Ostap Semerak said: "This will have an impact on Romania, Georgia, Turkey, and Bulgaria. It will be harmful for all the region. Our government has announced this is the biggest environmental catastrophe in Europe over the past 10 years, and I think it may be the worst in Ukraine since Chornobyl in 1986."

=== Russian reactions ===
Russian authorities blamed Ukraine, and Russian president Vladimir Putin called it "a barbaric act which has led to a large-scale environmental and humanitarian catastrophe". Kremlin spokesman Dmitry Peskov called it a "sabotage" as a result of the Ukrainian armed forces "not achieving their goals". Minister of Defence Sergey Shoigu said that Ukraine blew up the dam to "prevent Russian offensive in this sector of the front". Vladimir Saldo, the Russian-installed governor of occupied Kherson oblast, said the dam breach "is operationally and tactically in favour of Russian forces". TASS reported that flooding made a Ukrainian crossing of the Dnieper impossible. Russian Foreign Ministry spokeswoman Maria Zakharova said the incident should be subject to a "worldwide study, research and investigation" and accused the West of having an "endless desire to blame Russia for everything". On 13 June Putin once again spoke on the subject and stated that the destruction of the dam "thwarted Ukrainian offensive", and further suggested past HIMARS strikes were responsible for the disaster.

=== International reactions ===
António Guterres, the UN Secretary-General, called the collapse "another devastating consequence of the Russian invasion of Ukraine", and said "Attacks against civilians and critical civilian infrastructure must stop." NATO Secretary General Jens Stoltenberg called the event "outrageous" and said it showed "the brutality of Russia's war in Ukraine". European Council President Charles Michel called the blowing up of a hydroelectric power plant a war crime on the part of Russia. The Council of Europe stated: "We condemn in the strongest terms the destruction of the Nova Kakhovka dam in the Kherson region of Ukraine".

President of Romania Klaus Iohannis condemned the destruction of the dam and referred to it as "another war crime by Russia against innocent civilians". He also called for Russia to be held accountable and expressed his sympathy with the victims. The Moldovan President Maia Sandu and Prime Minister Dorin Recean condemned the incident and said Moldova was ready to provide help to Ukraine to mitigate the flood damage. German Chancellor Olaf Scholz said "this is aggression by the Russian side to stop the Ukrainian offensive". The Ministry of Foreign Affairs of the Czech Republic said Russia's actions were "deliberately endangering the lives of tens of thousands" of civilians and "must be condemned and punished". British Prime Minister Rishi Sunak said it was too early to definitively say Russia was responsible for the breach, and that British intelligence agencies were investigating the cause. British Foreign Secretary James Cleverly, who was in Ukraine at the time, said "the only reason this is an issue at all is because of Russia's unprovoked full-scale invasion of Ukraine." France's Emmanuel Macron said it was an "atrocious act". France also said it was delivering aid including water purifiers, 500,000 water purification tablets and hygiene kits to assist people displaced by the disaster. The German Marshall Fund released a report on 21 June 2023 saying that Russia has launched an "aggressive" propaganda campaign to blame Ukraine for the Kakhovka Dam collapse.

China's permanent representative to the United Nations, Zhang Jun, called "on all parties to the conflict to abide by international humanitarian law and do their utmost to protect civilians and civilian infrastructure." Turkish President Recep Tayyip Erdoğan's office said after the call with Zelenskyy that "a commission could be established with the participation of experts from the warring parties, the United Nations and the international community, including Turkey, for a detailed investigation into the explosion at Kakhovka dam."

== Aftermath ==
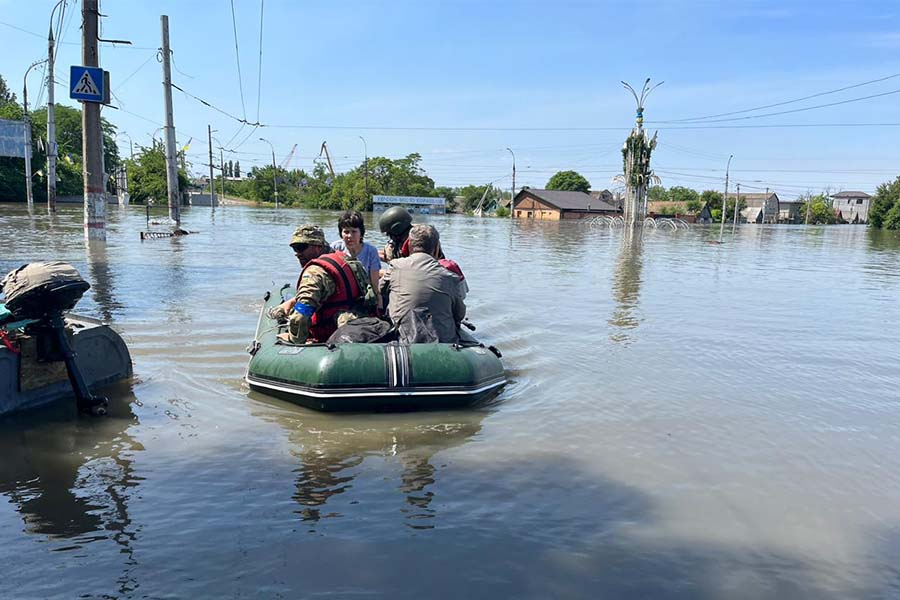
Kherson flooded on 7 June 2023

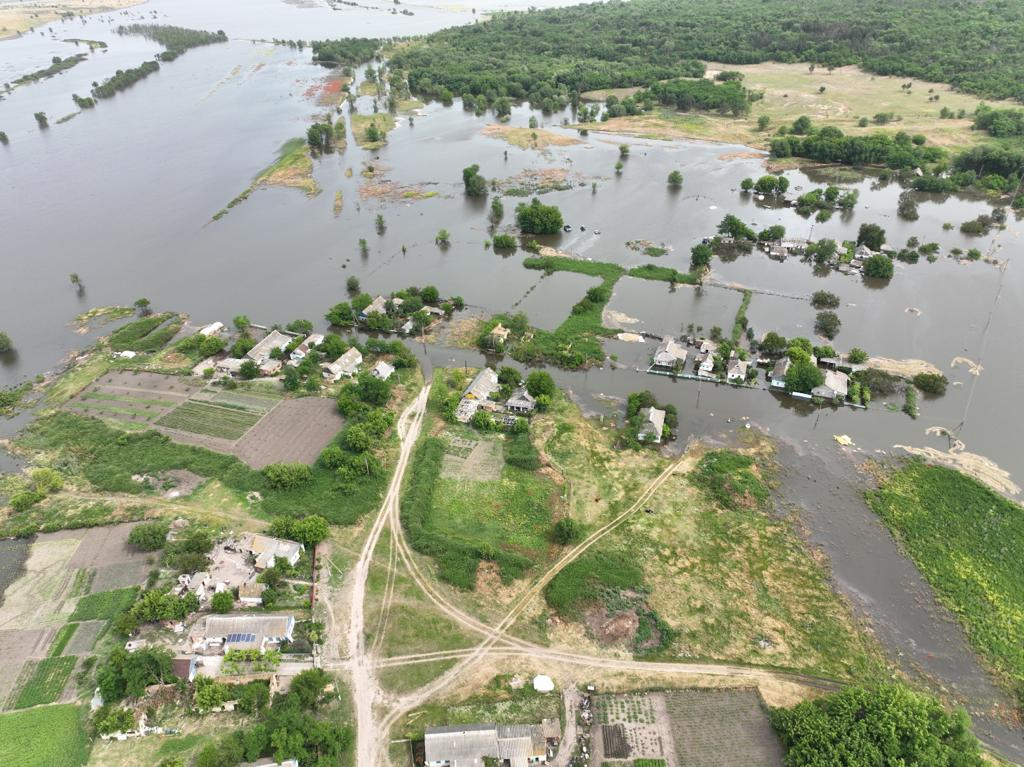
Flood in Kherson Oblast on 10 June 2023

On 6 June, Ukrainian colonel Anatolii Shtefan said that Russian forces had blown up private ponds close to the villages of Peremozhne and Hannivka in occupied Zaporizhzhia Oblast to stop an incoming Ukrainian counteroffensive in the region. Floods on fields on other villages of the area were also reported, more precisely in Petrivka, Viazivka and Yelyzavetivka, though also in others. Intentional flooding has been reported in the general area of the former Yakymivka Raion and also around the town of Tokmak.

On 7 June, Ihor Syrota, head of Ukrhydroenergo, said that it would take "at least 5 years [and] US$1 billion" to rebuild the dam. On 15 June he added that an additional year would be necessary to build upper and lower jumpers, and then dismantle the station, for a total of six years.

On 18 July, Ukrainian Prime Minister Denys Shmyhal announced the government's approval of a plan to rebuild the Hydroelectric Power Plant, which would last two years and involve two stages: designing all engineering structures and preparing the necessary base for restoration, and the construction work, which was to commence upon the removal of Russian forces from the area.

According to a study published in August 2023, in just one year a temporary dam could be constructed near the site of the destroyed dam which would allow the refilling of the reservoir to at least 12.7 m (42 ft). This would allow water to be provided to all consumers, but there would be no hydropower or shipping. (The impact of the temporary absence of hydropower would be limited, since the amount of electricity produced at the Zaporizhzhia nuclear powerplant, the Kryvyi Rih thermal powerplant and the Zaporizhzhia thermal power plant exceeds the amount that had been generated by the Kakhovka hydropower plant by more than an order of magnitude.) This would allow an additional 350,000 hectares (860,000 acres) of land to be irrigated, according to the study. At the same time, the construction of a permanent dam and hydropower plant could be started. Furthermore, according to the study, they made an error when constructing the original Kakhovka powerplant with only six hydropower units having a capacity of passing only 2,600 m^{3}/s. The new powerplant should have at least eight units and a discharge capacity of at least 4,000 m^{3}/s.

It has been reported that Rostec, a Russian state-owned defense conglomerate, plans to build 9 seawater desalination plants in Crimea by 2030, with a total capacity of about 1 billion m^{3} of freshwater per year. This is the amount of water that flowed annually to Crimea through the North Crimean Canal prior to 2014, according to a 2023 study. The problem is that these plants would require half the power generated for use by Crimea and Sevastopol in 2023. The expected cost would be ₽78 billion (US$808 million). Two such plants are planned by 2023, costing ₽7.8 billion (US$80.8 million).

On 8 June, Zelenskyy visited flooded areas of Kherson Oblast, including the city of Kherson. Reports appeared on the same day that Russia was shelling Kherson and other localities of the region as evacuation efforts continued.

On 11 June, Ukrainian media and authorities claimed that Russian forces demolished a smaller dam, near the village of Kliuchove on the Mokri Yaly river in Donetsk Oblast, to slow down Ukrainian advances.

On 13 June, Ukrainian Ministry of Defense Environmental Safety Department and Mine Action representative Major Vladyslav Dudar reported that Russian forces have placed mines at a large number of small dams in Zaporizhzhia and Kherson, and were destroying a number of them every day to disrupt Ukrainian counteroffensive operations.

On 12 June, Ukrainian intelligence claimed that Russia was mining the workshops of the Crimean Titan chemical factory in Armiansk, the explosion of which was feared to cause a major disaster. According to retired Ukrainian colonel Roman Svitan, a destruction of the factory would temporarily hinder a hypothetical Ukrainian attack into Russian-controlled Crimea unless Ukrainian troops were given chemical protection suits.

On 7 June, Turkish President Recep Tayyip Erdoğan, in separate calls with Presidents Putin and Zelenskyy, proposed an international commission to investigate the destruction of the Kakhovka dam. Erdogan said that such "a commission could be established with the participation of experts from the warring parties, the United Nations and the international community, including Turkey, for a detailed investigation into the explosion". Ukrainian Foreign Minister Dmytro Kuleba reacted negatively toward the proposal: "We have already had this experience. This is all a giveaway game with the Russians. When our prisoners of war were killed in Olenivka and we told the UN: Send your mission, let them investigate. Do you think they got there? They didn't get there. I'll tell you more: This mission was quietly shut down by the United Nations, which is called "no noise or dust". He called the proposal a "game of quasi-justice", and added, "We've already been there. It's all just a game to indulge the Russians." The reference to Olenivka was a reference to a fact-finding mission by the UN into the killing of 53 Ukrainian prisoners of war held by the Russians that was disbanded when the Russians denied access to the remaining prisoners.

The UN announced on 18 June that Russia has declined its requests to access the areas it occupied in order to deliver humanitarian aid. The UN urged the Russian authorities to act in accordance with their obligations under international humanitarian law. According to defense analyst Edward Stringer, the reasons for this Russian refusal appear to be that

(a) Russians have shown no interest in helping Ukrainian civilians (quite the opposite, he said), and
(b) Russians don't want outside eyes into that area since there are credible reports that they are using the flooding as a defense, and so are moving some of the troops that were positioned there away further to the east, to those areas where they are expecting the main thrust of the Ukrainian counteroffensive.

== See also ==
- International sanctions during the Russian invasion of Ukraine
- Attacks on civilians in the Russian invasion of Ukraine
- Impact of the Russian invasion of Ukraine on nuclear power plants
- Environmental impact of the Russian invasion of Ukraine
- Deliberate Soviet dam destruction in Ukraine during World War II
- Scorched earth
- Destruction of the Kozarovytska Dam in 2022, flooding Demydiv

=== Similar international events ===
- 1642 Yellow River flood
- 1914 inundation on the Yser in Flanders during World War I
- 1938 Yellow River flood, a similar human-made wartime river flood
- 1943 Operation Chastise, Allied attack on German dams during World War II
- 1945 Dutch floods during World War II
- 1952 attack on the Sui-ho Dam
- 2014 Battle for Mosul Dam, during the War in Iraq (2013–2017)
- Itaipu Dam, caused concern that in times of conflict could be used as a weapon to flood Buenos Aires
- Proposed bombing of Vietnam's dikes

=== General ===
- List of hydroelectric power station failures
