= Artem Chornomorov =

Ukrainian politician

- Артем Чорноморов
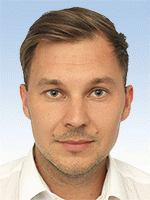
- Official portrait, 2019

People's Deputy of Ukraine
- Incumbent
- Assumed office 29 August 2019
- Preceded by: Oleksandr Livik
- Constituency: Mykolaiv Oblast, No. 131

Personal details
- Born: 10 March 1988 (age 38) Yuzhnoukrainsk, Ukrainian SSR, Soviet Union (now Ukraine)
- Party: Servant of the People
- Other political affiliations: Independent
- Education: National Aviation University

Artem Olehovych Chornomorov (Ukrainian: Артем Олегович Чорноморов; born 10 March 1988) is a Ukrainian politician currently serving as a People's Deputy of Ukraine representing Ukraine's 131st electoral district as a member of Servant of the People since 2019.

== Early life and career ==
Artem Olehovych Chornomorov was born on 10 March 1988 in the city of Yuzhnoukrainsk in southwestern Ukraine. He is a graduate of the National Aviation University, specialising in logistics management. Prior to his election as a People's Deputy of Ukraine, Chornomorov worked in agricultural training. He was founder and chair of SmartAhri TOV, a company responsible for training people in the agricultural field.

== Political career ==
In the 2019 Ukrainian parliamentary election, Chornomorov was the candidate of Servant of the People for the position of People's Deputy of Ukraine in Ukraine's 131st electoral district, located in Mykolaiv Oblast. At the time of the election, he was an independent. He was successfully elected, defeating his next-closest opponent, independent Anatoliy Hasiuk, with 43.36% of the vote to Hasiuk's 10.47% (independent incumbent People's Deputy Oleksandr Livik placed 10th, with 2.56% of the vote).

In the Verkhovna Rada (Ukraine's national parliament), Chornomorov joined the Servant of the People faction, as well as the Southern Ukraine and For FOPs inter-factional associations and the Verkhovna Rada Committee on Agrarian and Land Policy. In his 2019 income declaration, Chornomorov stated ₴2.5 million in monetary assets, despite the fact that he rented housing for People's Deputies.

In 2022, Chornomorov was one of the signatories of an appeal sent to Verkhovna Rada Chairman Ruslan Stefanchuk by People's Deputies to deprive all members of pro-Russian parties of their seats in the Verkhovna Rada and local governments. The same year, he voted in support of urban planning reform, a move criticised by anti-corruption non-governmental organisation Chesno. Chesno has claimed that the urban planning reforms pushed by the Verkhovna Rada would take power over reconstruction following the Russo-Ukrainian War from local governments and put it into the hands of real estate developers.
