= Bombing of North Vietnam =

Articles about the Bombings of North Vietnam during the Vietnam War include:

- Proposed bombing of Vietnam's dikes
- Operation Rolling Thunder, 1965–1968
- Operation Linebacker, May–October 1972
- Operation Linebacker II, December 1972
