= Kherson strikes (2022–present) =

Russian missile strikes in Kherson, Ukraine

- Part of Battle of Kherson
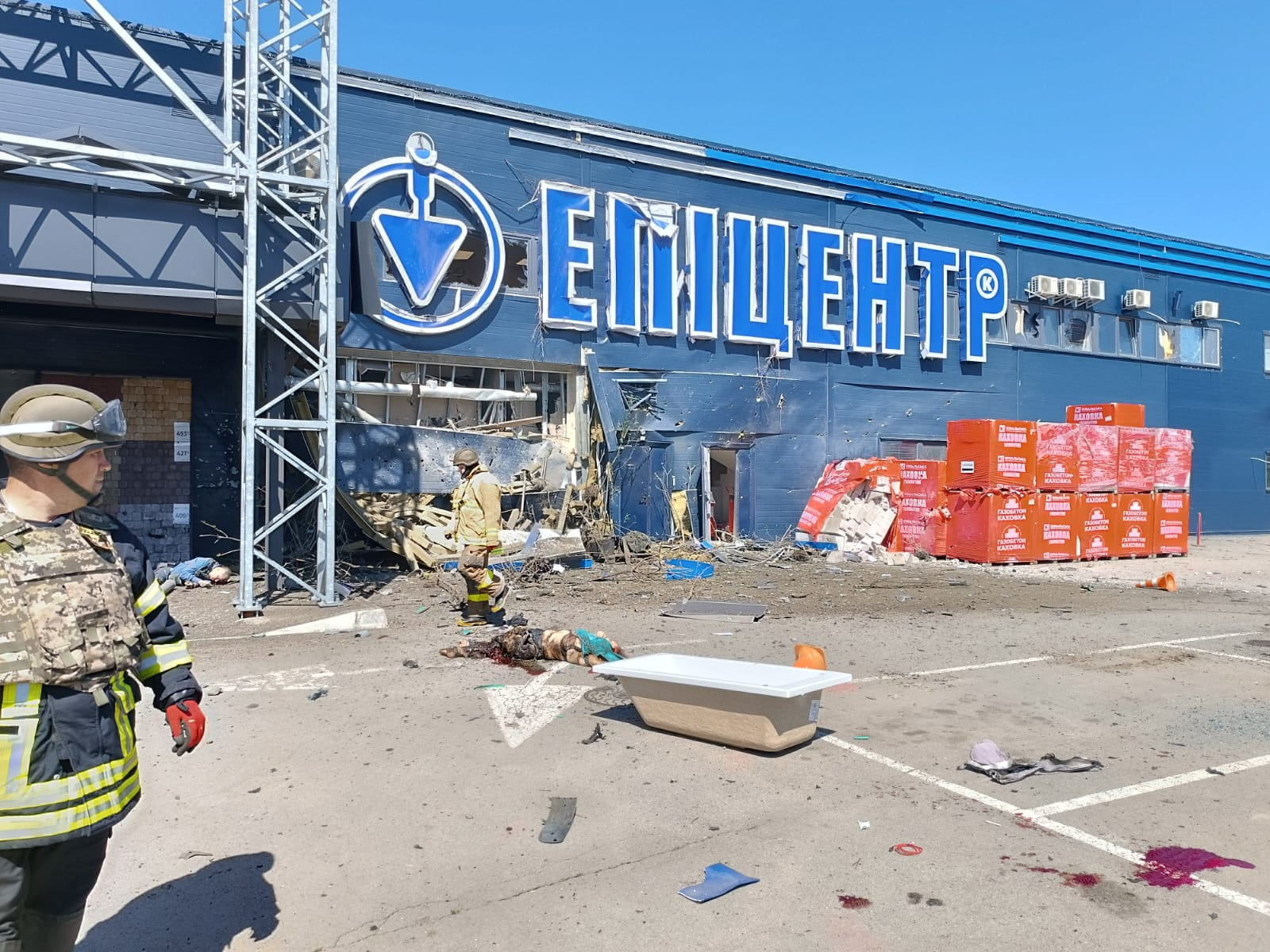
- Epitsentr hypermarket in Kherson after the shelling on 3 May 2023
- Location: Kherson, Ukraine
- Date: November 2022 – present
- Attack type: Missile strikes
- Deaths: 24 (3 May 2023)
- Injuries: 45 (3 May 2023)
- Perpetrator: Russian Armed Forces

Throughout the Russian invasion of Ukraine, the city of Kherson has been shelled multiple times. These attacks intensified following the liberation of Kherson.

== Shelling of 3 May 2023 ==
In the Korabelny district, the Russians fired at the only working Epitsentr hypermarket in the city, in the center of the city, the ATB supermarket, the OKKO gas station, a hardware store, residential buildings, a factory and a railway station came under fire. During the day, 539 shells were fired at the city from artillery, tanks, BM-21 Grad, UAVs and aviation.

In addition, several other settlements in the region were shelled. In particular, three energy workers were killed near the village of Stepanivka, and a local resident died in his own yard in Tokarivka.

As of the morning of the next day, it was known that around 23 dead and another 46 wounded in Kherson and the region, including two children. On May 8, one of the wounded died in hospital, bringing the death toll to 24.

The President of Ukraine, Volodymyr Zelenskyy, published a photo with the consequences of the attack on himself in the Telegram channel, writing:

The world must see and know this. A train station and transfer station, a house, a hardware store, a grocery store, a gas station - do you know what these places have in common? The bloody trail left by Russia with its shells, killing civilians in Kherson and the Kherson region. As of now, 21 people have died! 48 wounded! All civilians! In one incomplete day! In one area! My condolences to the families and loved ones of the victims. We will never forgive the guilty. Let's defeat the evil country and make all the guilty answer!

The head of the Kherson regional state administration Oleksandr Prokudin announced the announcement of a long curfew in Kherson from Friday evening until Monday morning. In addition, the regional military administration announced three days of mourning on May 4, 5 and 6, starting at 12 noon on May 4.

== Attacks following the destruction of the Kakhovka Dam ==
On 8 June 2023, Russia shelled Kherson and other localities of the region as evacuation efforts following the destruction of the Kakhovka Dam continued. Zelenskyy visited Kherson and other flooded areas of Kherson Oblast on the same day.
