= Mykolaivka, Beryslav Raion, Kherson Oblast =

Settlement in Kherson Oblast, Ukraine

Mykolaivka Миколаївка
- Location in Ukraine Mykolaivka (Ukraine)
- Coordinates: 46°47′23″N 33°15′10″E
- Country: Ukraine
- Oblast: Kherson Oblast
- Raion: Beryslav Raion
- Hromada: Tiahynka rural hromada
- Time zone: UTC+2 (EET)
  - Summer (DST): UTC+3 (EEST)
- Postal code: 74342

Mykolaivka (Ukrainian: Миколаївка) is a village in Beryslav Raion, Kherson Oblast, Ukraine. It was flooded as a result of the destruction of the Kakhovka Dam. Prior to the Russian invasion, according to the 2001 Ukrainian Census, the village's population was 858 people in an area of 0.958 km2.

== History ==
The village was founded in 1817. It was named after the Orthodox saint Saint Nicholas. However, another version also states that it is named after the landowner who brought some peasants to the village, Mykola Zhuravsky. Either way, it was founded by settlers from Burhunka in May on the Polovtsian steppe near the Kozaki. During the Great Patriotic War, the village was occupied by German troops from 21 August 1941 to 11 March 1944.

Previously, the village was part of the Odradokamyanka Village Council, until it became part of Tiahynka rural hromada. It was flooded as a result of the Russian destruction of the Kakhovka Dam during the Russian invasion of Ukraine. However, despite it being flooded, Russian troops have continued to hit the village with multiple launch rocket systems, with no injuries.

== Demographics ==
According to the 2001 Ukrainian Census, the only official census taken in post-independence Ukraine, the population of the village was 858 people. Of the people residing in the village, their mother tongue is as follows:

Language	Percentage of Population
Ukrainian	85.20%
Russian	14.57%
Other	0.23%

== Monuments ==
There was a monument to soldiers who died in battle for the "freedom and independence of the Motherland." There is also a Church of Theodore Tiron of the Ukrainian Orthodox Church.
