= Oleksandr Livik =

Ukrainian politician

Oleksandr Livik Олександр Лівік
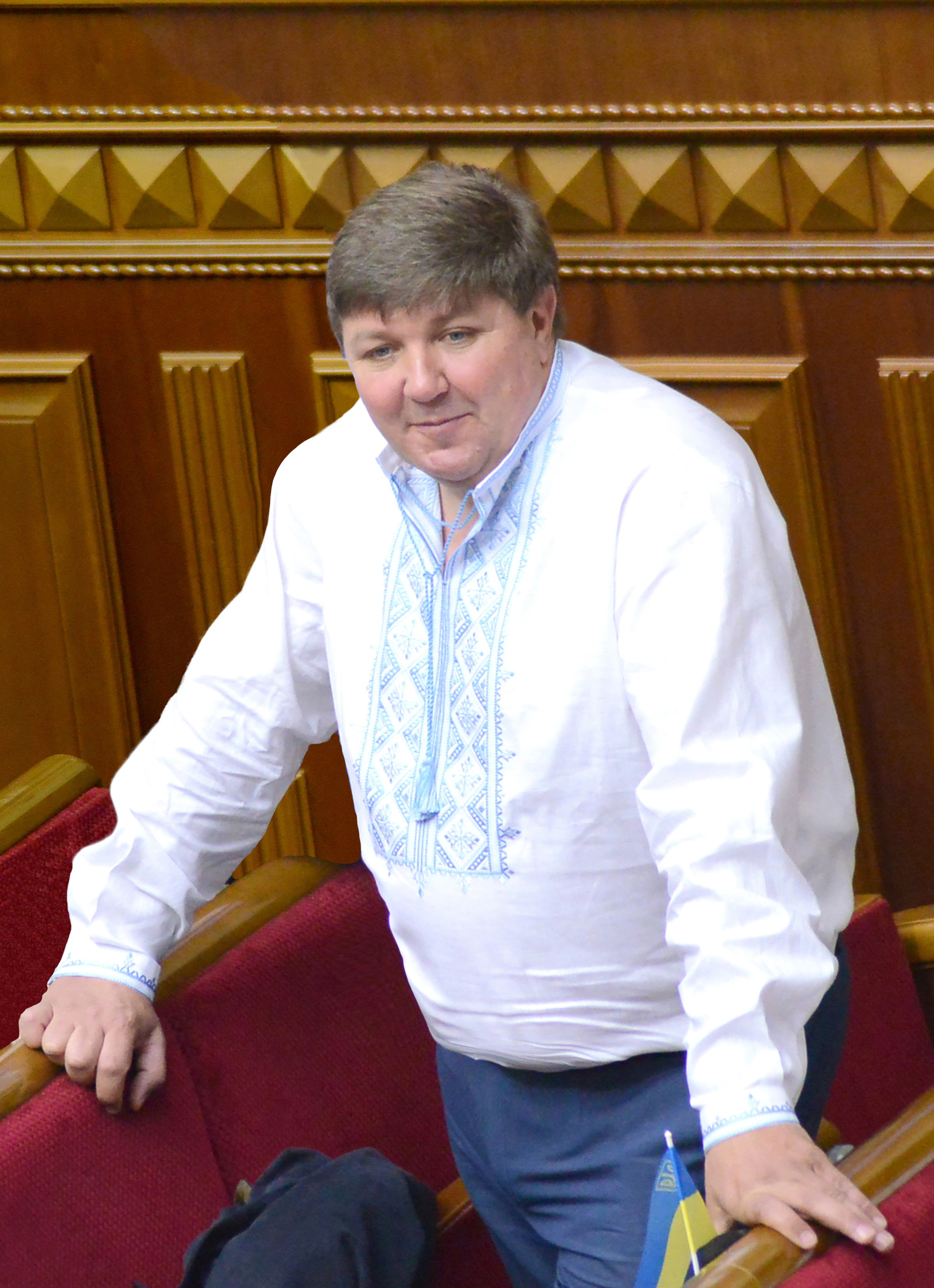

Personal details
- Born: 30 June 1970 (age 56) Mykolaiv, Ukrainian SSR
- Party: Petro Poroshenko Bloc
- Education: Mykolayiv State Agrarian University

Oleksandr Petrovych Livik (UA, Лівік Олександр Петрович;) born on June 30, 1970, Mykolaiv Ukrainian SSR — is a Ukrainian politician, and People's deputy of Ukraine of the VIII convocation

== Education ==
- 1987 — 1992 — Kyiv High Tank Engineer College after Marshal Yakubovskyi, cadet;
- 1992 — 1996 — Kyiv Institute of Ground Forces, a director of software group;
- In 2009 graduated from the Institute of Post-Graduate Education of Lviv Commerce Academy, specialist in finances.
- In 2013 he got a PhD Degree in Economic Science in Mykolayiv National Agrarian University of Ministry of Agrarian Policy and Food of Ukraine

== Career ==
- 1996 — 1999 — a deputy director of LTD «Fagot»;
- 1999 — 2001 — a director of LTD «Fagot»;
- 2001 — 2008 — a deputy president, a director of wine-cognac plant LTD «Zelenyi Gai»;
- Since 2002 — was elected a deputy of Mykolayiv Region Council.
- Since 2007 — a vive-president of All Ukraine Conference of winemakers and gardeners, a president of Mykolayiv Regional Football Federation for Children and Youth, President Emeritus*** of Voznesensk Regional Children's Sport Public Organization "Football Club «Gelenyi Gai».
- Since 2008 — a deputy director of the Chairman of Executive Board (vice-president) LTD «Zelenyi Gai».
- 2010 — 2014 — a deputy of Mykolaiv Regional Council.
- November 27, 2014 — people's deputy of Ukraine of the VIII convocation, party "Petro Poroshenko Bloc”,

Chairperson of the subcommittee on alternative and renewable energy sources of the Verkhovna Rada of Ukraine Committee on Fuel and Energy Complex, Nuclear Policy and Nuclear Safety

== Family ==
Married, has a son.
