= Yaroslav Yanushevych =

Ukrainian politician

- Ярослав Янушевич

Governor of Kherson Oblast (Note: Control over Kherson Oblast is disputed with Vladimir Saldo due to the 2022 Russian invasion of Ukraine. Saldo was installed by Russia on 4 October 2022, while Yanushevych was recognized by the Ukrainian government. He was replaced by Oleksandr Prokudin on 24 January 2023.)
- In office 3 August 2022 – 24 January 2023
- President: Volodymyr Zelenskyy
- Preceded by: Hennadiy Lahuta; Dmytro Butriy (acting)
- Succeeded by: Oleksandr Prokudin

Personal details
- Born: 7 February 1978 (age 48) Kiev, Ukrainian SSR, Soviet Union
- Party: Servant of the People
- Education: Taras Shevchenko National University of Kyiv, Odesa University, National Academy for Public Administration

Yaroslav Volodymyrovych Yanushevych (Ukrainian: Ярослав Володимирович Янушевич, born 7 February 1978) is a Ukrainian economist, civil servant, scholar, and athlete. He is an Honored Economist of Ukraine, Candidate of Economic Sciences, and Doctor of Law. He is also a world champion in paintball in the 40+ category.

He holds the rank of Civil Servant of the 3rd class.

From 3 August 2022 to 24 January 2023, he was the Head of the Kherson Regional State Administration and the Head of the Kherson Regional Military Administration.

== Biography ==
=== Education ===
In 2000, he graduated with honors from Taras Shevchenko National University of Kyiv, specializing in Finance, and received a Master’s degree in Economics.

From 2001 to 2009, he was a postgraduate student at the Institute for Economics and Forecasting of the National Academy of Sciences of Ukraine.

In 2009, he graduated from I.I. Mechnikov Odesa National University with a degree in Law and received the qualification of a lawyer, as well as from the National Academy for Public Administration under the President of Ukraine with a degree in Public Development Management, earning a Master’s degree in Public Development Management.

In 2019, he also participated in an international training module under the MIM Business School program in the People’s Republic of China at the China Europe International Business School (CEIBS).

In 2021, he completed the Senior Executive Master of Business Administration (SE MBA) program for business owners and top-level executives at the International Institute of Management.

In 2023, he completed a research and teaching internship at a higher education institution: Cuiavian University in Wloclawek (Poland).

In 2024, he completed and successfully graduated from the course «Leadership and Organizational Management in Times of Crisis» course in Brussels, Belgium.

In 2009, he earned a PhD in Economics, and in 2021, a Doctor of Laws degree. In 2023, he was awarded the academic title of Associate Professor.

=== Career ===
Yaroslav Yanushevych began his professional career in April 1996 in the state tax authorities, progressing from tax inspector to department director.

From April 2003 to March 2014, he held senior positions in central executive bodies, including:

- Deputy Head of the State Financial Monitoring Service, Ministry of Finance of Ukraine
- Deputy Head of the State Committee for Financial Monitoring of Ukraine
- Deputy Head of the State Tax Service of Ukraine
- Deputy Head of the Tax Policy, State Tax Service of Ukraine
- Deputy Head of the State Migration Service of Ukraine
- Deputy Head of the State Financial Inspection of Ukraine

He also gained experience in managing state enterprises and banking institutions.

While leading the State Enterprise «Document», he established modern European-style «Passport Service» centers. From September 2014 to April 2016, he served as Executive Director of the Ukrainian State Center of Radio Frequencies.

On 3 August 2022, Yaroslav Yanushevych was appointed Head of the Kherson Regional State Administration. He was dismissed from this position on 24 January 2023 by order of the President of Ukraine.

=== Teaching experience ===
- Associate Professor, Department of Banking and Financial Monitoring, National State Tax Service University of Ukraine (September 2010 – June 2014)
- Associate Professor, Department of Finance, Banking, and Insurance, Educational and Scientific Institute of Management, Economics, and Finance, Private Higher Educational Institution «Interregional Academy of Personnel Management» (March 2021 – present)

=== Sports ===
Yaroslav Yanushevych is the founder and captain of the Ukrainian paintball team «Hulk», which won the Ukrainian Championship and earned a silver medal at the World Cup.

In 2019, he became a world champion in paintball in the 40+ category, serving as captain and playing coach of the Ukrainian national team.

== Awards and honors ==
- Full Cavalier of the Order of Merit: 3rd Class (2012), 2nd Class (2016), 1st Class (2020)
- Honored Economist of Ukraine (2004)
- Honorary Diploma of the Verkhovna Rada of Ukraine
- Honorary Diploma of the Cabinet of Ministers of Ukraine
- Various departmental awards from the State Tax Service of Ukraine, the State Committee for Financial Monitoring of Ukraine, the Ministry of Internal Affairs of Ukraine, the Main Intelligence Directorate of the Ministry of Defense of Ukraine, the Administration of the State Border Guard Service of Ukraine, the Foreign Intelligence Service of Ukraine, and the Security Service of Ukraine

== Leadership after the Liberation of the Right-Bank Kherson Region ==
After the liberation of the right-bank Kherson region from Russian occupation, Yaroslav Yanushevych was the first to arrive in the city and organized the restoration of key infrastructure, communications, medical, and social services destroyed by the occupiers

He is also known for his active international communication efforts as Head of the Kherson Regional State Administration. He regularly provided commentary on the situation in Kherson Region for leading foreign media outlets, including Le Monde, Reuters, Euronews, Deutsche Welle, The Journal (Ireland), TVN24, and others. His statements and interviews highlighted the consequences of Russian shelling, the humanitarian situation, evacuation processes, and demining efforts in liberated territories.
