= Oleksandr Prokudin =

Ukrainian politician

- Олександр Прокудін
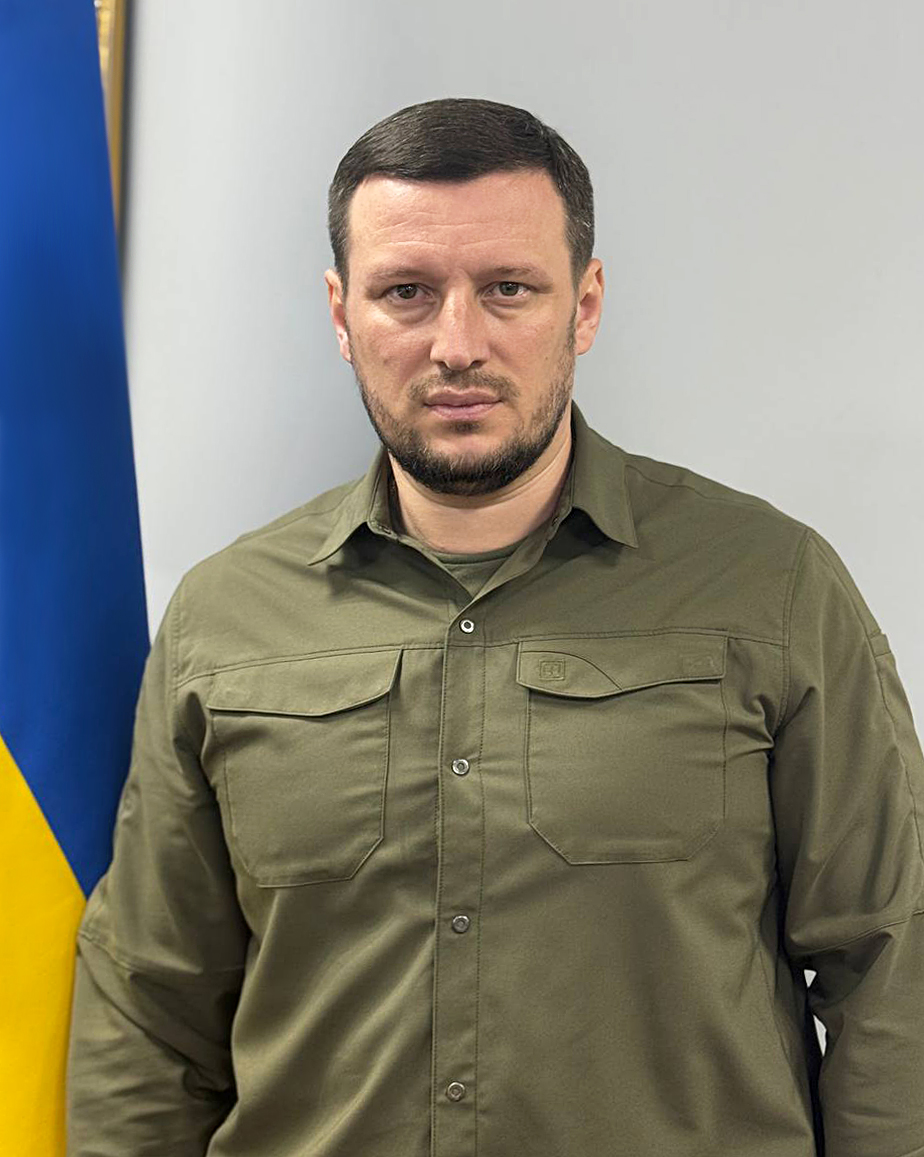
- Prokudin in 2025

Governor of Kherson Oblast
- Disputed (Note: Control over Kherson Oblast is disputed with Vladimir Saldo due to the 2022 Russian invasion of Ukraine. Saldo was installed by Russia on 4 October 2022, while Prokudin is the incumbent governor as recognized by the Ukrainian government. His predecessor is Yaroslav Yanushevych.)
- Assumed office 7 February 2023
- Preceded by: Yaroslav Yanushevych

Personal details
- Born: 22 July 1983 (age 43) Nikolayev, Ukrainian SSR, Soviet Union
- Spouse: Anastasiia Prokudina
- Education: Mykolaiv National Agrarian University, National Academy of Internal Affairs

Oleksandr Serhiyovych Prokudin (Ukrainian: Олександр Сергійович Прокудін; born 22 July 1983) is a Ukrainian civil servant. He has served as the head of the Kherson Regional Military Administration since 7 February 2023.

== Professional experience ==
Since 2000, he has worked in investigative units and the professional training office of the Human Resources Department.

Since November 2015, he has served as Deputy Head of the Chief Administration of the National Police of the Kherson region.

From September 2019 to February 2022, he was Head of the Chief Administration of the National Police of the Kherson region. He served as the Head of the Department of the National Police of Ukraine (from February 2022 to 7 February 2023).

On 7 February 2023, the President of Ukraine Volodymyr Zelenskyy appointed Oleksandr Prokudin as Head of the Kherson Regional Military Administration (KRMA) by Decree № 67/2023.

He graduated from Mykolaiv National Agrarian University and the National Academy of Internal Affairs. He has a PhD in Law.

=== Consequences of the Russian terrorist attack on the Kakhovka Hydroelectric Power Plant ===
On the morning of 6 June 2023, Russian forces destroyed the dam of the Kakhovka Hydroelectric Power Plant.

Oleksandr Prokudin was one of those who led the rescue operation in the flooded areas of the liberated right-bank part of the region.

According to the United Nations, the destruction of the Kakhovka Hydroelectric Power Plant dam caused nearly 14 billion dollars in damages to Ukraine, further worsening the already catastrophic consequences of Russia's full-scale invasion.

== International cooperation ==
During his tenure, Oleksandr Prokudin has carried out a number of international visits: at the end of 2024, he visited Canada, Belgium, Germany, and the Netherlands, and at the beginning of 2025 – the United Kingdom, Italy, and Lithuania.

In particular, during his visit to Canada, Oleksandr Prokudin participated in "Rebuild Ukraine", where he was a speaker at the panel discussion "Joint efforts for Ukraine's reconstruction".

He also visited the University of Toronto campus to establish a partnership between the University of Toronto and one of the Ukrainian universities.

In Germany, during a meeting with the Minister President of the Schleswig-Holstein federal state, Daniel Günther, agreements were reached to provide the Kherson region with 500,000 euros for equipping critical infrastructure with solar panels.

In the Seimas of Lithuania, Oleksandr Prokudin participated in the international conference "Lithuania for Ukraine", during which he spoke about the challenges the Kherson region faces daily.

During a meeting with the President of the Italian region of Liguria, Marco Bucci, Oleksandr Prokudin signed an agreement, outlining the expansion of cooperation. Additionally, the intentions for collaboration formed the basis of a document on cooperation between the cities of La Spezia and Kherson.

During his visit to England, the head of the Kherson Regional Military Administration signed a memorandum of cooperation in the field of agriculture with Lincolnshire.

During his visit to London, Oleksandr Prokudin gave an interview about the situation in Ukraine and the Kherson Oblast to four leading global media outlets: The Times, The Guardian, The Independent, and The Telegraph.

In an interview with The Independent, Oleksandr Prokudin emphasized the need to share the military and civilian experience gained by the Kherson region during the war with Russia to strengthen and modernize the defense of European countries' borders.

On 29 October 2025, Oleksandr Prokudin took part in the 49th session of the Congress of Local and Regional Authorities of the Council of Europe, where he presented to the participants a program titled "Civil-Military Administration in Conditions of Modern War".

In early November 2025, during a visit to Estonia, he signed a Memorandum of Understanding between the Kherson region and Hiiumaa County.

In addition, in the city of Tartu (Republic of Estonia), he presented the experience of the Kherson region in the field of civil-military administration, crisis management, and community resilience.

During his stay in Latvia, the head of the Kherson RMA signed a Letter of Intent to cooperate with the head of the Latvian municipality of Mārupe, Aivars Ositis.

He also presented the experience of the Kherson region at a meeting of the Defence Committee of the Saeima of Latvia.

On 10 February 2026, Oleksandr Prokudin signed a Memorandum of Cooperation with Loïg Chesnais-Girard, President of the Regional Council of Brittany (French Republic).

On 13 February 2026, on behalf of the President of Ukraine, Volodymyr Zelenskyy, he took part in the Munich Security Conference and the round table "Wartime Recovery and Resilience: Lessons from Ukraine's Front Lines", where he presented the experience of the Kherson region.

On 16–17 February 2026, the head of the Kherson Regional Military Administration, Oleksandr Prokudin, presented the Kherson region's experience in the federal state of Schleswig-Holstein (Federal Republic of Germany),,.

In 2025, the American think tank Hudson Institute published an article, "What NATO countries can learn from the Kherson Regional Military Administration", in which Oleksandr Prokudin commented on the experience of managing the region after de-occupation.

On 26 May 2026, during the IV International Summit of Cities and Regions, Oleksandr Prokudin, on behalf of the Kherson region, signed Protocols of Intent to cooperate with the regions of Vestfold (Kingdom of Norway) and Ostrobothnia (Republic of Finland).

Oleksandr Prokudin constantly provides comments and interviews to leading international media in which he covers the security situation in the Kherson region, the "human safari" and emphasizes the need to prepare states and regions for modern security challenges,.

On 24 June 2026, during the Ukraine Recovery Conference 2026, Oleksandr Prokudin presented Unbreakable Kherson, a practical guide documenting the Kherson region's experience in crisis management during Russia's full-scale invasion of Ukraine. The publication was developed on his initiative in collaboration with Oleksandr Tolokonnikov, with the support of Howard G. Buffett and the German Marshall Fund.

== Assassination attempts ==
Prokudin survived several assassination attempts organized by Russian special services. One of them was prevented by the Security Service of Ukraine in April 2024. Counterintelligence detained an agent of Russian military intelligence who, disguised as a taxi driver, spied on civilian and military targets in the Kherson region. It was established that, based on agent's coordinates and hits, the services attempted to target the KRMA head's car with an FPV drone.

== Personal life ==
He is married to Anastasiia Prokudina, and has two daughters.
