= Bilohrudove =

Bilohrudove Білогрудове
- Village
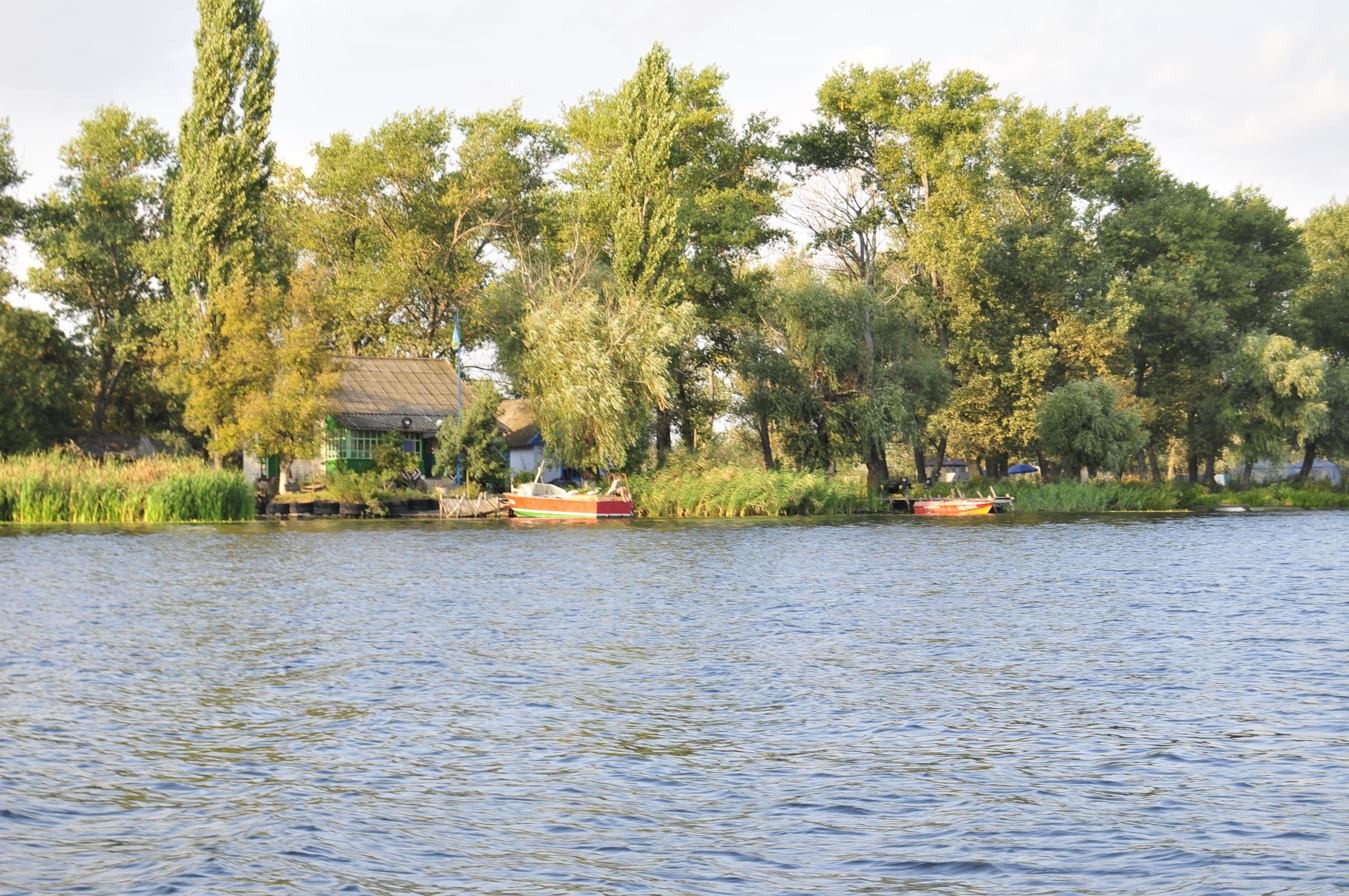
- A water-rescue station on Bilohrudyi Island
- Interactive map of Bilohrudove
- Location of Bilohrudove within Kherson Oblast Bilohrudove (Ukraine)
- Coordinates: 46.550°N 32.523°E
- Country: Ukraine
- Oblast: Kherson Oblast
- Raion: Skadovsk Raion
- Hromada: Hola Prystan urban hromada
- Founded: 1910

Population (2001)
  - Total: 275
- Time zone: UTC+2
  - Summer (DST): UTC+3 (EEST)
- Postal code: 75604
- Area code: +380 5539

Bilohrudove (Ukrainian: Білогрудове) is a village (selo) in Skadovsk Raion, Kherson Oblast, Ukraine. It belongs to the Hola Prystan urban hromada, one of the hromadas of Ukraine. The village is located 5 km. south of Kherson City on Bilohrudyi Island (Ukrainian: Білогрудий острів), one of the islands of the Dnieper delta.

== History ==
Bilohrudove was occupied by Russia at the beginning of its invasion of Ukraine in late February 2022.

The village was completely flooded when the Kakhovka Dam was destroyed on 6 June 2023.

Bilohrudyi Island (including Bilohrudove) was reportedly liberated by Ukrainian forces in late June 2023. On November 11 heavy fighting was reported to be ongoing on the island as the battle for control of the Dnipro continued.

== Demographics ==
According to the 1989 Soviet census, the population of Bilohrudove was 273, of which 131 were men and 142 were women.

According to the 2001 Ukrainian census, the village had a population of 275. 92.49% of residents were native Ukrainian speakers, 7.17% were native Russian speakers, and the remaining 0.34% were native Belarusian speakers.
