= Time in Ukraine =

Time in Europe: Light Blue / Western European Time / Greenwich Mean Time (UTC); Blue / Western European Time / Greenwich Mean Time (UTC); Blue / Western European Summer Time / British Summer Time / Irish Standard Time (UTC+1); Red / Central European Time (UTC+1); Red / Central European Summer Time (UTC+2); Yellow / Eastern European Time / Kaliningrad Time (UTC+2); Ochre / Eastern European Time (UTC+2); Ochre / Eastern European Summer Time (UTC+3); Green / Moscow Time / Turkey Time (UTC+3); Turquoise / Armenia Time / Azerbaijan Time / Georgia Time / Samara Time (UTC+4); ▉▉▉▉ Pale hues: Standard time observed all year ▉▉▉ Dark hues: Daylight saving time

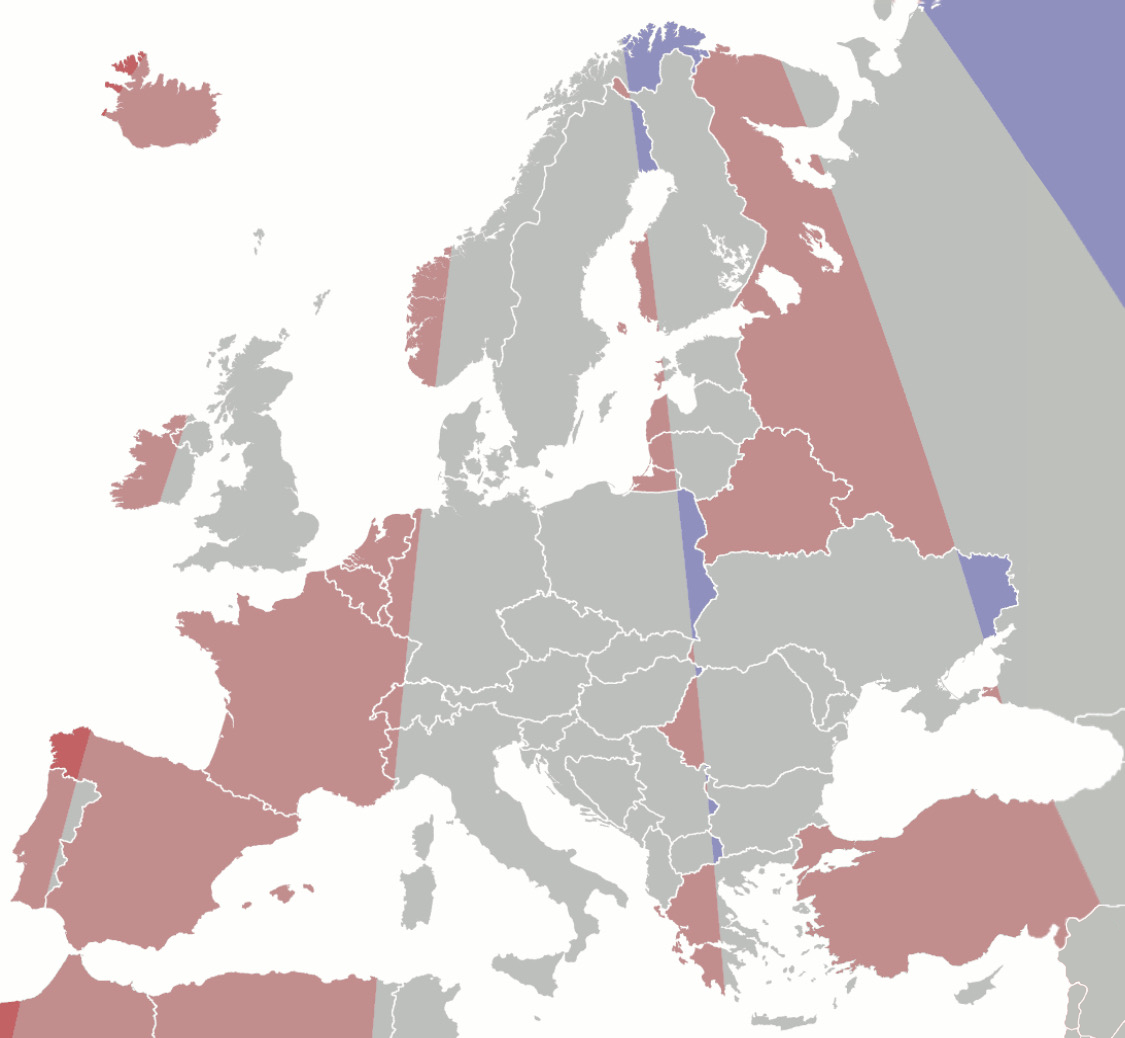
This map shows the difference between legal time and local mean time in Europe during the winter. Most of Western Europe and western part of European Russia are significantly ahead of local solar time.: Color / Legal time vs local mean time; / 1 h ± 30 m behind; / 0 h ± 30 m; / 1 h ± 30 m ahead; / 2 h ± 30 m ahead

Time in Ukraine, part of the Eastern European Time zone (UTC+02:00), is locally referred to as Kyiv Time (Ukrainian: Київський час, romanized: Kyivskyi chas).

On 16 July 2024, the Ukrainian parliament voted to cease observing daylight saving time. The president of Ukraine, Volodymyr Zelenskyy, however, did not plan to sign it.

== Geographical description ==
The territory of Ukraine in Europe stretches 17°57' along a longitude or about 1.2 hours. Almost 95% of its territory is located in the Eastern European Time Zone with exceptions of its western and eastern extremities. Small portion of Zakarpattia Oblast is located in the Central European Time Zone, while Luhansk Oblast, most of Donetsk Oblast, and part of Kharkiv Oblast are geographically located in the Further-eastern European Time Zone. However, the whole country officially observes Eastern European Time.

- Eastern extremity: village of Chervona Zirka (Velykotsk council), Milove Raion, Luhansk Oblast - 40°11′53″ (eastern longitude)
- Western extremity: village of Solomonovo, Uzhhorod Raion, Zakarpattia Oblast - 22°09′50″ (eastern longitude)
- Vernadsky Research Base in Antarctic is located in the Atlantic Time Zone (UTC-04:00).

== History ==
Daylight saving time in Ukraine was introduced in the early 1980s. On 20 September 2011, the Verkhovna Rada (Ukrainian parliament) canceled the return from Eastern European Summer Time to Eastern European Time. On 18 October 2011, the Parliament abolished these plans. On 16 July 2024, Ukraine canceled the switch from Eastern European Time to Eastern European Summer Time. On 29 March 2014, after annexation by Russia, Crimea switched from Eastern European Time (UTC+02:00) to Moscow Time (UTC+04:00 then, subsequently changed to UTC+03:00). On 26 October 2014, the self-proclaimed proto-states of Donetsk People's Republic and Luhansk People's Republic also switched to Moscow Time.

== IANA time zone database ==
The IANA time zone database contains four zones for Ukraine in the file zone.tab:

- Europe/Kyiv – most locations
- Europe/Uzhgorod – Ruthenia (because it used Central European Time in 1990/1991)
- Europe/Zaporozhye – Zaporizhzhia and Luhansk Oblast
- Europe/Simferopol – central Crimea

== See also ==
- Date and time notation in Ukraine
