= Date and time notation in Ukraine =

In Ukraine, dates are usually written in "day month year" (DMY) order. This order is used in both the all-numeric date (for example "27.05.19") and the expanded form (for example "27 травня 2019 р."; the trailing "р." is short for "рік" ("year"). Single-digit numbers for day or month usually have a preceding zero (for example "27.05.2019"). When saying the date, it is usually pronounced using the ordinal number of the day first, then the month (for example "двадцять сьомого травня"). Monday is the first day of the week.

For time, 24-hour notation is used almost exclusively, with a colon as the standardized and recommended separator (e.g. 18:56). In spoken or informal Ukrainian, 12-hour notation may be used, but is not recommended. In general, no AM/PM specification is used, so this information is expected to be gained from context. Another difference from English is that half-hours are counted up to next hour: "половина восьмої", literally “half of the eighth” means 7:30, not 8:30.
