= Proposed bombing of North Vietnamese dikes =

Considered by the U.S. in the Vietnam War

During the Vietnam War, the U.S. Joint Chiefs of Staff considered and rejected some additions to strategic bombing campaigns that would include targeting a series of dikes and dams along Vietnam's Red River delta. In 1972, Secretary of State Henry Kissinger estimated the casualties from flooding at 200,000 people. A classified 1965 USAF report suggested that the Red River flood control system could probably not be destroyed by conventional aerial bombing.

In 1966, John McNaughton, Secretary of Defense for International Security Affairs, proposed the destruction of the Red River Valley dams and dikes in order to flood rice paddies, disrupt the North Vietnamese food supply, and leverage Hanoi during negotiations; then-Secretary of Defense Robert McNamara, however, rejected the idea.

In spring 1965, Zhou Enlai, the premier of the People's Republic of China, signaled to the US that the bombing of dikes constituted a red line for his country, and would trigger unrestricted retaliation from Chinese forces.

== Background ==
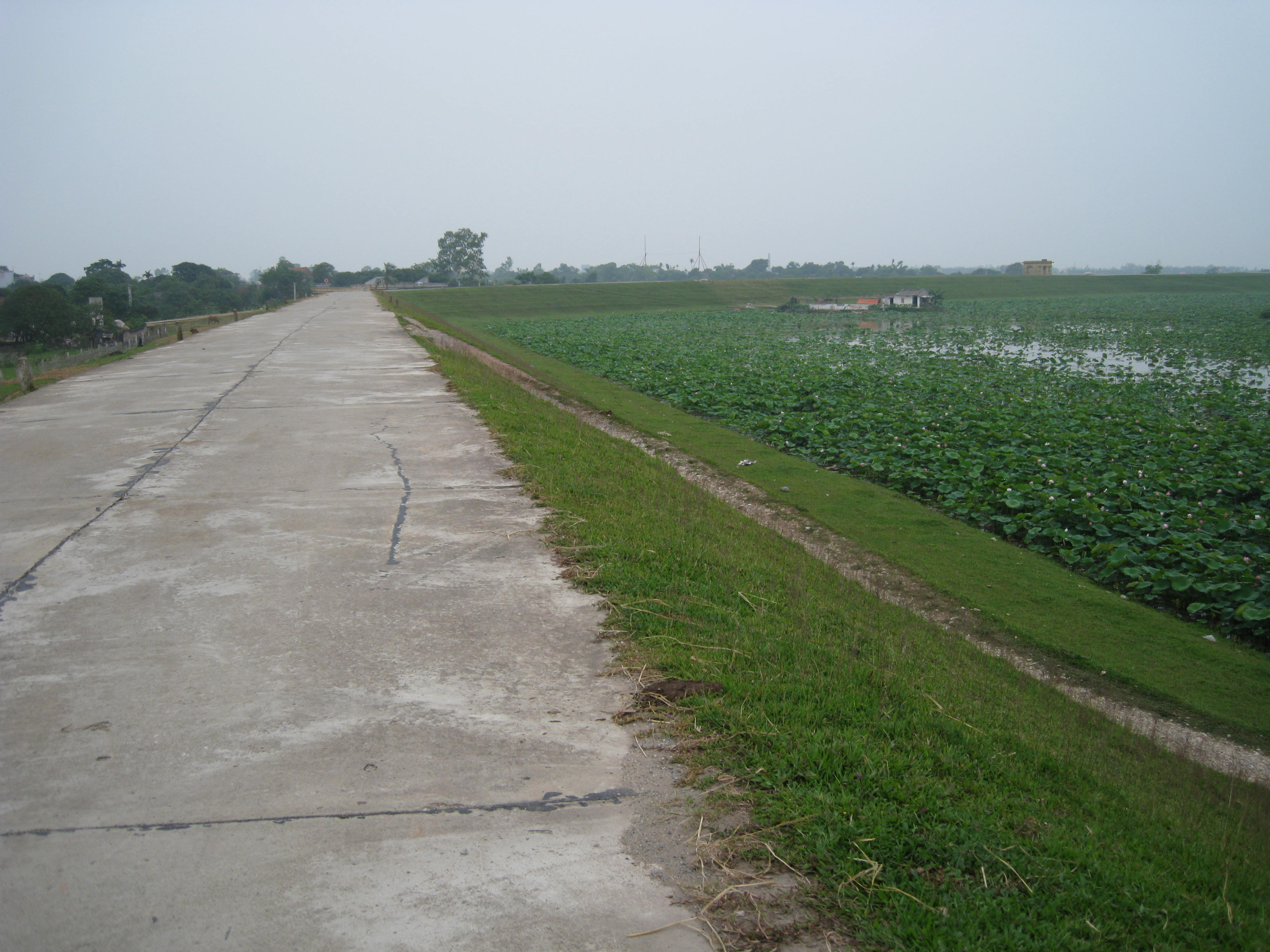
Red River dike, 2009

The dike and dam system on the Red River Plain date back to the third century BCE when it was occupied by the rice-farming Lạc Việt tribe. In 1108, Vietnamese king Lý Nhân Tông ordered the construction of Đê Cơ Xá east of Thăng Long along the Red River to protect the city from flooding. Under the Tran dynasty, construction of dikes along the Red River all the way to the coast were hastened. In 1248, king Trần Thái Tông ordered the construction of Dỉnh Nhỉ Đê all along the Red River. He established an office called Hà Đê chánh phó sứ hai viên to monitor the dikes. In 1231, he issued the construction of reservoirs and canals in Thanh Hóa and Nghệ An. According to historians, by 1250, the Red River irrigation system had been recognizably established. Because the Red River's sediments continuously expanded to the sea, new sections of the dike system were built along Red River and its channels until it reaches the final end. By 1972 it consisted of nearly 2500 miles of dikes, levees, dams and sluices. Heavy monsoon rains coupled with the preoccupation of the civilian population that normally maintained the water works, led to extensive flooding in 1971. In an attempt to garner international opposition against the newest U.S. strategic bombing campaign, Rolling Thunder, the North Vietnamese Government began a propaganda campaign using images of the flood to allege that the U.S. had begun a strategic bombing campaign against the Red River dikes. Given the North Vietnamese tactic of forcing U.S. aircraft to jettison their bombloads and abort their missions, the dikes undoubtedly were their point of impact on occasion, as they may have been for some downed U.S. aircraft.

== Combatants ==
=== North Vietnam ===
As the North Vietnamese called on the local population to maintain the military lines of communication, labor was drawn away from dike maintenance. The problem was exacerbated by the placement of air defense equipment (AA and GCI) on the dikes and the resulting deterioration caused by the vibration of the guns. North Vietnamese SAMs that missed their mark often fell back to earth before exploding, causing additional damage to the dikes. As the dikes deteriorated, however, the North Vietnamese sought a way to continue to fight the war and maintain the dikes. In order to extract a greater effort from their population, they turned the issue into one that would rally the people, alleging that the United States was bombing the dikes intentionally in order to flood the entire delta. Foreign visitors were provided tours of damaged dikes — photographic coverage indicates that most visitors were taken to the same "damaged" dike over a period of several years — to exploit the issue in the foreign press.

=== United States ===
President Richard Nixon and Secretary of State Henry Kissinger discussed bombing the dike network in a 1972 conversation on Operation Linebacker II, later published by Daniel Ellsberg:

Nixon: We've got to quit thinking in terms of a three-day strike [in the Hanoi-Haiphong area]. We've got to be thinking in terms of an all-out bombing attack - which will continue until they - Now by all-out bombing attack, I am thinking about things that go far beyond. I'm thinking of the dikes, I'm thinking of the railroad, I'm thinking, of course, the docks.
Kissinger: I agree with you.
President Nixon: We've got to use massive force.
Two hours later at noon, H. R. Haldeman and Ron Ziegler joined Kissinger and Nixon:
President: How many did we kill in Laos?
Ziegler: Maybe ten thousand - fifteen?
Kissinger: In the Laotian thing, we killed about ten, fifteen.
President: See, the attack in the North that we have in mind, power plants, whatever's left - POL [petroleum], the docks. And, I still think we ought to take the dikes out now. Will that drown people?
Kissinger: About two hundred thousand people.
President: No, no, no, I'd rather use the nuclear bomb. Have you got that, Henry?
Kissinger: That, I think, would just be too much.
President: The nuclear bomb, does that bother you?...I just want you to think big, Henry, for Christsakes.

U.S. investigation into the North Vietnamese claims revealed that U.S. bombing had caused minor damage to the dikes but none of the damaged structures were part of the system protecting Hanoi, and none of the damage was severe enough to cause a major breach. Further complicating matters was the North Vietnamese placement of anti-aircraft radars, surface to air missiles, and artillery atop dike structures. The dike system was also part of the North Vietnamese transportation network, with roads and rail lines in close proximity to the dikes. Although authorization was given during Operation Linebacker II to attack these sites, only the use of napalm, cluster bombs, and other antipersonnel weapons were permitted to be used in an attempt to minimize structural damage.

== International reaction ==
The North Vietnamese used these incidents as part of their propaganda campaign. Actress Jane Fonda is often credited with helping publicize the bombing, for which then U.S. Ambassador to the UN George H. W. Bush accused her of lying. Columnist Joseph Kraft, who was also touring North Vietnam, believed that the damage to the dikes was done in error and was being used as propaganda by Hanoi, and that if the U.S. Air Force were "truly going after the dikes, it would do so in a methodical, not a harum-scarum way." Others, like Jean Thoraval of Agence France-Presse, reported personally witnessing a U.S. bombing raid where a dozen planes had dropped bombs and fired rockets on a nearby dike, concluding that "the attack was aimed at a whole system of dikes." Sweden's ambassador to Hanoi, Jean-Christophe Öberg, along with two Swedish journalists, described the damage to the dikes as "methodic."

An investigation into the bombing of the dikes carried out by a French geographer, Yves Lacoste, concluded that the bombing was based on a systematic policy to flood the eastern part of the delta. According to the investigation, the eastern part was targeted more than the western part which had more military targets (for instance, Hanoi). The investigation stated that the overwhelming majority of dike bombing also occurred on the concave sections of dike, the most vulnerable to such bombing and that the effects of the bombing were profound, as 'minor damage' actually severely weakened the dike structure through sub-surface cracking, which increased vulnerability during periods of high discharge.
