= Mykolaiv National Agrarian University =

Public university in Mykolaiv, Ukraine

Coordinates: 46.96478°N 31.96550°E

- Миколаївський національний аграрний університет
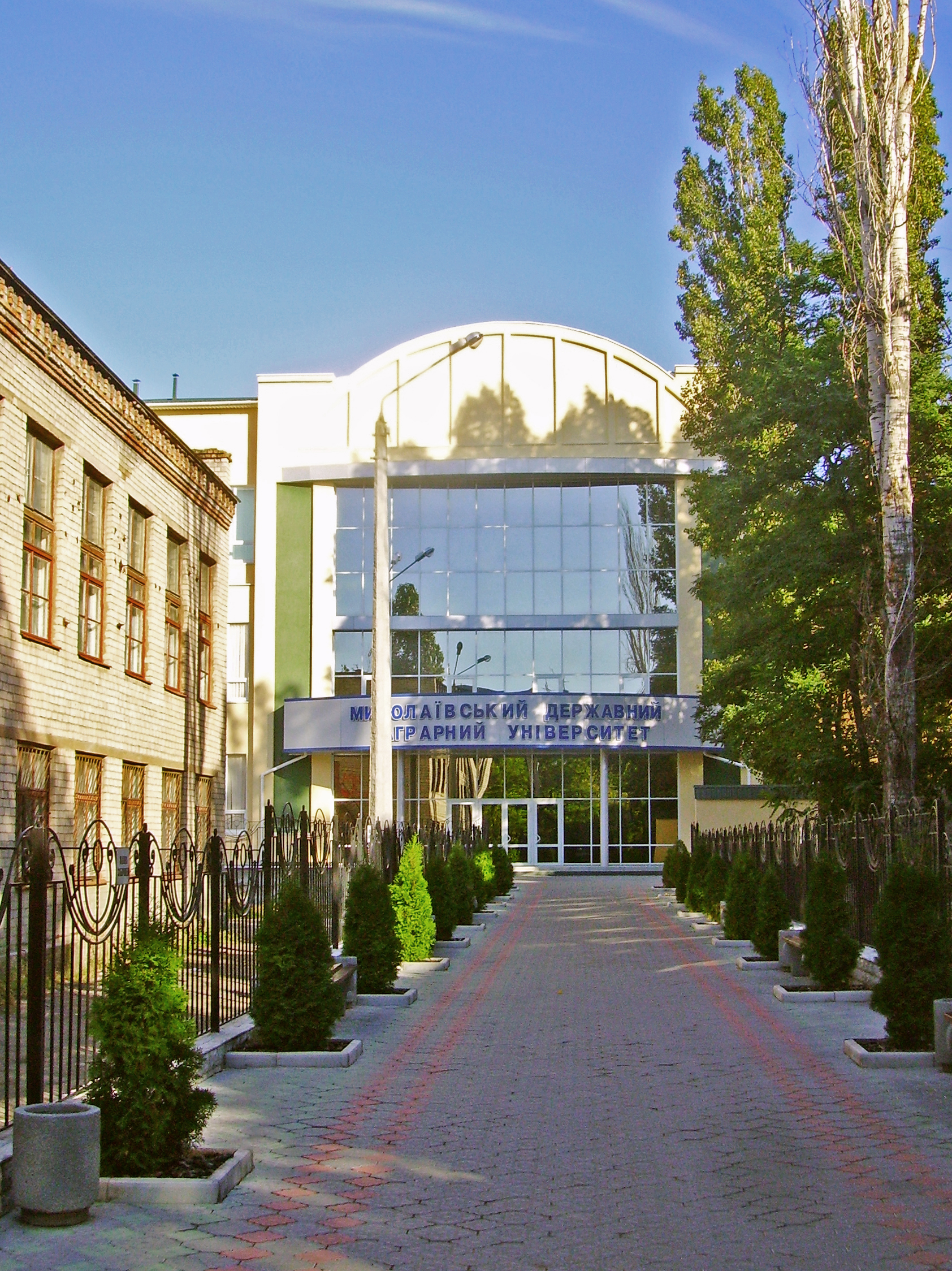
- Motto: From the Light of Knowledge to Prosperity on Earth!
- Type: Public
- Established: 1984
- Affiliations: Ministry of Education and Science of Ukraine
- Rector: Vyacheslav Shebanin (acting)
- Students: ~8000
- Location: Mykolaiv, Ukraine
- Campus: Urban
- Website: www.mnau.edu.ua

The Mykolaiv National Agrarian University (also known as abbr. MNAU, Ukrainian: Миколаївський національний аграрний університет, МНАУ) is a public agricultural college in Mykolaiv, Ukraine.

== Organization ==
Mykolaiv National Agrarian University is the leading institution of higher education in the south of Ukraine.

According to the rating of the agrarian institutions of higher education (III-IV levels of accreditation) the university is the second and it won the honorary title of "The Leader in Modern Science and Education".

Main fields of activities include agrarian and economic education, strengthening the links between Academia and Industry; aspects of investment processes as well as innovative techniques in agriculture.

== See also ==
List of universities in Ukraine
