= Kozatske =

Rural locality in Kherson Oblast, Ukraine

Kozatske Козацьке
- Rural settlement
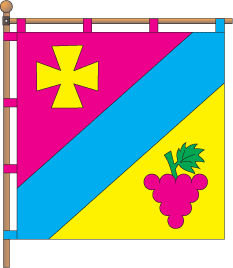
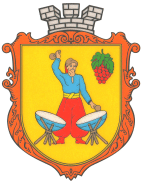
- Flag Coat of arms

- Location in Kherson Oblast Location in Ukraine
- Country: Ukraine
- Oblast: Kherson Oblast
- Raion: Kakhovka Raion
- Hromada: Nova Kakhovka urban hromada

Population (2022)
  - Total: ▼3,653
- Time zone: UTC+2 (EET)
  - Summer (DST): UTC+3 (EEST)

Kozatske (Ukrainian: Козацьке; Russian: Казацкое) is a rural settlement in Kakhovka Raion, Kherson Oblast, southern Ukraine. It is located on the right bank of the Dnieper, separated from Nova Kakhovka on the left bank by the dam of the Kakhovka Hydroelectric Power Plant. Kozatske belongs to Nova Kakhovka urban hromada, one of the hromadas of Ukraine. It has a population of 3,653 (2022 estimate).

== History ==
Until 18 July 2020, Kozatske belonged to Beryslav Raion. As part of the administrative reform of Ukraine, which reduced the number of raions of Kherson Oblast to five, it was transferred to Kakhovka Raion.

During the Russian invasion of Ukraine, fighting took place in Kozatske and neighboring Vesele on 25 February 2022.

Until 26 January 2024, Kozatske was designated urban-type settlement. On this day, a new law entered into force which abolished this status, and Kozatske became a rural settlement.

== Economy ==
=== Transportation ===
Kozatska railway station is on the railway connecting Mykolaiv via Snihurivka and Nova Kakhovka with Melitopol. There is infrequent passenger traffic.

The settlement has road access to Kherson and, via Nova Kakhovka, with Highway M14 connecting Kherson with Melitopol.

== See also ==
- Russian occupation of Kherson Oblast
