= Park miniatúr =

Miniature park in Podolie, Slovakia

Coordinates: 48°40′36.14″N 17°46′17.86″E

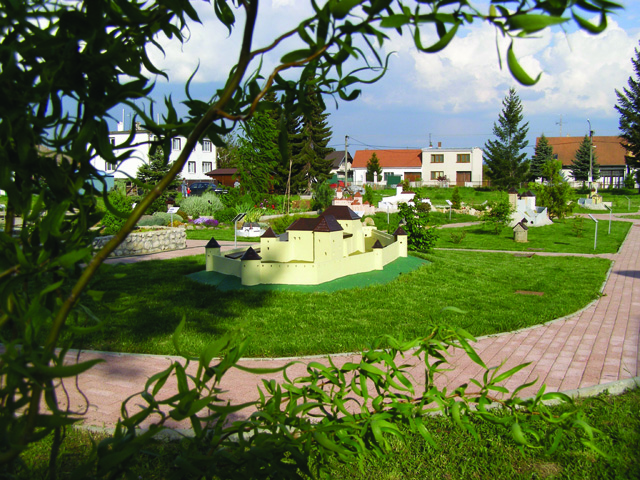
Park miniatúr

Park miniatúr is a miniature park in Podolie, Slovakia. It displays 32 miniature models of architecture from Slovakia, built at a ratio of 1:25 and 1:50.

The park was established on 25 October 2003. In the final form of park, there will be 80 miniature models.

A small selection of the models:

- Čachtický hrad
- Tematín
- Svätý Kríž
- Nový zámok Banská Štiavnica
- Červený Kameň

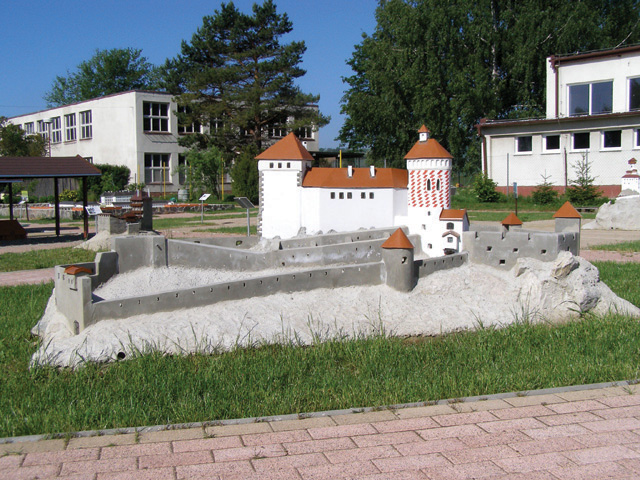
Miniature of Cachtice Castle in Park miniatur
