= Nova Kakhovka River Port =

- Interactive map of Nova Kakhovka River Port
- Native name: Новокаховський річковий порт

Location
- Country: Ukraine
- Location: 74900, Kherson Oblast, Town of Tavriisk, Portova Street, Building 1
- Coordinates: 46.7738°N 33.3999°E

Nova Kakhovka River Port is in Tavriisk, a town on the eastern side of Nova Kakhovka, in Kherson Oblast, Ukraine. The port is on the left bank of the Dnipro river, at the south-western end of the Kakhovka Reservoir, adjacent to Kakhovka Dam. The port is in a basin at the upstream end of the shipping lock that passes through the dam. The port opened in 1962.

The duration of navigation is just 270 days a year due to ice in mid-December that generally thaws by mid-March. All types of river vessels and river-sea vessels are accepted. The port provides services for the transportation of bulk mineral cargo, construction cargo, and weighing of goods. It is also possible to store cargo, taking into account the movement of the warehouse. The total area of open warehouses is 61,500 square metres (662,000 ft^{2}).

The North Crimean Canal starts within the basin, near the port.

== See also ==
- Cargo turnover of Ukrainian ports
- Hydrofoil
- Battle of Kherson
- Southern Ukraine offensive
- Timeline of the 2022 Russian invasion of Ukraine
- 2022 Russian invasion of Ukraine
