= Nova Kakhovka =

City in Kherson Oblast, Ukraine

Nova Kakhovka Нова Каховка
- City
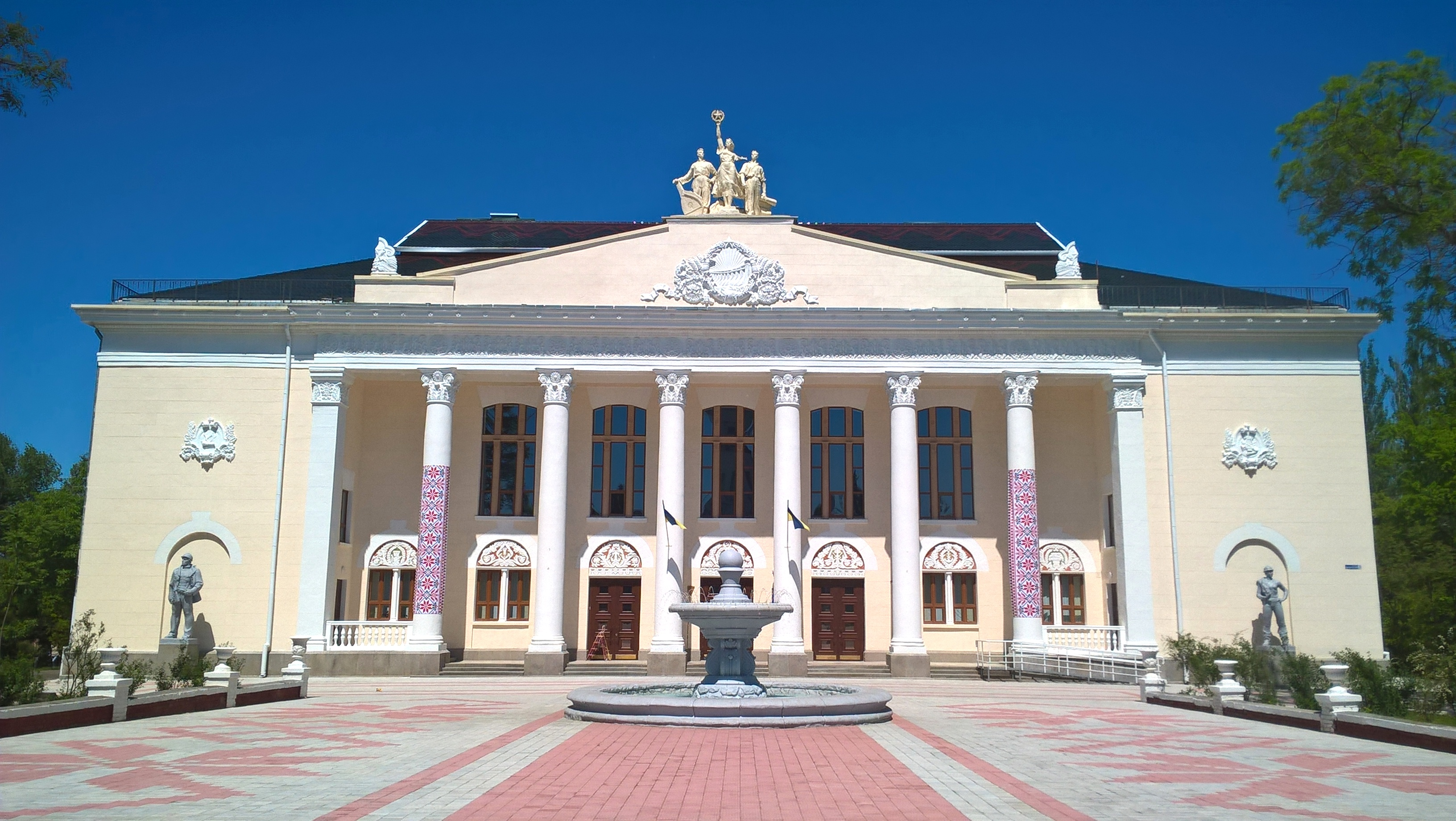
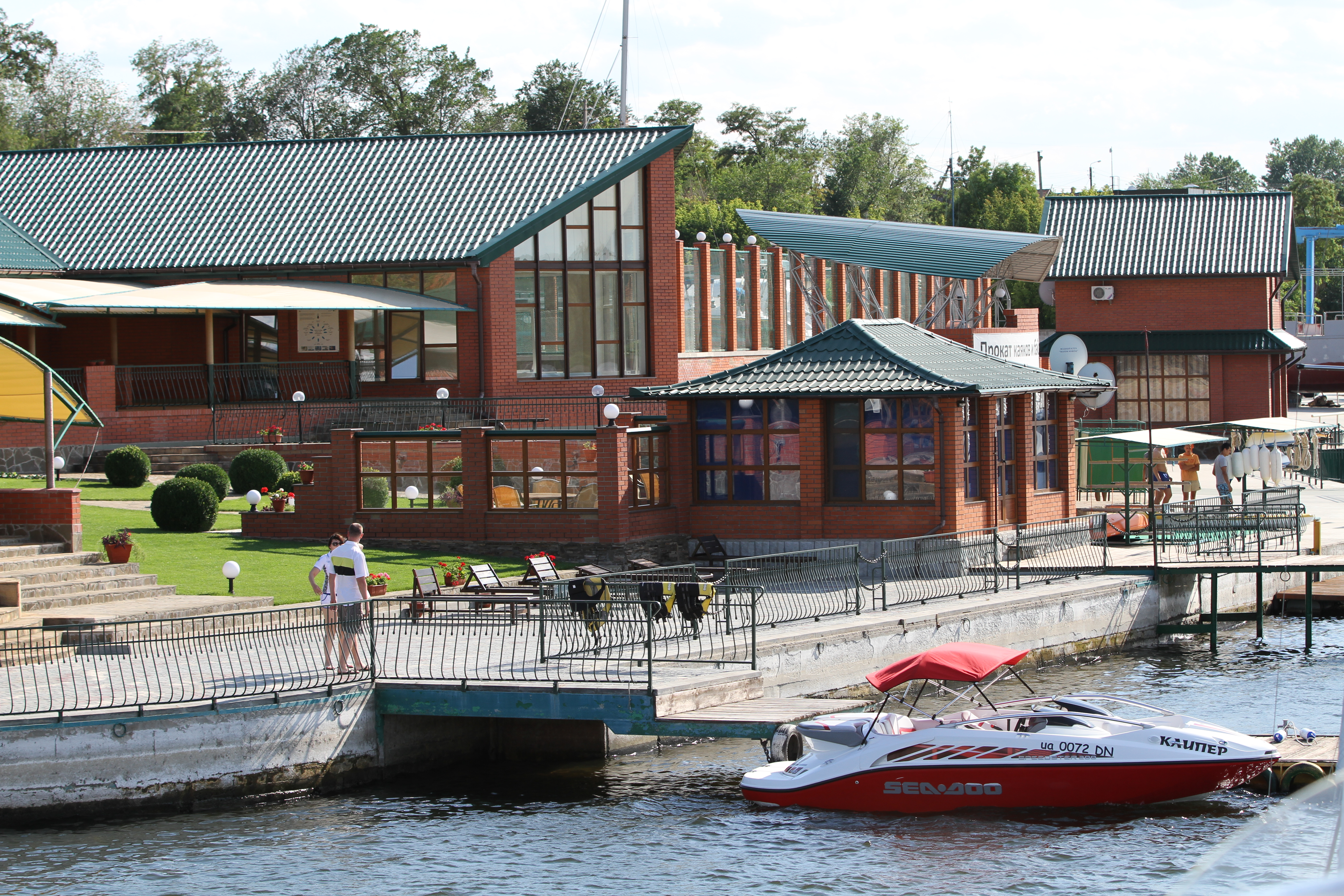
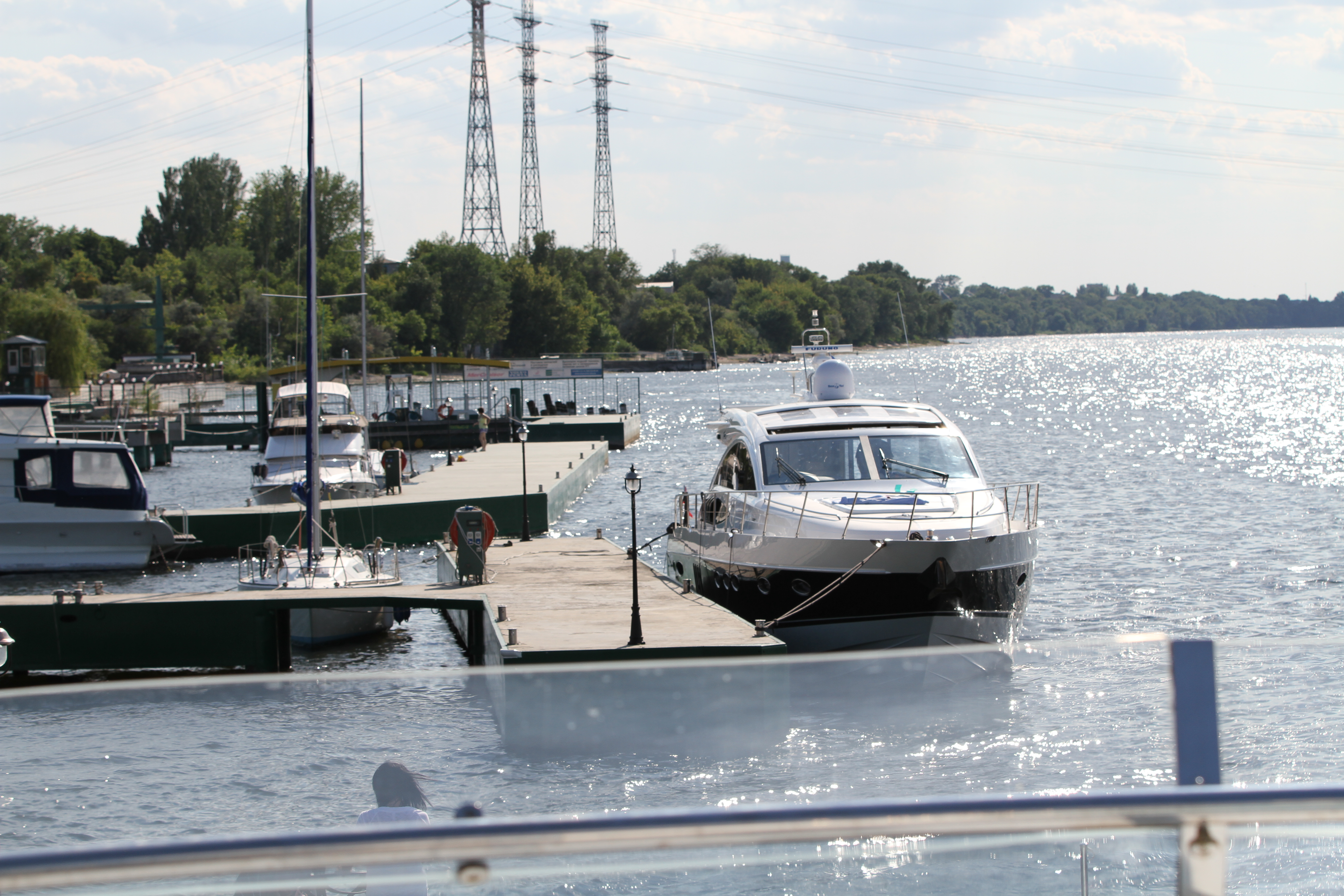
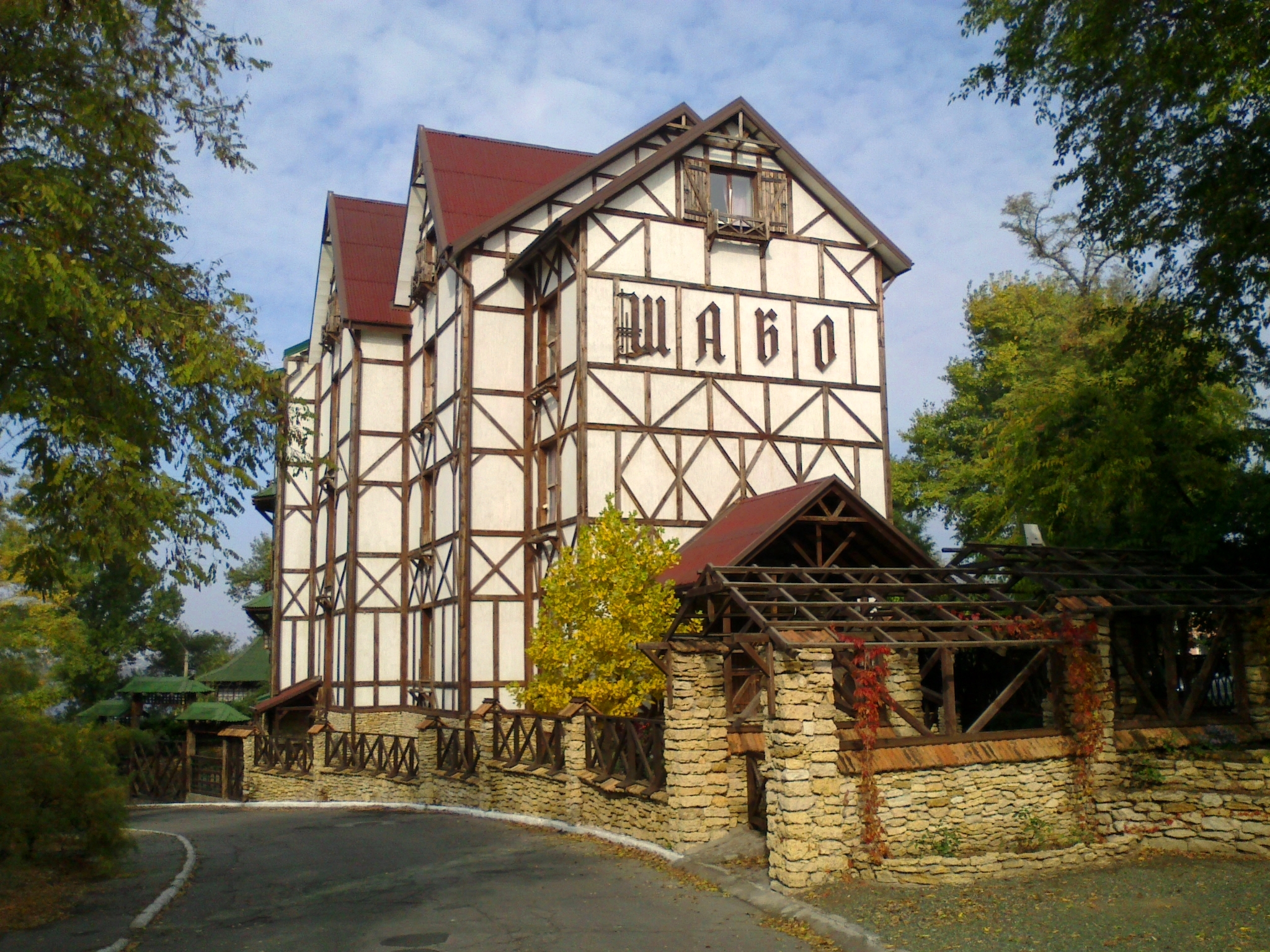
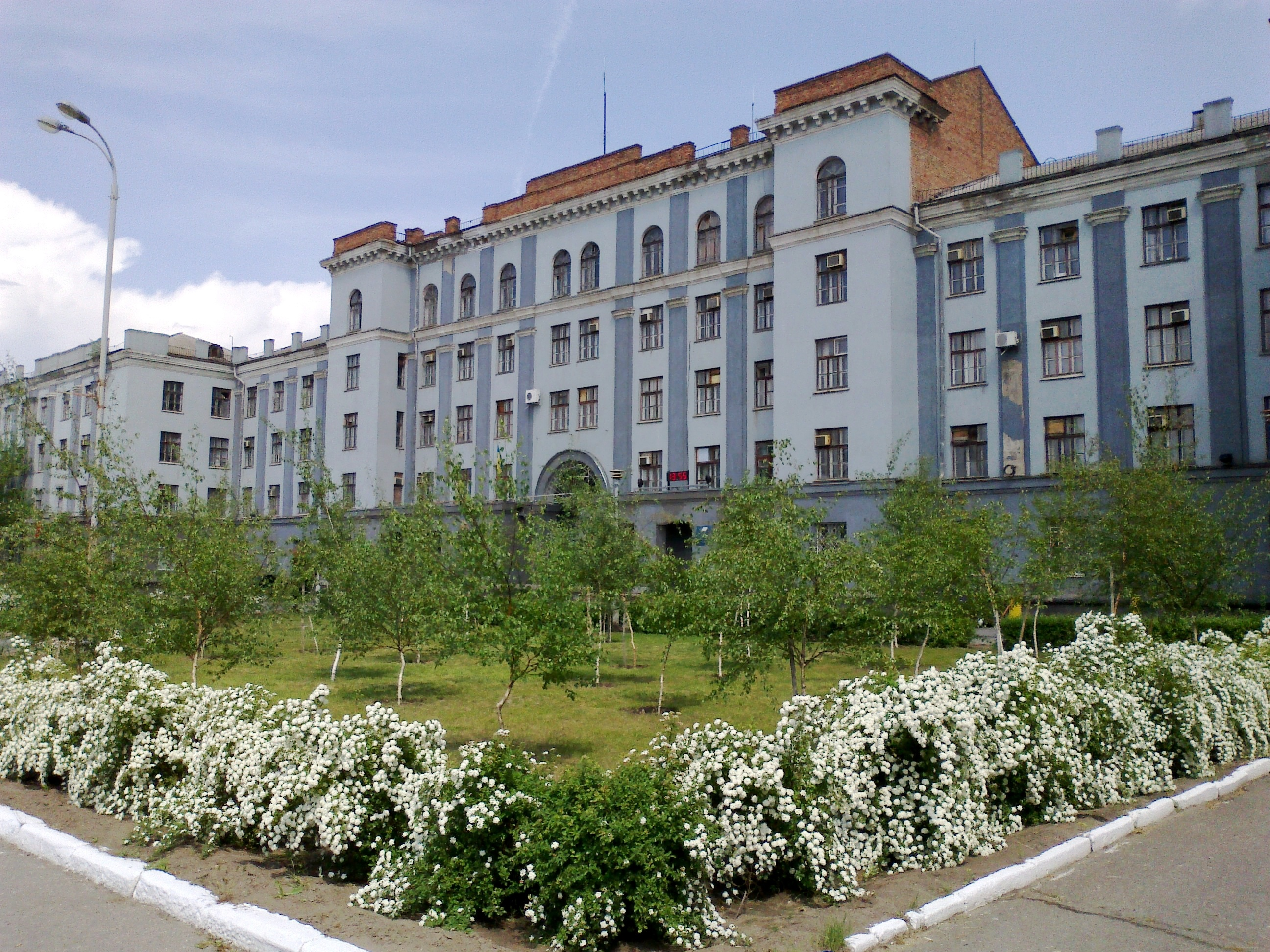
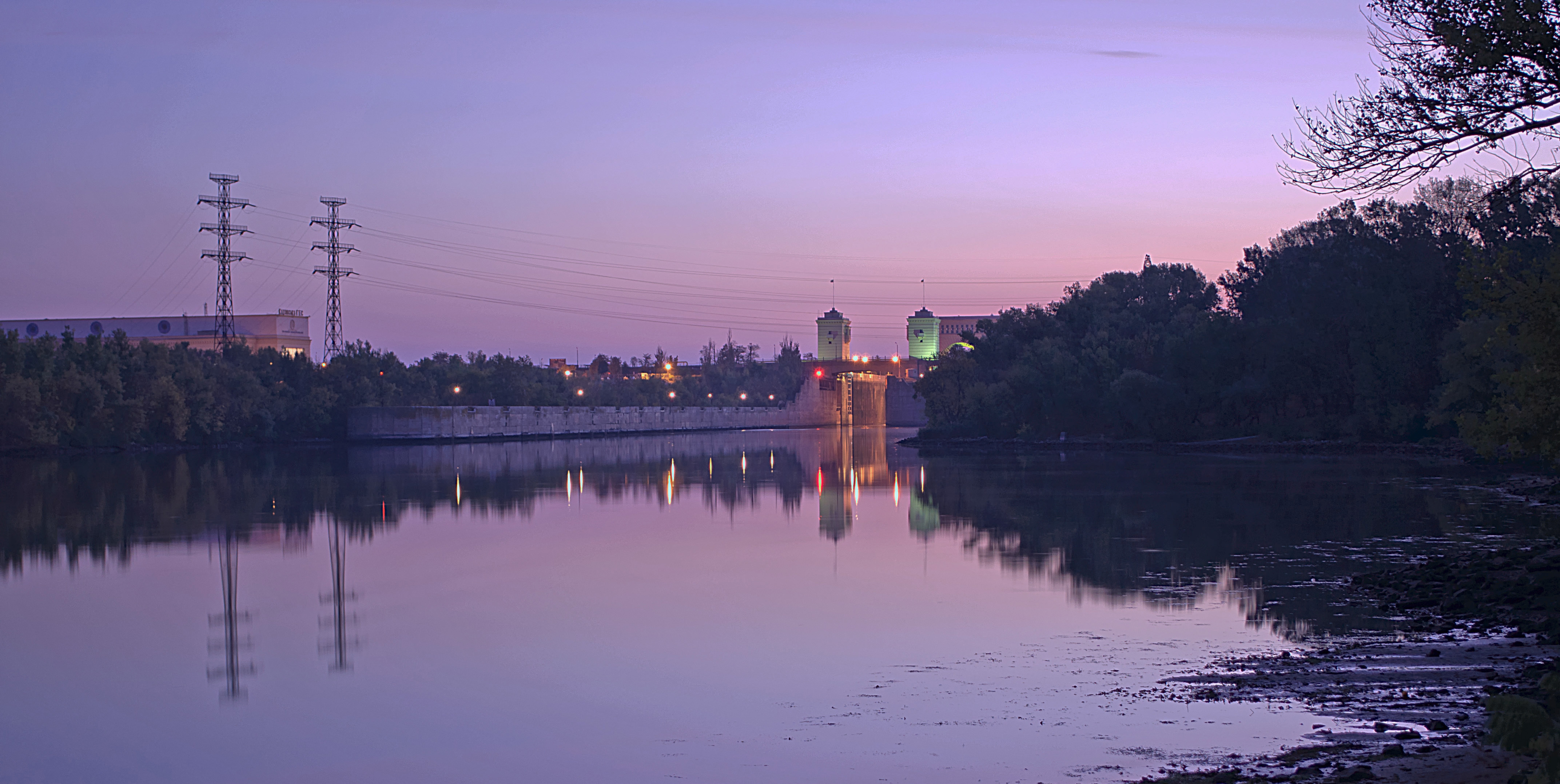

- Flag Coat of arms
- Interactive map of Nova Kakhovka
- Location of Nova Kakhovka Nova Kakhovka (Ukraine)
- Coordinates: 46°45′18″N 33°22′30″E
- Country: Ukraine
- Oblast: Kherson Oblast
- Raion: Kakhovka Raion
- Hromada: Nova Kakhovka urban hromada
- Founded: 28 February 1952

Government
  - Mayor (de facto): Vladimir Oganesov

Area
  - Total: 222.7 km^{2} (86.0 sq mi)
- Elevation: 21 m (69 ft)

Population (2024)
  - Total: 10,000 ▼
  - Density: 45/km^{2} (120/sq mi)
- Postal code: 74900
- Area code: +380 5549
- Climate: Dfa
- Website: novakahovka.com.ua

Nova Kakhovka (Ukrainian: Нова Каховка, IPA: [noˈwɑ kɐˈxɔu̯kɐ]; Russian: Новая Каховка, romanized: Novaya Kakhovka) is a city in Kakhovka Raion, Kherson Oblast, southern Ukraine. Nova Kakhovka has been under Russian occupation since February 2022. Its estimated population in 2022 was 44,427.

Nova Kakhovka is an important port city on the east bank of the Dnieper River, where it meets the downstream end of the Kakhovka Reservoir. It forms one abutment of the Kakhovskyi Bridge over the hydroelectric Kakhovka Dam; the other is located in Beryslav. The city lies immediately downstream of the source of the North Crimean Canal that irrigates the Crimean Peninsula and can be said to control the seat of the channel.

On 6 June 2023, the dam was deliberately destroyed, causing catastrophic drainage of the reservoir. At the time, the dam was under the control of the Russian military, which had seized it in the early days of the Russian invasion of Ukraine.

== History ==
A village named Klisheve (or Klyuchove) was founded at the site of modern Nova Kakhovka in 1891. Nova Kakhovka proper was founded in 1951 in connection with the building of the Kakhovka Hydroelectric Power Plant (KHPP), on the site of the former Klisheve. The village was named after a clear freshwater spring.

In 1889 a French immigrant built a Cognac vineyard near the village growing on 1,380 hectares and was recognized as some of the best in the country, being widely exported to up to 15 countries.

The KHPP dam was one of the Soviet Union's Great Construction Projects of Communism. The new city was built to house the plant's construction workers. It was given the name Nova Kakhovka, or New Kakhovka, by the Presidium of the Supreme Soviet to distinguish it from the city Kakhovka located 15 km (9.3 mi) away.

Schools 1 and 2 opened in the fall of 1950, and on 10 October, the Dniprobud administration created a housing department tasked with building a new town of hydroelectric engineers. By 20 April 1951, the foundation of the first residential building, at Karl Marx, 31, had been laid, followed by the building's opening on 30 May.

In nine months, 154 km of railways were built, and on 10 February 1952, a train from Fedorivka arrived in Nova Kakhovka. At noon, a freight train originating in Chelyabinsk, Moscow, Bryansk approached the triumphal arch, where it was met by thousands of construction workers before delivering its load directly to a construction site. The railway became an important transportation artery, accelerating the construction of the hydroelectric plant, city, suburban farms, and the entire middle portion of the Kherson region. After the completion of the power plant, most of the workers stayed in Nova Kakhovka.

Originally planned as a settlement of around 20,000 hydroelectric workers and engineers, Nova Kakhovka later expanded beyond its initial role. Its development was facilitated by its location in Kherson Oblast, access to low-cost electricity, and connections to rail, road and river transport networks.

=== Independent Ukraine ===
After Ukrainian independence Soviet industry and infrastructure, namely the hydroelectric dam and the Crimea canal, remained the economic lifeblood of the city, however, new industries, such as an aerated concrete plant in 2007, were built. However, like many small to medium Ukrainian cities in the 1990s and 2000s, the city saw a massive population decline, as younger people moved to bigger cities such as Kherson, Mykolaiv and Kyiv for high paying white collar jobs. After Euromaidan and the start of the War in Donbas in 2014, this population decline only expedited, as state budgets where redirect from subsidizing smaller cities to pay for the army and other centralized state services. Nova Kakhovka attempted to rebound by centering its economy around Green tourism, with the city's architectural history, and harmonious design with the Dnipro waterfront being a draw for tourists. The city also heavily invested in sports complexes, becoming a regional hub for amateur and semi-professional sporting events and tournaments. 23 tourist facilities would be opened in the city including a winery, a refurbished Cognac house, and more structured tours of the city's old monastery and defensive watchtower.

Until 18 July 2020, Nova Kakhovka was incorporated as a city of oblast significance and the center of Nova Kakhovka Municipality. The municipality as an administrative unit was abolished in July 2020 as part of the administrative reform of Ukraine, which reduced the number of raions of Kherson Oblast to five, and it was merged into Kakhovka Raion.

=== Russian invasion of Ukraine ===
The Russian occupation of Nova Kakhovka in Ukraine began on 24 February 2022 when Russian forces coming from the direction of occupied Crimea shelled the hydroelectric plant at around 5:00am, however, the plant was undefended and surrendered without a fight by its staff at 11:00am. The following day Russian forces entered the city proper. Then mayor Volodymyr Kovalenko gave a through account of the occupation, stating that shortly before the occupation the district administration and the district council were evacuated, leaving him "practically alone" as the sole Ukrainian authority in the city. Kovalenko stated that on the first day of the occupation the Russians weren't terribly interested in the civilian government, which had time to burn or hide lists of prominent individuals connected to the government or military, and had significant food and medical stores in warehouses around the city. Very quickly drug addicts and the homeless approached the Russian forces to act as informants, turning over civilians on dubious allegations of being spies or otherwise sympathetic to Kyiv for pay or food. By the end of the first day the director of the hydropower plant reported to Kovalenko that he had personally witnessed Russian forces shell a civilian car trying to flee, killing a grandfather, a grandmother, two grandchildren and a daughter-in-law. On day three Kovalenko reports that a farmer was indiscriminately shot in her front yard while going out to feed her livestock, while at the same time Russian forces began to hunt for local veterans from the 2014 ATO to kill them as a reprisal for their service. The first ATO veteran to die was a water company driver, who had served in logistics convoys during the ATO, being shot on the fifth day of occupation. All the while the Russians left Kovalenko and what remained of his administration unmolested. He was then told by the military commander that he would have a Russian installed supervisor look over his shoulder and that he was expected to work for the Russian government indefinitely. The night of March 1 Kovalenko too chose to flee the city, stating he couldn't bare the thought of looking people whom he led as mayor for 20 years in the eyes as a willing Russian collaborator. Kovalenko stated that his only formal act as mayor during his five day rule under occupation was to convince local entrepreneurs to donate to a fund to pay pensioners in the city, as contact with the rest of Ukraine was severed and it was otherwise impossible to do so.

With control of the city lost, Volodymyr Zelenskyy created a municipal government in exile, the "Novokakhovka City Military Administration" (CMA) with his 328th presidential decree on December 20, 2022. Valerii Brusenskyi was named the first head of the CMA, having been a member of the Kakhovka District Council, elected in the 2020 Ukrainian local elections as a member of Servant of the People who served as Council Chairman at the time of the invasion. The CMA only has jurisdiction around the small portion of the Kakhovka Raion on the left side of the Dnipro river, however, prior to the war, these were mostly small villages, and have since become abandoned due to persistent Russian shelling and flooding. As such the CMA's operations are largely limited to humanitarian efforts to assist the tens of thousands of residents who fled Nova Kakhovka to Ukrainian controlled territory, as well as maintaining intelligence circles and contacts within the city proper.

In Kovalenko's place Russia installed one of their local collaborator informants, Volodymyr Leontiev, as the new "mayor" although he was never formally elected, and held the title illegally. Over the next few months, the city was occupied by Russian forces, and the population was subjected to pro-Russian rallies and the reopening of a Lenin monument. Ukrainian troops responded with acts of resistance, destroying Russian military units and ammunition warehouses, though they were unable to put an end to the Russian presence in Nova Kakhovka. Leontiev would rule through fear of kidnapping, making vocal opponents of Russian occupation disappear, only to be released with significant evidence of torture. Among some of the notable individuals Leontiev would kidnap include; Mykola Rizak, mayor of Tavriysk, Oleh Baturin, a Kakhovka based journalist, Dmitry Vasilyev, secretary of the Nova Kakhovka city council, and his wife, Liudmyla Vasilyeva. Leontiev would be tried for these kidnappings in absentia by a court in Odesa in March 2023. The individuals where often held under false names, so they had no record of being abducted, and where subjected to torture alongside threats of amputation or death, before ultimately being released so they could tell others what Russians will do to them if they oppose them. Behind the scenes Leontiev worked on the creation of a new legislature for the district he governed, the "Council of Deputies of the Novokakhovsk Urban Okrug" which he designed to have basically absolute power over the district in a single office, with his former offices being reduced to little more than figureheads. On 9 January 2023, Russian occupation forces ordered the closing of several area hospitals, and on 20 January, the city hospital was shelled. This was followed by more mortar attacks, leading to a partial loss of electricity and damage to residential buildings. The illegal and sham 2023 elections in Russian-occupied Ukraine elected the first Deputies to this council, including Leontiev who resigned as mayor to be named the Council's President, effectively retaining his power.

The office of mayor was passed to Leontiev's deputy; Vitaly Gura, the former elder of the village of Dnipriany, who, prior to the war was head of a government contracted mechanic company that repaired all of Nova Kakhovka's utility vehicles before the war, and was supposedly close with Kovalenko. Instead of ruling through fear, Gura instead ruled through corruption, giving lucrative government contracts to allies, and creating a network of mini-oligarchs across the city, as a sort of imitation of Putinism and Silovikis. Even the CMA reported that Gura's rule saw a general softening of the occupation, with the torture chamber under the Nova Kakhovka police station reportedly being shut down. His corruption ring controlled all of the city's housing and utilities, and would illegally seize land and property on a whim. Gura survived two assassination attempts, one in the summer of 2022 and another in March 2023. On 6 June 2023, the Kakhovka Dam was blown up, causing extensive flooding and prompting mass evacuations. While experts and observers agree that Russia blew the dam in an effort to prevent a Kherson Counteroffensive-like counteroffensive from crossing the Dnipro river, Russia still denies it had anything to do with the massive explosion at the hydropower dam under their direct military control, despite studies of footage of the blast showing it could only have come from inside the structure, as a planned demolition. Gura was also sentenced alongside Leontiev in absentia in March 2023, due to helping orchestrate the kidnapping ring as Leontiev's deputy. At the time of the 2024 Russian presidential election, the head of the CMA reported that according to operatives still in the city, the population now stood at just above 10,000, having been ~68,000 before the war. Gura's corruption eventually became so flagrant that even Russian authorities couldn't ignore it anymore, and after being caught on camera making obscene gestures to a World War II memorial and shouting at it, Russia installed the occupation governor of Kherson Oblast, Vladimir Saldo, removed him from his office on May 27, 2025, and also kicked him out of the United Russia party.

In his place Saldo installed Oleh Tarabaka as the new "acting mayor." She still holds this office. Longtime leader of the Ukrainian CMA Brusenskyi would be replaced sometime between August 25–28 with Oleh Tarabaka the former deputy of Kovalenko. On October 1, Saldo announced that Leontiev was assassinated by a "Baba Yaga drone."

== Geography ==
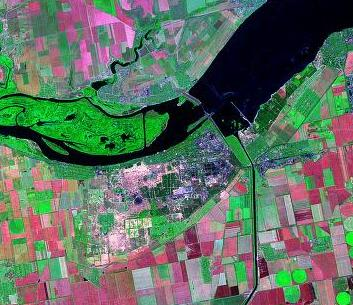
Landsat image of Nova Kakhovka.

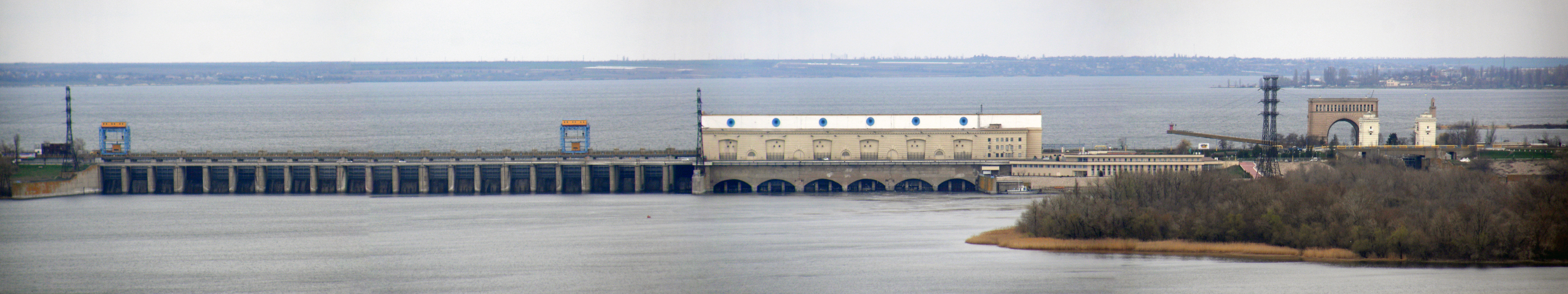
Panorama of the Kakhovka Reservoir and the city's hydroelectric plant

The city is sometimes referred to as an oasis because it was built on an area where sand was plentiful. During the city's construction, sod was brought in to build its parks directly on the sandy ground. Architectural plans were developed to build streets and squares in harmony with the reservoir shoreline.

=== Climate ===
Climate data for Nova Kakhovka (1981–2010)
| Month | Jan | Feb | Mar | Apr | May | Jun | Jul | Aug | Sep | Oct | Nov | Dec | Year |
|---|---|---|---|---|---|---|---|---|---|---|---|---|---|
| Mean daily maximum °C (°F) | 1.6 (34.9) | 2.3 (36.1) | 7.5 (45.5) | 15.5 (59.9) | 22.2 (72.0) | 26.3 (79.3) | 28.9 (84.0) | 28.4 (83.1) | 22.7 (72.9) | 15.8 (60.4) | 7.9 (46.2) | 2.9 (37.2) | 15.2 (59.4) |
| Daily mean °C (°F) | −1.4 (29.5) | −1.2 (29.8) | 3.1 (37.6) | 10.2 (50.4) | 16.4 (61.5) | 20.6 (69.1) | 23.2 (73.8) | 22.8 (73.0) | 17.3 (63.1) | 11.0 (51.8) | 4.6 (40.3) | 0.1 (32.2) | 10.6 (51.1) |
| Mean daily minimum °C (°F) | −4.0 (24.8) | −4.1 (24.6) | −0.1 (31.8) | 5.7 (42.3) | 11.2 (52.2) | 15.5 (59.9) | 17.8 (64.0) | 17.4 (63.3) | 12.6 (54.7) | 7.2 (45.0) | 1.8 (35.2) | −2.4 (27.7) | 6.6 (43.9) |
| Average precipitation mm (inches) | 30.2 (1.19) | 32.6 (1.28) | 30.8 (1.21) | 37.3 (1.47) | 40.2 (1.58) | 48.1 (1.89) | 46.8 (1.84) | 32.3 (1.27) | 39.9 (1.57) | 30.6 (1.20) | 37.9 (1.49) | 38.0 (1.50) | 444.7 (17.51) |
| Average precipitation days (≥ 1.0 mm) | 6.4 | 5.8 | 6.9 | 5.6 | 6.0 | 6.2 | 5.0 | 3.9 | 4.8 | 4.6 | 5.9 | 6.4 | 67.5 |
| Average relative humidity (%) | 84.6 | 82.2 | 77.4 | 68.4 | 64.5 | 65.4 | 61.7 | 60.2 | 67.5 | 74.7 | 83.5 | 85.9 | 73.0 |
Source: World Meteorological Organization

== Demographics ==
Distribution of the population by ethnic groups according to the 2001 Ukrainian census:

Ethnic groups in Nova Kakhovka
| | percent |
| Ukrainians | 73.81% |
| Russians | 23.37% |
| Belarusians | 0.91% |
| Armenians | 0.30% |
| Moldovans | 0.16% |
| Poles | 0.16% |
| Tatars | 0.15% |

Native languages according to the 2001 Ukrainian census:

Native languages in Nova Kakhovka
| | percent |
| Ukrainian | 53.2% |
| Russian | 45.9% |
| Others | 0.8% |

== Modern Nova Kakhovka ==
=== Economy and transport ===
The main economic activities in Nova Kakhovka are engineering (electrotechnology) and power production. Near the city, the large North Crimean Canal begins, supplying southwest Kherson Oblast and the entire northern part of the Crimea with water from the Dnieper River.

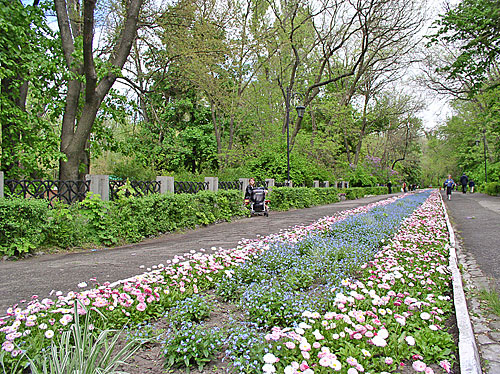
A pathway in Stepan Faldzinsky Park

The city is located between Kherson in the west and Melitopol to the east, near European route E58, which runs from Odesa to Rostov-on-Don. The city has a non-electrified, one-track railway, an airport, a water route to the Black Sea, and a port located on the southwest part of the Khakovka Reservoir.

=== City attractions ===
Stepan Faldzinsky Park, a designated protected natural area, is named after the native Polish agrarian from Podolie who created the green oasis at the Oleshky Sands. The city is also known for its "stone embroidery" - exterior moulding with traditional Ukrainian patterns (vyshyvankas) done in 1953-1955 by a group of Boychukist artists.

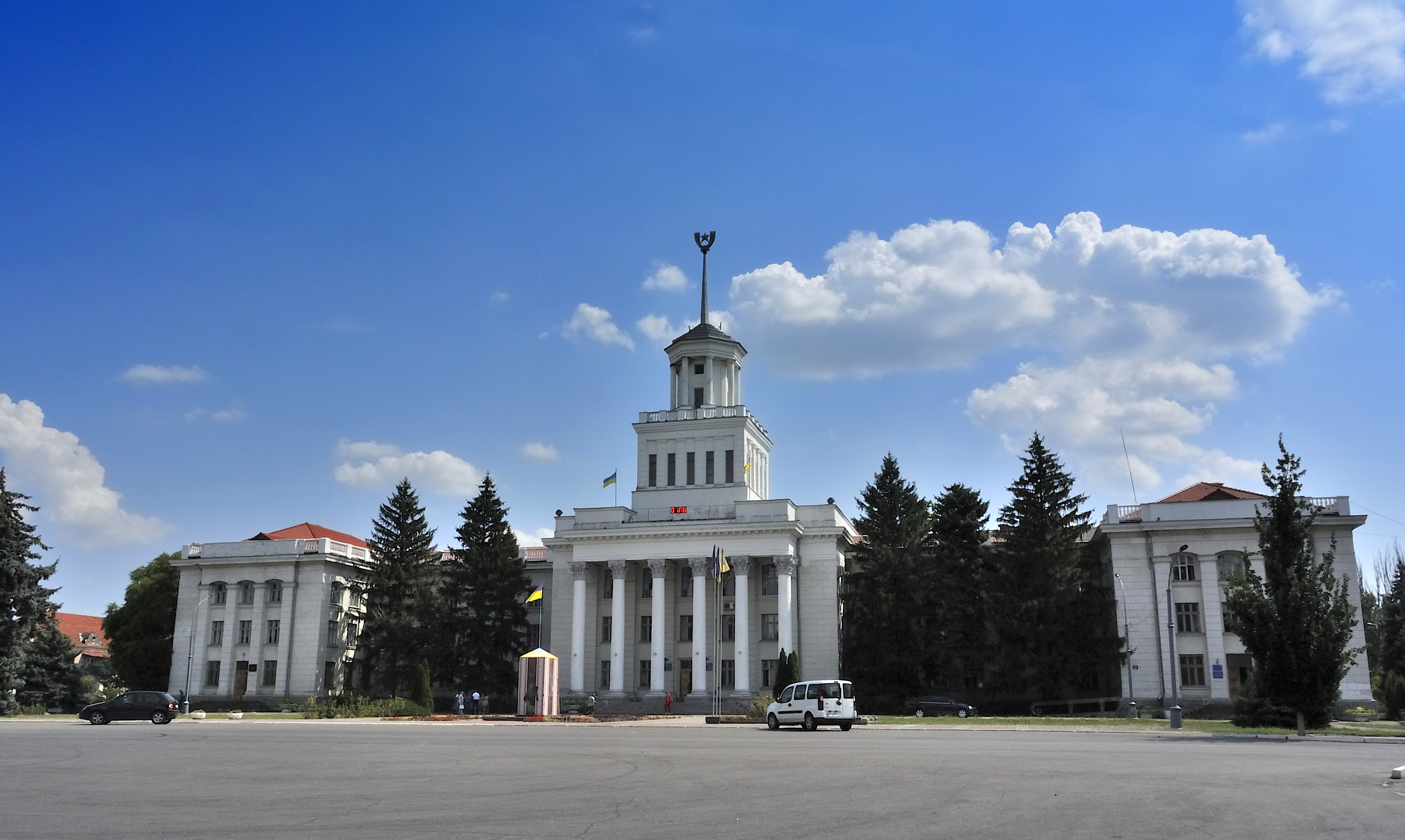
The administrative center of Nova Kakhovka

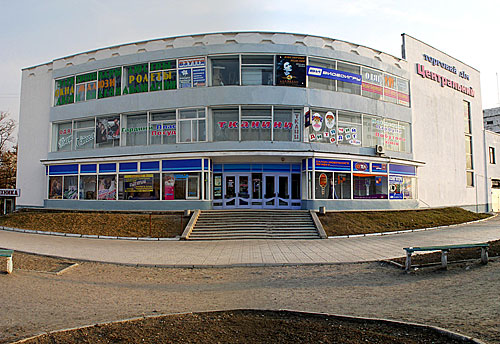
The Central shopping centre, formerly Children's World

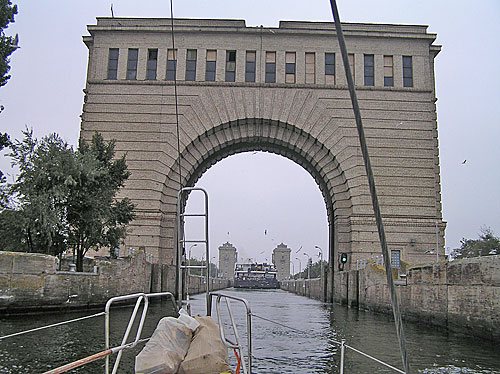
Triumphal arch over the Nova Kakhovka locks

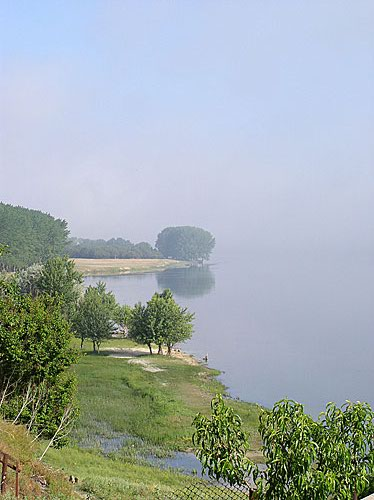
The shoreline in Nova Kakhovka

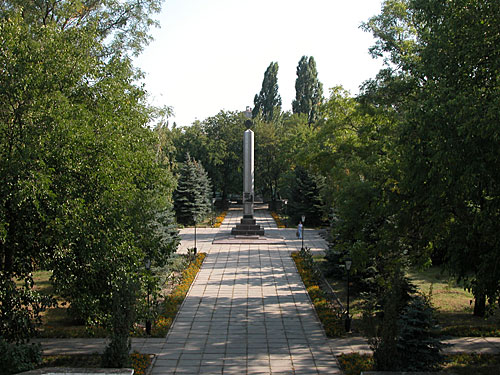
The Park of Glory

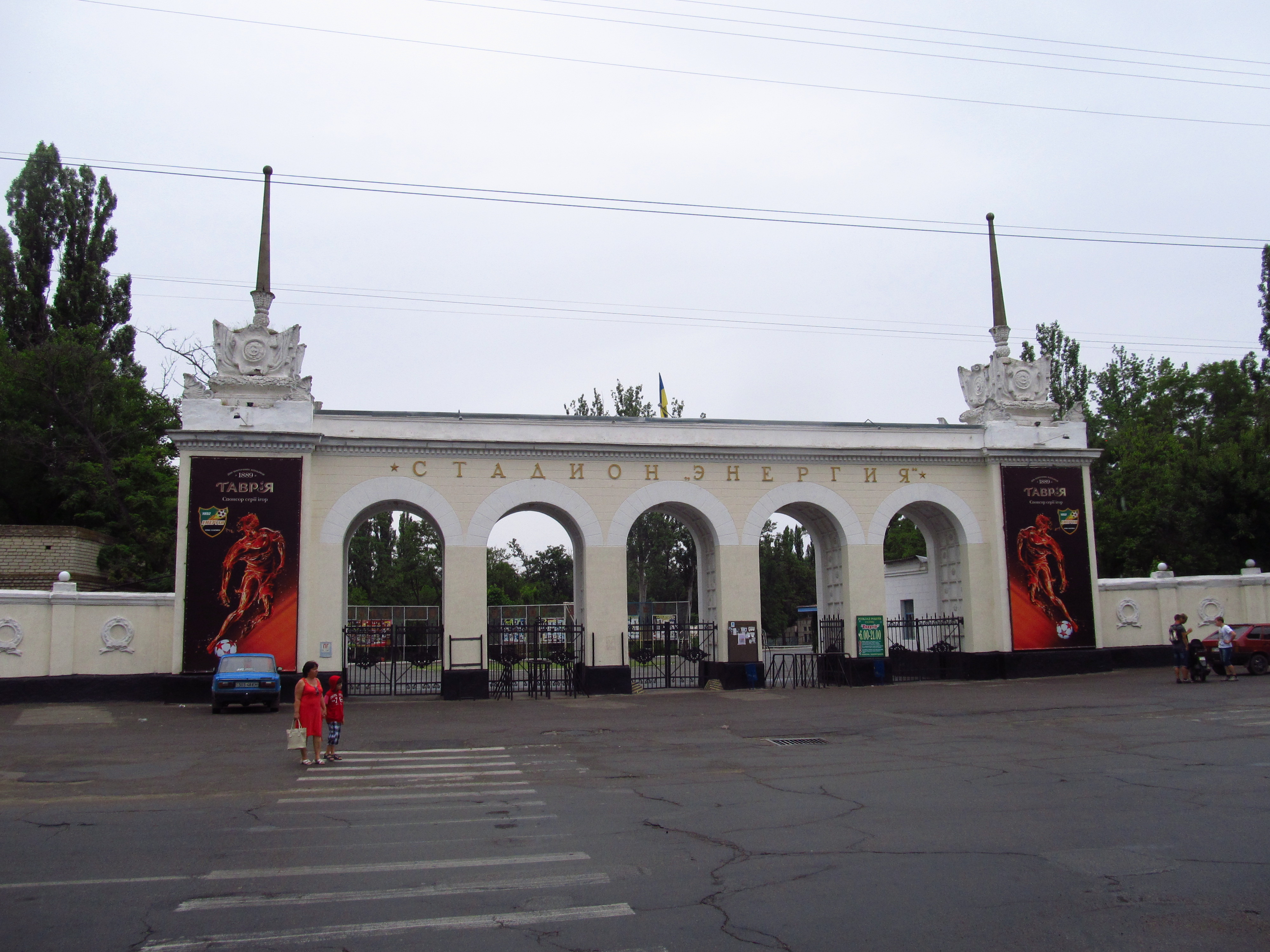
Enerhiya Stadium

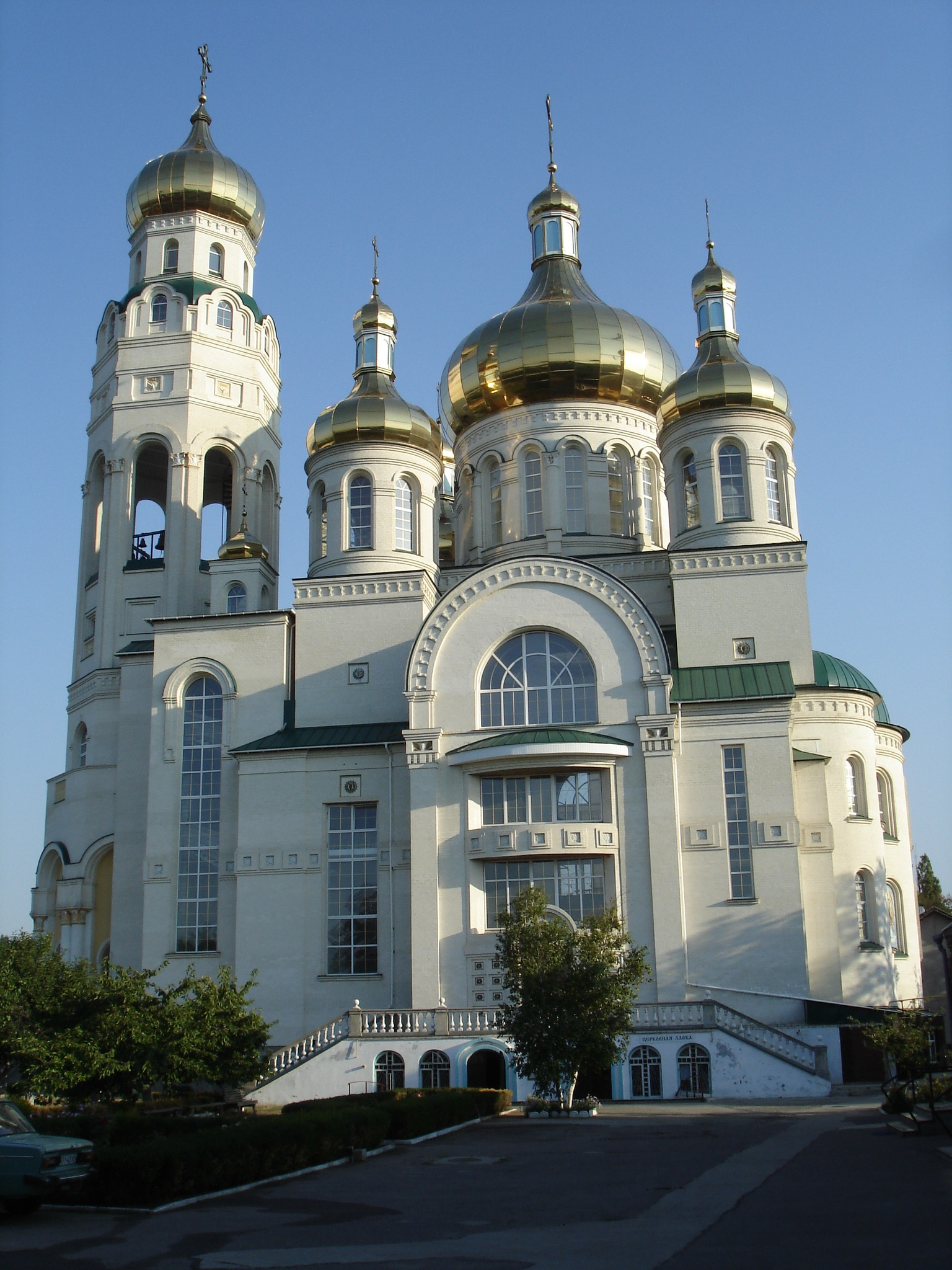
Nova Kakhovka Orthodox Cathedral

== Culture ==
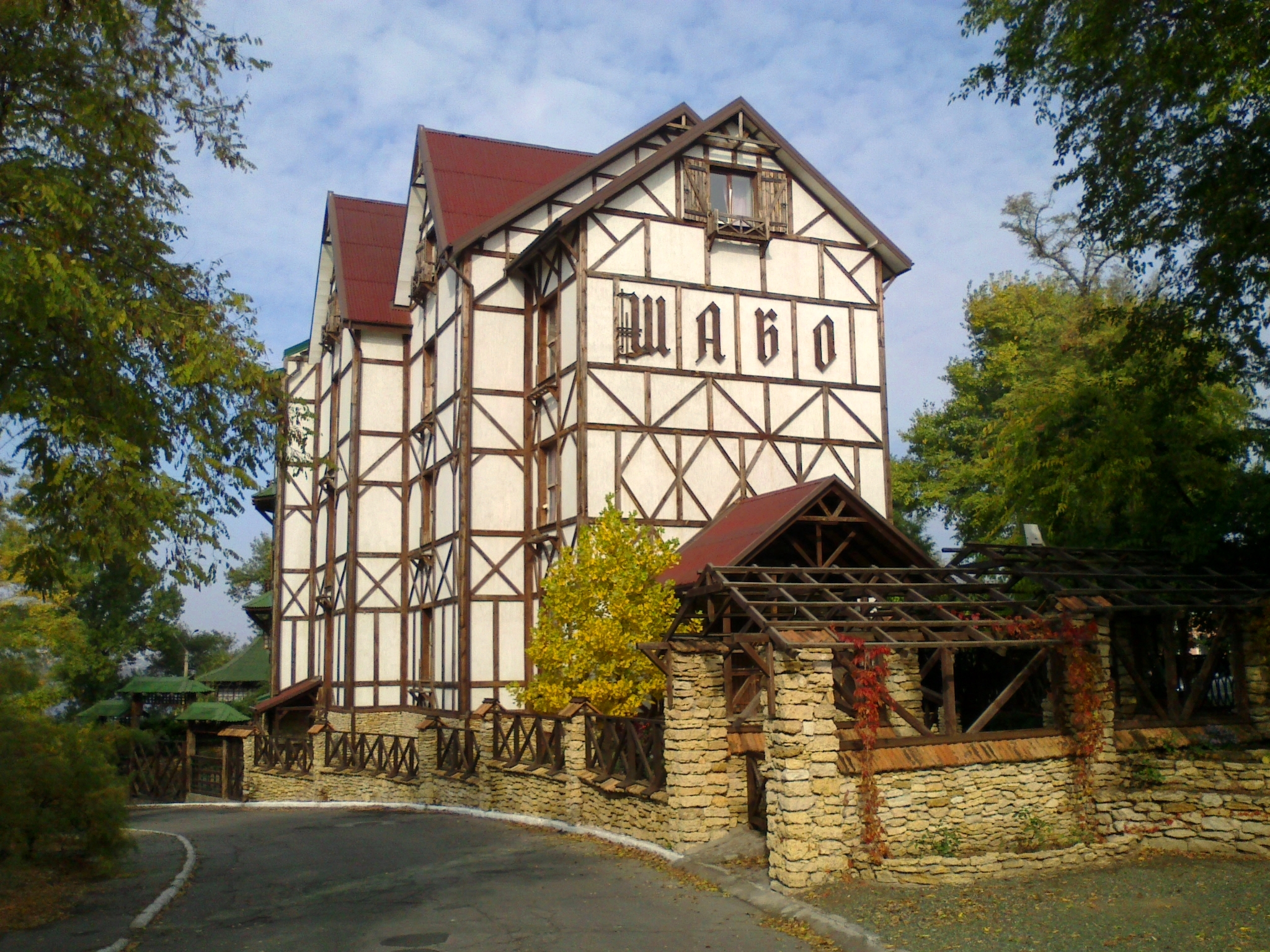
SHABO restaurant complex

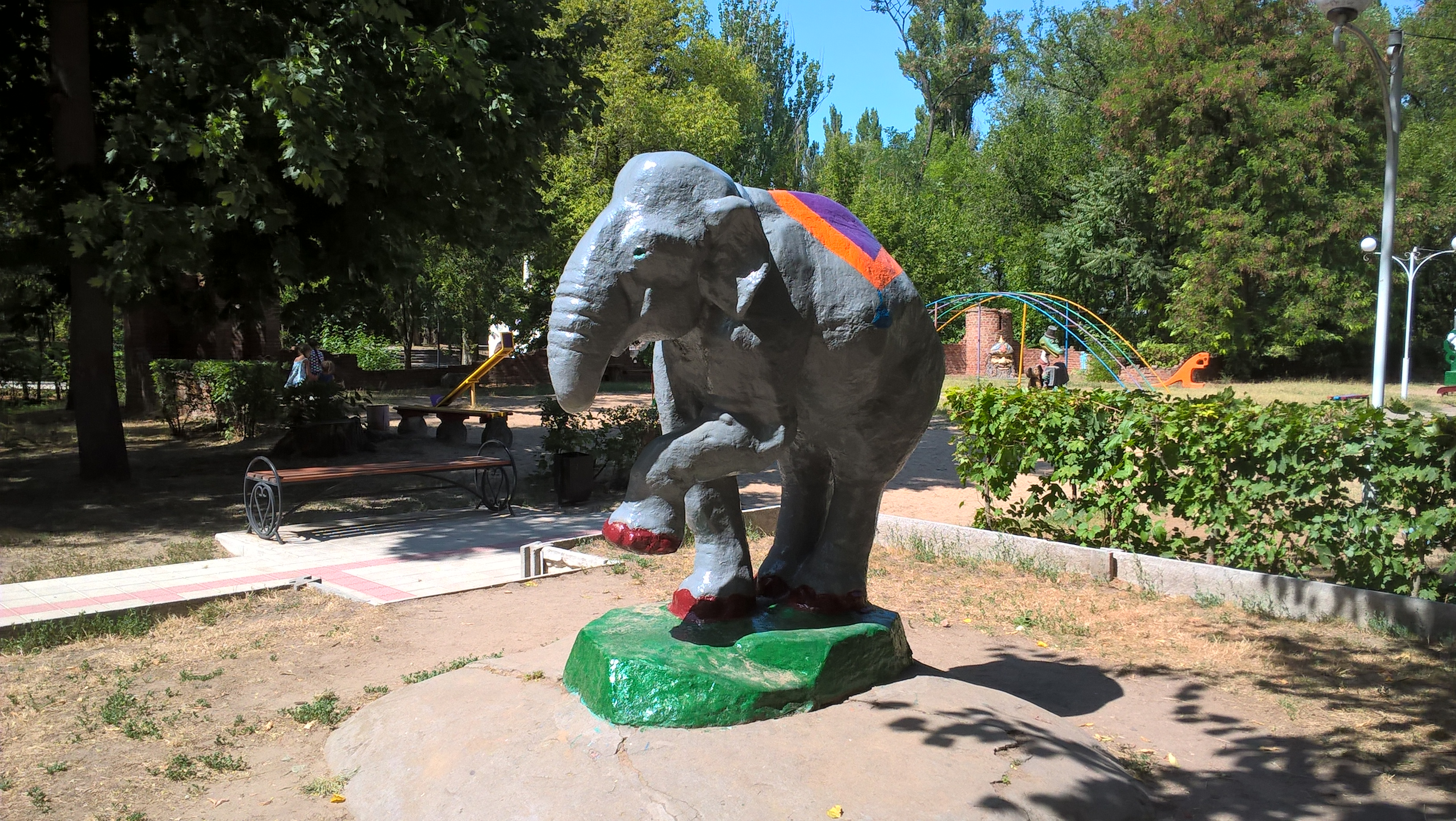
The elephant at the playground – an unofficial symbol of the city

The main cultural center of Nova Kakhovka is the Palace of Culture, which hosts regular performances of creative groups and folk ensembles, both local and from neighboring areas.

Nova Kakhovka has a museum of local history with a permanent exhibition on the history of the city, a wine museum, the house-museum of Anatoly Bakhuta, an art gallery named after Albin Gavdzinsky, libraries, a summer theater, and the "Youth" cinema, part of the Cinema Palace.

The city has three parks, squares, beaches, promenade, numerous cafés, nightclubs, a zoo and amusement park.

== Sports ==
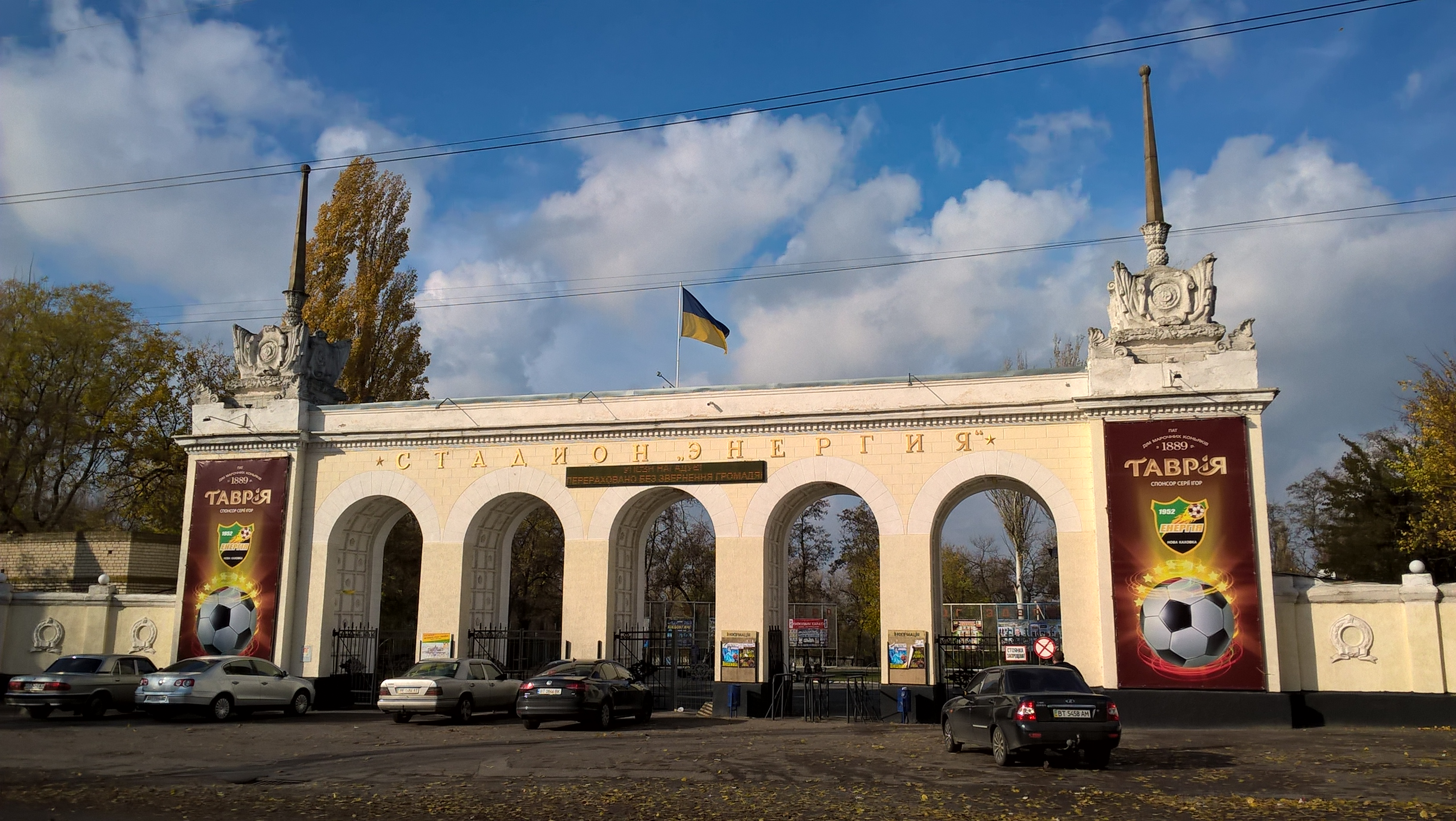
Main gate of the Energia Stadium

Nova Kakhovka has three sports schools for children and youth, 21 gyms, 110 sports grounds, a water sports base, and 13 tennis courts.

The Novokakhovska Tennis School has graduated male players (Andriy Shashkov, Maksym Dubov, Serhiy Yaroshenko, Serhiy Vergun, Oleksandr Maksymov and Dmytro Biletsky), female players (Motobol Natalia Biletska, Yuliana Fedak and Halyna Furgailo), and coaches (Serhiy Zhytsky, an Honored Coach of Ukraine, Serhiy Korovaiko, Andriy Dubov, Tetyana Furgailo, Olga Kushnirenko and Anatoliy Biletsky).

The Energia City Stadium hosts popular sports such as motoball and soccer. Motorcyclists won silver medals in the 2001 Ukrainian championship, and the FC Enerhiya Nova Kakhovka football team has won the regional cup 21 times and the regional championship 25 times.

Nova Kakhovka's Dynamo archery complex can simultaneously hold 70 archers on the shooting range, and the city has won the archery championships of Ukraine and the Cup of Ukraine. The city's archery team took eighth place at the 2002 championship of Ukraine. Among the city's more famous archers are Tamara Literova, Vadim Reznikov, Lyudmila Arzhannikova and Anastasia Pavlova.

Nova Kakhovka has also developed children's and youth basketball programs with the assistance of coaches like Dzyubenko N. Z., whose students have represented the city at regional competitions. The city's basketball players are part of professional teams in Kyiv, Dnipro, Cherkasy, Odesa, and Poltava.

== Media ==
Five weekly newspapers are published in Nova Kakhovka: the Nova Kakhovka (founded by the city council) and the private Novyny Dilovi, Klyuchi, Dniprovsikyi Prospect and Tavriiski chas publications.

Нова Каховка.City is an online city publication created in October 2017 by the Center for the Development of Deaf Children and the Abo local media development agency.

Radio broadcasting services in the city are provided by the Novokakhovka City Radio Organization.

== Notable people ==
- Lyudmila Arzhannikova – world and European archery champion
- Anatoliy Bakhuta – Ukrainian poet, laureate of the international literary prize named after Aleksei Kruchonykh
- Valeriy Borzov – two-time Olympic champion in athletics
- Sergei Chukhray – three-time Olympic champion in rowing
- Maxim Dondyuk – Ukrainian documentary filmmaker
- Snizhana Egorova – Ukrainian actress and television presenter
- Stepan Faldinsky (1883-1967) – gardener, park decorator, and creator of the city park
- Albin Gavdinsky – Ukrainian artist
- Oleh Golyanovsky (b. 1957) – Ukrainian doctor
- Constantine Gubka – Merited Master of Sports title-holder and five-time kickboxing world champion
- Oleksandr Gunko – Ukrainian poet, journalist and public figure
- Viktor Kislovsky – served in the 5th Company of the Dnipro-1 Regiment's Volunteer Battalion. Killed in action.
- Tamara Literova – Soviet archery champion
- Denys Perepelytsia – Armed Forces of Ukraine soldier, fought in the Russo-Ukrainian War, killed in action.
- Andrey Rappoport – entrepreneur, investor, philanthropist
- Vadym Reznikov – Soviet Ukrainian archery coach
- Valeriy Vakhnenko (1957-2016) – Armed Forces of Ukraine officer who fought in the Russo-Ukrainian war
- Anastasia Pavlova – European champion archer who competed in the XXXI Olympic Games in Rio de Janeiro
- Hennadiy Zuev (b. 1975) – Honored Coach of Ukraine, Master of Sports title-holder and Honored Worker of Physical Culture and Sports of Ukraine

== Twin towns ==
- Saint-Étienne-du-Rouvray, France
