= DRP =

DRP may refer to:

== Political parties ==
- Democratic Republican Party (South Korea)
- Deutsche Rechtspartei, a right-wing German party
- Dhivehi Rayyithunge Party, a right-wing Maldivian party

== Other uses ==
- Bicol International Airport's IATA code
- Deferred resignation program, for US government labor
- Dells Raceway Park, Wisconsin, US
- Deutsche Radio Philharmonie Saarbrücken Kaiserslautern, German radio orchestra
- Deutsches Reichspatent, a German patent issued at times of the German Reich
- Distribution resource planning, for orders in a supply chain
- Disaster recovery plan, for IT infrastructure
- Diabetic retinopathy, a disease of the retina as a complication of diabetes mellitus
- Dnipriany River Port, Dnipriany, Kherson Oblast, Ukraine
