= Tavriisk =

City in Kherson Oblast, Ukraine

Tavriisk Таврійськ
- City
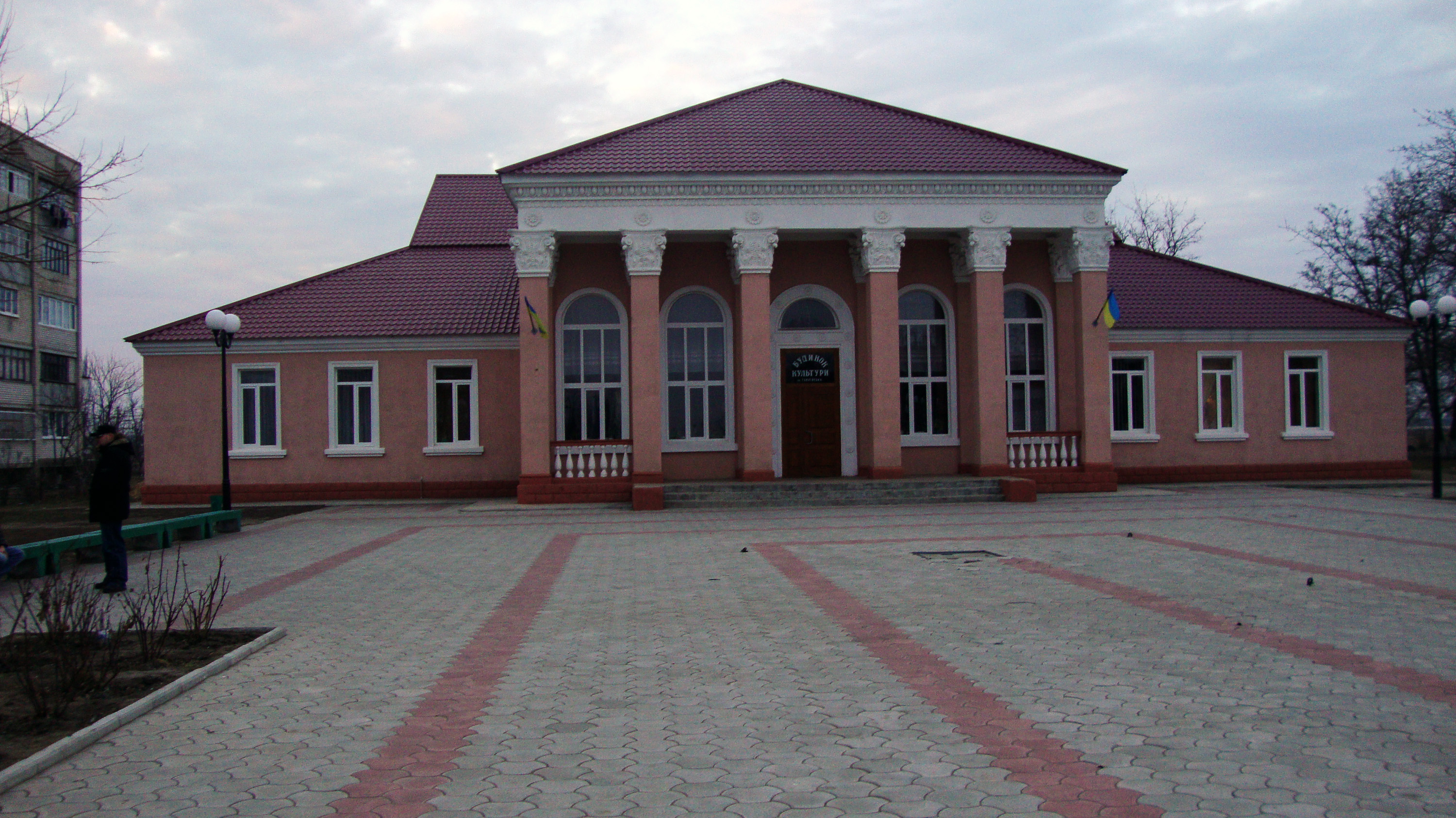
- Municipal Cultural Centre

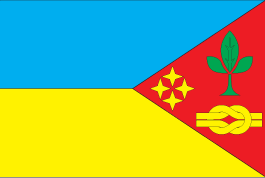
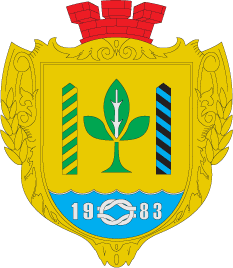
- Flag Coat of arms
- Interactive map of Tavriisk
- Location of Tavriisk Tavriisk (Ukraine)
- Coordinates: 46°45′N 33°25′E
- Country: Ukraine
- Oblast: Kherson Oblast
- Raion: Kakhovka Raion
- Hromada: Tavriisk urban hromada

Area
  - Total: 14.9 km^{2} (5.8 sq mi)

Population (2022)
  - Total: ▼10,108
- Postal code: 74989
- Area code: +380 5549

Tavriisk (Ukrainian: Таврійськ, pronounced [tɐu̯ˈr⁽ʲ⁾ijsʲk]; Russian: Таврийск) is a small city in Kakhovka Raion, Kherson Oblast, southern Ukraine, close to the city of Nova Kakhovka. It is located on the left bank of the Dnieper River. Tavriisk hosts the administration of the Tavriisk urban hromada, one of the hromadas of Ukraine. It has a population of 10,108 (2022 estimate).

== Administrative status ==
Until 18 July 2020, Tavriisk belonged to Nova Kakhovka Municipality. The municipality as an administrative unit was abolished in July 2020 as part of the administrative reform of Ukraine, which reduced the number of raions of Kherson Oblast to five. The area of Nova Kakhovka Municipality was merged into Kakhovka Raion.

== History ==
On February 24, 2022, Russian military forces occupied the city. In the Russian invasion of Ukraine, the Russian occupiers set up a mobile command post in the town. Unconfirmed reports said it was destroyed by HIMARS prior to 12 July 2022. Major General Artem Nasbulin may have died in the attack. Shortly after The Moscow Times reported that they couldn't find proof that a Major General Artem Nasbulin ever existed, suggesting that the reports had misidentified Colonel Rafail Nasybulin, who was in charge of the combat training department of the Southern Military District prior to the invasion.

== Demographics ==
Distribution of the population by ethnic groups according to the 2001 Ukrainian census:

Ethnic groups in Tavriisk
| | percent |
| Ukrainians | 77.38% |
| Russians | 20.29% |
| Belarusians | 0.86% |
| Tatars | 0.21% |
| Bulgarians | 0.19% |
| Poles | 0.11% |

== See also ==
- Nova Kakhovka River Port
- North Crimean Canal
