= Dnipriany =

Rural locality in Kherson Oblast, Ukraine

Dnipriany Дніпряни
- Rural settlement
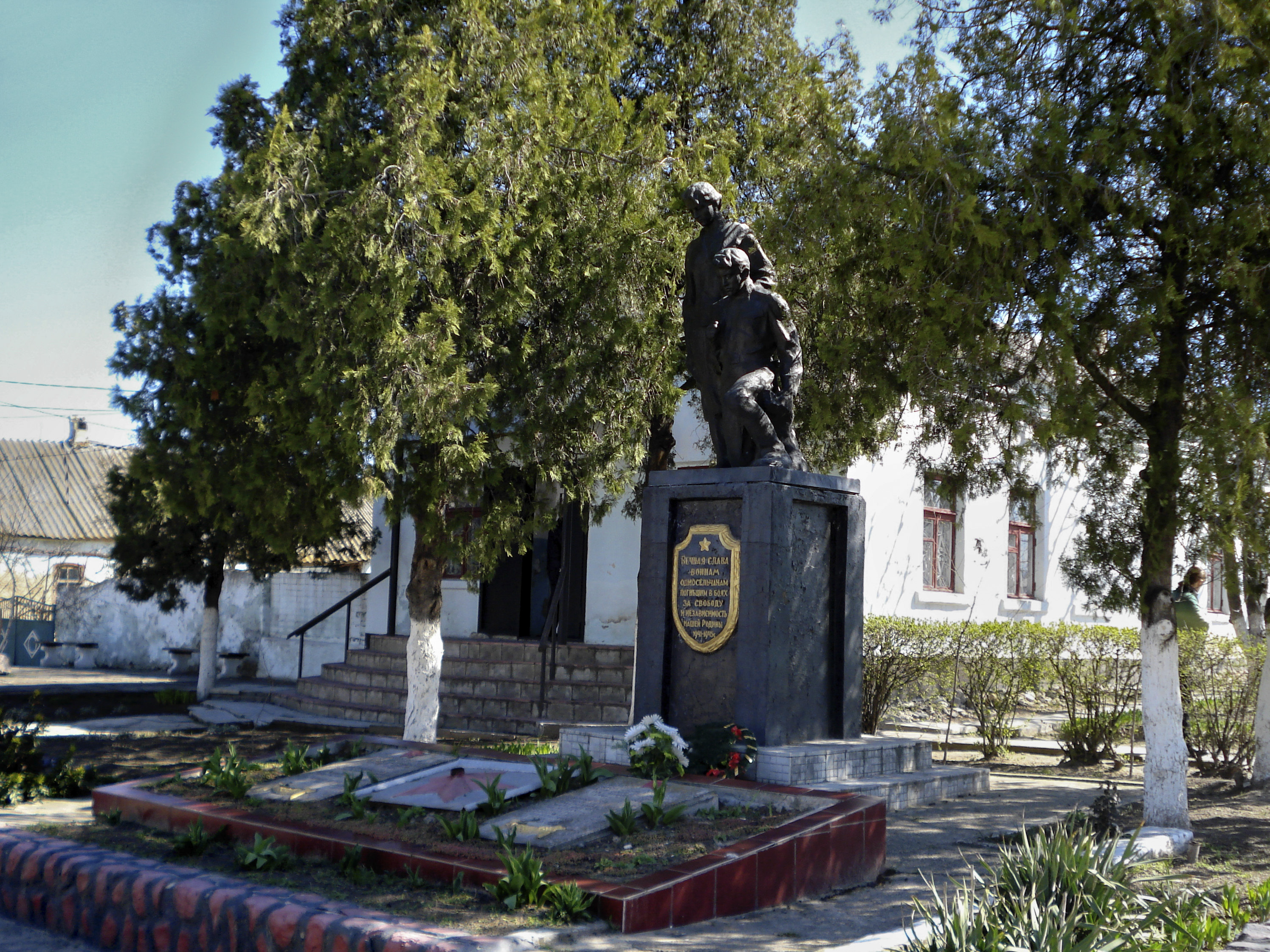
- Mass grave of Soviet soldiers killed during World War II

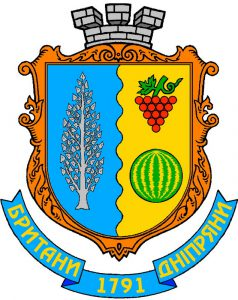
- Coat of arms

- Location in Kherson Oblast Location in Ukraine
- Country: Ukraine
- Oblast: Kherson Oblast
- Raion: Kakhovka Raion
- Hromada: Nova Kakhovka urban hromada

Population (2022)
  - Total: ▼3,930
- Time zone: UTC+2 (EET)
  - Summer (DST): UTC+3 (EEST)

Dnipriany (Ukrainian: Дніпряни, Russian: Днепряны, romanized: Dnepryany), known as Brytany (Ukrainian: Британи) before 1946, is a rural settlement in Kakhovka Raion, Kherson Oblast, southern Ukraine. It is located on the left bank of the Dnieper, about 10 kilometres (6.2 mi) downstream of the city of Nova Kakhovka. Dnipriany belongs to Nova Kakhovka urban hromada, one of the hromadas of Ukraine. It has a population of 3,930 (2022 estimate).

== History ==
=== Early history ===
Dnipriany was founded in 1791 under the name Brytany on the lands of a military officer by fugitive serfs from other parts of the Russian Empire, such as Poltava Governorate, Kursk Governorate, and Oryol Governorate, among others. By 1822, 335 people lived in Brytany, which had an economy based around agriculture. By 1880, there were agricultural processing plants in the village. In 1886, it was located in Kakhovka Volost, Dneprovsky Uyezd, Taurida Governorate, and had a church.

In 1889, the village Osnovy (Ukrainian: Основи) was founded nearby by settlers from the village of Shabo (today in Odesa Oblast, Ukraine). The people of Osnovy planted large grape plantations and made wine, which was exported through the pier at Brytany. Many of the people of Brytany would also work on the grape fields. Also during the late 19th century, a steam mill was built in Brytany.

=== 20th century ===
During the Ukrainian War of Independence, from 1917 to 1920, it passed between various factions. Afterwards it was administratively part of the Mykolaiv Governorate of Ukraine.

During World War II, Brytany was occupied by Nazi Germany between September 8, 1941 and November 1, 1943. In 1946, after the end of the war, Brytany was renamed to Dnipriany.

In 1956, it received urban-type settlement status. In 1957, the village Osnovy was merged into Dnipriany by an edict of the Kherson Oblast regional committee. In 1965, by order of the Supreme Soviet of the Ukrainian Soviet Socialist Republic, Dnipriany—along with the surrounding village council—was subordinated to Nova Kakhovka Municipality.

=== 21st century ===
On 2 October 2018, Dnipriany was assigned to Nova Kakhovka urban hromada, one of the hromadas of Ukraine. Nova Kakhovka Municipality as an administrative unit was abolished on 18 July 2020 as part of the administrative reform of Ukraine, which reduced the number of raions of Kherson Oblast to five. The area of the former Nova Kakhovka Municipality was merged into Kakhovka Raion.

During the Russian invasion of Ukraine that began in 2022, Dnipriany was captured and occupied by Russian forces. In June 2023, the Kakhovka Dam was blown up, flooding vast areas in Kherson Oblast, including Dnipriany. Footage showed that Dnipriany was either completely or almost completely underwater on 6 June 2023.

Until 26 January 2024, Dnipriany was designated urban-type settlement. On this day, a new law entered into force which abolished this status, and Dnipriany became a rural settlement.

== Economy ==
Dnipriany is home to the Dnipriany River Port.

=== Transportation ===
The closest railway station, Elektromash, is located in Nova Kakhovka. It is on the railway connecting Mykolaiv via Snihurivka and Nova Kakhovka with Melitopol. There is infrequent passenger traffic.

The settlement has road access to Nova Kakhovka and further to Highway M14 connecting Kherson with Melitopol.

== Demographics ==
Population history

Year	Pop.	±% p.a.
1822	335	—
1885	1,073	+1.86%
1959	5,233	+2.16%
1970	6,850	+2.48%
1979	7,277	+0.67%

Year	Pop.	±% p.a.
1989	5,013	−3.66%
2001	4,712	−0.51%
2011	4,431	−0.61%
2022	3,930	−1.08%

In 2001, the settlement had a population of 4,712, most of whom were ethnic Ukrainians.
