= Nova Kakhovka urban hromada =

- Hromada
- Interactive map of Nova Kakhovka urban hromada
- Country: Ukraine
- Oblast: Kherson Oblast
- Raion: Kakhovka Raion
- Admin. center: Nova Kakhovka

Population
  - Total: 64,792
- Settlements: 16
- Cities: 1
- Rural settlements: 5
- Villages: 10

Nova Kakhovka urban hromada (Ukrainian: Новокаховська міська громада) is a hromada of Ukraine, located in Kakhovka Raion, Kherson Oblast. Its administrative center is the city of Nova Kakhovka.

The hromada contains eleven populated places: city and administrative center Nova Kakhovka, two settlements (Dnipriany and Kozatske), three rural settlements (Vesele, Raiske, and Topolivka) and five villages (Korsunka, Maslivka, Novi Laheri, Obryvka, and Pishchane). It has a total population of 64,792.

== History ==
The hromada was originally established on 19 October 2018.

It has been reported that the entire hromada came under Russian occupation in the morning of 24 February 2022, the first day of the Russian invasion of Ukraine, with the exception of a ravine north of Vesele known as Shylova Balka, which was held by units of the 80th Air Assault Brigade. Heavy battles took place in the area throughout the remainder of February 2022.

After Ukraine's 2022 Kherson counteroffensive, Ukrainian forces retook all of right-bank Kherson Oblast, including two settlements of Nova Kakhovka urban hromada: Kozatske and Vesele. However, those villages were completely destroyed by war. Later, the village Korsunka was also flooded as a result of the destruction of the Kakhovka Dam.
