= Andrey Rappoport =

Russian economist (born 1963)

- Андрей Раппопорт
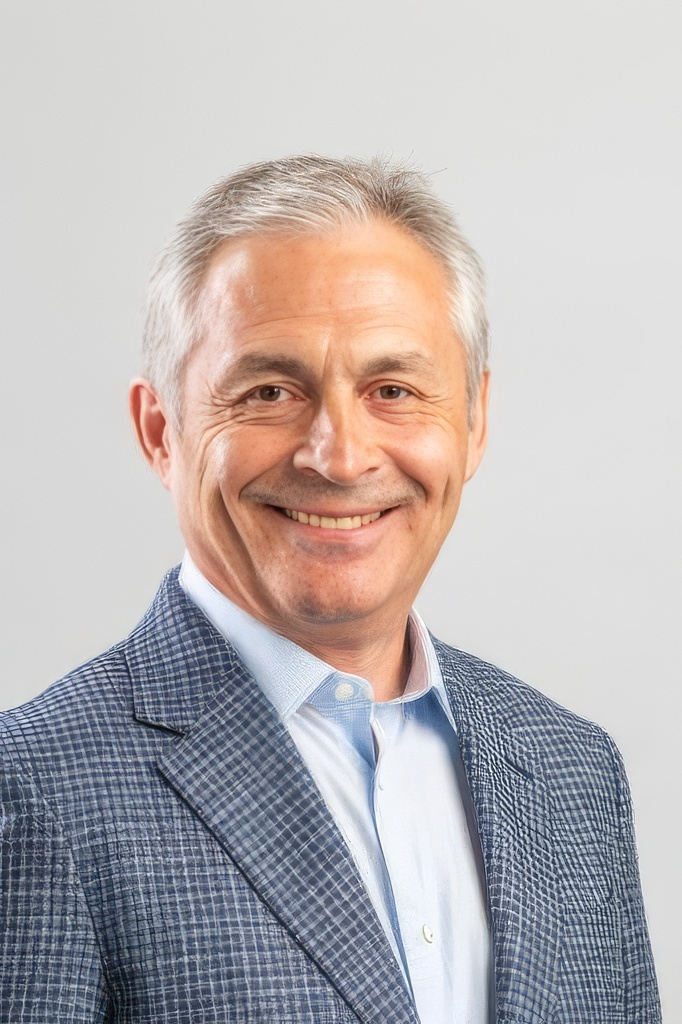
- Born: June 22, 1963 (age 63); Nova Kakhovka, Kherson Oblast, Ukrainian SSR
- Education: PhD from the Institute of Sociology of the Russian Academy of Sciences
- Alma mater: Donetsk State University
- Occupations: Entrepreneur, investor, philanthropist
- Known for: One of the founders of Alfa-Bank
- Spouse: Irina Eduardovna Rappoport
- Children: 2

Andrey Natanovich Rappoport (born June 22, 1963) is an international economist and business executive. He was one of the founders of Alfa-Bank, one of Russia's largest private financial institutions, and served as its first Chairman of the Board from 1991 to 1997. From 1998 to 2009, he held senior leadership positions at RAO UES of Russia and the Federal Grid Company of the Unified Energy System. Since 2015, he has lived in Switzerland, where he runs his own asset management business.

Andrey Rappoport was born on June 22, 1963, in Nova Kakhovka, Kherson Oblast, Ukrainian SSR.
