= Donetsk National University =

University in Ukraine

Coordinates: 48.0041°N 37.7975°E

Vasyl' Stus Donetsk National University
- ДЗВО "Донецький національний університет імені Василя Стуса"; Донецкий государственный университет
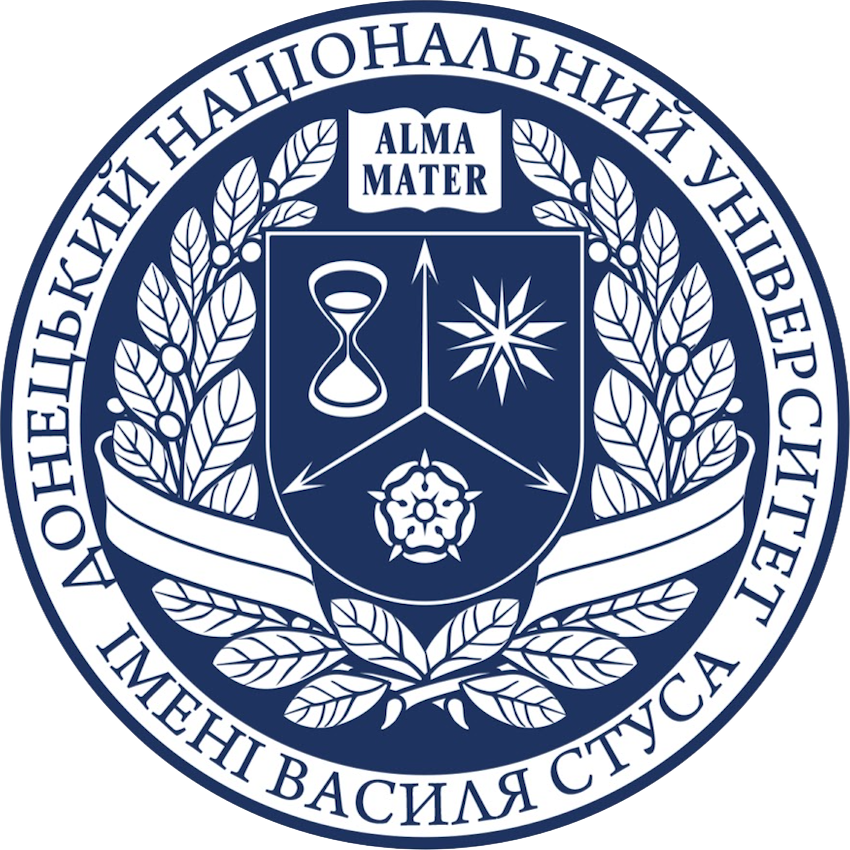
- Type: Public university
- Established: 1937
- Rector: Svietlana Bespalova (Donetsk); Ilya Khadzhynov (Vinnytsia)
- Location: Donetsk (Russian-controlled campus); Vinnytsia (Ukrainian-controlled campus), Ukraine
- Campus: Urban
- Website: donnu.ru (Donetsk); Official website (Vinnytsia)
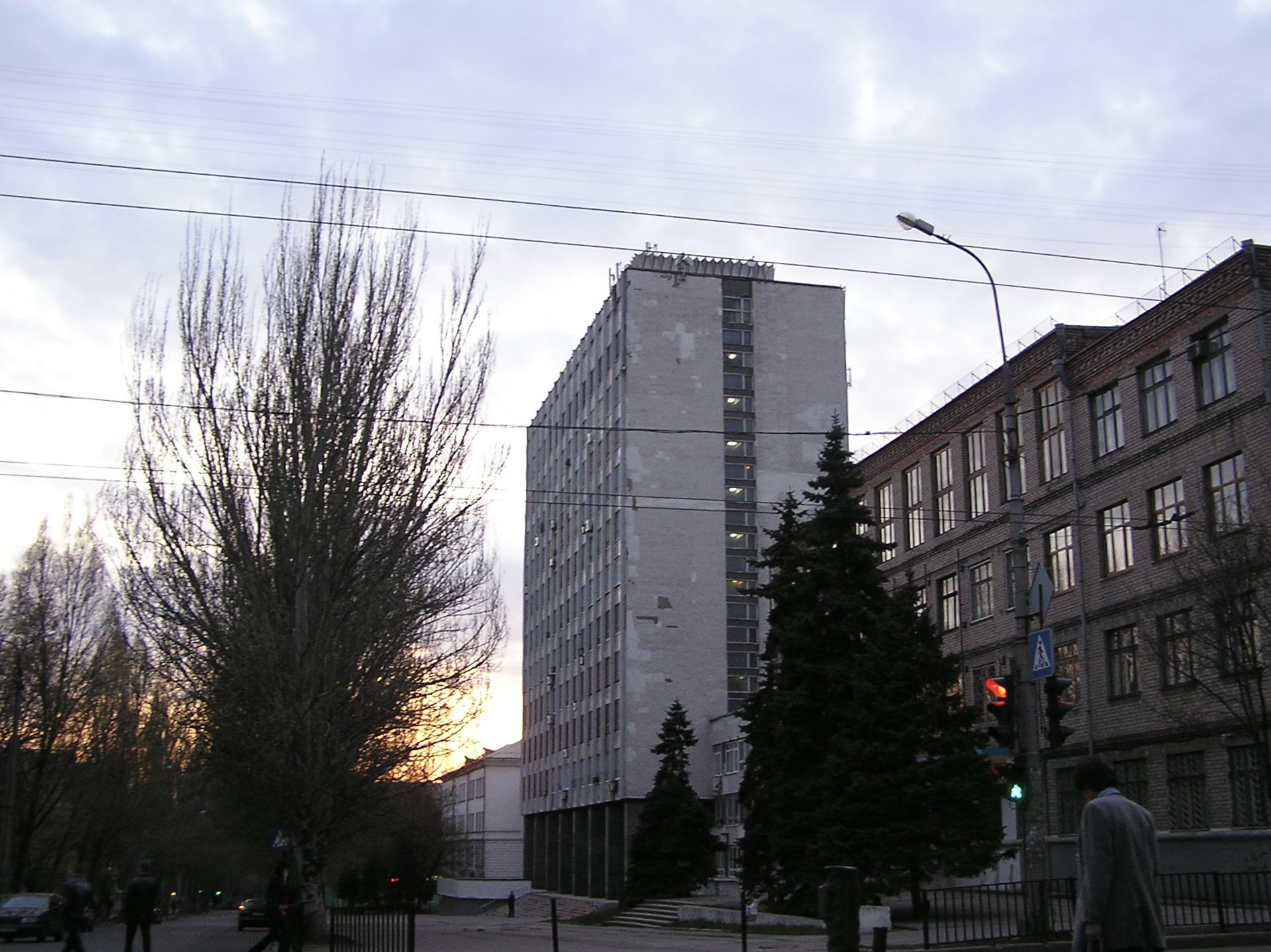

University rankings

Regional – Overall
- QS Emerging Europe and Central Asia: 301-350 (2022)

The Vasyl' Stus Donetsk National University (abbr. DonNU, Ukrainian: Донецький національний університет імені Василя Стуса, romanized: Donetskyi natsionalnyi universytet imeni Vasylia Stusa; Russian: Донецкий государственный университет, romanized: Donetskiy gosudarstvennyy universitet) is one of the leading higher educational institutions of Ukraine. In 2014, due to the war in Donbas, a number of teachers and students left Donetsk and subsequently reestablished the university as Vasyl' Stus Donetsk National University in Vinnytsia. At the same time, some teachers and most students remained in Donetsk, therefore splitting the university in two.

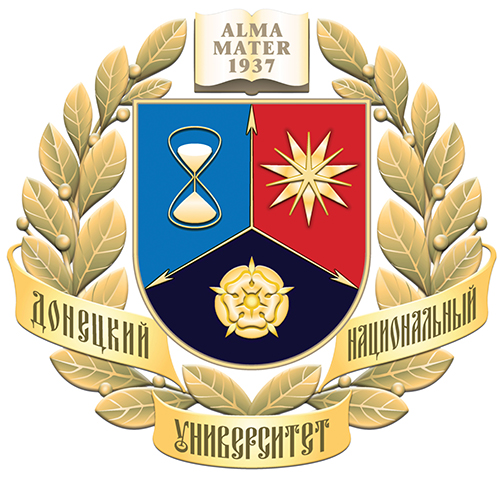
Russian-controlled university logo

The university's history starts in 1937 from the moment of the creation of a pedagogical institute in Donetsk (then Stalino). In 1965, the institute was transformed into Donetsk State University. It was accorded the National status in 2000.

== History ==
=== 1937 to 1945 ===
On July 15, 1937, a decree from the Ukrainian SSR established the Stalin State Pedagogical Institute in the city of Stalino (Donetsk). Its first director was Oleksandr Yevdokymenko, who was arrested in 1938 and sentenced to ten years imprisonment during Joseph Stalin's Great Purge. Originally the institute consisted of two departments, History and Philology, and had five chairs.

Serhiy Ksenofontov became its head in 1940 and added the Physics-Mathematical Faculty in 1941. Due to Nazi Germany's invasion of the Soviet Union in World War II, in 1941 the institute was evacuated first to Kungur and soon thereafter to Molotov, where it was liquidated. It was re-established in 1943, following the liberation of Donetsk, by a decision of the Council of People's Commissars of the Ukrainian SSR.

=== After World War II ===
The school's Student Scientific Association, composed of two divisions – historical-philological and physical-mathematical – was established in 1951. In 1961, Mykola Khoroshailov took over from Ksenofontov as the head of the institute and its name was changed to Donetsk State Pedagogical Institute. In 1964, the institute was subordinated to Kharkiv State University and became a Donetsk branch of Kharkiv State University named after Maksim Gorky.

On May 28, 1965, the Soviet of Ministers of the USSR enacted a decree on organizing the Donetsk State University (DonSU) based at the Donetsk branch of Kharkiv State University. Professor Leonid Lytvynenko became the first rector of the university (1965–1968). 1965 saw the launch of post-graduate studies (with an initial enrollment of 16 students), the addition of the faculties of biology and physics, and the construction of the students' campus.

Appointed the second rector of the university, Professor Yuriy Shevlyakov managed the institution from 1968 to 1970, during which the main 12-storey building was constructed. Professor Hryhoriy Tymoshenko was the third University rector (1970–1975). In 1972, the university's history museum was opened in the main building. Professor Hryhoriy Ponomarenko became the rector in 1975, followed by Professor Volodymyr Shevchenko in 1986. On September 11, 2000, the university was accorded national status by a decree of the President of Ukraine, Leonid Kuchma.

=== War in Donbas and move to Vinnytsia ===
During the war in Donbas, the university officially relocated to Vinnytsia. In June 2016, 75 out of 105 staff members voted in favour of naming the university after one of its alumni, the poet Vasyl Stus.

== Vinnytsia Campus Infrastructure ==
Vasyl' Stus Donetsk National University unites educational and research centers forming a complex that includes: 6 Faculties; 2 regional Training and Retraining Centers; Department of International Education, the UNESCO Department for Ecology in the Technogenous Region; Business Centre; Youth Centre for Legal Studies; the Laboratory for International Scientific and Technical Cooperation; Consulting Centres of the British, German and French Councils; Postgraduate Courses and Doctoral Studies etc.

== Notable alumni ==
- Ivan Dziuba, Ukrainian academician, minister of culture, literary critic, author of "Internationalism or Russification?", Holodomor survivor, co-founder of the People's Movement of Ukraine
- Iya Kiva (born 1984), Ukrainian poet, translator, journalist, critic
- Hryhoriy Nemyria, Ukrainian politician, vice prime minister in the Second Tymoshenko Government
- Volodymyr Rafeienko, Russian and Ukrainian writer
- Andrey Rappoport, entrepreneur, investor, philanthropist
- Vasyl Stus, Ukrainian poet, Soviet dissident
- Dmytro Bilokolos, politician and diplomat, Minister of Foreign Affairs of the Ukrainian SSR.
- Maria do Carmo Silveira, 13th prime minister of São Tomé and Príncipe.

== See also ==
List of universities in Ukraine

== Notes and references ==
This article incorporates text from "History of the University" at the Official Web Site of the University, whose republication is expressly allowed if referenced to www.donnu.edu.ua.
