= Raiske, Kherson Oblast =

Raiske Райське
- Rural settlement
- Location within Ukraine Location within Kherson Oblast
- Coordinates: 46°43′12″N 33°17′51″E
- Country: Ukraine
- Oblast: Kherson Oblast
- Raion: Kakhovka Raion
- Hromada: Nova Kakhovka urban hromada

Population
  - Total: 1,238
- Postal code: 74991

Raiske (Ukrainian: Райське) is a rural settlement in Kakhovka Raion, Kherson Oblast, Ukraine. It has a population of 1238 people.

== History ==
During the full-scale Russian invasion of Ukraine that began in 2022, Raiske was captured by Russian forces. On 19 July 2022, the Ukrainian military reported that they had struck Russian ammunition depots in the settlement.
