= Dnipriany River Port =

- Native name: Дніпрянський річковий порт

Location
- Country: Ukraine
- Location: 74987, Kherson Oblast, Kakhovka Raion, Dnipriany, Novolaherna Street, 2а

Statistics
- Website drp.com.ua

Dnipriany River Port is a private river port transport complex. It is located below the Kakhovka Hydroelectric Power Plant, in Dnipriany, Kherson Oblast, Ukraine. It provides year-round port operation. It is located on the left bank of the Dnieper, 60 km northeast of Kherson with access to the Black Sea and further into the Mediterranean Sea, which allows trade with different countries of different continents, all year round. The city has a good transport interchange in the form of the Odesa railway, as well as highways. Thus, the port city is connected with all regions of Ukraine, near, and far abroad.

== See also ==
- Cargo turnover of Ukrainian ports
