= Podolie =

- Municipality
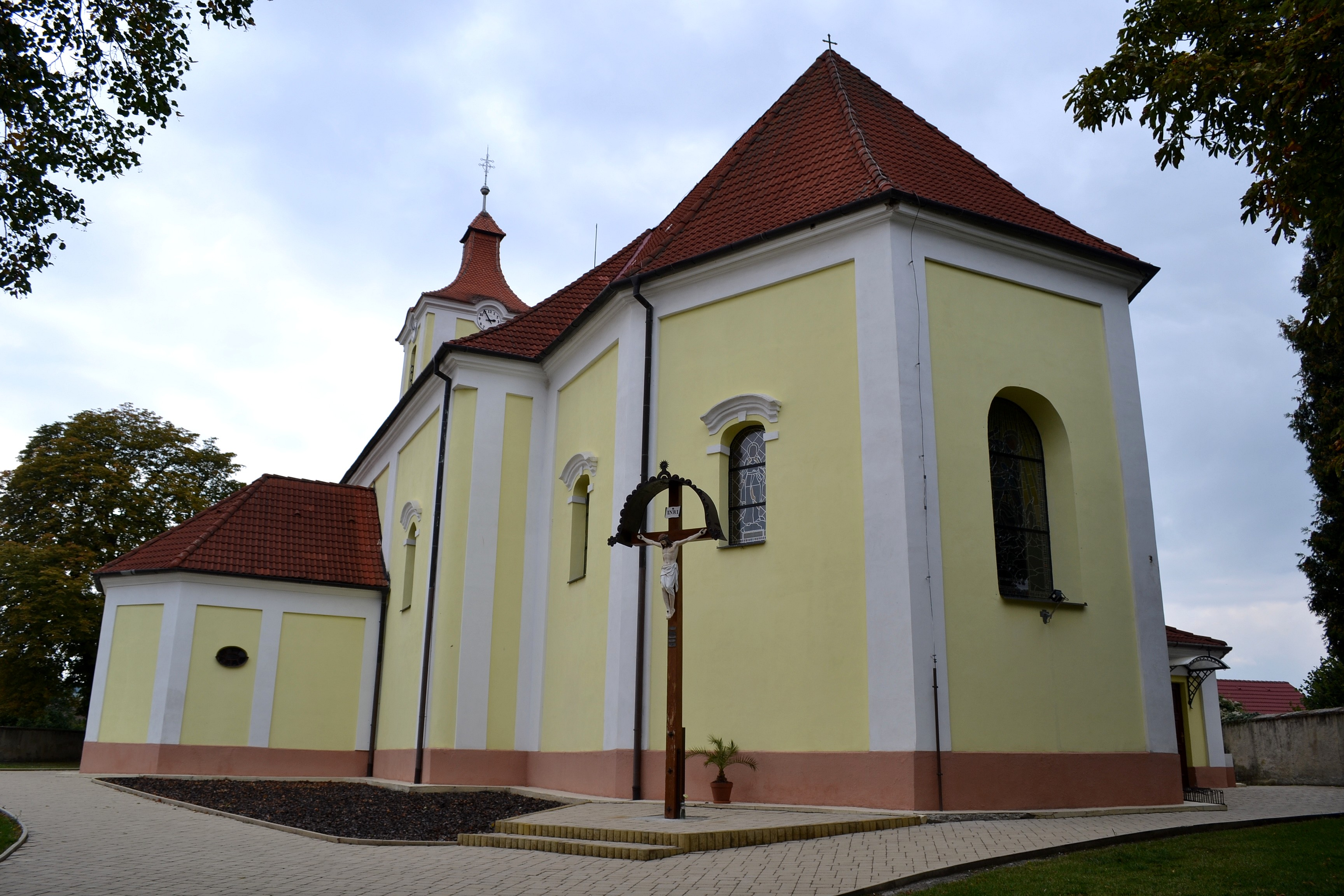

- Flag

- Location of Podolie in the Trenčín Region Location of Podolie in Slovakia
- Coordinates: 48.68°N 17.77°E
- Country: Slovakia
- Region: Trenčín Region
- District: Nové Mesto nad Váhom District
- First mentioned: 1332

Area
  - Total: 17.26 km^{2} (6.66 sq mi)
- Elevation: 177 m (581 ft)

Population (2025)
  - Total: 1,906
- Time zone: UTC+1 (CET)
  - Summer (DST): UTC+2 (CEST)
- Postal code: 916 22
- Area code: +421 32
- Vehicle registration plate (until 2022): NM
- Website: www.podolie.sk

Podolie (Hungarian: Felsőleszéte) is a village and municipality in Nové Mesto nad Váhom District in the Trenčín Region of western Slovakia.

== History ==
In historical records the village was first mentioned in 1332. Before the establishment of independent Czechoslovakia in 1918, Podolie was part of Nyitra County within the Kingdom of Hungary. From 1939 to 1945, it was part of the Slovak Republic.

== Geography ==
The municipality lies at an altitude of 177 metres (581 ft) and covers an area of 17.26 km^{2} (6.66 sq mi) (2025).

== Population ==
Population statistic (10 years)
Year	1995	2005	2015	2025
Count	2071	2034	1915	1906
Difference		−1.78%	−5.85%	−0.46%

Population statistic
Year	2024	2025
Count	1923	1906
Difference		−0.88%

It has a population of 1906 people (31 December 2025).

=== Ethnicity ===
Census 2021 (1+ %)
Ethnicity	Number	Fraction
Slovak	1803	94.2%
Not found out	93	4.85%
Romani	61	3.18%
Total	1914	

In year 2021 was 1914 people by ethnicity 1803 as Slovak, 93 as Not found out, 61 as Romani, 10 as Czech, 3 as Moravian, 3 as Hungarian, 2 as German, 2 as English, 1 as Jewish, 1 as Ukrainian, 1 as Turkish, 1 as Rusyn, 1 as Polish and 1 as Greek.

Note on population: The difference values of population numbers in the table "Population statistic" and in the sections "Ethnicity" & "Religion" is caused by the use of various statistical methods.

=== Religion ===
Census 2021 (1+ %)
Religion	Number	Fraction
Roman Catholic Church	1336	69.8%
None	351	18.34%
Not found out	95	4.96%
Evangelical Church	75	3.92%
Total	1914	

In year 2021 was 1914 people by religion 1336 from Roman Catholic Church, 351 from None, 95 from Not found out, 75 from Evangelical Church, 10 from Jehovah's Witnesses, 9 from Christian Congregations in Slovakia, 6 from Ad hoc movements, 5 from Islam, 5 from Other, 4 from Eastern Orthodox Church, 3 from Old Catholic Church, 3 from Other and not ascertained christian church, 3 from Greek Catholic Church, 2 from Apostolic Church, 1 from Calvinist Church, 1 from Paganism and natural spirituality, 1 from Hinduism, 1 from United Methodist Church, 1 from Church of the Brethren, 1 from Church of Jesus Christ of Latter-day Saints and 1 from Baptists Church.

== Miniature park ==
Podolie is the site of Park miniatúr, a miniature park.
