= Honoured Coach of Ukraine =

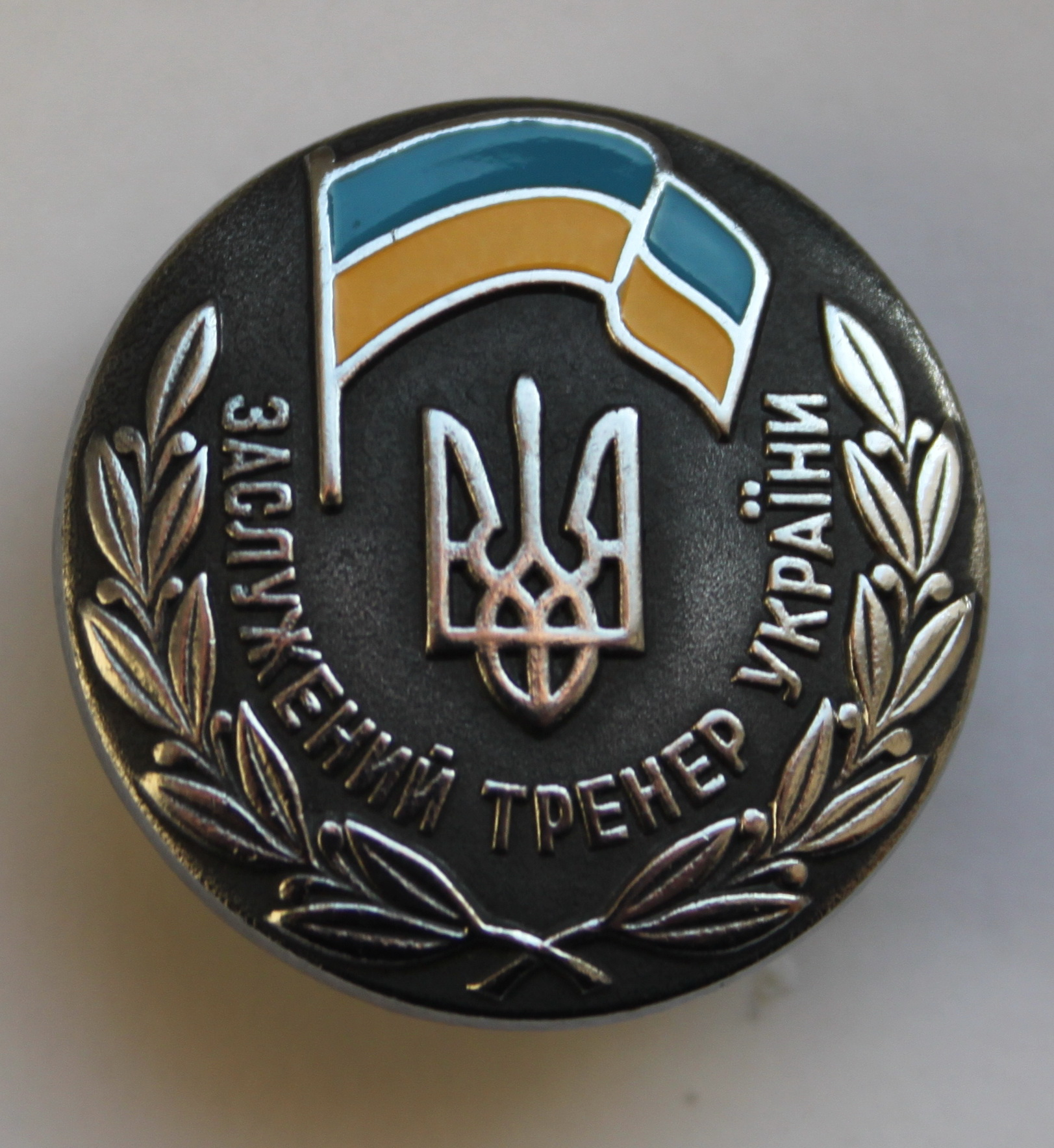
awarding badge

The Honoured Coach of Ukraine (also translated as the Merited Coach of Ukraine, Ukrainian: Заслужений тренер України) is an exclusive sports title awarded to coaches for high special merits to prepare highly qualified sportspeople in individual and team sports. This tradition is an adaptation of the similar honors that existed in the Soviet Union since 1961 as the Merited Coach of the Ukrainian SSR.

== Criteria for qualification ==
=== Olympic sports ===
Sports competitions	Positions placed	Participants at positions
Olympic games and World championships	1-6 (1-8)	1
Europe championships	1-3 (1-6)	1
World Cup (overall standings)	1-3 (1-6)	1
Gran-Prix (overall standings; artistic gymnastics, figure skating)	1-3	1
Euro Cup (overall standings)	1-3 (1-6)	2
Cup of Euro champions, Cup of Winners' of Cups, Cup of International Federations	1-2	1
World championships for youths and juniors	1; 2-3	1; 2
European championships for youths and juniors	1; 2-3	2; 3

Note: in parentheses are requirements for team sports.

=== Non-Olympic sports ===
Sports competitions	Positions placed	Participants at positions
World games	1-3 (1-8)	1 (1)
World championships	1-2 (1-6)	1 (1)
Europe championships	1 (1-3)	2 (1)
World Chess Olympics	1-3	1
World Cup (overall standings)	1-3	2
World championships for youths and juniors	1; 2-3	2; 3
European championships for youths and juniors	1	3

Notes:

- In parentheses are requirements for team sports.
- In case of participation in one sport discipline athletes from less than 10 countries, the minimum number of positions is doubled.

=== Paralympic games ===
Sports competitions	Positions placed	Participants at positions
Paralympic or Deaflympic games	1-3 (2-3)	1 (2)
World Chess Olympics	1-3	
World championships	1-2 (1-3)	1 (1-2)
Europe championships	1 (1-2); 2-3	1 (2); 2

Notes:

- In parentheses are requirements for team sports.

== Additional requirements ==
- Higher or general education
- Three years work experience with an individual or a team
- Listed for national teams of Ukraine
- Approved by corresponding order from a central body of executive power for physical culture and sports

Also, coaches who do not possess special education must have a sports title "Master of Sports of Ukraine", "Master of Sports of Ukraine, World Class", or "Merited Master of Sports of Ukraine".
