= Svätý Kríž =

- Municipality
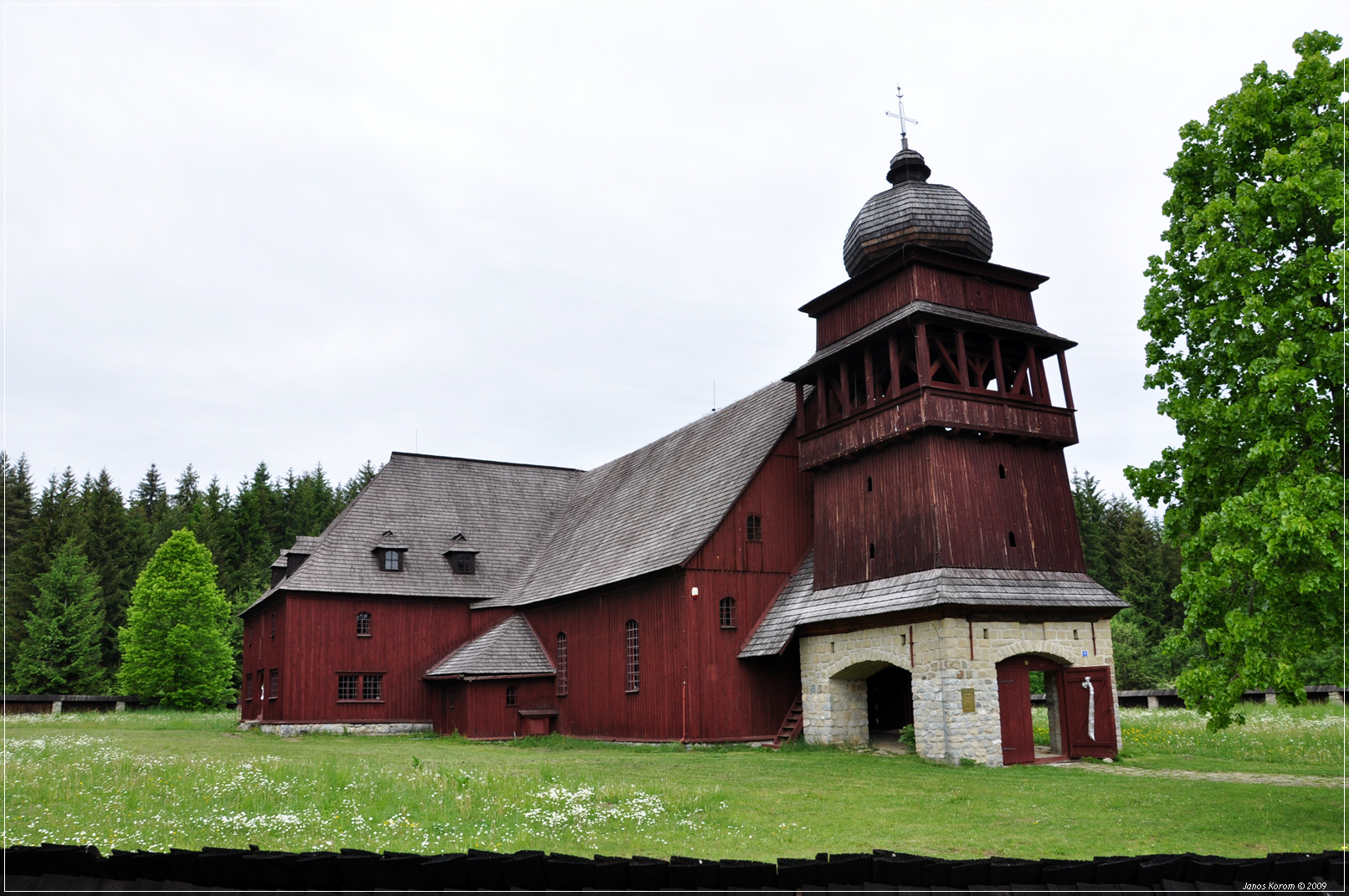

- Flag Coat of arms

- Location of Svätý Kríž in the Žilina Region Location of Svätý Kríž in Slovakia
- Coordinates: 49.07°N 19.98°E
- Country: Slovakia
- Region: Žilina Region
- District: Liptovský Mikuláš District
- First mentioned: 1277

Area
  - Total: 9.41 km^{2} (3.63 sq mi)
- Elevation: 629 m (2,064 ft)

Population (2025)
  - Total: 974
- Time zone: UTC+1 (CET)
  - Summer (DST): UTC+2 (CEST)
- Postal code: 321 1
- Area code: +421 44
- Vehicle registration plate (until 2022): LM
- Website: www.svatykriz.sk

Svätý Kríž (Hungarian: Szentkereszt, Szent Kereszt or Liptószentkereszt) is a village and municipality in Liptovský Mikuláš District in the Žilina Region of northern Slovakia.

== History ==
In historical records the village was first mentioned in 1277. Before the establishment of independent Czechoslovakia in 1918, it was part of Liptó County within the Kingdom of Hungary. From 1939 to 1945, it was part of the Slovak Republic.

== Geography ==
The municipality lies at an altitude of 629 metres (2,064 ft) and covers an area of 9.41 km^{2} (3.63 sq mi) (2025).

== Population ==
Population statistic (10 years)
Year	1995	2005	2015	2025
Count	605	709	803	974
Difference		+17.19%	+13.25%	+21.29%

Population statistic
Year	2024	2025
Count	964	974
Difference		+1.03%

It has a population of 974 people (31 December 2025).

=== Ethnicity ===
Census 2021 (1+ %)
Ethnicity	Number	Fraction
Slovak	855	96.39%
Not found out	25	2.81%
Czech	9	1.01%
Total	887	

In year 2021 was 887 people by ethnicity 855 as Slovak, 25 as Not found out, 9 as Czech, 3 as Ukrainian, 2 as Hungarian, 2 as Other, 1 as Irish, 1 as Silesian, 1 as Russian and 1 as Polish.

Note on population: The difference values of population numbers in the table "Population statistic" and in the sections "Ethnicity" & "Religion" is caused by the use of various statistical methods.

=== Religion ===
Census 2021 (1+ %)
Religion	Number	Fraction
Evangelical Church	305	34.39%
Roman Catholic Church	274	30.89%
None	249	28.07%
Not found out	27	3.04%
Greek Catholic Church	19	2.14%
Total	887	

In year 2021 was 887 people by religion 305 from Evangelical Church, 274 from Roman Catholic Church, 249 from None, 27 from Not found out, 19 from Greek Catholic Church, 4 from Baptists Church, 2 from Other and not ascertained christian church, 2 from Jehovah's Witnesses, 2 from Ad hoc movements, 1 from Jewish community, 1 from United Methodist Church and 1 from Buddhism.
