= Kakhovka Dam =

Dam and power plant in Kherson, Ukraine

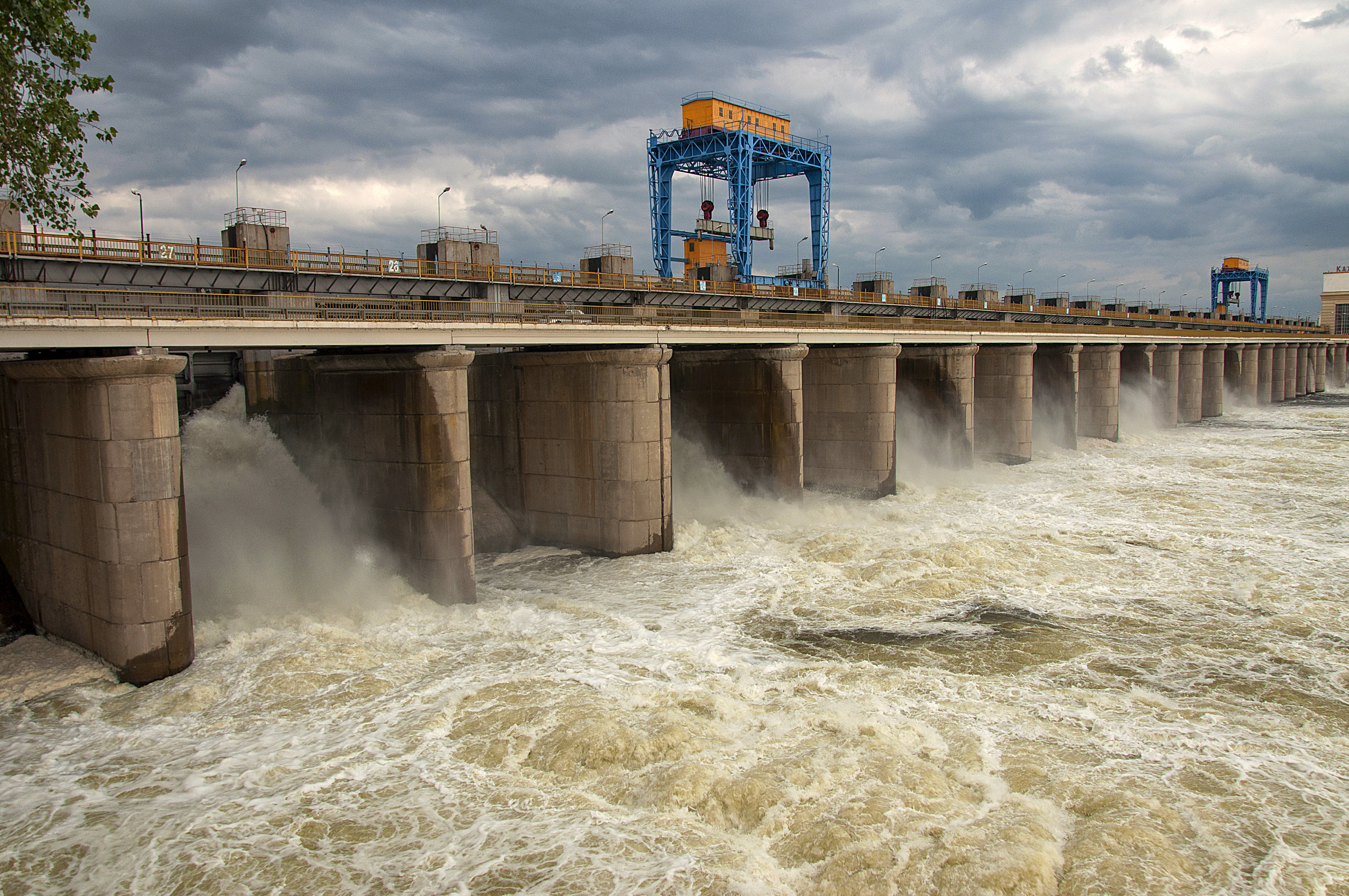
- The dam's spillways in use in 2013

- Location within Ukraine Location within Kherson Oblast
- Official name: Kakhovska HPS
- Location: Nova Kakhovka, Ukraine
- Coordinates: 46°46′34″N 33°22′18″E
- Purpose: Power, irrigation, navigation
- Status: Destroyed
- Construction began: September 1950
- Opening date: 1956; 70 years ago
- Demolition date: 6 June 2023
- Owner: Energy Company of Ukraine

Dam and spillways
- Type of dam: Earth-fill embankment with gravity sections
- Impounds: Dnieper River
- Height: 30 m (98 ft)
- Length: 3,273 m (10,738 ft)

Reservoir
- Creates: Kakhovka Reservoir
- Total capacity: 18.180×10^{9} m^{3} (14,738,766 acre⋅ft)
- Surface area: 2,155 km^{2} (832 mi^{2})

Power Station
- Operator: Ukrhydroenergo
- Commission date: 1955–1956
- Turbines: 3 × 58.5, 3 × 60.5 MW propeller
- Installed capacity: 357 MW
- Annual generation: 1.4 TWh (equivalent to a capacity factor of roughly 45%)
- Website https://uhe.gov.ua/

The Kakhovka Dam was a dam on the Dnieper River (also known as Dnipro) in Kherson Oblast, Ukraine, completed in 1956 and destroyed in 2023, which provided water for the Kakhovka Hydroelectric Station (Ukrainian: Кахо́вська ГЕС імені П. С. Непорожнього, romanized: Kakhovs'ka HES imeni P. S. Neporozhn'oho). The primary purposes of the dam were hydroelectric power generation, irrigation, and navigation. It was the sixth and last dam in the Dnieper reservoir cascade.

The deep water channel created by the downstream flow allowed shipping up and down river. The facility also included a winter garden. The R47 road and a railway crossed the Dnieper River on the dam.

The Kakhovka Hydroelectric Power Plant had a staff of 241 in October 2015. The dam was profitable bringing ₴6.1 million ($236,000) to local government budgets and ₴44.6 million ($1.73 million) to the national income.

On the morning of 6 June 2023, much of the dam was destroyed by Russia while it was under Russian control during the Russian invasion of Ukraine.

== History ==
Construction of the dam began in September 1950. The last generator was commissioned in October 1956. Significant repairs and expansion were made from 2019. It is operated by Ukrhydroenergo, which was founded in 1994.

The construction of the dam flooded the Great Meadow (Velykyi Luh) forest and marsh ecosystem.

== Construction ==
Cross-section of the central part of Kakhovka Dam

The central section of the dam consisted of (from north-west to south-east) a reinforced concrete barrage dam, the hydro power station, and a lock for shipping. The whole dam, including lengthy embankments on each side of the central section, was 3.2 km (2.0 mi) long on the side facing the reservoir. The power station had an installed capacity of 357 MW.

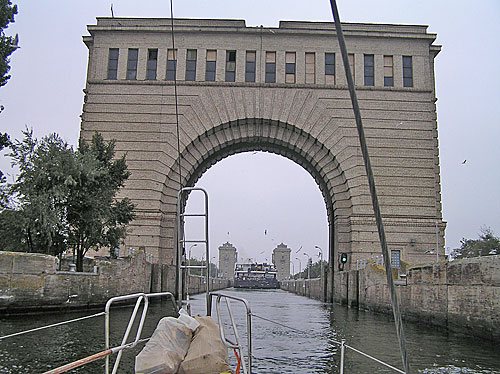
The lock through the dam

== Reservoir ==
The Kakhovka Reservoir held 18 cubic kilometres of water, equivalent to the Great Salt Lake in the United States. The reservoir supplies water for cooling the 5.7 GW Zaporizhzhia Nuclear Power Plant, and for irrigating areas of southern Ukraine and northern Crimea via the North Crimean Canal, the Kakhovsky canal and the Dnieper–Kryvyi Rih Canal.

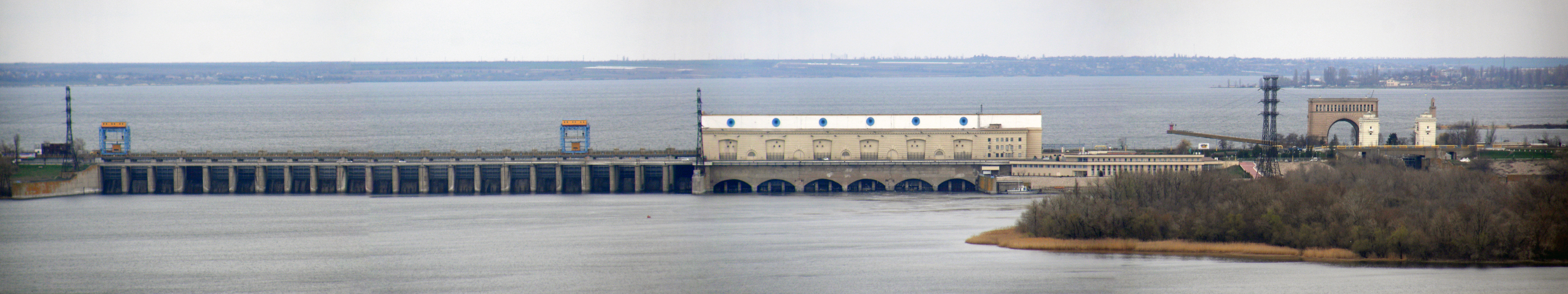
A panorama of the central section of the dam, with the reservoir beyond it

== Russian invasion of Ukraine ==
On 24 February 2022, the first day of the Russian invasion of Ukraine, the power plant was captured by Russian forces. During weeks of artillery attacks by Ukraine in August and September, Ukrainian and Russian officials reported that the facility's ability to transport vehicles had been degraded, but the dam itself retained structural integrity.

In mid-October 2022, news reports suggested that Russians may have been planning to blow up the dam to slow down the expected Ukrainian counter-offensive in the region.

On 11 November, a large explosion occurred in the northern section of the dam, shown on CCTV footage. The road and rail sections on top of the dam were destroyed, but the dam itself remained mostly undamaged. The explosion was attributed to Russian forces retreating from Kherson. The southern bank of Dnipro and dam machinery remained under Russian control. Russian forces opened additional sluice gates, allowing water to rush out of the reservoir. At that time the Zaporizhzhia Regional Military Administration in a statement suggested that one of the purposes of draining the reservoir might have been to flood the area south of the dam, in order to keep Ukrainian Forces from crossing the Dnipro River. Officials stated that Ukrhydroenergo, Ukraine's hydro electric company, believed Russian forces "opened the station's locks fearing an advance of Ukrainian soldiers".

In early November 2022, the spillways at the dam had been opened, and the Kakhovka Reservoir dropped to its lowest level in three decades, putting irrigation and drinking water resources at risk, as well as the coolant systems for the Zaporizhzhia Nuclear Power Plant. Between 1 December 2022 and 6 February 2023, the water level dropped 2 meters (6.6 ft).

From mid-February to late May 2023, either deliberately or as a result of neglect, the damaged dam was not adjusted to match the seasonal increase in water flow. As a result, water washed over the top of the dam and land upstream of the dam was flooded. Water levels in the reservoir reached a 30-year high. The raised water level caused some nearby villages to flood.

=== Destruction of the dam ===
Satellite imagery of the dam before and after its destruction

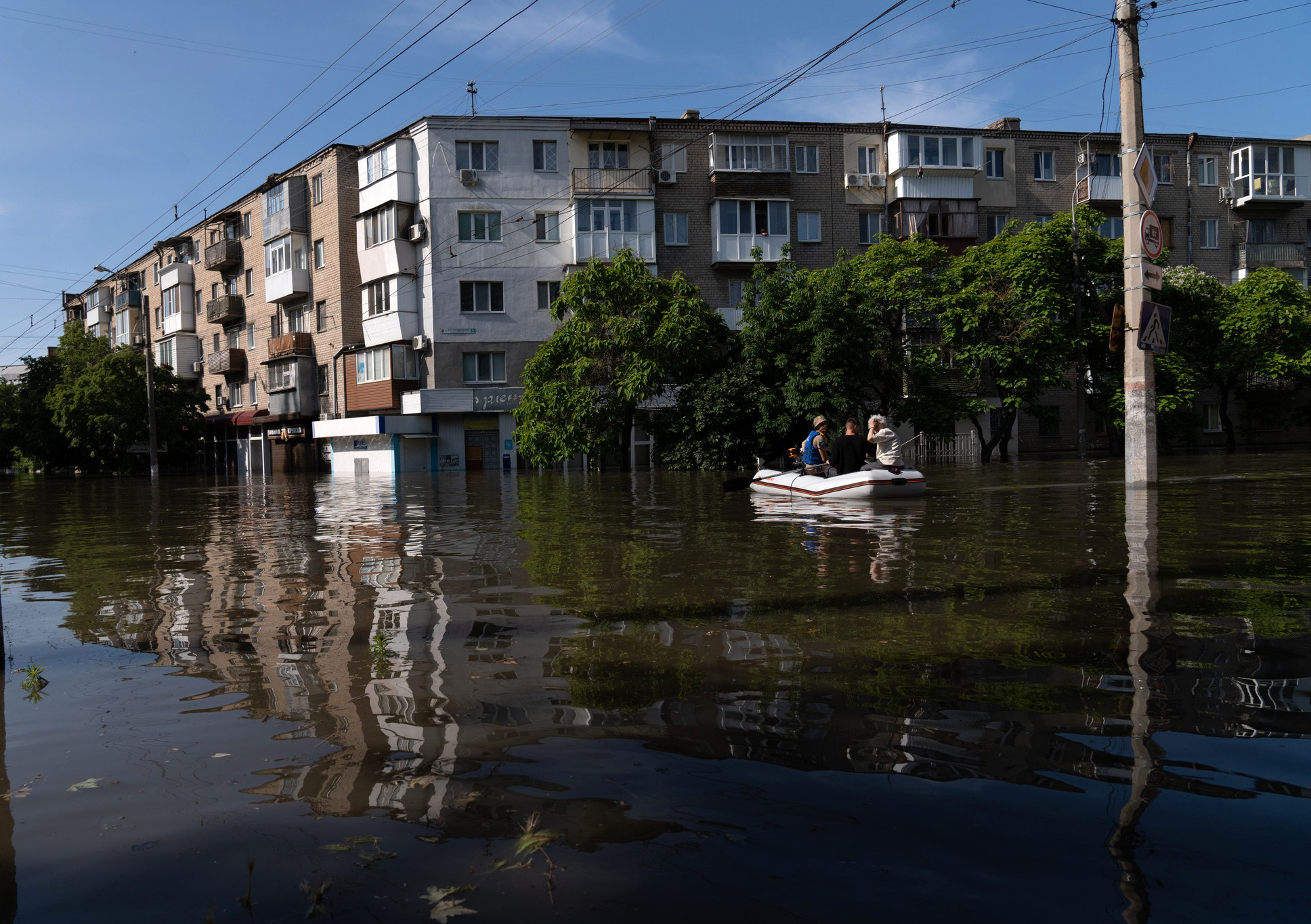
Flooding in Kherson the day after the dam's destruction

On 6 June 2023, an explosion caused significant damage to the central section of the 3.2 kilometres (2.0 mi) wide dam, resulting in uncontrolled water flow downstream. There was an occurrence of an "internal explosion of the structures" within the dam, according to Ukrainian president Volodymyr Zelenskyy. Evacuations and rescue operations commenced as a result.

According to the United Nations, the breach in the Kakhova Dam would have catastrophic consequences. The destruction of the dam led to tens of thousands of people being in a flood zone and more than 50 deaths. Over 40 different towns and villages in Ukraine are severely flooded and massive numbers of livestock have perished.

Russia has controlled the dam since the start of the invasion, but the two sides disagree on the cause of the destruction. Russian-imposed officials in occupied Ukraine claim sabotage by Ukrainian forces. Ukrainian officials attribute the disaster to the 205th Motorized Rifle Brigade of Russia. No other national government has assigned blame for the dam's destruction, but it was reported by the BBC that both the United States and the United Kingdom are leaning towards an assessment of Russian culpability.

The New York Times has written that "the most likely cause of the collapse was an explosive charge placed in the maintenance passageway, or gallery, that runs through the concrete heart of the structure" and that "the evidence clearly suggests the dam was crippled by an explosion set off by the side that controls it: Russia."

EU and Ukrainian leaders condemned the dam's destruction and called it a potential war crime but did not directly accuse Russia. Article 56 of the Geneva Convention forbids attacks on "works and installations containing dangerous forces", including dams. While Russia denies culpability, experts state that a deliberate explosion from inside the Russian-controlled dam is the most probable cause of its destruction.

On 7 June, Ihor Syrota, head of Ukrhydroenergo, said that it would take "at least five years, [and] $1 billion" to rebuild the Kakhovka Dam.

The BBC used satellite imagery to look at the canals fed from the Kakhovka Dam. Four canals have been identified as drying up. This could affect the drinking water of some 700,000 people. It could affect the growing of crops such as corn, soy beans, sunflower, and wheat as well as vegetables and fruits such as melons.

== See also ==
- Hydroelectricity in Ukraine
- FC Enerhiya Nova Kakhovka
- Dnipriany River Port
- Poem of the Sea
