= Canals in Ukraine =

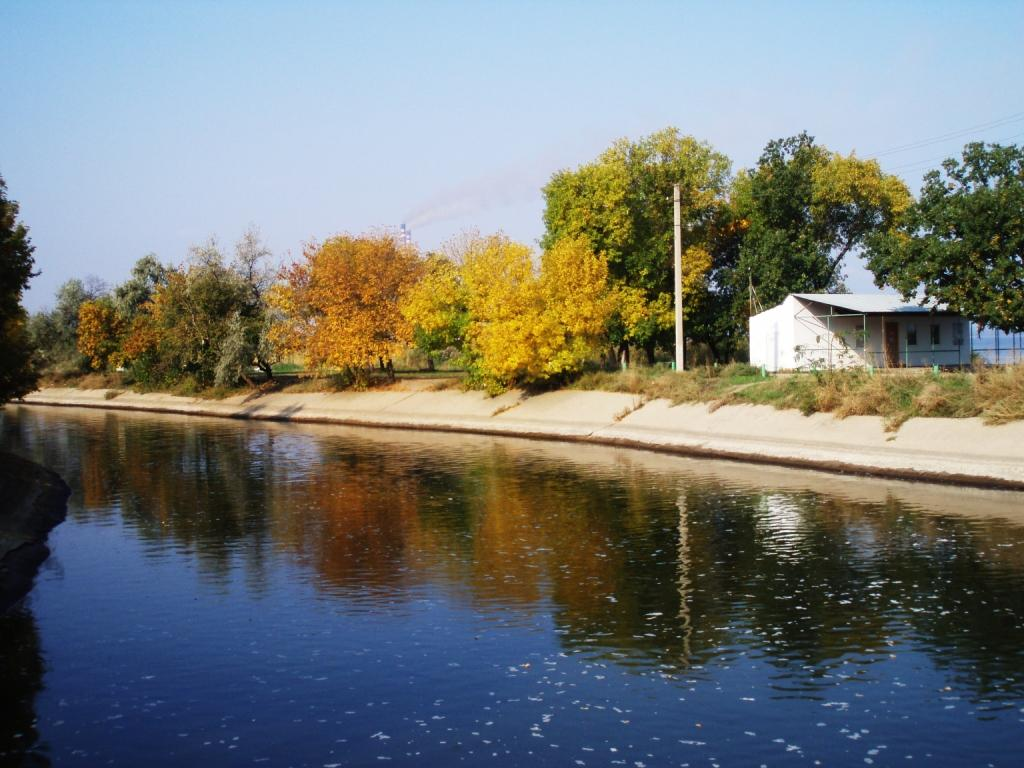
Channel at a storage pool

Canals in Ukraine (Ukrainian: Канали України) are mostly for irrigation or water supply. Most of them are supervised by the Canal Administration of the State Agency of water resources of Ukraine. As the rest of water resources canals compose the Water Fund of Ukraine and are included in the Water Cadastre (register) of Ukraine.

Most of the canals are in the basins of the Dnieper and Siversky Donets, with some in the Danube basin. Their main purpose is water supply, irrigation, and drainage of land; they are also used partially for fish farming and recreation.

== List of Canals ==
=== North Crimean ===
One of the oldest operating canals in Ukraine is the North Crimean Canal, which starts from former Kakhovka Reservoir on the Dnieper near Nova Kakhovka and stretches for 400 km (250 mi) across Northern Crimea and the Kerch Peninsula. Its construction started in 1957 for irrigation of the Kherson Oblast steppe regions and Crimea, as well as water supply to Simferopol, Sevastopol, other populated places, and the Kerch Industrial District. The canal is designed to pass 380 m^{3} (500 cu yd) per second of water. It provides water to the Krasnoznamianka, Chapli, Kolonchak, Krasnoperekopsk, Krasnohvardiyske, Pervomaiske, and other irrigation systems with a total area of over 350,000 ha (1,400 sq mi) in Crimea and Kherson Oblast.

=== Dnipro–Donbas ===
Equally important is the Dnipro – Donbas Canal, which is for water supply of Kharkiv and cities of the Donets basin as well as land irrigation. It starts from the Dniprodzerzhynsk Water Reservoir on the Dnieper then runs through the valleys of the river Orel and Orelka towards the Krasnopavlivske Water Reservoir, then further to the Siversky Donets near the city of Izyum. The first stage of the canal, which is over 260 km (160 mi) long, was built in 1970-1981. Next the canal passes almost to Donetsk city and has a length of 263 km (163 mi).

=== Siverskyi Donets–Donbas ===
The Siverskyi Donets – Donbas Canal, designed to supply 25 m^{3} (33 cu yd) per second of water, was put into service in 1958.

=== Kakhovka ===
The Kakhovka Canal stretches from former Kakhovka Reservoir upstream of Kakhovka across the Pontic steppes almost to the Molochna estuary (liman) and has a length of 130 km (81 mi). The canal was constructed in 1980 for irrigation of agricultural lands. It is also used for water supply to populated places. Its flow rate is up to 520 m^{3} (680 cu yd). Around the lands of Askania Nova for environmental measures was built a vertical drainage around whole contour of the reserve.

=== Dnipro–Kryvyi Rih ===
The Dnipro – Kryvyi Rih Canal stretches from the Kakhovka Reservoir near the village of Marianske (Dnipropetrovsk Oblast) towards the region of Kryvyi Rih and has a total length of over 40 km (25 mi). It is designed for water supply of Kryvbas and irrigation of surrounding farmlands. It was built in 1957-1961 and reconstructed in 1975-1979. The total volume of water supplied by the canal for the purposes of water supply is 929,000,000 m^{3} (753,000 acre⋅ft), for irrigation - 93,000,000 m^{3} (75,000 acre⋅ft) per year.

=== Dnipro–Inhulets ===
The Dnipro – Inhulets Canal (Kirovohrad Oblast) runs from the Kremenchuk Water Reservoir on the Dnieper to the Inhulets River, has a length of 40 km (25 mi), and is used for irrigation and water supply.
