= Great Meadow, Ukraine =

Historical landform in southern Ukraine

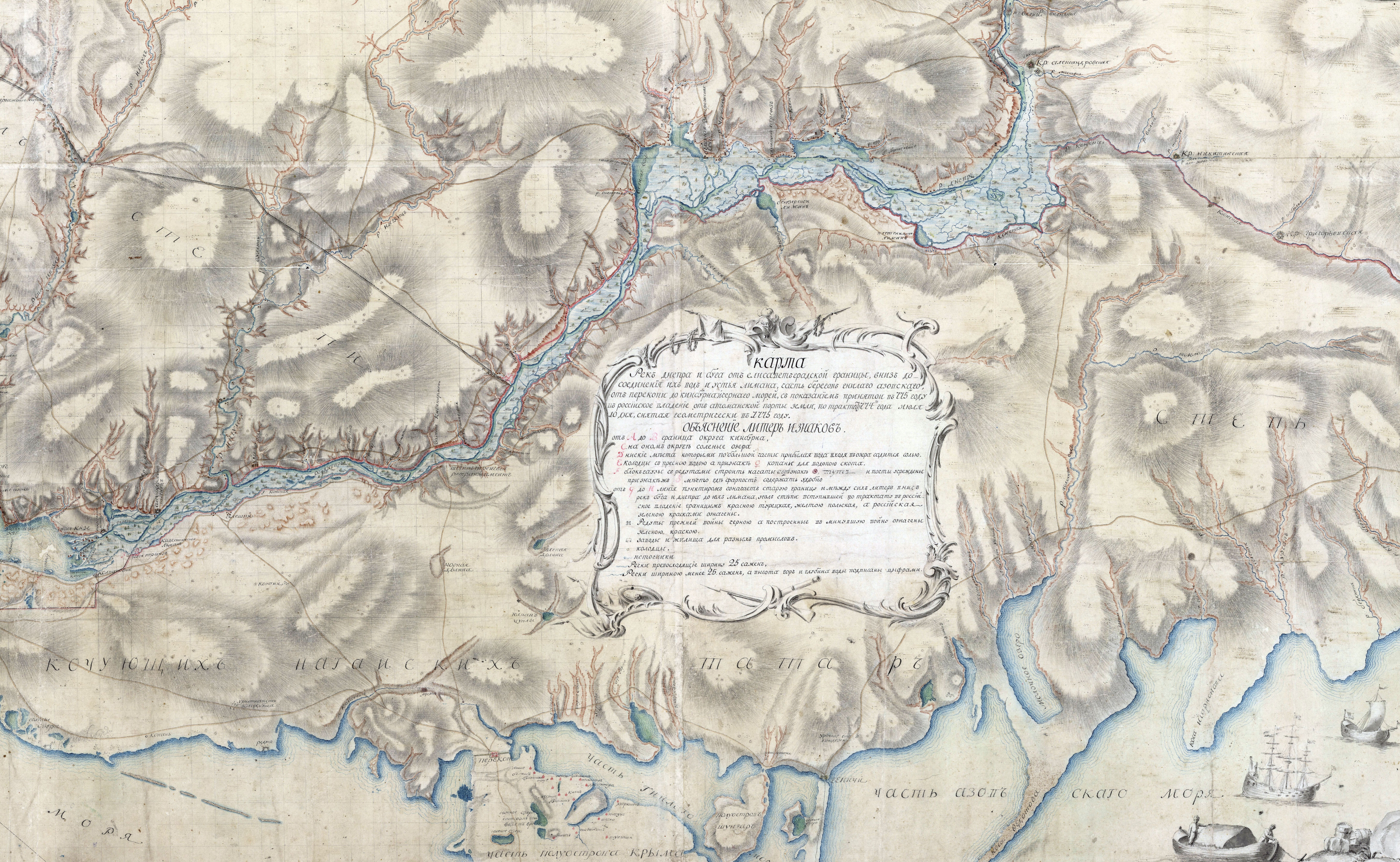
The lands of southern Ukraine, including the Velikiy Lug ('Great Meadow'), as depicted on part of a Russian Empire map of 1775 (Library of the Russian Academy of Sciences)

The Great Meadow (Ukrainian: Великий луг, romanized: Velykyi luh) was an extensive Black Sea lowland area on the Dnipro and the Kinska Rivers to the south of Khortytsia Island that consisted of a system of rivers, reed beds, swamps, flooded forests, and meadows. The Great Meadow landscape embodies the concept of Motherland for Ukrainians. Surrounded by the Pontic–Caspian steppe, it was around 20 kilometres (12 mi) wide and 100 kilometres (62 mi) long.

The area that emcompassed the Great Meadow has been inhabited since the Bronze Age. The Scythians, who flourished during the 4th century BC, were followed by the nomadic tribes of the Sarmatians, Iazyges, Roxolani, and Yamnaya. In 16th–18th centuries, it was inhabited by the Zaporozhian Cossacks, who were protected from external threats by the dense forests and intricate waterways. Six of their eight Sichs were located on its northern border.

The Ukrainian academic Stephen Rudnitsky recognized the Great Meadow ("Veliki Luh") as the hunting grounds for the Zaporozhian Cossacks, and considered its landscape to be "a labyrinth of flat forest and reed-covered alluvial islands, river branches, old river beds, lakes and swamps." Minerals from the Dnieper Lowland flowed through the Great Meadow and accumulated on the shores of the Dnieper-Bug estuary. The Zaporozhian Sich depended on the Great Meadow for sustenance.

After the Zaporizhzhian Sich was destroyed in 1775 by the order of Catherine the Great, the Great Meadow was divided up between her closest nobles, and became fully integrated into the Russian Empire. From that period until the end of the First World War, farmers and landowners extracted as much profit as possible from the area. From the 1920s much of the Great Meadow became collective farmland; only 20% of the area remained as forest by the 1950s. The creation of the Kakhovka Reservoir in 1956 caused irreversible damage to what remained of the original landscape. The reservoir was destroyed in June 2023 during the Russo-Ukrainian War, after which tributaries of the Dnipro, as well as islands and Cossack tracks reappeared. Hydrologists and engineers support the future reconstruction of the reservoir, but ecologists, historians, and archaeologists do not.

The original Great Meadow was the most prominent natural forest in the steppes of Ukraine. It was an important feeding area for migrating birds, and was inhabited by wild pigs, martens, and wolves. The creation of the reservoir in the 1950s led to the local loss or near-extinction of plants, and fundamentally changed the hydrology of the lower Dnipro. Since the destruction of the Kakhovka dam, a vast new ecosystem has reappeared. Similar to the Great Meadow's original landscape of alternating strips of woodland with meadows and swamps, it is a phenomenon that provides an opportunity for the development of forest ecosystems in river valleys to be studied in depth.

== Geography and ecology ==
The Great Meadow as it appears on Schubert's 19th-century maps:

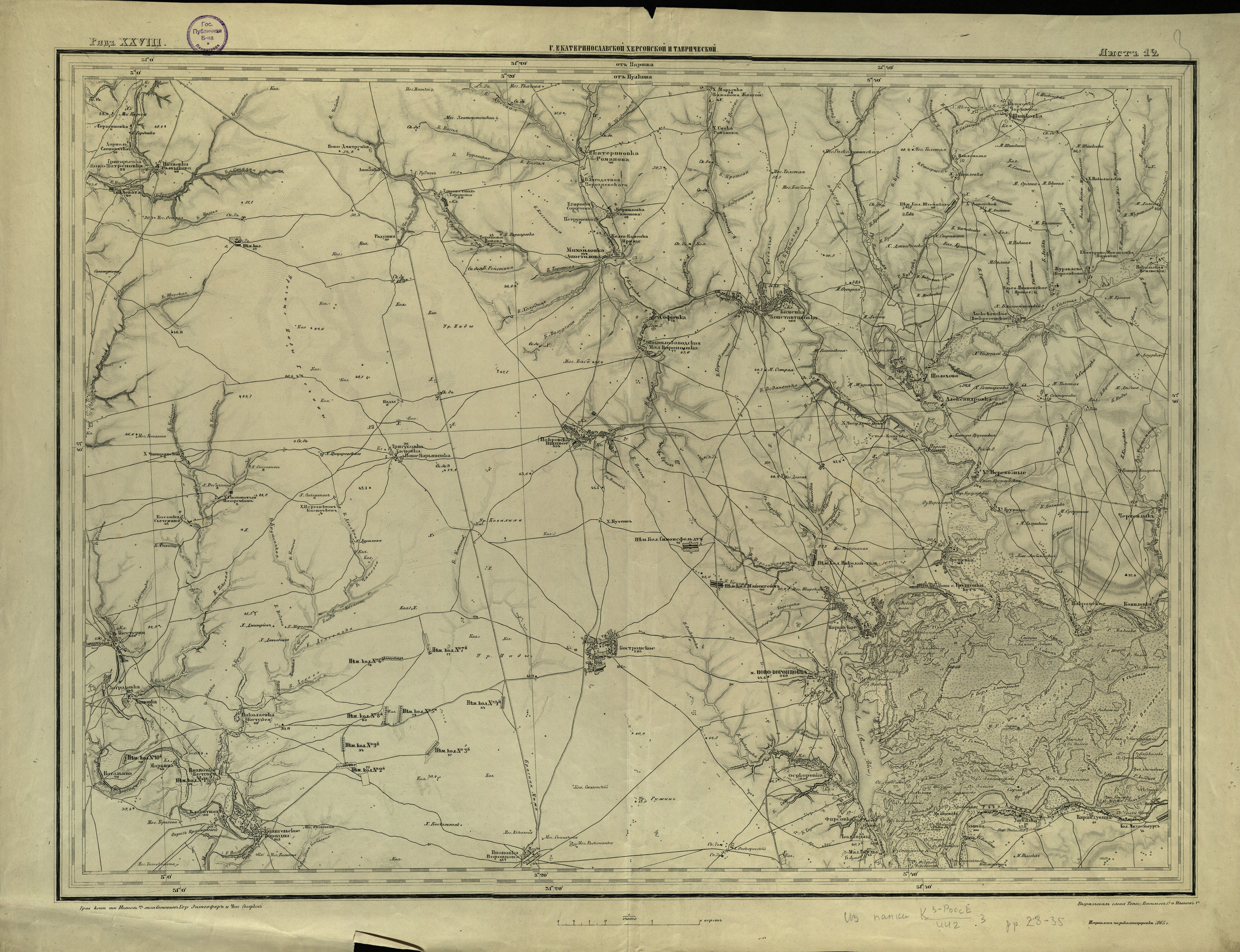

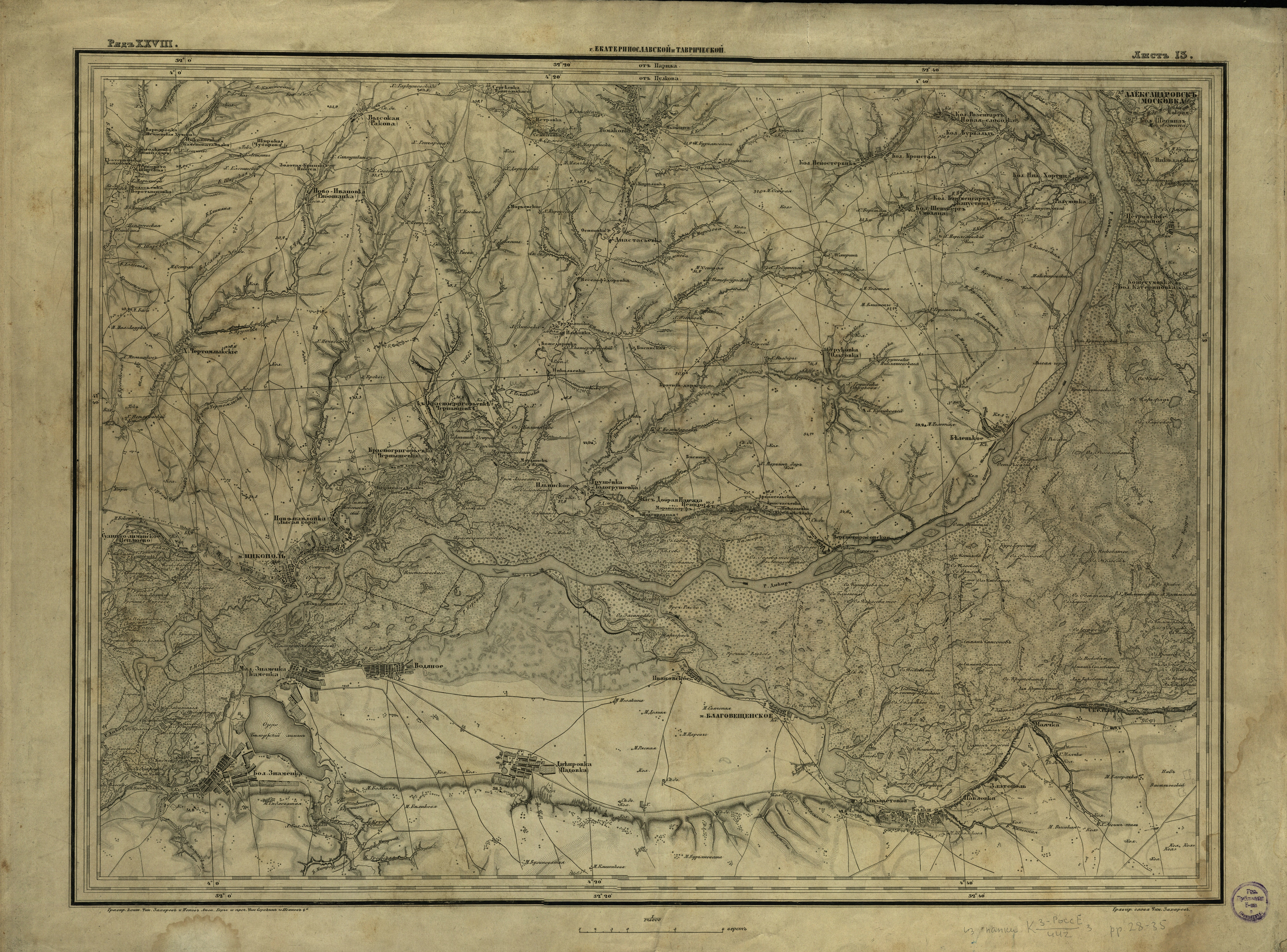

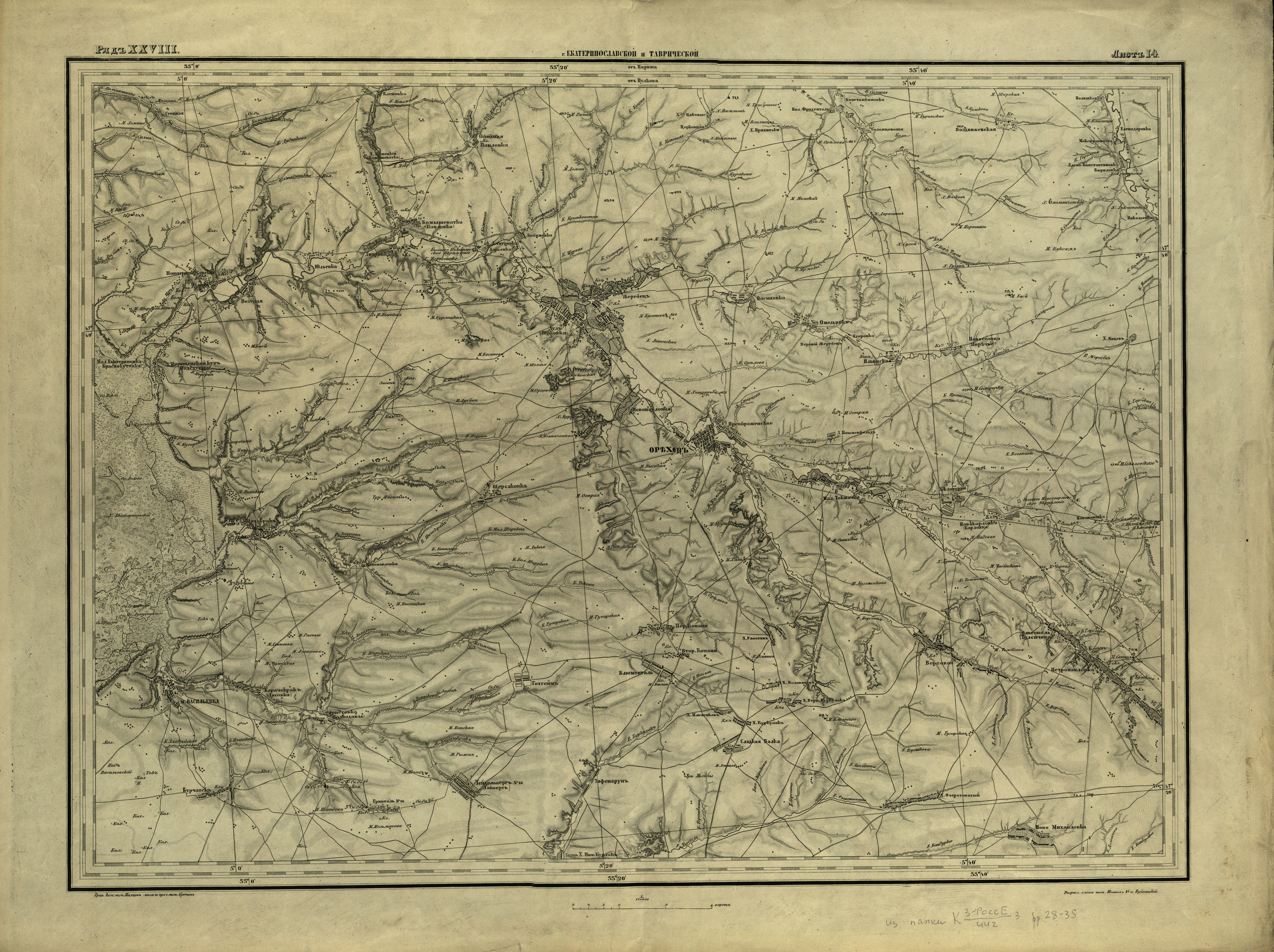

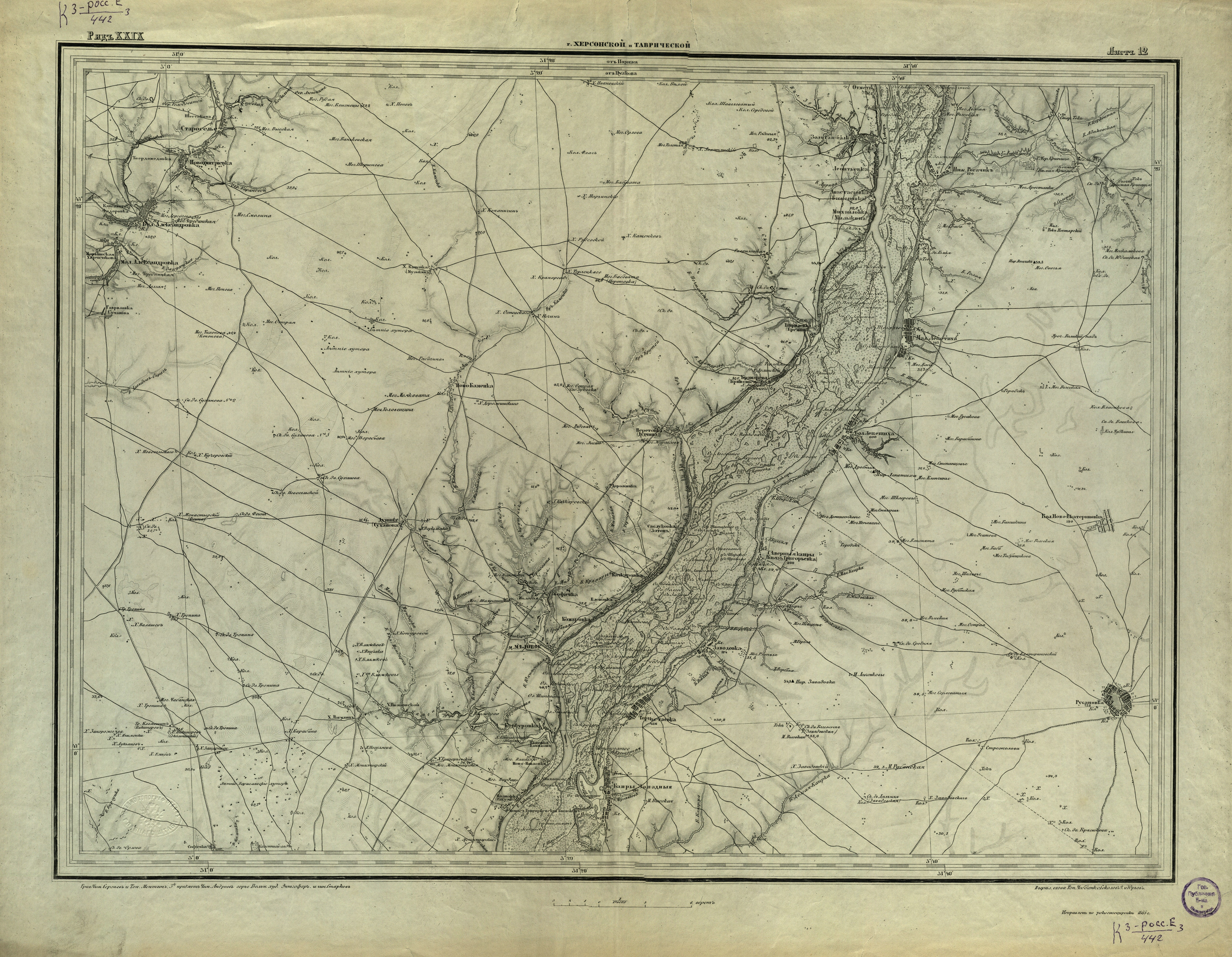

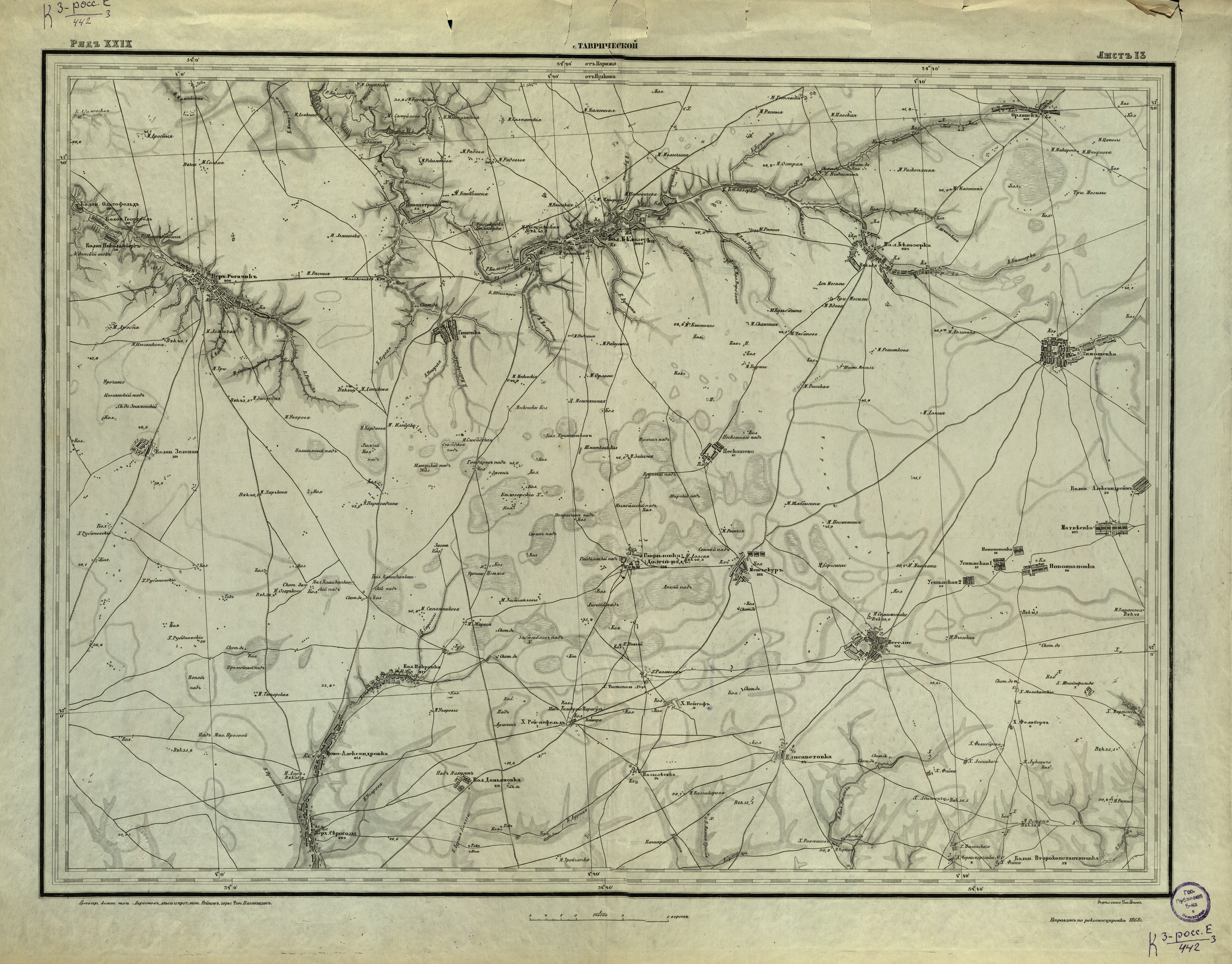

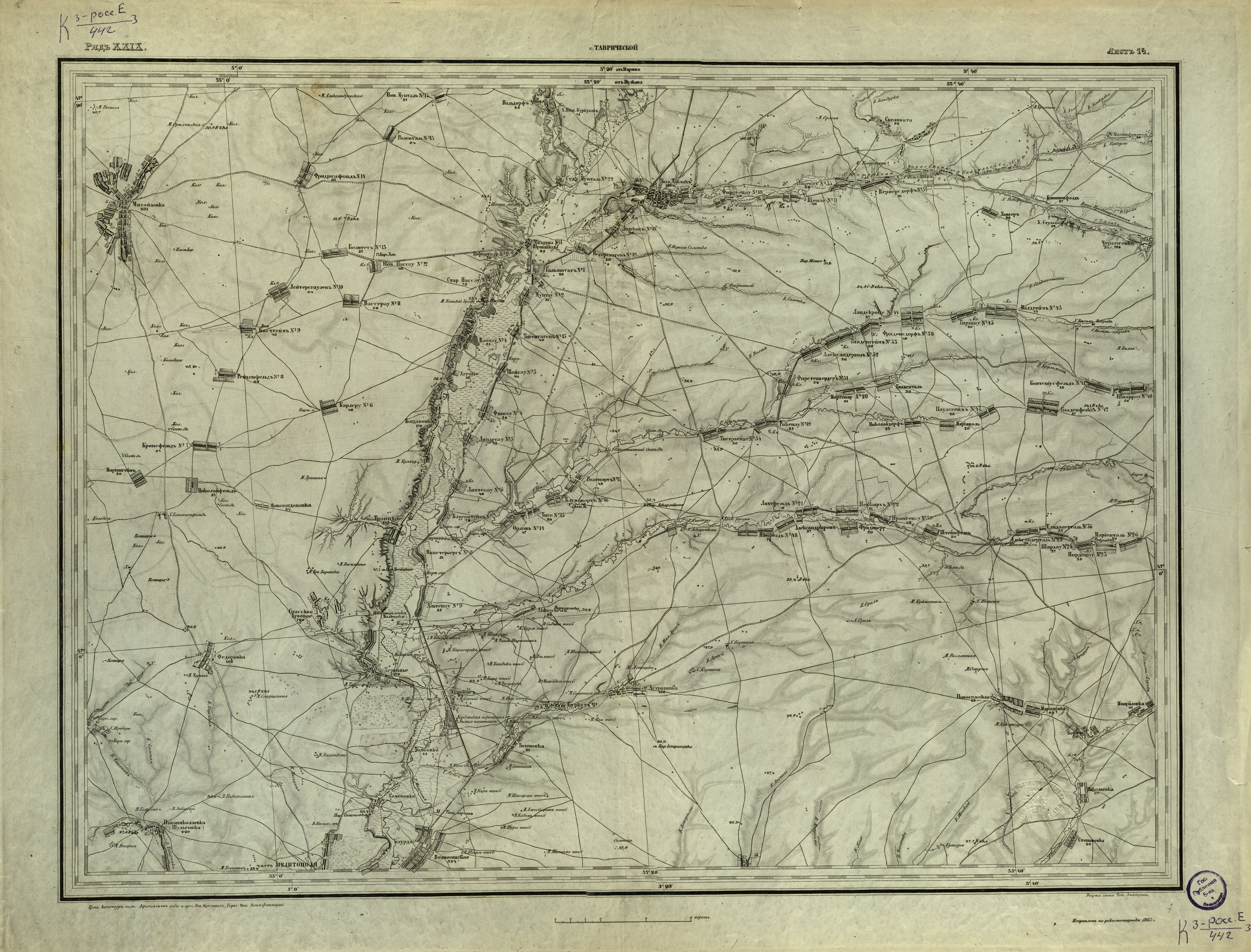

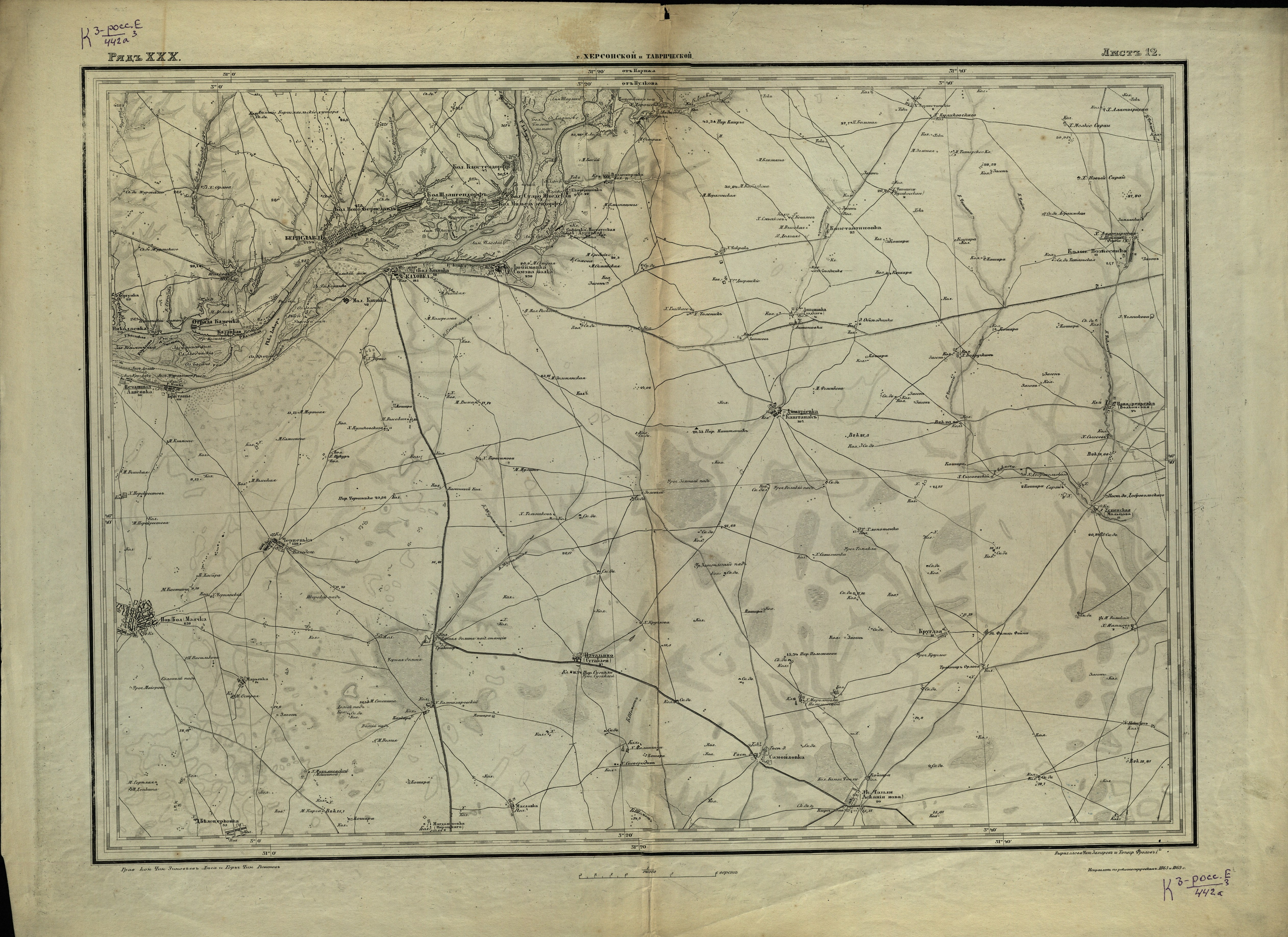

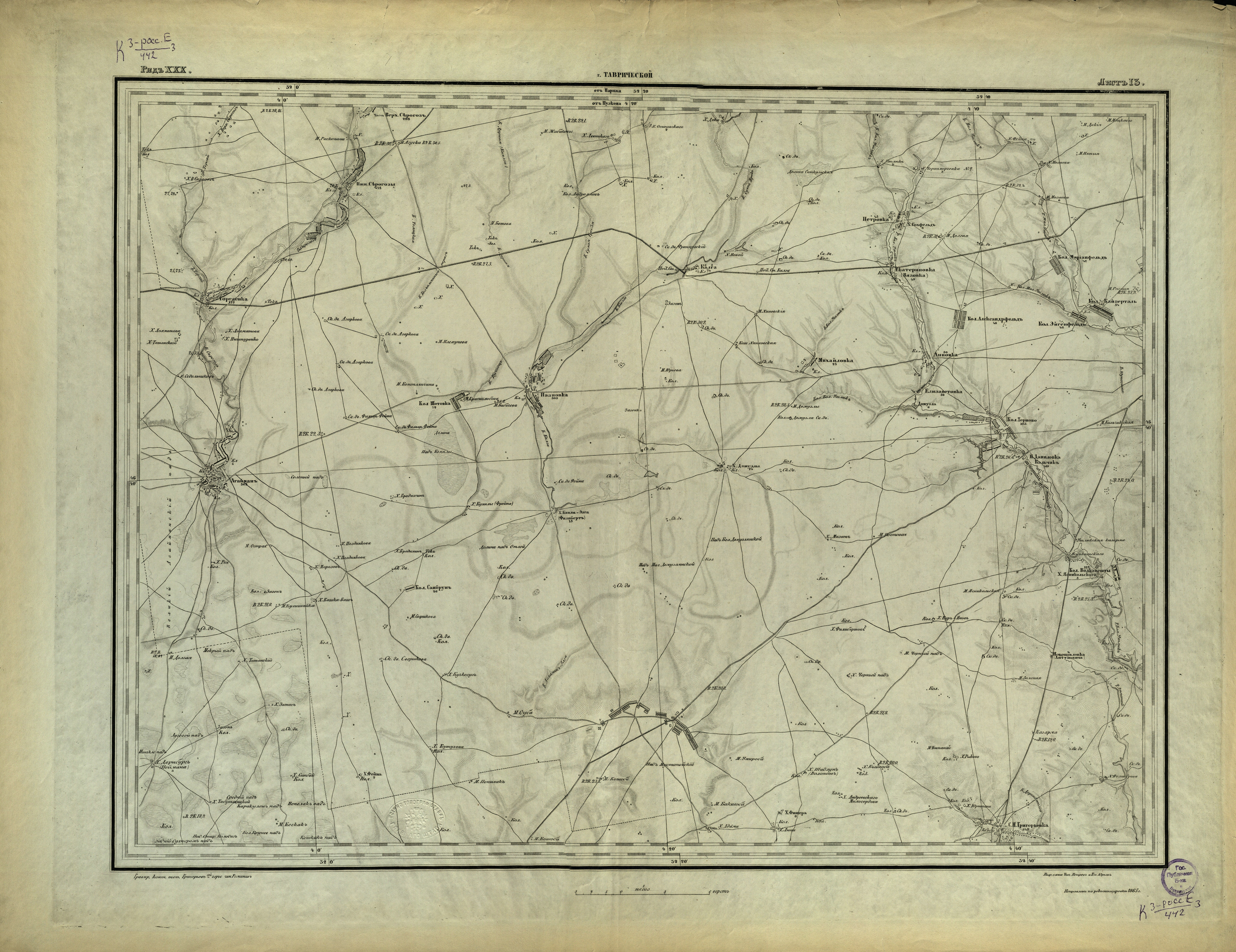

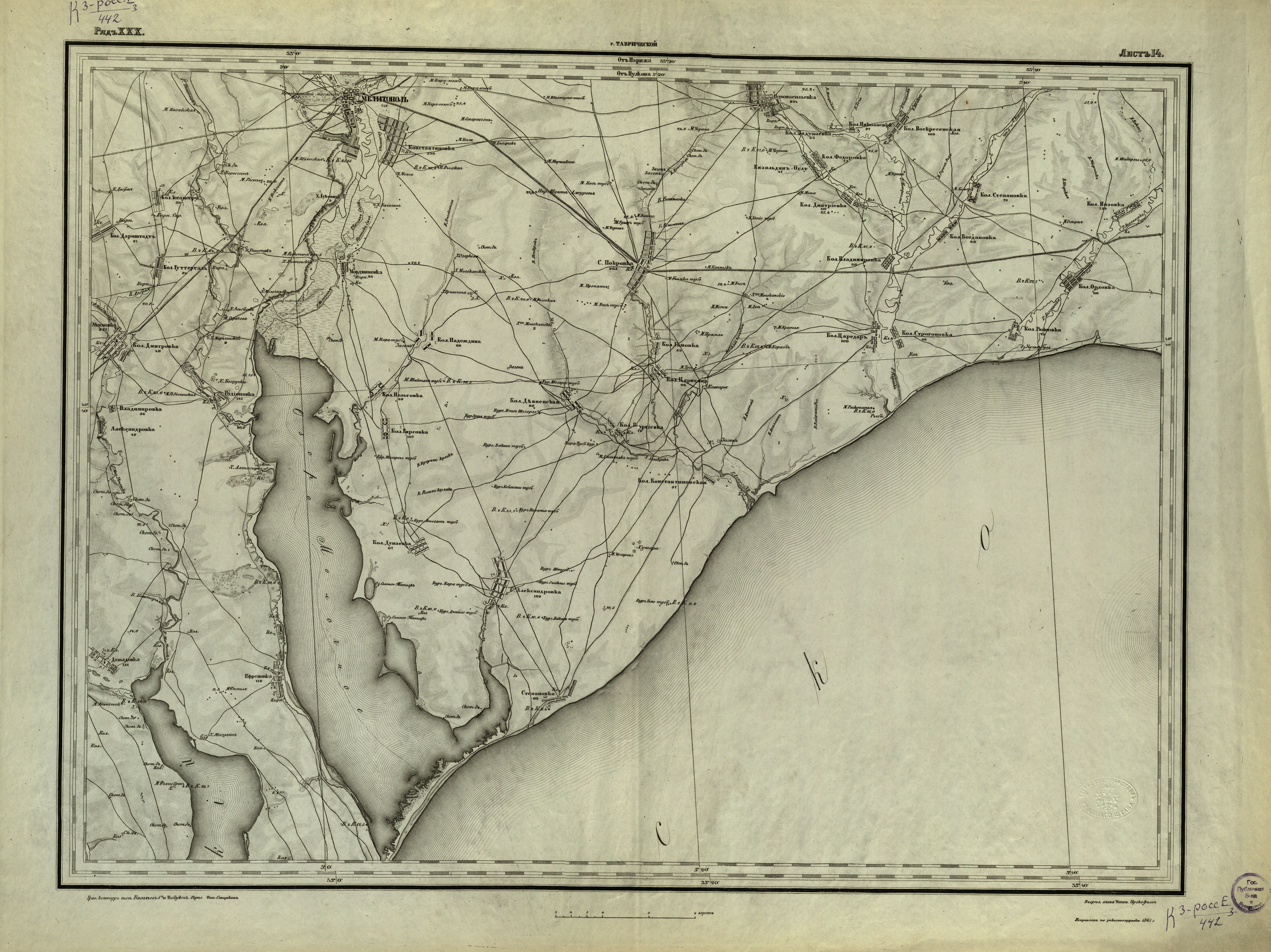

The Great Meadow was located on the Black Sea Lowland and surrounded by the Pontic–Caspian steppe. It was around 20 kilometres (12 mi) wide and 100 kilometres (62 mi) long. It originally consisted of a system of interconnected rivers and tributaries of the Dnipro, reed-covered lakes and swamps, meadows, shrubs, and, in some places, high sandbanks.

The Ukrainian Shield formed the bedrock of the Great Meadow 1.9–2 billion years Before Present (BP). Volodymyr Kubijovyč indicated the Great Meadow formed within depressions in the shield, and on crystalline massif slopes. Both the banks of the Dnipro were forested. The Great Meadow was covered with floodplains and forests containing aspen, alder, willow, and oak. Ancient oak trees grew on those islands that rarely flooded. As the eastern steppes had little or no water, and a lack of shelter for animals, the Great Meadow was abundantly inhabited by hares, foxes, deer, wild pigs, martens, and wolves. Tarpans (free-ranging horses) lived on Tomakivka Island. The Great Meadow was the most prominent natural forest in the steppes of Ukraine, that was an important feeding area for migrating birds. The trees provided shelter for birds, who were preyed upon by falcons, kites, and eagles.

The Greek historian Herodotus wrote of the Dnipro in the 5th century BC:

Borysphen is by far the biggest and the richest river in nutrients. It stands above not only Scythian rivers, but all other rivers as well, with the exception of the Nile in Egypt... And it is by far the most beautiful river. It provides lush pastures for cattle, excellent and plentiful fish. The water is clean and it tastes well... It is framed by excellent farmland and tall wild grass grows in non-cultivated areas... Borysphen is home to gigantic fish with no backbone (sturgeon)... and many other things.

In the 5th–4th centuries BC, the area experienced regular droughts. Rivers levels reduced, and the tributaries of the Dnipro became very shallow. A thousand years later, frequent precipitation acted to raise river levels again, and peat bogs and humus were created.

== Etymology ==
The Russian word lug is equivalent to the Ukrainian luka (feminine, plural – luky), or obolon'. The word describes an area of grassland along a river that is periodically flooded. A separate word—luh—was used in Ukrainian, distinct from the concept of luka, to describe a regularly-flooded forest. The term Velykyi luh came to mean an ancient floodplain forest that surrounded a Cossack stronghold (sich). (Note: Meadows prevailed in the area before the 1950s, but it is trees that are returning now that the waters have disappeared. The Great Meadow is sometimes inaccurately used to denote the area previously covered by the Kakhovka Reservoir, or that part of it that is currently turning into a young forest.)

== History ==
The Great Meadow has been inhabited since ancient times, with archaeological finds dating back to the Bronze Age, the Scythian period, and the Kievan Rus'. It is a landscape that embodies the concept of Motherland for Ukrainians. The landscape is particularly notable due to its historical association with the Cossacks. The Ukrainian scientist Valentin Krysachenko has written that the steppes, the Wild Fields, and the Great Meadow—"lowlands covered with grassy and woody vegetation, intersected by rivers flowing in different directions, bays, estuaries, channels, numerous major and minor lakes, overgrown with tall impassable reeds."—all featured predominately in the lives of the Zaporizhian Cossacks, observing that the wetlands provided them with both game, timber, and fodder for their animals.

=== Early settlers ===
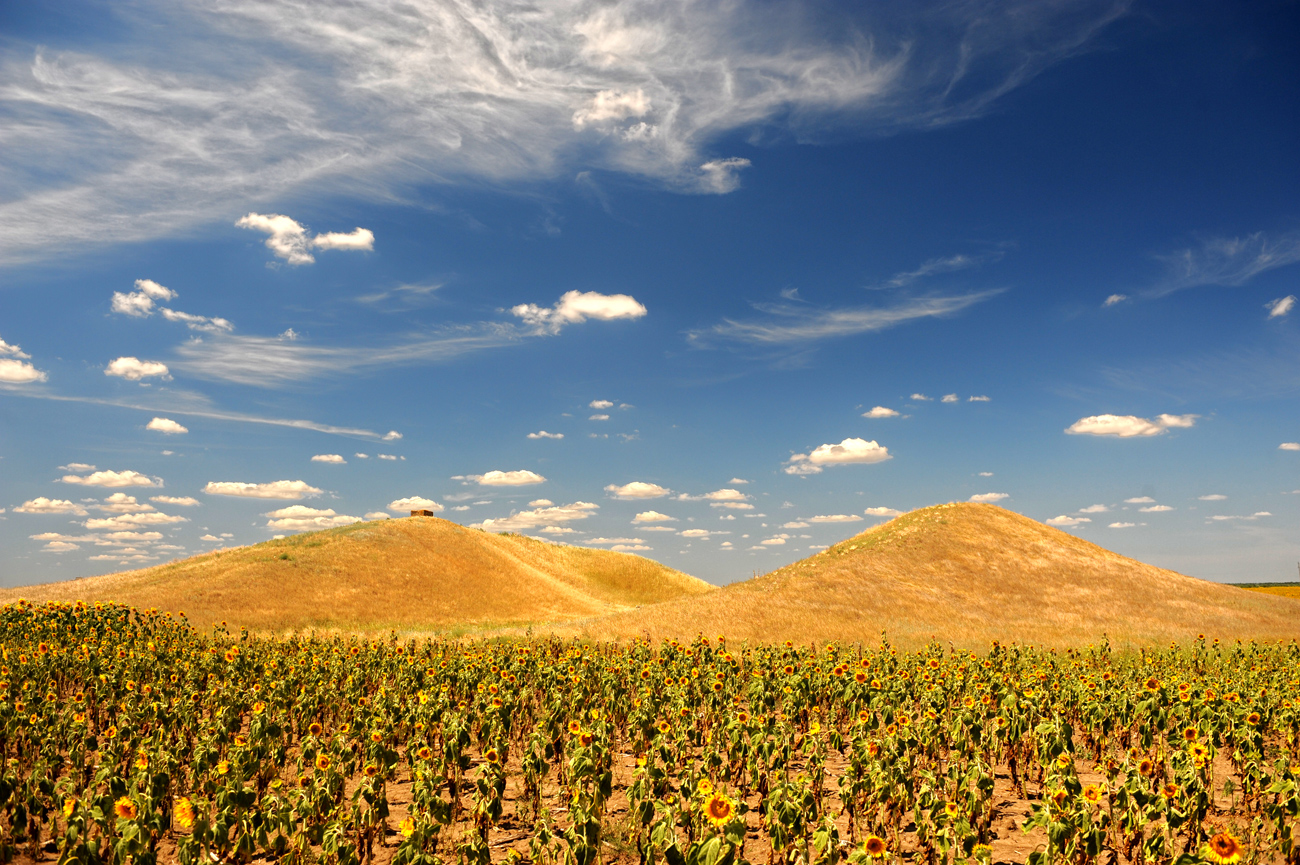
The Scythian Kozel kurgan, which dates from the 1st century BC

The peoples of the Yamnaya and Kemi Oba cultures occupied the region around the Great Meadow from about 3700 BC to 2200BC. The metropolis of Scythia, which flourished during the 6th to 4th centuries BC, was located in what is now modern Kamianka-Dniprovska. (Note: In 1900, farms, houses, foundries, and craft workshops associated with the metropolis were discovered. Bricks and coins indicated the presence of the Golden Horde in the area during this period.) The Scythians controlled the Dnipro trade route, and taxed the goods that passed through lands they controlled. According to Herodotus, they flourished during the 4th century BC. The kurgans (tumuli) of Scythian rulers such as at Chortomlyk, Ohuz, and Kozel in Dnipro's lowlands are dated from this period. In the 3rd to 1st century BC, the nomadic Sarmatians, Iazyges, and Roxolani ousted the Scythians.

The 14th-century Kuchuhurske settlement, the largest known settlement of the Golden Horde on the Dnipro, and generally identified as Mamai-Sarai, was located in the Great Meadow. In 1374, after a drought led to famine throughout the region, Mamai's forces left the Great Meadow and resettled in Crimea.

=== Zaporozhian Cossacks ===
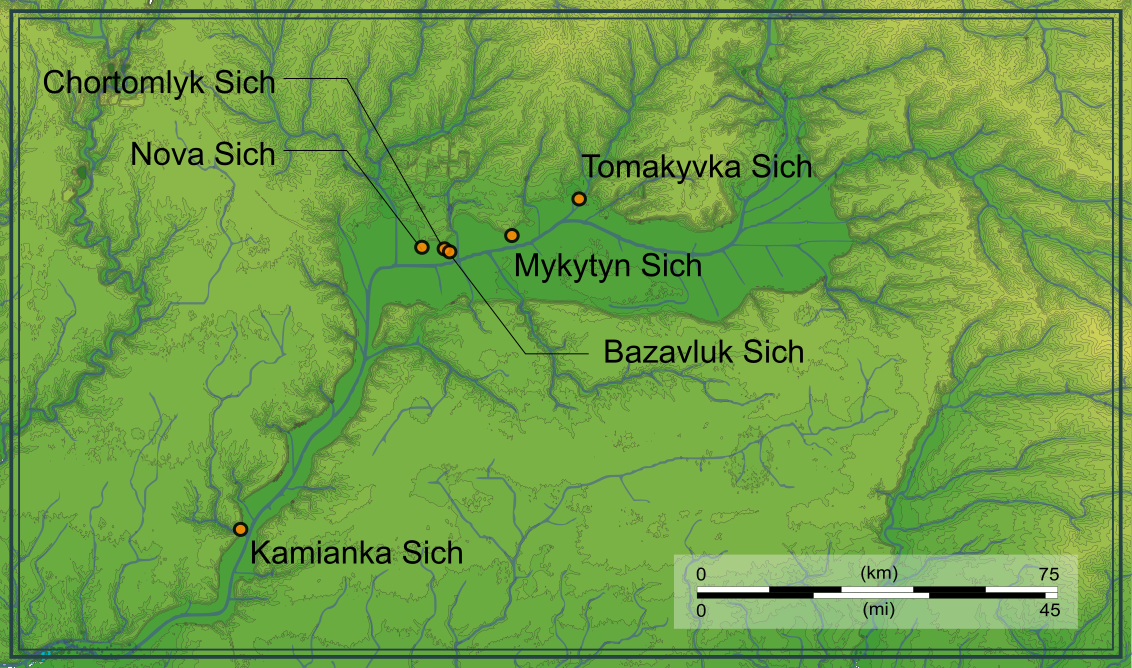
Map of the Great Meadow Sichs

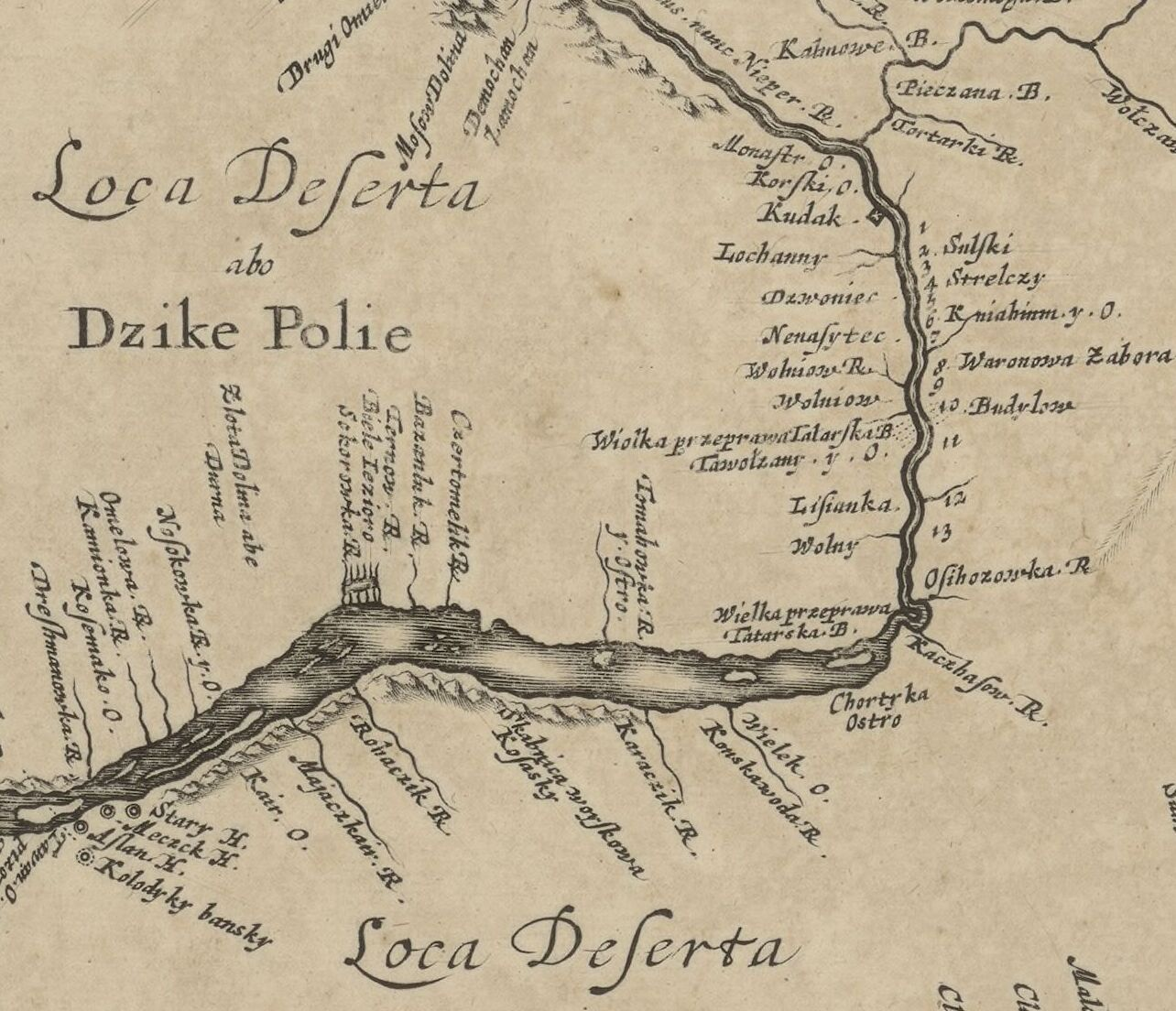
The Great Meadow with the Zaporizhian Siches according to Beauplan's 1648 Typus generalis Ukrainae.

In 16th–18th centuries, the Great Meadow was one of the most important areas of the Zaporozhian Sich. It is nowadays considered to be "an inclusive part of the formation of the modern Ukrainian ethnos". The historian Serhii Plokhy has written that it was Cossack lands that provided modern Ukraine with its language and its name.

In contrast to the surrounding dry steppe, the Great Meadow was permanently inhabited by the Zaporozhian Cossacks, who called it Bat'ko ('Father'). (Note: According to a Cossacks song: "Oh Sich - mother oh Sich - mother! / And the Great Meadow is the father! / Oh, what can you earn in the meadow, / Then drink it in the Sich.") The southern part of the Great Meadow was called Bazavluh by the Cossacks, probably because of the Bazavluk River. According to Guillaume Le Vasseur de Beauplan, the French-Polish cartographer who produced the 1648 General Map of Ukraine, the Zaporozhian Cossacks recruited from peasants escaping their overlords:

…if it happens that these poor peasants fall safely into the hands of wicked lords, they are in a more deplorable state than galley slaves. It is this slavery that causes many to escape, and the bravest among them to flee to Zaporizhzhia, which is the place of retreat for the Cossacks in Borysthenes. After spending some time there and making a voyage at sea, they are known as Zaporizhzhia Cossacks…. …in peacetime, hunting and fishing were the most common occupations of these Cossacks.

— Le Vasseur de Beauplan, Description d'Ukranie (1660), p.9

The Great Meadow provided more favourable conditions for settlers than the steppe, and by 1774, over 100,000 Cossacks lived in the Great Meadow. The area was used for agriculture, raising livestock, and as a source of wood, and the dense forest served to protect the Cossacks from external threats. Honey was abundant, and a lot of honey and beeswax was exported.

The Cossacks were the first Europeans to plant forests, which they planted as a means of defence. Their territory was a militarily sensitive zone that bordered the Crimean Khanate—from the 1650s until up to the beginning of the reign of Peter the Great (1682), their light cavalry supported the Russian army. Remaining in their own lands, they were better suited to fight the Tatars, who campaigned on horseback, and so shunned the rivers, lakes and swamps of the Great Meadow, to avoid becoming lost. Beauplan described how the Zaporozhian Cossacks were able to use an alternative river route to enter the Sea of Azov when the Dnipro estuary was blocked by the Ottomans. A long track along the entire length of the Great Meadow was probably only used when the rivers were ice-covered—in summer, deep rivers were a much more convenient as a means of transport.

Six of the eight Sichs were located on the banks of the Dnipro, which former the northern border of the Great Meadow: (Note: The two sichs not listed are the Khortytsia Castle (c. 1550s; status as "the first sich" is disputed) and the Oleshky Sich (1711–1728).)

- Tomakivka Sich, established during the late 16th century.
- Bazavluk Sich (1593–1638), a large base situated on Bazavluk Island. It was destroyed by troops led by the Polish Hetman Mikołaj Potocki.
- Mykytyn Sich, where the 17th-century commander Bohdan Khmelnytsky led the Cossacks to attack the Poles.

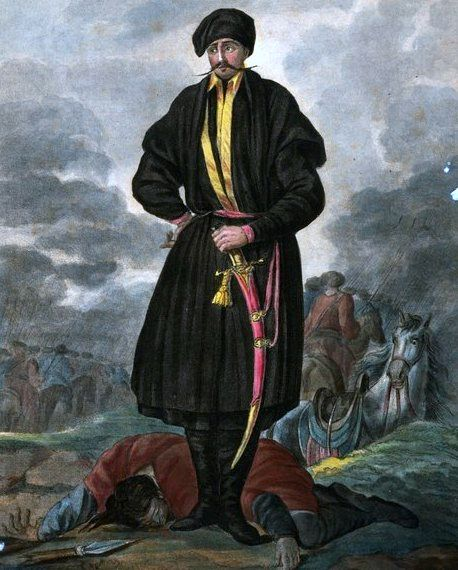
A coloured engraving by Emelyan Korneev of an 18th-century Zaporozhian Cossack officer

- Chortomlyk Sich (1652–1709), became prominent during the time of Ivan Sirko, who resided here from 1663. Peter the Great ordered that the sich be destroyed, following the Cossacks' alignment with Ivan Mazepa. In 1654 they recognized Alexis of Russia as their military protector and their hetman pledged his full allegiance to the tsar, in exchange for recognition of certain rights.
- Kamianka Sich (1709–1711 and 1728–1734), the only Sich whose features, including the council square, the treasury, workshops, houses, shops, and a tavern, have surviving remains. After the Chortomlyk Sich was destroyed, the Cossacks fled to the River Kamianka, where the khan Devlet II Giray allowed them to build the Kamianka Sich. The Cossacks became a client society of the Crimean Khanate, but their loyalty towards Russian Orthodoxy repelled them from serving as vassals of the Khanate. The Oleshky Sich (1711–1728) was built outside the Great Meadow by Cossacks fleeing from the Kamianka Sich, razed by Muscovite troops in May 1711. Oleshky was within the territory of the Crimean Khanate, and Devlet II Giray initially welcomed them and treated them mildly. However, his successor imposed more burdens and restrictions on the Cossacks. Eventually, pro-Muscovite Samara Cossacks plundered and razed the Oleshky Sich in May 1728. The Chortomlyk Sich was briefly resettled until spring 1730, when Cossacks moved back to the Kamianka Sich.
- Nova Sich (1734–1775), built with the permission from the prominent Cossack Ivan Malashevych. At one time it was fortified with an 3.5 to 4 metres (11 to 13 ft) tall earth rampart. In 1733 the khan ordered the Cossacks into Poland to support the newly-elected Polish king Stanisław I Leszczyński, but they instead reached an agreement with the Russians, and built a new base at Nova Sich. At this time their territory stretched on both sides of the Dnipro, bordered by the rivers Southern Bug, Kalmius, and Konka. It was divided into five palankas, with military administrators being elected by the representatives of about 15,000 men. The Russians avoided interfering within Cossack lands, preferring to monitor the Cossacks from fortified outposts. They treated them as reserves in the event of another Ottoman war, and a frontline defence against Tatar raids. After 1775, when Peter Tekeli destroyed the Zaporizhzhia Sich by the order of Catherine the Great, the Great Meadow slowly became integrated into the Russian Empire.

=== 19th century and early 20th century ===
After the abolition of the Zaporozhian Sich, the area was divided between the nobles closest to the Russian court, and German farmers were brought in to work on the land. The historian Adrian Kashchenko, writing in 1917, noted that:

The upper part of the Great Meadow, together with the lands on both its banks, was granted to Prince Potemkin, the initiator of the abolition of the Zaporozhian Army. From him, this land, together with the Cossacks who lived on it, was inherited passed by his niece, Countess Skavronska, who sold the last part of those lands, namely 12,223 desiatinas along the Serednia and Nyzhnia Khortytsia rivers, to Myklashevsky. Having bought them for a few kopecks per desiatina, the latter sold that land in 1802 to the Germans for 72 kopecks per desiatinain silver. Myklashevsky did the same with the land he bought from the last hetman of Ukraine, Rozumovsky, and Field Marshal Kamensky below the Khortytsia (the villages of Rozumivka and Bilenke). He bought 60,000 desiatinas for 7 kopecks, and sold it to the Germans for 57 kopecks per desiatina.

The easiest way to explore the Great Meadow during this period was by boat, using a good map or a guide, and even then any fast currents had to be avoided. Throughout the 19th century and into the 20th century, the area became degraded as farmers and landowners extracted as much profit as possible. The high cost of fuel during the Great War greatly contributed to its gradual destruction.

=== 1920s– 2010s ===
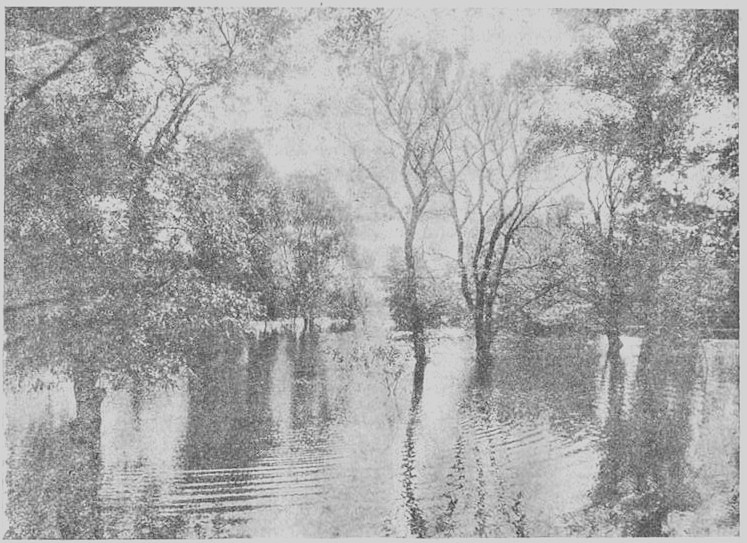
A photograph of Tomakivka Island from Adrian Kashchenko's The Great Meadow of Zaporozhia (1917)

For centuries, the Great Meadow had been used for raising horses, logging, hunting, fishing, and beekeeping, and to provide wool, milk and meat. After the Ukrainian People's Republic was incorporated into the USSR in 1922, the area was steadily converted into collective farms, until only 20% of the area remained as forest. In the mid-1920s, Ukrainian Soviets scientists proposed the creation nature reserve within the Great Meadow. During the Holodomor (1932–1933), inhabitants of the area were saved from starvation by foraging for roots and water nuts.

Prior to its destruction in the 1950s, only 20% of the Great Meadow was forested, which led to the modern perception of the area as mainly consisting of meadows. The Dnipro basin ecosystems are now largely incapable of self-restoration, as industrial plants, farms, and cities have over the decades discharged vast quantities of waste into the Dnipro and its tributaries. The creation of the Dnipro cascade reservoirs caused permanent changes that transformed the Dnipro from a river ecosystem to a predominantly lake ecosystem, causing a slowing down of water exchange in the water cycle, and an increase in water loss.

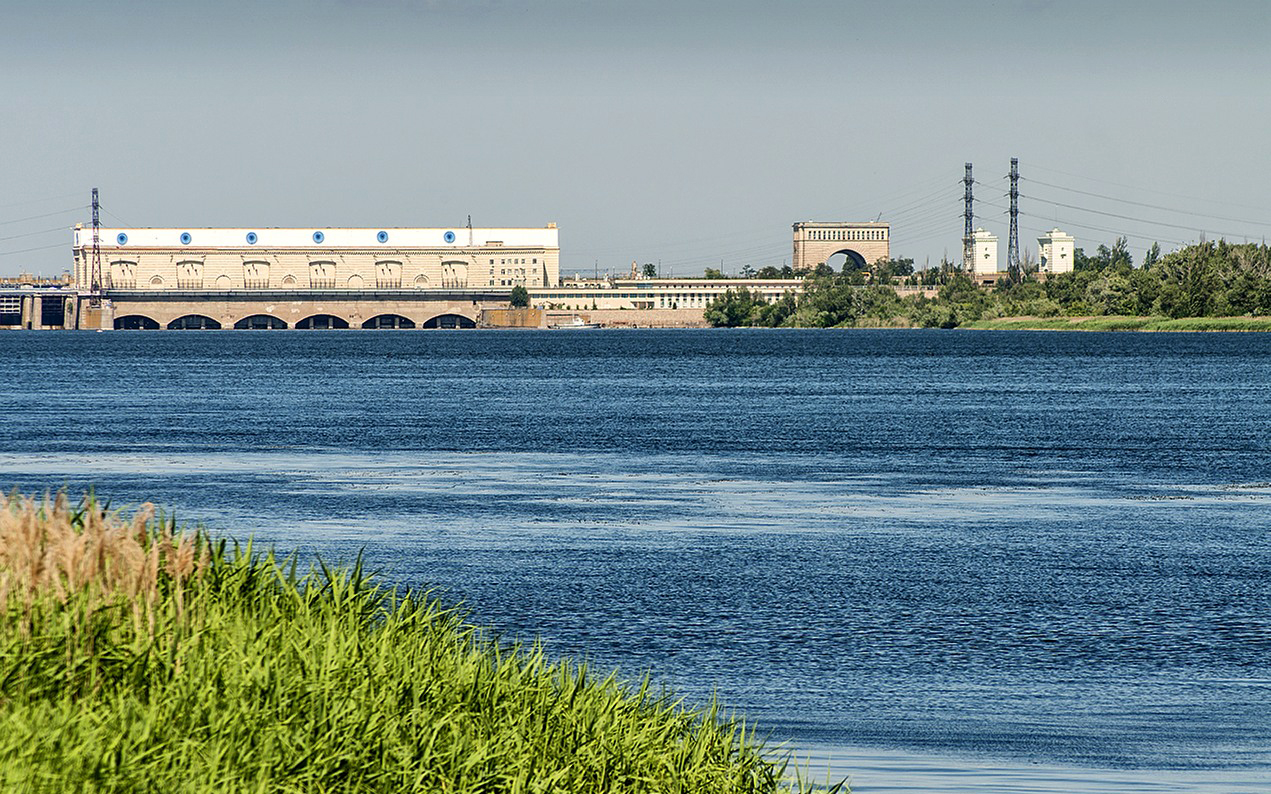
The Kakhovka Dam and Kakhovka Hydroelectric Station in 2012

In 1956, the Kakhovka Dam was completed, and the Kakhovka Reservoir—the largest in Ukraine at that time—was created. Approximately 230 kilometres (140 mi) long and 25 kilometres (16 mi) wide with a volume of 18.2 cubic kilometres (4.4 cu mi), and a total area of 2,155 square kilometres (832 sq mi), its creation caused irreversible damage to the Great Meadow, which covered almost the entire area, and the destruction of over 90 villages. Around 37,000 residents were forced to resettle. In return, the reservoir provided irrigation to vast areas of southern Ukraine, and the dam generated 1489 million kWh of electricity per year. A new town—Nova Kakhovka was created. Infrastructure built at the site of the 193-metre long (211 yd) concrete dam included an earth dam, a spillway, and a lock for shipping. Additionally, the reservoir supplied over 21 cubic kilometres (5.0 cu mi) of water per year to the Kakhovka Canal, the North Crimean Canal, and the Dnipro-Kryvyi Rih Canal, so irrigating 750,000 hectares (1,900,000 acres) of farmland. Over the years, the banks of the reservoir damaged the surrounding farmland, and increased the risk of flooding. Water taken from the reservoir caused groundwater levels to rise and fertile land to become unproductive as a result of salinisation.

The Great Meadow had previously played an important part in maintaining the biodiversity of the southern Ukrainian lands. The creation of the reservoir led to the local loss or near-extinction of plant species such as the Scythian tulip (Tulipa scythica), the Scythian sage (Phlomis scythica), Regel's onion (Allium regelianum), the narrow-leaved peony (Paeonia tenuifolia), and the small fritillary (Fritillaria meleagroides). By the 1960s, after the dam was built, the area around the former Great Meadow fostered trees and shrubs such as oak, elm and willow, and swamp plants such as Phragmites, Typha latifolia, and Acorus calamus.

In 2006, the Grand Meadow National Nature Park was created from small islands and coastal areas of eastern Kakhovka Reservoir in Zaporizhzhia Oblast, and similarly the Kamianka Sich National Nature Park was formed in 2019 in right-bank Kherson Oblast.

=== Russo-Ukrainian war ===
In June 2023, the Kakhovka Dam was destroyed, and the reservoir began to drain away. As the waters were leaving the reservoir, tributaries of the Dnipro River, islands, and Cossack tracks reappeared. Archaeological looting became widespread soon after the reservoir was emptied, and the draining of the reservoir led to the fish population dying out, totalling an estimated 11,400 tons of dead fish. Tree stumps from trees that grew before the dam was built are now visible, and rust areas along the edge of the current bank may be evidence that iron particles are emerging from groundwater. The hydrology of the lower Dnipro has changed fundamentally; water level fluctuations are now almost entirely dependent upon discharges from the Dnipro Hydroelectric Station, located upstream.

Shortly after the dam was breached, biologists from Kherson State University's Ukrainian Nature Conservation Group and the M. G. Kholodny Institute of Botany of the National Academy of Sciences began a long-term study of the ecological development of the drained area. On 12 March 2024, the Ukrainian Cabinet of Ministers banned the transfer of ownership or use of land that emerged from the former reservoir due to plans of restoring the dam.

According to the Ukrainian historian Oleksandr Alfiorov, "…we still cannot assess the consequences of over 70 years of water domination in it. Now, we can see this relief, it is obvious that we will also see burial mounds, but we cannot yet assess, for example, the degree of damage and siltation of the territory. There is no doubt that most of the archaeological monuments were destroyed when the Kakhovka Reservoir was created."

== Regeneration following the breaching of the Kakhovka Dam ==
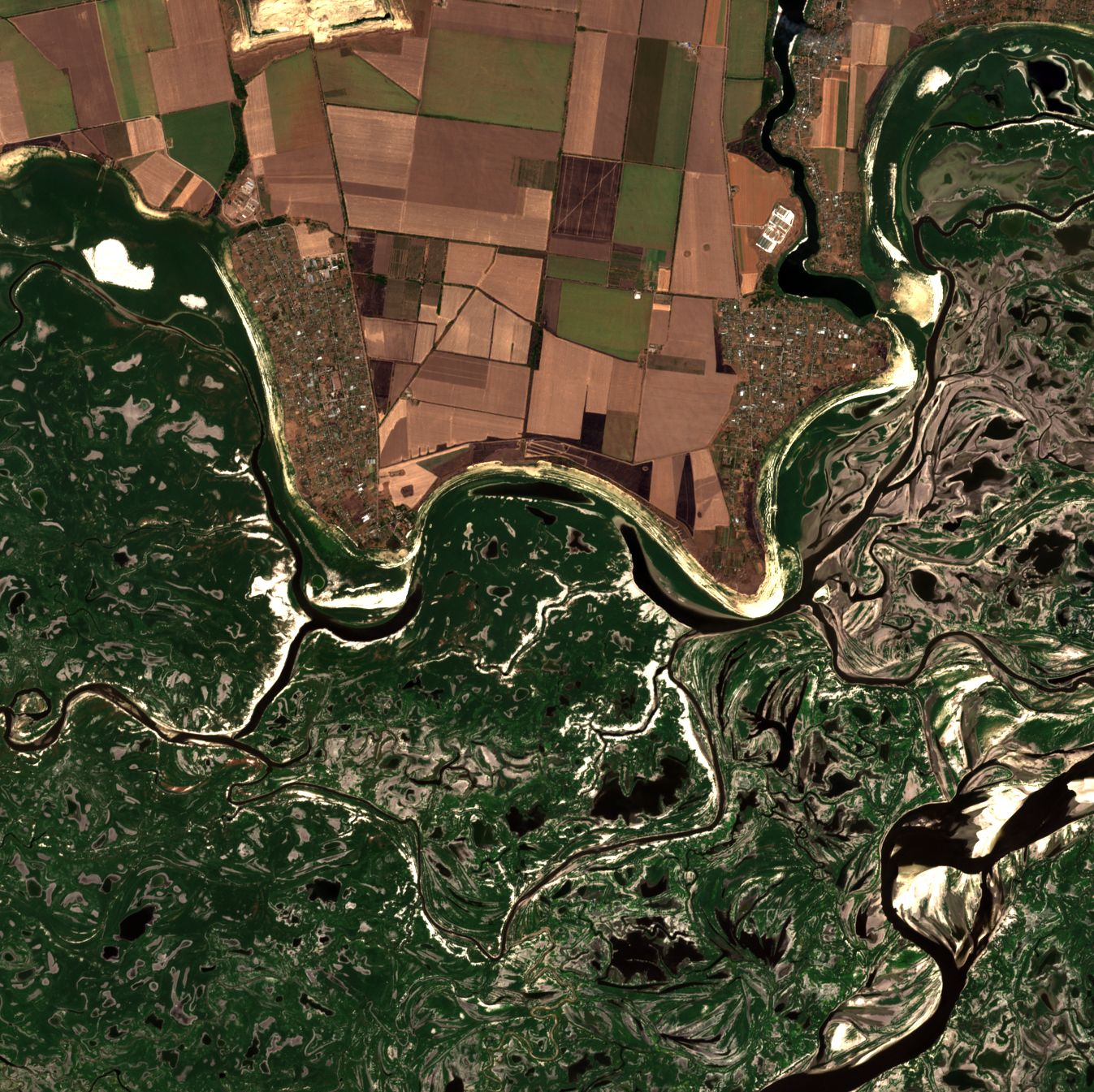
A satellite image of a section of the Great Meadow in 2024, showing new streams that have formed, and the return of forested areas

The destruction of the dam coincided with the time when poplar and willow trees begin to disperse their seeds. Young forests have reappeared in the area once occupied by the reservoir, and according to the ecologist Vadym Manyuk, animals and birds such as wild boars, ptarmigan and swallows are starting to live there. According to Manyuk, the floodplains of the Great Meadow originally consisted of strips of woodland that alternated with meadows, swamps, and, possibly steppe, which the appearance of the reservoir bed resembles today. "This will be a mosaic system. We need to support the meadows. Because there are a lot of rare and interesting species here, an inseparable part of our natural biodiversity. For such systems, I would like to see wild horses come here, perhaps. They would shape these beautiful meadow landscapes."

The area will go through ecological succession that, in at least 30 years, will result in the formation of a mature forest. This large-scale phenomenon allows the study of the development of forest ecosystems in river valleys that was not possible before. Left alone, the trees would continue to grow tall, but not at such a rate. Manyuk described the water levels as constantly fluctuating according to the seasons. The ecosystem currently being restored may resemble the state of the Lower Dnipro valley before it was settled by humans.

The Ukrainian government considers the HPP at Kakhovka to be a valuable capital asset, and intends in time for it to be fully restored, despite the negative ecological and socio-economic impact this would have. Hydrologists and power engineers support the reconstruction of the dam, but ecologists, historians, and archaeologists resist the idea and propose to restore area once occupied by the Great Meadow into a protected natural and historic area.

== Sources ==
- Allen, W.E.D (1940). The Ukraine: A History. London: Cambridge University Press.
- Babak, V.P.; Zaporozhets, Artur O., eds. (2024). Power Engineering and Environmental Safety. Systems, Decision and Control in Energy VI. Vol. 2. Springer. ISBN 978-3-031-67091-6.
- Kashchenko, Adrian Feofanovych (1917). Великий Луг запорожський [Great Meadow of Zaporozhia] (in Ukrainian) – via Wikisource.
- Kokin, Y. (1997). "Oleshkivska Sich". In Smolii, V.; Kulchitsky, S.; Mayboroda, O. (eds.). Малий словник історії України [A Small Dictionary of Ukrainian History] (in Ukrainian). Kyiv, Ukraine: Lybid. ISBN 978-5-325-00781-1.
- LeDonne, John P. (2003). The Grand Strategy of the Russian Empire, 1650-1831. Oxford, UK: Oxford University Press. ISBN 978-0-19-534769-2.
- Plokhy, Serhii (2017). The Gates of Europe: A History of Ukraine. London: Penguin Books. ISBN 978-0-465-09346-5.
- Shevchuk, Vasyl Yakovych; et al. (2004). Preserving the Dnipro River: Harmony, history and Rehabilitation. Oakville, Canada: Mosaic Press. ISBN 978-0-88962-827-4.
- Treffers, Fulco; Korchagin, Antoine; Usychenko, Svitlana; Mnatsakanian, Vaagn; van Epp, Tim; Buckley, Niall; Panchev, Hristo; Bondov, Angel (2024). Dnipro River Integrated Vision (PDF). Greenpeace.
- Vasyliuk, O.; et al. (2025). The Great Meadow vs. the Kakhovka Reservoir: A Modern Perspective (PDF). Ukraine Nature Conservation Society.; Ukrainian version
