= Adrian Kashchenko =

Ukrainian historian and writer (1858–1921)

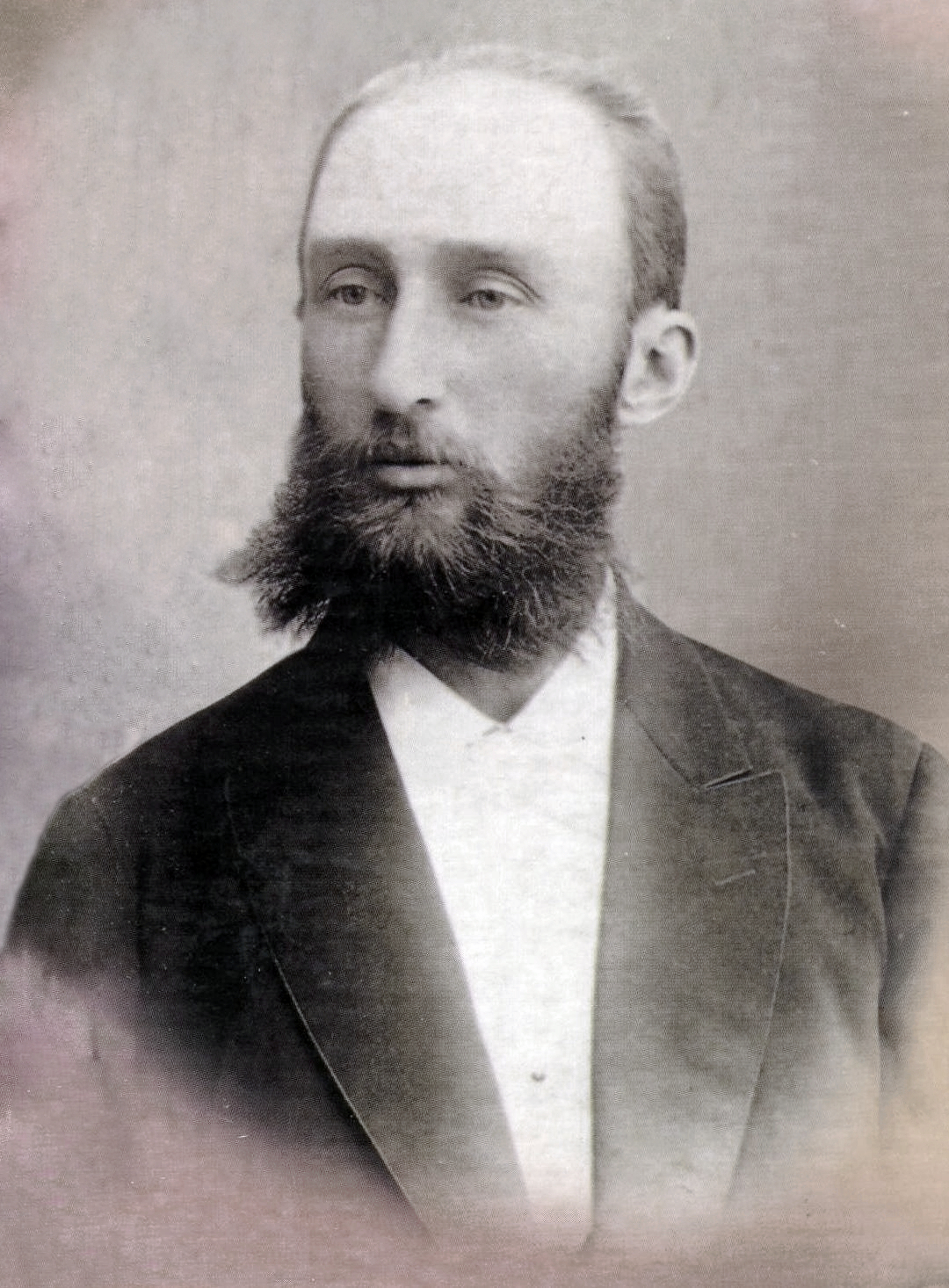
Adrian Kaschenko

Adrian Kashchenko (Ukrainian: Адріан Феофанович Кащенко; 19 September 1858 – 16 March 1921) was a well-known Ukrainian writer and historian of Zaporozhian Cossacks.

== Biography ==
Adrian Kashchenko was born in the family of small landowner claiming its roots to the Zaporozhian Cossacks in Yekaterinoslav Governorate (modern Dnipropetrovsk Oblast). Sharing the amongst nine siblings one of whom Mykola Kashchenko - would become a Ukrainian academician and the founder of Kyiv Botanical Gardens. Adrian studied several years in gymnasium and military college, served as a small rank officer. Not finding himself in military career, A. Kashchenko became a clerk in the railway department, married and settled in Yekaterinoslav for some time. During his railway service Kashchenko was transferred to Perm, Saint-Petersburg, Tuapse and back to Yekaterinoslav. Although he was married, his wife later left, though she remained financially dependent on him.

Kashchenko started writing in 1883, but achieved fame only after 1905, when bans against Ukrainian literature were lifted. His works were not distinguished by high literary quality, but their romantic character and easy mode of presentation made them widely popular, contributing to patriotic education of the youth. Kashchenko wrote both documentary and fiction stories about life of Zaporozhians and their environment. Among them short stories "Zaporozhska slava" ("Zaporizhian fame"), "Na ruinakh Sichi" ("On the ruins of Sich"), "Mandrivka na porohy" ("Trip to the sills"). At stories "Z Dnipra na Dunai" ("From Dnieper to Dunai"), "Zruinovane gnizdo" ("Ruined nest") where he attempted to show the negative aspects following the break-up of the Zaporozhian Host. Several documentary portraits of Cossack leaders were created: "Nad Kodatskim porohom" ("Under the Kodak sill") about Hetman Ivan Sulima, "Hetman Sahaidachny", "Kost Hordienko-Holovko - last knight of Zaporizhia".

Most of Adrian Kashchenko's works were published in 1917 - 1919, during the epoch of Ukraine after the Russian Revolution and Ukrainian People's Republic (previous attempts did not gain wide publication due to the censorship in the Russian Empire). At that time Kashchenko took part in the Ukrainian Prosvita ("Enlightenment") society activities and even founded his own publishing house. Sudden illness and subsequent death in 1921 put an end to his scientific and public career. Following his death, Kashchenko's works saw widespread publication in Galicia and among the Ukrainian diaspora. In Ukraine itself his texts became available to the public again only after the country became independent.

== Works of Adrian Kashchenko ==
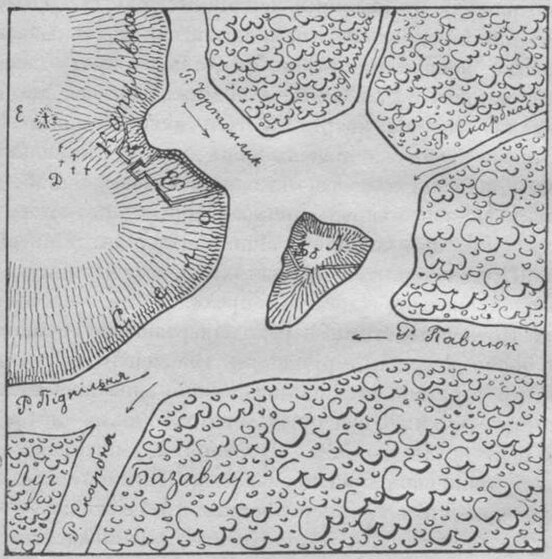
Plan of the vicinity of Bazavluk and Chortomlyk Sich from Kashchenko's book on the Great Meadow, 1917

- "The ruined nest" (Ukrainian: Зруйноване гніздо)
- "The Story about Zaporizhian Army" (Ukrainian: Оповідання про славне військо запорозьке)
- "From Dnieper to Dunai" (Ukrainian: З Дніпра на Дунай)
- "Under the Kodak sill" (Ukrainian: Над Кодацьким порогом)
- "Hetman Sahaidachny" (Ukrainian: Гетьман Сагайдачний)
- "Kost Hordienko-Holovko - last knight of Zaporizhia" (Ukrainian: Кость Гордієнко-Головко — останній лицар Запорожжя)
- "The Grand Meadow of Zaporizhia" (Ukrainian: Великий Луг Запорозький)
