= Kakhovka Irrigation System =

Irrigation system in southern Ukraine

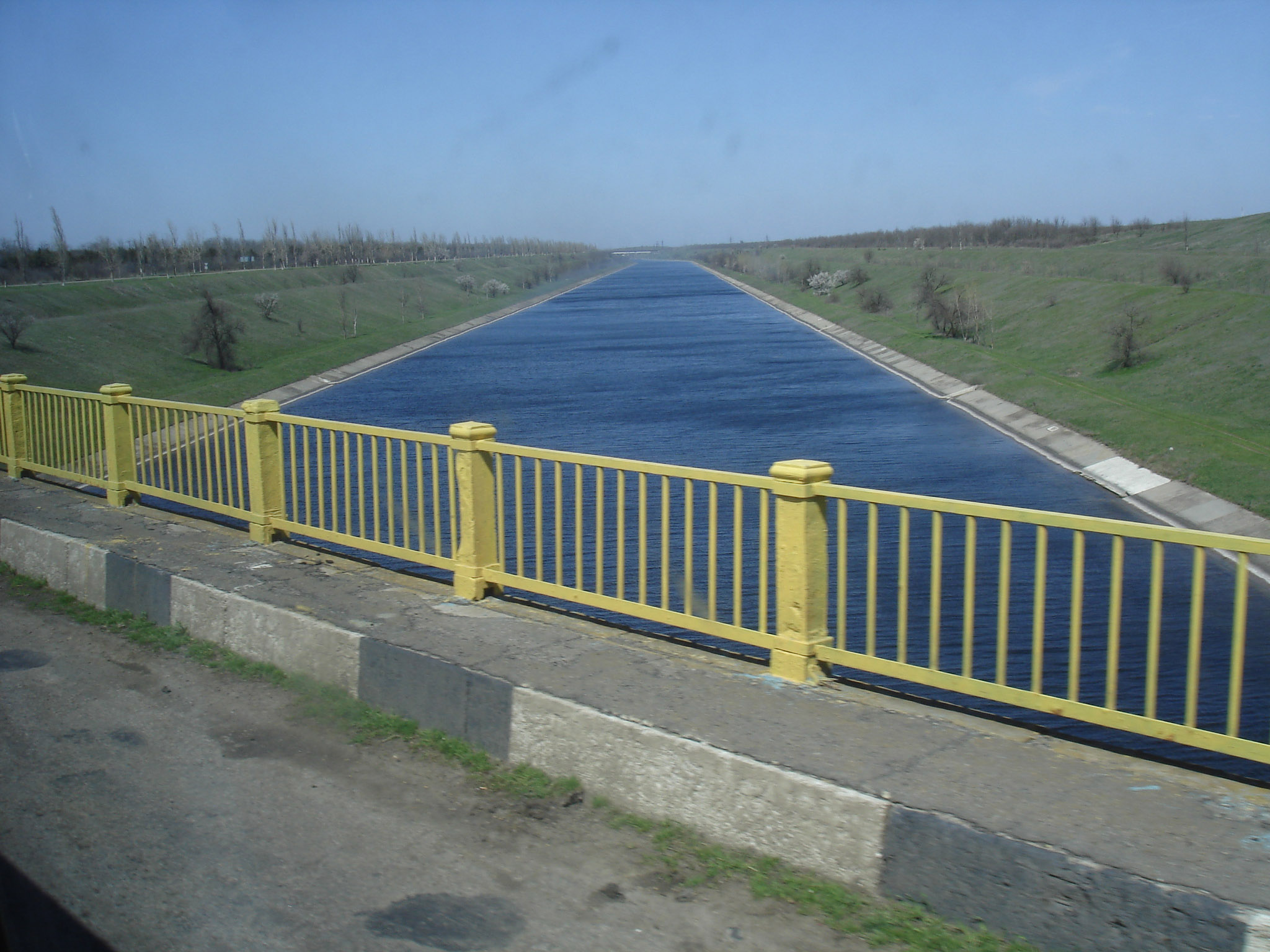
- Interactive map of Kakhovka Irrigation System
- Location: Kherson Oblast, Ukraine

Geography
- Start point: Kakhovka Reservoir
- End point: Various
- Beginning coordinates: 46°48′55″N 33°36′51″E
- Ending coordinates: Various

The Kakhovka Irrigation System (Ukrainian: Каховська зрошувальна система; Russian: Каховская оросительная система) is an irrigation system in southern Ukraine. With a total irrigation area of 780,000 hectares (1,900,000 acres), it is the largest irrigation system in the entire country.

== History ==
In 1951, construction began for the Kakhovka Hydroelectric Power Plant, which created the Kakhovka Reservoir and provided a water source for local irrigation. By 1967, construction for an irrigation system began, and different sections began operation throughout the 1970s.

== Characteristics ==
The irrigation system all begin at the Kakhovka Reservoir, where it flows south before diverging into different areas. The entire system includes many interconnected canals, such as the Kakhovka Canal, and it provides water for crops across much of Kherson Oblast.

Because of the vast size of the irrigation system, there are 16 pumping stations throughout the canals. This includes a main pumping station, which is sized 138 metres (453 ft) by 34 metres (112 ft).
