= Kakhovka Reservoir =

Reservoir in Ukraine

- Map of the Kakhovka Reservoir
- Interactive map of Kakhovka Reservoir
- Location: Kherson, Zaporizhzhia and Dnipropetrovsk oblasts
- Coordinates: 47°30′N 34°15′E
- Type: Hydroelectric reservoir
- Primary inflows: Dnieper River
- Primary outflows: Dnieper River
- Basin countries: Ukraine
- Max. length: 240 km (150 mi)
- Max. width: 23 km (14 mi)
- Surface area: 2,155 km^{2} (832 sq mi)
- Average depth: 8.4 m (28 ft)
- Max. depth: 26 m (85 ft)
- Water volume: 18.2 km^{3} (14,800,000 acre⋅ft)
- Surface elevation: 16 m (52 ft)

The Kakhovka Reservoir (Ukrainian: Каховське водосховище, romanized: Kakhovs'ke vodoskhovyshche) was a water reservoir on the Dnieper River in Ukraine. It was created in 1956 by construction of the Kakhovka Dam at Nova Kakhovka. It was one of several reservoirs in the Dnieper reservoir cascade.

The dam was breached on 6 June 2023, which consensus attributes to Russian forces mining and blowing the base of the dam, while Russia alternatively described it as a "terrorist" act, in the case of the Russian-installed mayor of Nova Kakhovka, or as caused by a lack of maintenance, in the case of the Russian government. By the end of June, the reservoir was completely dry.

== Geography ==
The reservoir covered a total area of 2,155 km^{2} (832 sq mi) in the Kherson, Zaporizhzhia, and Dnipropetrovsk oblasts of Ukraine. It was 240 km (150 mi) long and up to 23 km (14 mi) wide. The depth varied from 3 to 26 m (9.8 to 85.3 ft; 1.6 to 14.2 fathoms) and averaged 8.4 m (28 ft; 4.6 fathoms). The total water volume was 18.2 km^{3} (4.4 cu mi). The Kakhovka dam has resulted in the natural water level of the Dnieper River being raised 16 m (52 ft). Locals sometimes referred to the reservoir as the Kakhovka Sea (Ukrainian: Каховське море, romanized: Kakhovs'ke more) as the other side of the river bank could not be seen at some points.

It was used mainly to supply hydroelectric stations, the Krasnoznamianka Irrigation System, the Kakhovka Irrigation System, industrial plants such as the 5.7 GW Zaporizhzhia Nuclear Power Plant, freshwater fish farms, the North Crimean Canal and the Dnipro – Kryvyi Rih Canal. Its creation formed a deep-water route for ships to sail up the Dnieper.

== History ==
The reservoir's construction had submerged archaeological sites, including Scythian pots and Cossack fortifications. Mykhailo Mulenko, head of the conservation department at the Khortytsia nature reserve, has argued that the Soviet Union deliberately submerged these sites to erase Ukraine's pre-Russian history. These sites have re-emerged after the dam was breached and the reservoir was drained.

== Russian invasion of Ukraine ==
The Russia–Ukraine war has had a profound impact on water resources and water infrastructure.

Beginning in early November 2022, following the start of the Russian invasion of Ukraine, Russia opened the spillways at the Kakhovka Hydroelectric Power Plant and the reservoir dropped to its lowest level in thirty years, putting at risk irrigation and drinking water resources as well as the coolant systems for the Zaporizhzhia Nuclear Power Plant. From 1 December 2022 to 6 February 2023, the water level dropped 2 m (6.6 ft; 1.1 fathoms). The purpose of the discharge was unclear. It could have been a way to harm Ukrainian agriculture, but most of the affected agricultural areas were in Russian-held parts of Ukraine as of early 2023. The Zaporizhzhia Regional Military Administration suggested that the motive might have been in part to flood the area south of the dam in order to keep Ukrainian Forces from crossing the Dnipro River. After reaching a low point the water level began to rise after the Ukrainian government began filling it with water from other reservoirs on the Dnipro River. "All of this poses a threat of lowering the water level to a critical level throughout the whole cascade of Dnipro reservoirs in Ukraine," said Ukraine's Ministry of Environmental Protection and Natural Resources.

From mid-February to late May 2023, either deliberately or as a result of neglect, the damaged dam at Nova Kakhovka was not adjusted to match the seasonal increase in water flow. As a result, water washed over the top of the dam and land upstream of the dam was flooded. Water levels in the reservoir reached a 30-year high.

=== Dam destruction ===
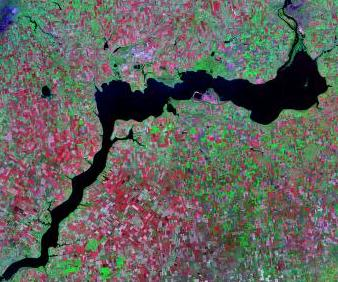
Landsat Kakhovka Water Reservoir

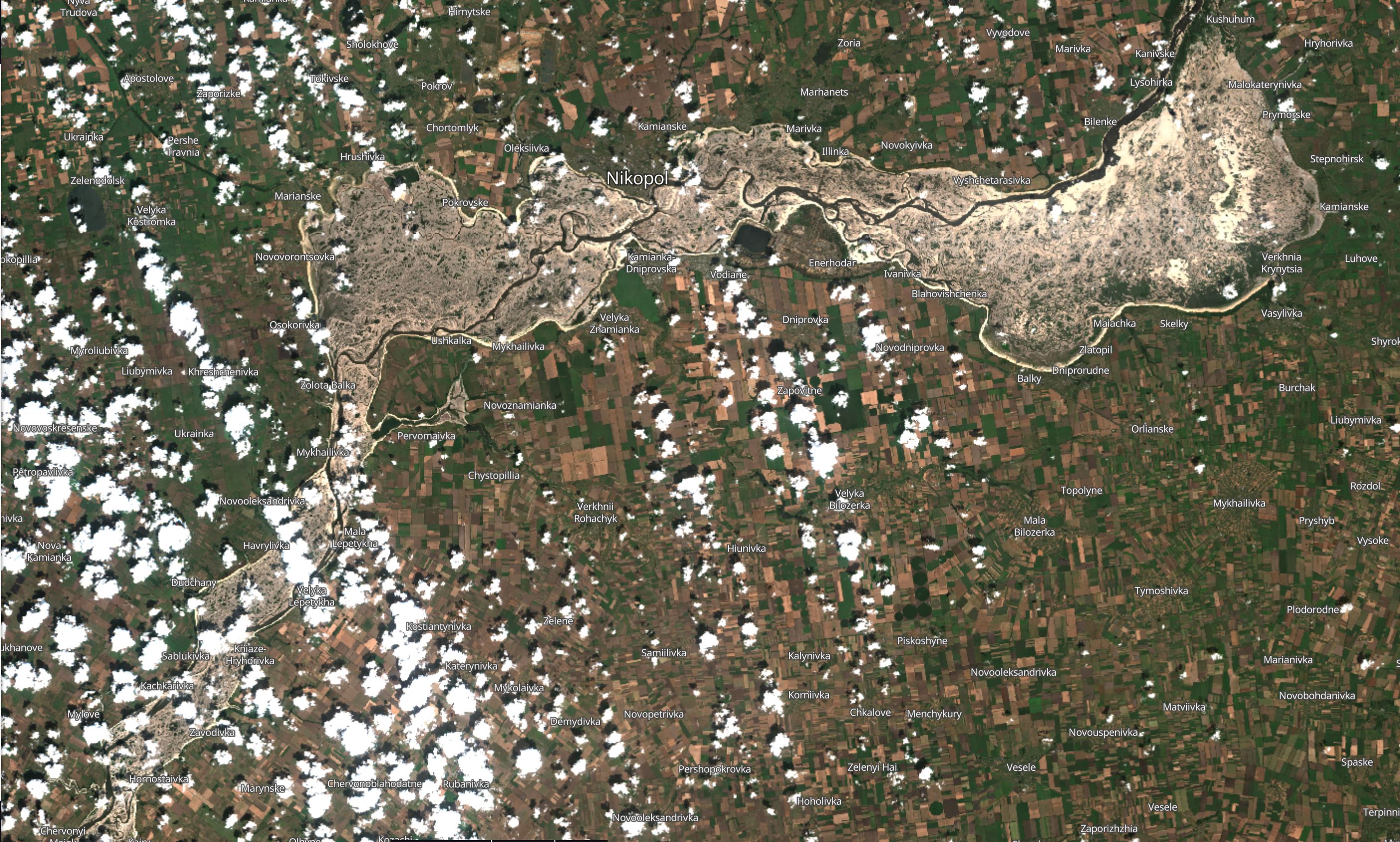
Sentinel-2 L2A satellite image taken on 2023-07-15 and shown as True Colour (band 4,3,2).

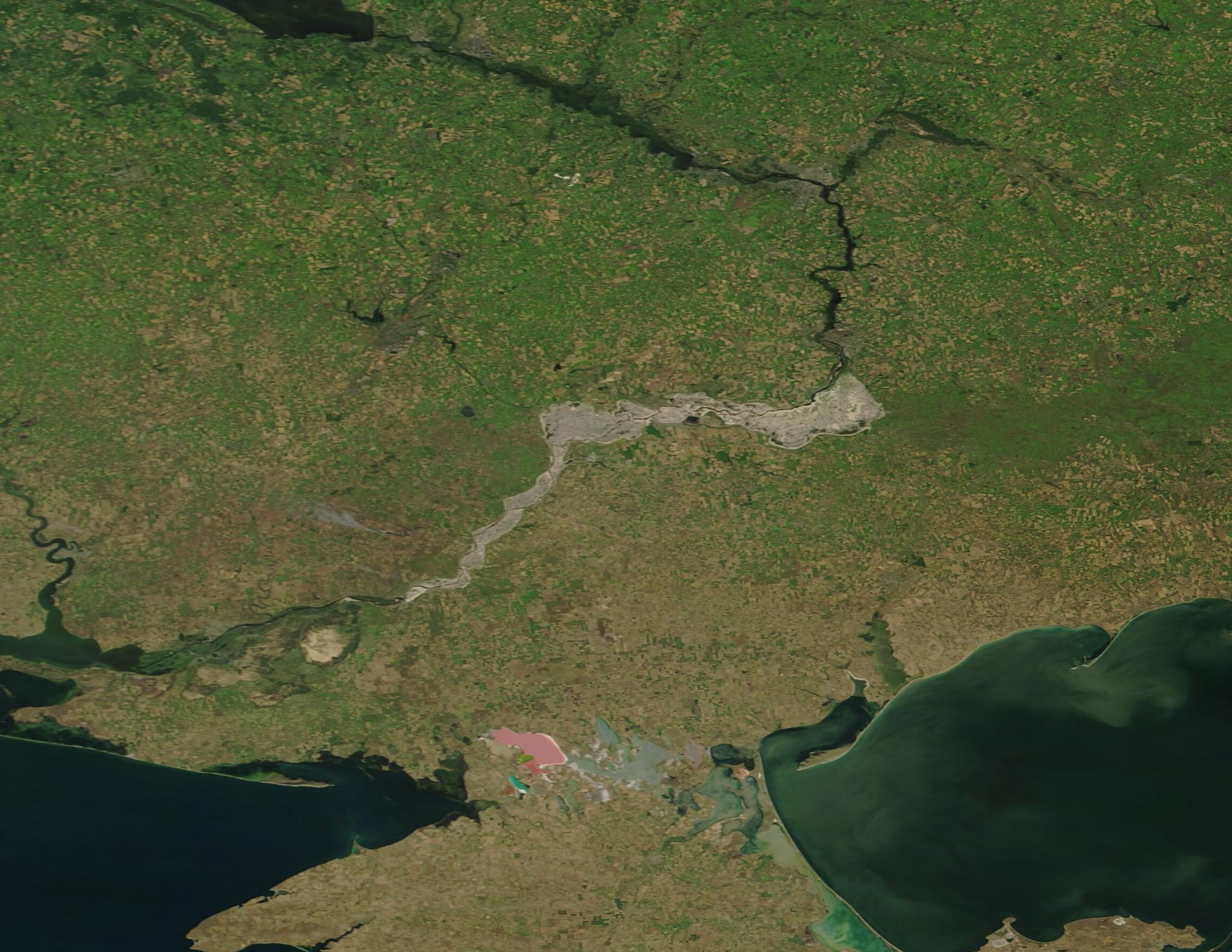
Satellite photo of the Kakhovka Reservoir on 8 August 2023, now completely dried up, revealing the Great Meadow.

In the early morning of 6 June 2023, a large section of the dam was destroyed, causing an uncontrolled release of water downstream. Russia and Ukraine blamed each other for its destruction. The dam was under the control of Russian forces. By 21 June, satellite images revealed that the reservoir had significantly dried up, exposing shallower parts, revealing the original course of the Dnipro and leading to the disconnection of four canal networks.

Within months newly dry lakebed was quickly colonised by various plants, including poplars and willows, creating varied habitats potentially reminiscent of the pre-dam forests and marshes. This rewilding has led to debate over whether the dam and reservoir should be reconstructed in full, altered to a series of smaller dams and reservoirs, or left as is. In March 2024 a law was passed prohibiting the construction of anything bar the original purpose on the former reservoir, a law which is written to remain in effect until five years after the end of martial law.

== Gallery ==
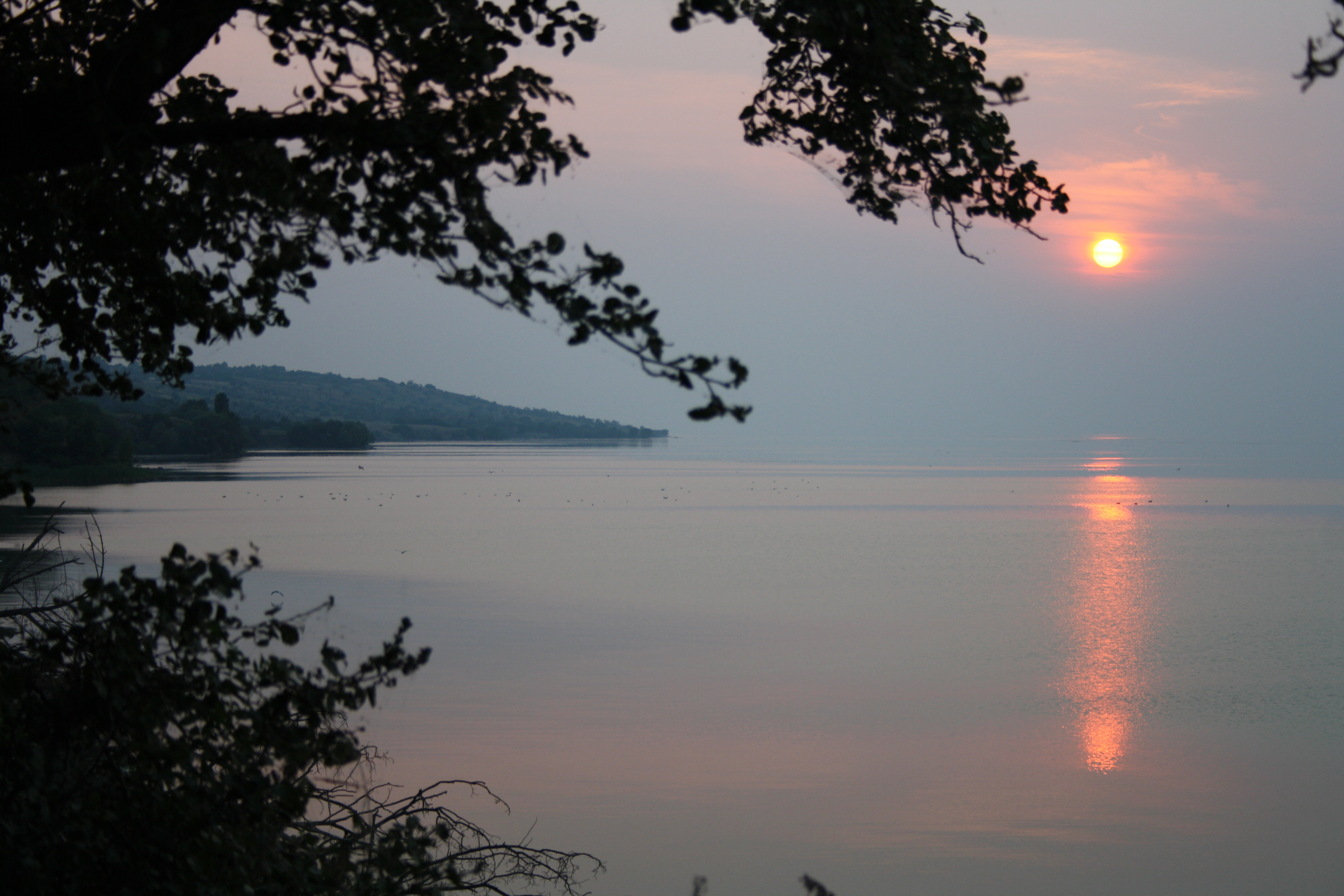

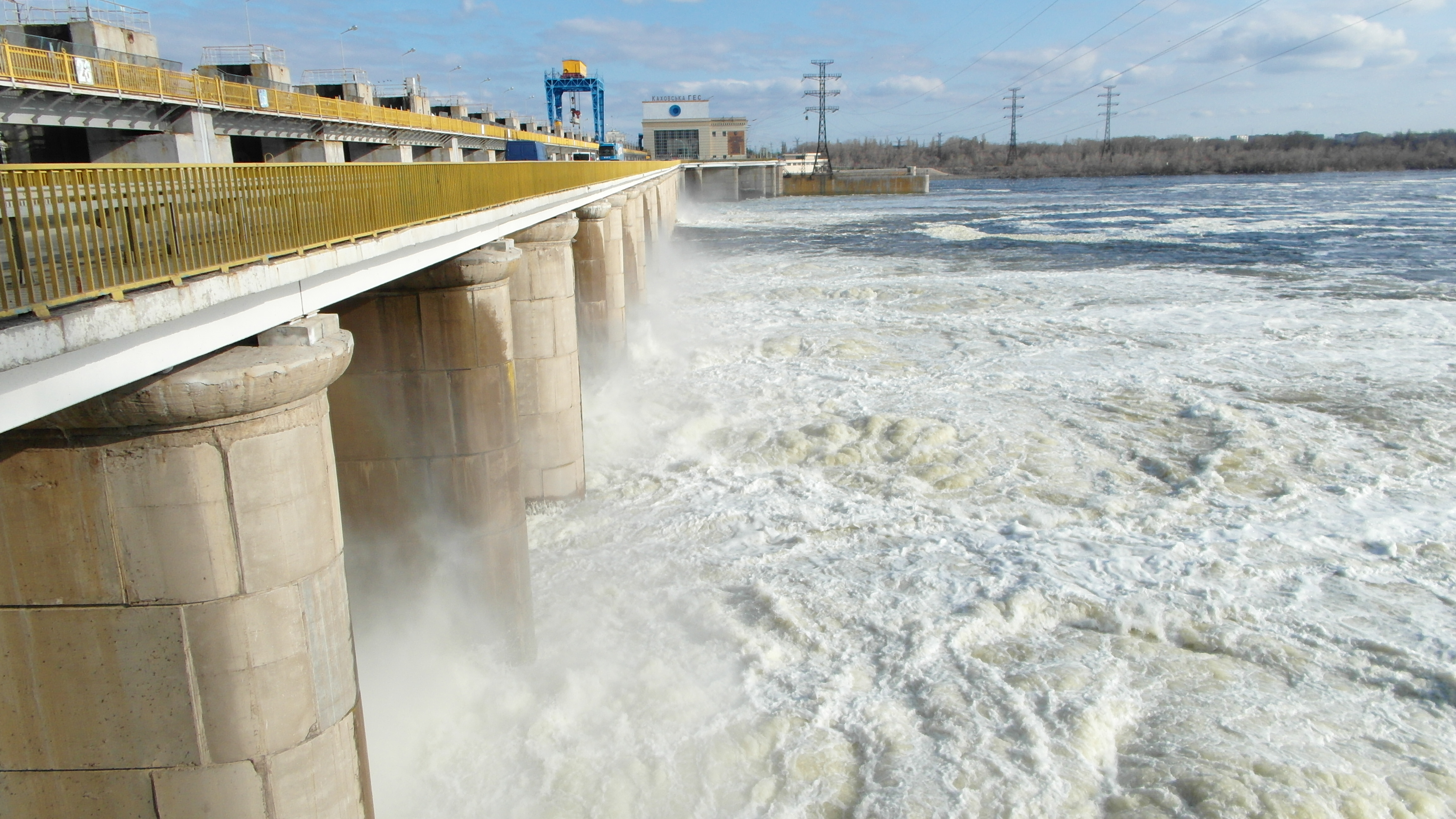

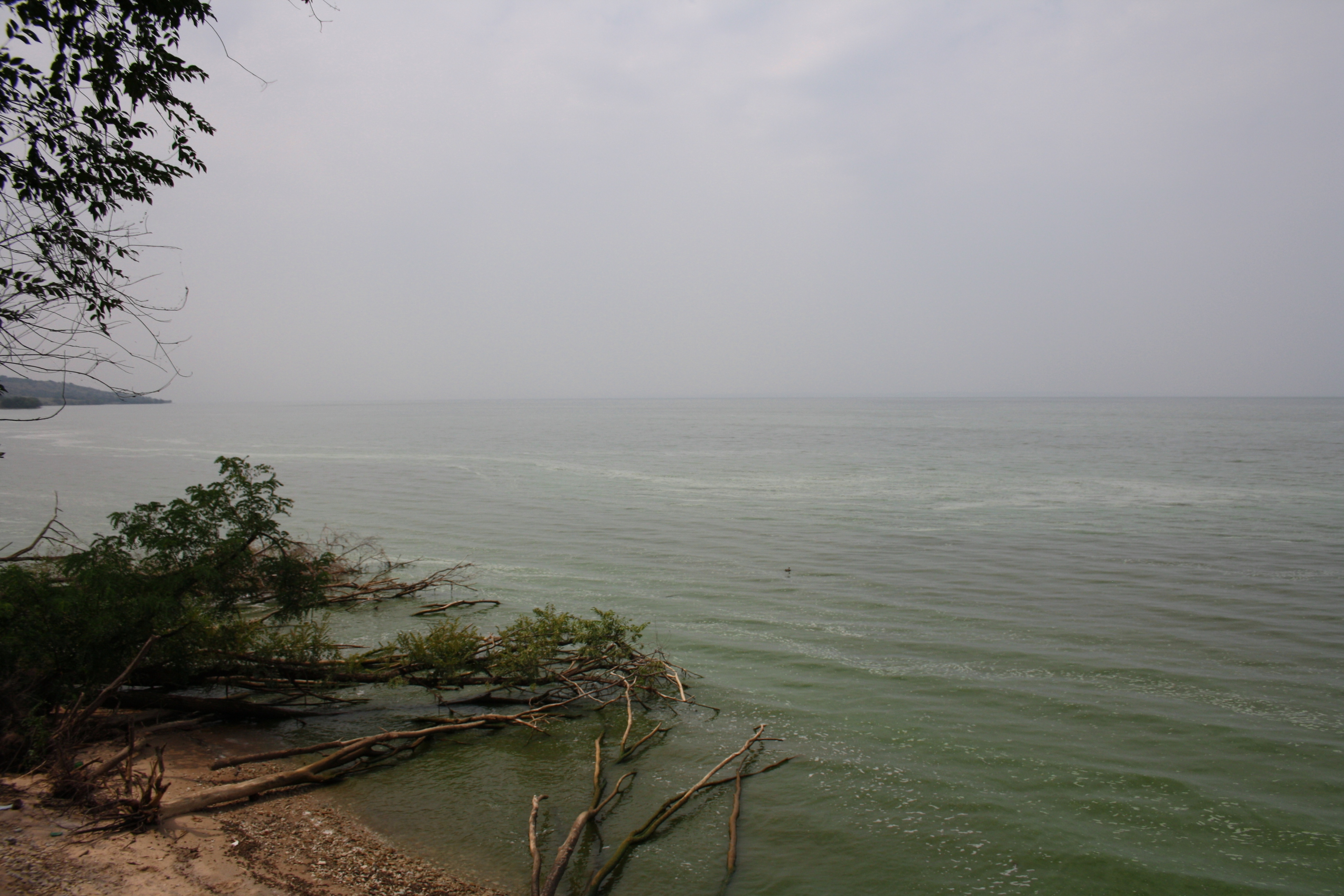

== See also ==
- List of reservoirs by volume
- Energy in Ukraine
- Renewable energy in Ukraine
- Attack on Nova Kakhovka
