= Dnipro – Inhulets Canal =

Canal in central Ukraine

- Location: Kirovohrad Oblast, Ukraine

Specifications
- Length: 150 km (93 miles)

History
- Date completed: 1988

Geography
- Direction: South
- Start point: Dnipro River
- End point: Inhulets River
- Beginning coordinates: 48°59′02″N 33°09′22″E
- Ending coordinates: 48°44′02″N 33°02′46″E

The Dnipro – Inhulets Canal (Ukrainian: Канал Дніпро — Інгулець), also known as the Dnieper – Ingulets Canal (Russian: Канал Днепр — Ингулец), is a canal in central Ukraine, and connects the Dnipro River with the Inhulets River.

== History ==
The canal was completed in 1988, and is mainly used for irrigation and supplying water to residences and industries in nearby areas.

== Characteristics ==
The canal begins at the Kremenchuk Reservoir on the Dnipro River, where it flows south to near Oleksandriia on the Inhulets River. The total length of the canal is about 150 kilometres (93 mi).
