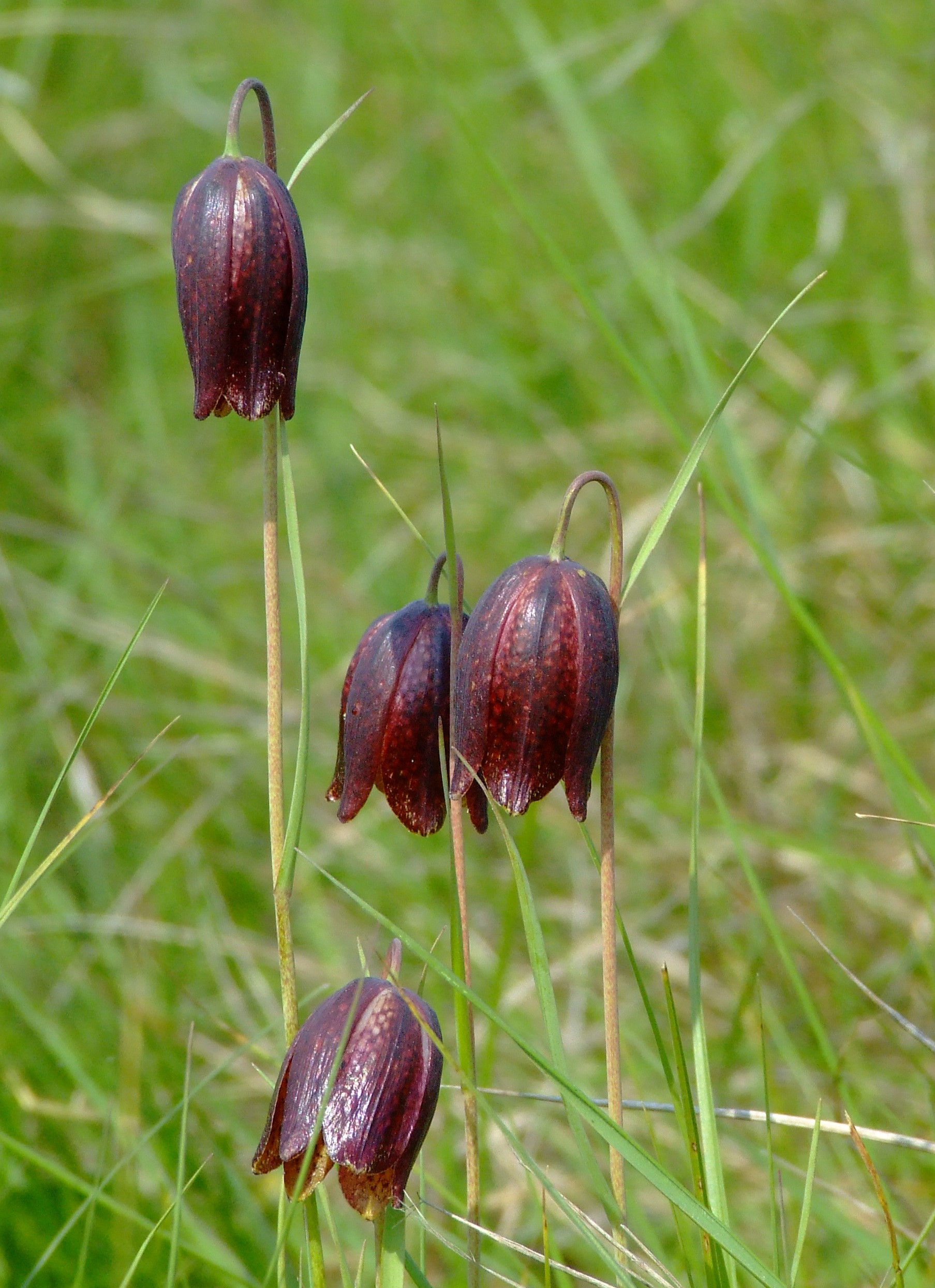

Scientific classification
- Kingdom: Plantae
- Clade: Tracheophytes
- Clade: Angiosperms
- Clade: Monocots
- Order: Liliales
- Family: Liliaceae
- Subfamily: Lilioideae
- Tribe: Lilieae
- Genus: Fritillaria
- Species: F. meleagroides

Binomial name
- Fritillaria meleagroides Patrin ex Schult. & Schult.f.

Synonyms
- Synonymy: Fritillaria longifolia Steven ex Ledeb. 1852, illegitimate homonym not Hill 1768; Fritillaria meleagroides var. flavovirens X.Z.Duan & X.J.Zheng; Fritillaria meleagroides var. plena X.Z.Duan & X.J.Zheng; Fritillaria meleagroides var. rhodantha X.Z.Duan & X.J.Zheng

= Fritillaria meleagroides =

Species of flowering plant

Fritillaria meleagroides is a Eurasian species of flowering plant in the lily family Liliaceae, native to Xinjiang, Russia (Altay Krai, Western Siberia Krai, European Russia, North Caucasus), Kazakhstan, Ukraine, and Bulgaria.

Fritillaria meleagroides is a bulb-producing perennial up to 40 cm tall. The leaves are linear, alternate, up to 15 cm long. The flowers are nodding (hanging), bell-shaped, dark purple or brownish-purple.
