= Dnipro – Kryvyi Rih Canal =

Canal in central Ukraine

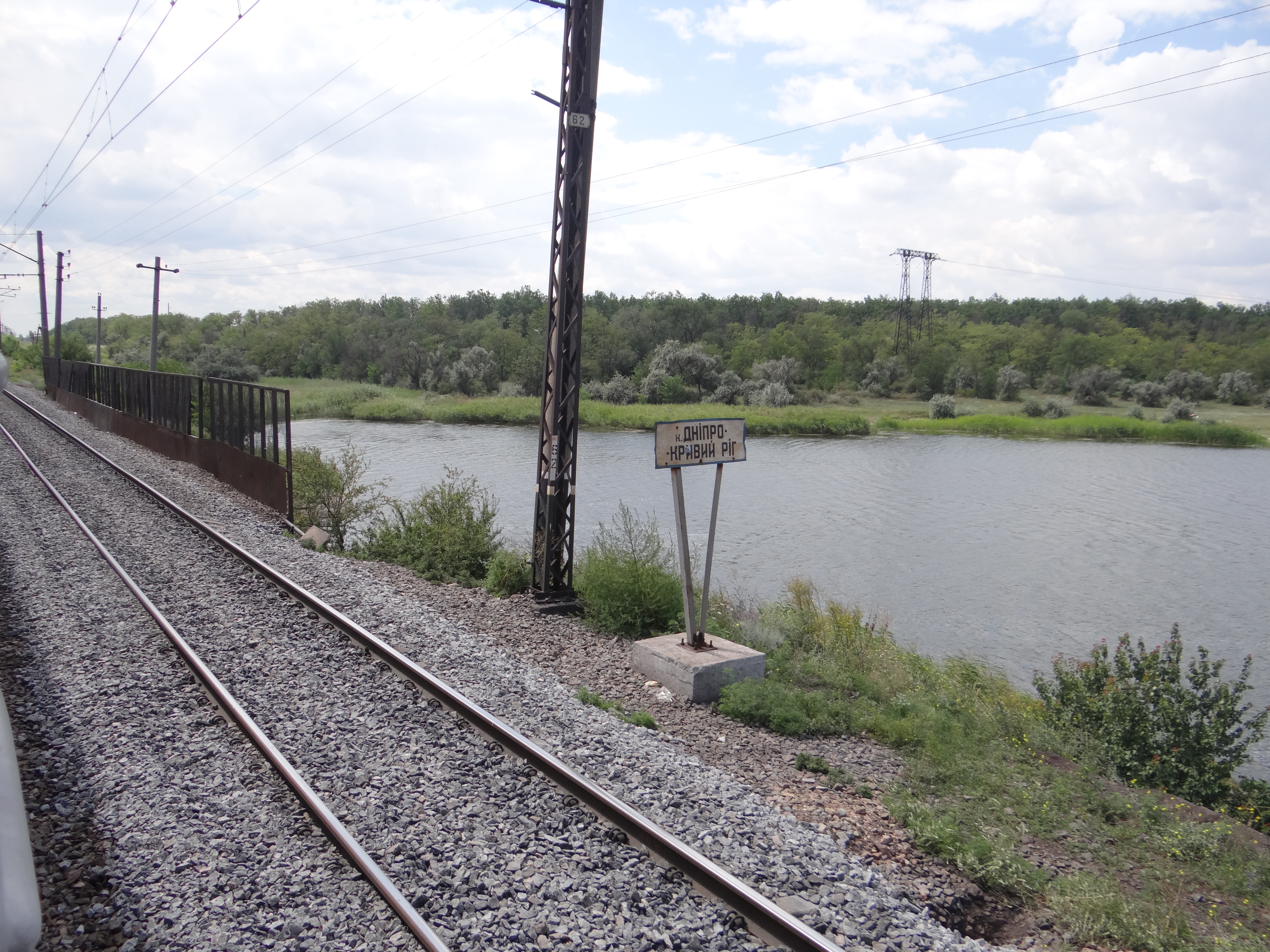
- Railroad tracks crossing the canal
- Interactive map of Dnipro – Kryvyi Rih Canal
- Location: Dnipropetrovsk Oblast, Ukraine

Specifications
- Length: 41.3 km (25.7 miles)

History
- Date completed: 1960

Geography
- Direction: Northwest
- Start point: Dnipro River
- End point: Kryvyi Rih
- Beginning coordinates: 47°33′51″N 33°54′37″E
- Ending coordinates: 47°46′53″N 33°33′19″E

The Dnipro – Kryvyi Rih Canal (Ukrainian: Канал Дніпро — Кривий Ріг), also known as the Dnieper – Krivoy Rog Canal (Russian: Канал Днепр — Кривой Рог), is a canal in central Ukraine mainly used for supplying water to the city of Kryvyi Rih.

== History ==
Construction of the canal began in 1957, and was completed by 1960. The canal also underwent renovations in the 1970s.

== Characteristics ==
The canal begins at the Kakhovka Reservoir, and moves northwest to near the city of Kryvyi Rih.

The width of the canal is about 4 metres (13 ft), while the depth varies between 3.6 metres (12 ft) and 4.3 metres (14 ft).
