= Kakhovka Canal =

Canal in Kherson Oblast, Ukraine

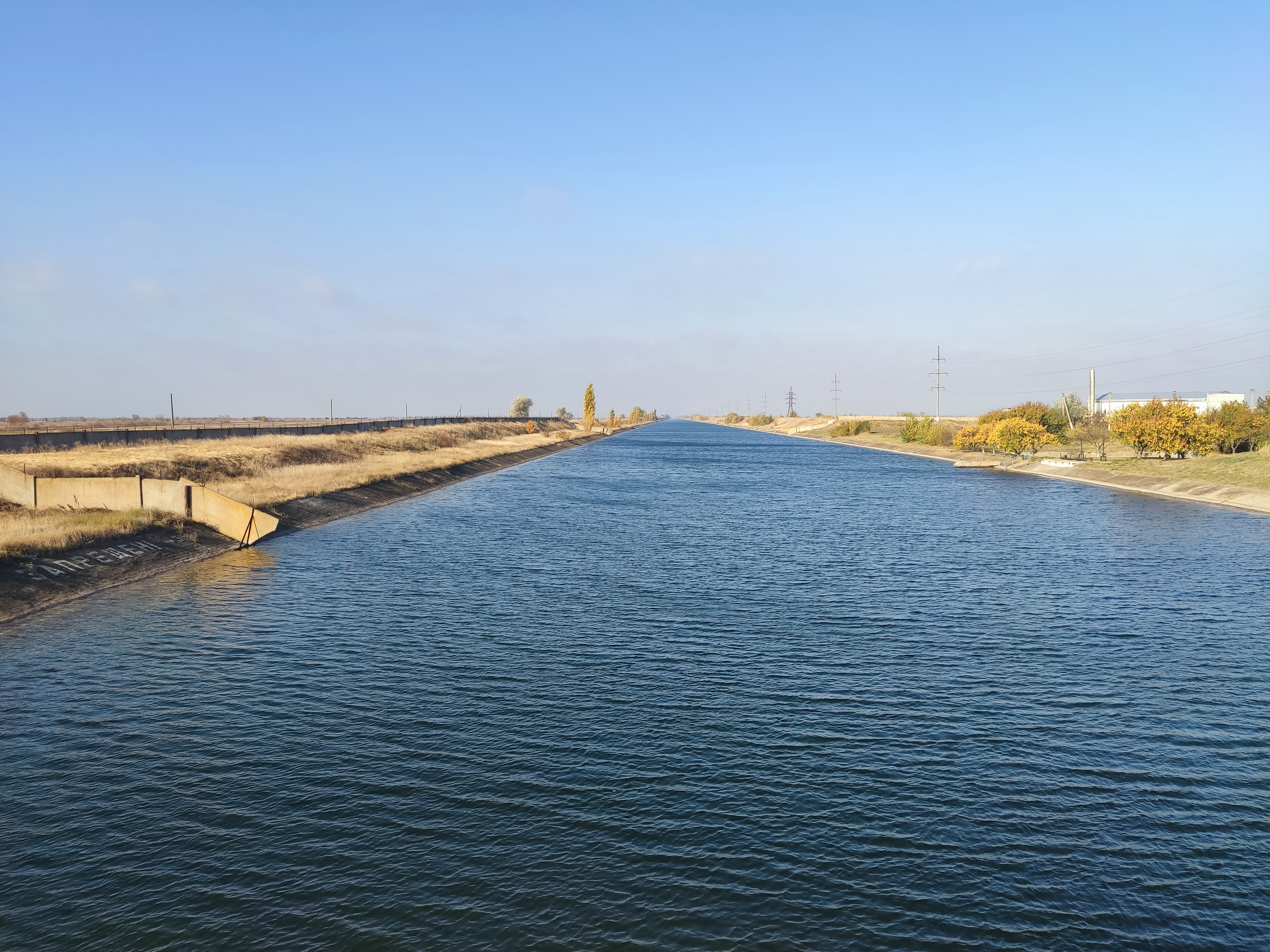
- Interactive map of Kakhovka Canal
- Location: Kherson Oblast, Ukraine

Specifications
- Length: 130 km (81 miles)

History
- Date completed: 1979

Geography
- Direction: East
- Start point: Dnipro river
- End point: Sea of Azov
- Beginning coordinates: 46°48′55″N 33°36′51″E
- Ending coordinates: 46°25′31″N 35°03′47″E

The Kakhovka Canal (Ukrainian: Каховський канал) is a canal in southern Ukraine connecting between the Dnipro river and the Sea of Azov. It has a total length of 130 kilometres (81 mi), and is a part of the Kakhovka Irrigation System that provides irrigation for farmlands in much of Kherson Oblast.

== History ==
The canal was completed in 1979, and provides water for 195,000 hectares (480,000 acres) of farmland.

In 2022, during the Russian invasion of Ukraine, the Russian military blew up the main pumping station used for the canal. As a result, much of the units responsible for running the canal were flooded.
