= 2022 Kherson counteroffensive =

2022 offensive in the Russo-Ukrainian war

- Part of the southern front of the Russo-Ukrainian war
- Map of Kherson Oblast in late 2022, with the right bank of the Dnieper (green) fully liberated by Ukrainian troops
Date	29 August – 11 November 2022 (2 months, 1 week and 6 days)
Location	Kherson and Mykolaiv oblasts, Ukraine
Result	Ukrainian victory

Belligerents
Ukraine	Russia: Donetsk PR; Luhansk PR

Commanders and leaders
(Ukraine) Andrii Kovalchuk (Ukraine) Oleksandr Tarnavskyi	Unknown

Units involved
(Ukraine) Kakhovka operational group (Ukraine) Separate Special Purpose Battalion (Ukraine) Khyzhak Brigade	(Russia) 49th Combined Arms Army (Russia) 76th Guards Air Assault Division (Russia) 83rd Guards Air Assault Brigade (Russia) 126th Coastal Defence Brigade (Donetsk People's Republic) 109th Regiment

Strength
20,000 (start of the offensive)	20,000–25,000; 40,000 (October, per Ukraine)

Casualties and losses
Per Russia: 9,500 killed and wounded	Per Russia: 1,200–1,360 killed and wounded Per Ukraine: 2,500 killed, 5,000 wounded (29 Aug.–29 Sept.)

A military counteroffensive was launched by Ukraine on 29 August 2022 to expel Russian forces occupying the southern regions of Kherson and Mykolaiv oblasts.

Military analysts consider the counteroffensive to be the third strategic phase of the war in Ukraine, along with the concurrent eastern counteroffensive, after the initial invasion and the battle of Donbas.

After many strikes against Russian military targets, Ukraine announced the start of a full-scale counteroffensive on 29 August 2022. On 9 October, Ukraine said it recaptured 1,170 square kilometers of land. On 9 November, Russian troops were ordered to withdraw from Kherson, the only regional capital captured since the start of the invasion. Ukrainian forces liberated the city of Kherson two days later, on 11 November.

== Background ==
=== Russian offensive ===
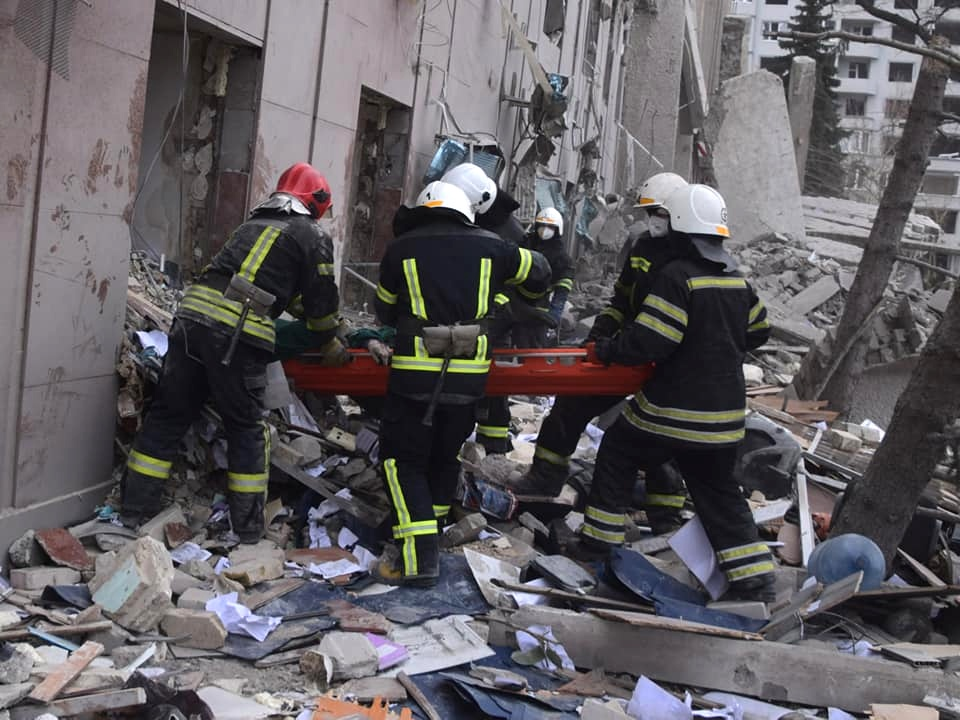
First responders work after the Mykolaiv government building airstrike, 29 March 2022.

During the 2022 southern Ukraine offensive, Russian troops invaded the Kherson, Zaporizhzhia, and Mykolaiv Oblasts. In the early days of the war, Russian troops captured several cities in southern Ukraine, including Melitopol and Kherson, pushing Ukrainian troops back to the city of Mykolaiv. The Russian forces originally aimed towards capturing the major port city of Odesa from the southeast, but were forced back following their defeat at the battle of Voznesensk, and ultimately only succeeded in occupying a small part of Mykolaiv Oblast, notably including the town of Snihurivka. In Zaporizhzhia Oblast, Russian troops pushed north and successfully defeated Ukrainian servicemen at the Battle of Enerhodar, thus seizing the city and the adjacent Zaporizhzhia Nuclear Power Plant, the largest nuclear plant in continental Europe. Russian forces also pushed east, reaching the Donetsk/Zaporizhzhia administrative borders, thereby creating a land bridge connecting Crimea with the Russian mainland.

==== Russian occupation ====
Russian forces began an occupation of Kherson Oblast on 2 March, and the occupation authorities immediately began to consolidate their control over these territories. The authorities reportedly erected a statue of Vladimir Lenin in the town square, introduced Russian curriculum to the local school system, rerouted internet servers to Russia, issued Russian passports, and began circulating the Russian ruble. There were also widespread allegations of Russian authorities abducting hundreds of Ukrainian civilians across occupied territories. By early July, Russia controlled 95% of Kherson Oblast, 70% of Zaporizhzhia Oblast and 10% of Mykolaiv Oblast.

==== Annexation ====
In late May, Russian government officials acknowledged plans to annex all three oblasts and were reportedly setting conditions on occupied territory within Zaporizhzhia. A referendum was reportedly planned by Russian occupation authorities in the region for late 2022 to annex Kherson and Zaporizhzhia oblasts, while the occupied parts of the Mykolaiv Oblast would be included in the Kherson MSA, but officials soon moved the date forwards to autumn amid fears of being set back by the Ukrainian Army, according to U.K. intelligence officials. These referendums were held from 23 to 27 September, with Russia officially annexing Donetsk, Luhansk, Zaporizhzhia and Kherson Oblasts about a week later on 5 October. Western governments denounced the referendums as illegitimate and refused to recognize its results, and their illegitimacy was later confirmed with the adoption of United Nations General Assembly Resolution ES-11/4.

=== Ukrainian counterattacks ===
By 11 March the Russian offensive had stalled on numerous fronts within Mykolaiv Oblast, prompting gradual retreat by the end of the month. By the end of March, eleven settlements in the northern portion of the Kherson Oblast had been recaptured by the Ukrainian military's 60th Brigade, including Novovorontsovka, Krasnivka, Kniazivka, and Kochubeivka. In April, Ukrainian authorities said they had pushed the enemy southwards to the border with Kherson Oblast.

In late May, Ukraine launched minor attacks on the border between Zaporizhzhia and Donetsk Oblasts.

By 1 June, the Institute for the Study of War had assessed that Ukrainian counterattacks in Kherson Oblast had successfully disrupted Russian ground lines of communication along the Inhulets river. Throughout June, small parts of northwestern Kherson and northern Zaporizhzhia oblasts were regained by Ukrainian forces, with fierce fighting around Davydiv Brid. However, the main line of Russian defenses did not retreat as initially planned. Before 9 July, Ukraine had conducted numerous small counterattacks on Russian forces, pushing them into defensive positions. By 25 July, the region's military governor claimed that Ukraine had retaken 44 towns and villages, or 15 percent of the region's territory.

=== Partisan warfare ===
There were numerous reports of partisan warfare within the occupied territories. In the city of Melitopol, Ukrainian resistance leaders claimed to have killed 100 Russian soldiers by 5 June. In Kherson, Ukrainian sources claimed that resistance fighters bombed a café frequented by Russian troops, killing Russian collaborators and destroying Russian military infrastructure. Assassination attempts and bombings have also been carried out on collaborators. On 30 August, shootouts and explosions were recorded in the city, which Russian officials attributed to "spies and saboteurs".

== Prelude ==
Ukrainian officials first hinted at a large-scale military offensive in mid-to-late June, saying that "visible results" should be expected from Ukrainian counteroffensives by August 2022. A Ukrainian general stated on 15 June that if Ukraine were supplied sufficient weapons, it would be able to mount a massive counteroffensive by the summer.

On 5 July, Ukraine launched a major bombing campaign against Russian outposts in Melitopol, reportedly killing 200 soldiers. On 7 July, Ukraine retook Snake Island, affording Ukraine access to valuable sea channels and grain export lanes.

Meanwhile, Russia tried to strengthen its hold on Kherson and Zaporizhzhia Oblasts. Russia stated that babies born in Kherson Oblast would automatically receive Russian citizenship, implying that Kherson was a part of the Russian Federation.

=== Speculation of counteroffensive ===
In the morning of 9 July, Ukrainian government authorities began to urge residents of Kherson and Zaporizhzhia Oblasts to evacuate from their homes due to an impending Ukrainian counteroffensive. Residents of occupied Kherson in particular were urged to create shelters to "survive the Ukrainian counteroffensive". Iryna Vereshchuk, Ukrainian deputy prime minister and Minister of Reintegration of Temporarily Occupied Territories, warned of intense fighting and shelling in the upcoming days, claiming that the "ZSU is coming".

On 9 July, Ukrainian president Volodymyr Zelenskyy ordered the Ukrainian military, including elements of Operational Command South, to retake occupied territory. On the same day, Ukrainian Minister of Defense Oleksii Reznikov stated that Ukraine was amassing a million-strong fighting force for the offensive. Later, Reznikov said that there was a misunderstanding during his interview, and that 1 million is the total manpower of the Ukrainian "security and defense sector". He also denied that there was a "specific offensive operation".

On 24 July, Serhii Khlan, a Kherson region official, stated that "the Kherson region will definitely be liberated by September, and all the occupiers' plans will fail".

Writing a few months later in The Atlantic, military historian Phillips O'Brien remarked that it was unusual for a side to openly signal an intended offensive. He suggested that by encouraging the Russians to bring soldiers to the western side of the Dnieper and then attacking the bridges, it was creating a trap for them.

=== Early engagements ===
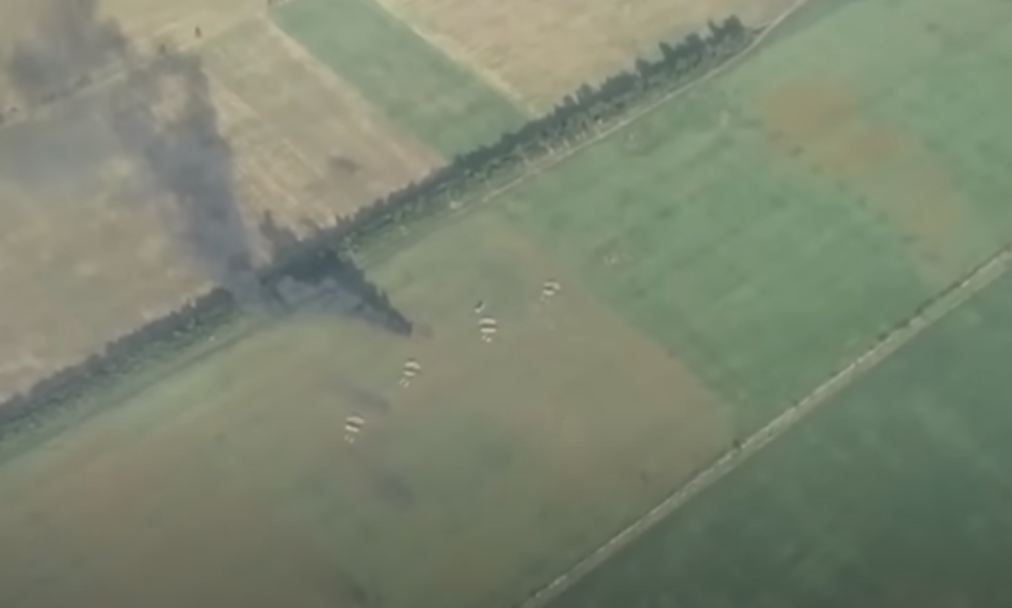
Ukrainian bombardment of the Russian arsenal in Mykolaiv Oblast, July 13, 2022

In early July, the Ukrainian army engaged in minor skirmishes with Russian forces. On 11 July, the Ukrainian army reported that it had recaptured the village of Ivanivka in Kherson Oblast. Ukrainian troops struck Nova Kakhovka, a Russian command post in Kherson city, with HIMARS missiles, and claimed it killed 12 officers and a Russian major general. By the afternoon, Ukrainian authorities claimed that Russian forces were transferring equipment to the left bank of the Dnieper, creating roadblocks within Kherson city in preparation for street battles. Ukrainian authorities urged civilians in Zaporizhzhia Oblast to evacuate, suggesting that a major counteroffensive was soon to come. On 13 July, the head of the Kherson regional military administration claimed that Ukraine launched counterattacks along the entire Mykolaiv–Kherson–Zaporizhzhia front line.

Ukrainian forces destroyed a Russian ammunition depot in Radensk (approximately 26 km (16 mi) southeast of Kherson City) and unspecified Russian positions in Nova Kakhovka. Ukraine continued to strike Russian targets and approach towards Kherson over the next week.

=== Preparation phase and initial offensive announcements ===
In July, Ukrainian command planned out the Kherson counteroffensive with American and British officers in Germany. At the time, the Ukrainians were considering a much broader offensive across the entire southern front which would include reaching the coast of the Azov Sea via the city of Melitopol in Zaporizhzhia Oblast, in order to cut the so-called "land bridge" between Crimea and mainland Russia. This was reportedly the preferred option of Ukrainian commander-in-chief Zaluzhnyi and British command. However, the Americans and the British ran computer simulations which demonstrated that Ukrainians had insufficient manpower and resources to accomplish the objectives of such an operation.

The Ukrainians settled on a more limited operation focused on retaking the city of Kherson. The operation would eliminate the threat of the Russian bridgehead on the west bank of the Dnieper River being used to facilitate future advances on Odesa and Kyiv.

Major General Andrii Kovalchuk was made the initial commander for the counteroffensive in the south. He initially drew up plans which aimed to bisect the Russian-held area on the west bank of the Dnieper and trap the 25,000-strong Russian contingent, preventing it from retreating across the river. Kovalchuk considered launching HIMARS missiles at the Kakhovka Dam in order to flood the river and prevent Russian crossings; this option was considered a "last resort".

The allies agreed that the offensive on Kherson would be coupled with a simultaneous offensive in Kharkiv Oblast. American general Chris Donahue had recommended that the fronts be "coequal", but the Ukrainians preferred that the Kharkiv operation be a smaller supporting feint, in order to draw Russian forces from Kherson to the east.

The starting dates of these offensives were scheduled for around 4 September in Kharkiv and around 18 September in Kherson, after two weeks of artillery bombardment. Plans were drawn up for Ukrainian forces to cross the Dnieper and advance to Crimea if they retained sufficient ammunition after taking Kherson. Ukrainian president Zelenskyy later arranged for the operation in Kherson to instead be launched first, on 29 August, in the hopes that it would produce a victory by the time of his mid-September appearance before the United Nations General Assembly, which he could then use to make a case for increased military aid. Donahue warned Zaluzhnyi that the switch would put the counteroffensive in jeopardy; however, the Russians responded by moving reinforcements from the east to the south, allowing the Ukrainians to advance far further in Kharkiv than expected.

According to a 24 July statement by Kherson Region official Serhii Khlan, Ukrainian attacks damaging Antonivka Road Bridge and another key bridge, and attacks on Russian ammunition stores and command posts, were preparatory actions for the offensive. A day earlier, Khlan stated that Ukrainian forces had retaken several villages in Kherson Oblast, but that the Ukrainian authorities requested civilians not to publish information on the progress of the campaign prior to official statements. On 26 July, Antonivka Road Bridge was hit again by a Ukrainian HIMARS missile strike. The bridge remained structurally intact while the bridge's roadway surface was damaged.

On 27 July 2022, Ukrainian forces stated that they had retaken control of the villages of Lozove and Andriivka, both on the eastern side of the Inhulets river, in Beryslav Raion in Kherson Oblast. In the next months, Ukrainian forces launched a series of limited ground attacks as well as several air and rocket attacks on Russian targets in southern Ukraine. On 9 August, explosions heavily damaged the Russian airbase at Novofedorivka, Crimea. An anonymous Western official stated that the explosions, possibly caused by a Ukrainian attack, had "put more than half of [the Russian] Black Sea fleet's naval aviation combat jets out of use".

Though these Ukrainian attacks were met with some success, they did not cripple Russian defenses in the south or achieve a breakthrough. On 10 August, an unnamed Ukrainian military official told Politico that the counteroffensive had begun in earnest on 9 August. However, Al Jazeera argued that both sides had seemingly fought each other to a standstill, with a major Ukrainian offensive not materializing.

=== Preceding Russian offensive in the south ===
On 20 August, Russian forces launched a minor offensive in southern Ukraine, with Ukrainian sources admitting that Russian forces had advanced and made gains in the towns of Blahodatne and Vasylky in Mykolaiv Oblast. On August 22, Russian forces achieved some success east of the city of Mykolaiv and in northwestern Kherson Oblast, driving Ukrainian forces 36 km from the front line to the north and 28 km deep into the territory of Mykolaiv Oblast with two objectives, to force a westward direction towards the city Mykolaiv or in a northerly direction towards the Dnipropetrovsk Oblast with the intention of capturing the city of Kryvyi Rih, which hosts a strong Ukrainian troop concentration, and from where a counter-offensive on Kherson, Melitopol, Enerhodar, Berdyansk and Crimea is planned. On the same day, Russian forces took control of Blahodatne about 45 km east of the town of Mykolaiv and a 12 square kilometer zone of control.

On August 23, the Russian Ministry of Defense announced that Russian forces had advanced northwest of Oleksandrivka, approximately 38 km west of the city of Kherson, and had reached the administrative border of Kherson–Mykolaiv Oblast. Ukrainian troops retaliated with artillery strikes on the site of the Russian 247th Airborne Regiment of the 7th Guards Air Assault Division and the ammunition depot in Chornobaivka. The same day, Russian forces continued air and artillery strikes on Dnipropetrovsk, Kryvyi Rih, and Mykolaiv with Uragan rockets.

From 24 to 25 August, the Russian forces continued their attacks but made no further progress. On 27 August, Russian and Ukrainian forces clashed at Potomkyne in northwestern Kherson Oblast; both sides claimed that they had repelled an attack. Meanwhile, Russia and Ukraine continued to conduct air strikes in the area, with Ukraine's Southern Operational Command claiming successful hits on three river crossings (Antonivka and Darivka bridges, and the Kakhovka Hydroelectric Power Plant) and two Russian battalion tactical groups.

The Institute for the Study of War has credited the Ukrainian southern offensive with allowing the Kharkiv offensive to be so successful. Writing: "Kyiv's long discussion and then an announcement of a counter-offensive operation aimed at Kherson Oblast drew substantial Russian troops away from the sectors on which Ukrainian forces have conducted decisive attacks in the past several days".

== Counteroffensive ==
=== August ===
On 29 August, Zelenskyy announced the start of a full-scale counteroffensive to retake Russian-occupied territory in the south, a claim that was corroborated by the Ukrainian parliament as well as Operational Command South.

At the start of the operation, the Ukrainian operational group "Kakhovka" and some Ukrainian officials claimed that their forces had broken through defensive lines manned by the 109th DPR Regiment and Russian paratroopers. The 109th DPR Regiment was a conscript unit which was known to serve on garrison duty in the Kherson area. Ukrainian officials also claimed that they had hit and destroyed a large Russian base in the area amid a general increase of Ukrainian air and artillery bombardments of Russian positions. The authorities in occupied Kherson called these claims "fake" and "an illusion", but also announced a workplace evacuation from Nova Kakhova following Ukrainian missile strikes. Locals reported heavy fighting across the Kherson frontline, while electrical networks temporarily failed and evacuations of civilians took place. An NPR journalist in the area confirmed the increased intensity of combat and that more Ukrainian forces were moving to the frontline. The Ukrainian government and military largely refused to talk about territorial changes on the offensive's first day, though anonymous Ukrainian officials, Western journalists and a number of Russian milbloggers reported that Ukrainian troops had captured several settlements north and northwest of Kherson, at a bridgehead across the Inhulets River, as well as south of the Kherson–Dnipropetrovsk Oblast border. Among these were the villages of Sukhyi Stavok, Novodmytrivka, (Note: It is not known if this refers to the village of Novodmytrivka in Beryslav Raion, Kherson Oblast, or to Novodymitrivka in Kherson Raion, Kherson Oblast; both villages were at the frontline at the time.) Arkhanhelske, Tomyna Balka and Pravdyne. The Ukrainians also attacked Russian pontoon ferries on the Dnipro River.

By 30 August, Russia was beginning to direct large numbers of troops and equipment to the Kherson frontline to counter the Ukrainian offensive. Meanwhile, Ukraine intensified its attacks on Russian concentration points, ammunition depots, bridges and other targets. In Kherson city, there were reports of fighting between Ukrainian partisans and pro-Russian security forces. Russian milbloggers claimed that battles were ongoing at Myrne, Soldatske and Snihurivka, Ukraine had retaken Ternovi Pody, but been repelled at Pravdyne and Oleksandrivka. According to Pantelis Boubouras, Greece's honorary consul in Kherson, the Ukrainians had relatively easily broken the Russian first line of defense near Kherson city, but had encountered much stiffer resistance at the Russian second line of defense in the area. By 31 August, this second line was the main focus of combat, with Boubouras stating that local sources had informed that both sides were suffering heavy losses. However, a Russian milblogger reported that Ukrainians were making progress toward Vysokopillia further north, though the overall situation at the northern frontline remained unclear. Milbloggers also claimed that the Russians had been able to stabilize the frontline at Oleksandrivka as well as Blahodatne, but had failed when attempting to retake Myrne. Ukrainian advances were also reported at Ternovi Pody and Lyubomyrivka. Later that day, Ukrainian sources claimed that four small villages had already been retaken, though Ukrainian soldiers also stated their opinion that this operation was not a large counteroffensive but rather a localized operation. Ukrainian Presidential Advisor Oleksiy Arestovych cautioned that the offensive was going to be a "slow operation to grind the enemy", not a quick and massive campaign.

=== September ===
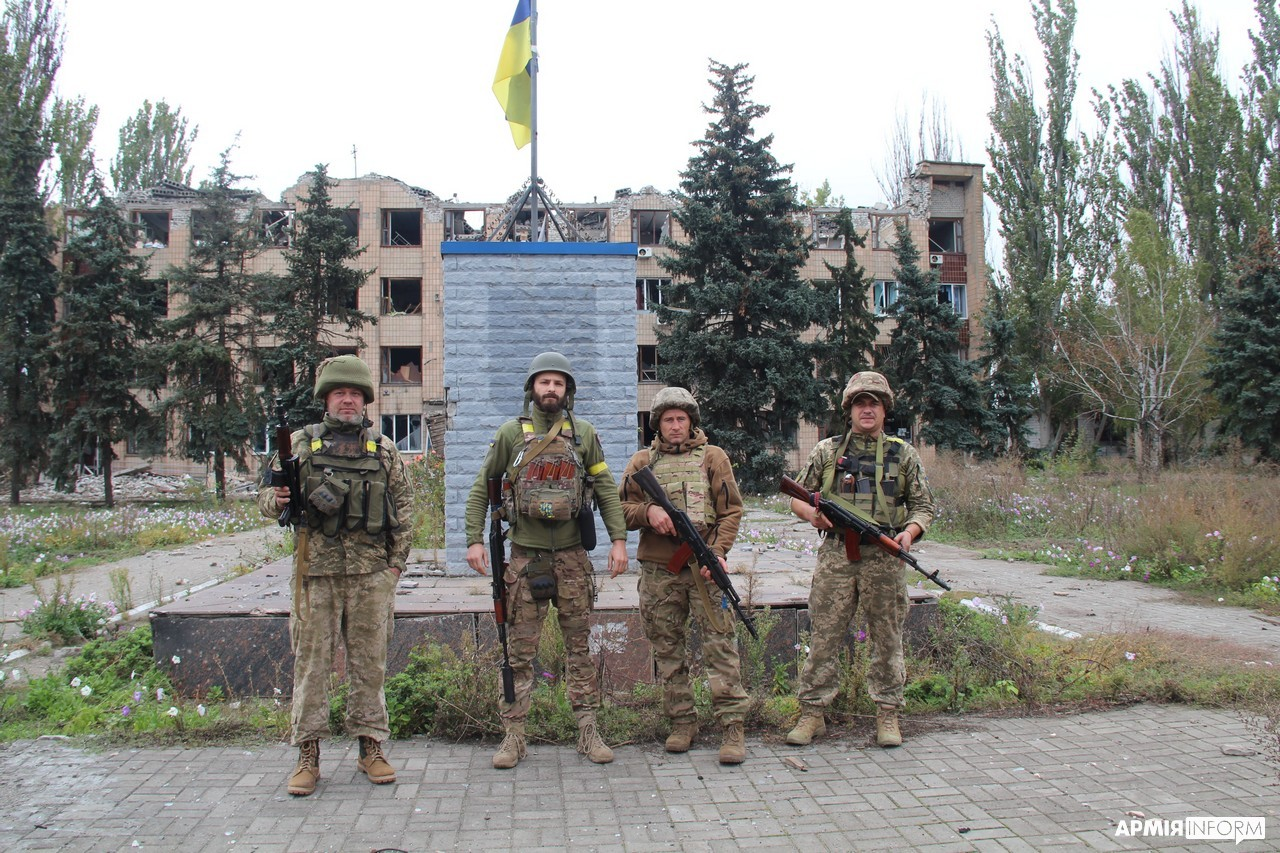
Ukrainian forces in Vysokopillia, Kherson Oblast, 27 September 2022

From 1 to 2 September, Russian milbloggers reported further Ukrainian advances, but also a series of successful Russian counter-attacks. Many villages were reportedly contested. On 2 September, a day of mourning was declared by Ukrainian authorities in Zakarpattia Oblast, after the heavy losses suffered by the native 128th Mountain Assault Brigade during the opening days of the offensive. On 3 September, the British Ministry of Defence said that Ukrainian forces had made three main lines of attack in Kherson Oblast, and had a military advantage of tactical surprise as a result of Russian commanders' mistakes and Russian logistical problems. Ukrainian forces destroyed Russian pontoon bridges. There was gunfire near the centre of Kherson city.

Also on 3 September, Russian milbloggers claimed that Ukrainian troops had captured the village of Blahodativka and withdrawn from a few positions near Sukhyi Stavok. In early September, elements of the 35th Marine Brigade crossed a small river and reached the village of Bruskynske, attempting to advance southward as part of General Andrii Kovalchuk's plan to bisect the Russian-held area on the west bank. At Bruskynske, the Russians had constructed a second line of defense. The Ukrainian unit suffered losses in personnel and vehicles spending several weeks fighting in the area.

On 4 September, president Zelenskyy announced the liberation of two villages in Kherson Oblast. Ukrainian authorities released a photo showing the raising of the Ukrainian flag in Vysokopillia by Ukrainian forces. On 5 September, the Ukrainians claimed to have killed 30 Russian soldiers and destroyed 3 tanks in a strike against Kherson city; an anti-aircraft missile system and six trucks were also claimed to have been hit near the Antonivka Bridge.

On 6 September, Ukraine started a second offensive in the Kharkiv area, where it achieved a rapid breakthrough. Meanwhile, Ukrainian attacks also continued along the southern frontline, though reports about territorial changes were largely unverifiable.

On 9 September, the Ukrainians claimed that the Russian 247th Guards Air Assault Regiment, composed of 1,500 soldiers, no longer existed, with their troops either being killed or wounded. Documents later captured during the liberation of Kherson in November revealed that the overwhelming majority of these losses were deaths.

On 12 September, President Zelenskyy said that Ukrainian forces have retaken a total of 6,000 km^{2} from Russia, in both the south and the east. The BBC stated that it could not verify these claims. Also on that day, the Ukrainians claimed that the 2,500-strong Russian 810th Guards Naval Infantry Brigade had suffered more than 85 percent casualties during the offensive, and that the remaining 15 percent had refused to fight.

On 13 September, that Russian forces had withdrawn from Kyselivka, a settlement 15 km from Kherson. On the same day, the Russia-backed deputy head of the Kherson Region posted a video from the outskirts of the settlement in which he claimed that Ukrainian troops have not been able to enter it. The mayor of Melitopol reported that Russian forces were abandoning the city and were moving to Russian-held Crimea. Arestovych claimed that Ukrainian forces had retaken Oleksandrivka on 13 September. A local official claimed that Ukraine had retaken Kyselivka, but this was unable to be confirmed by September 14. In order to slow down the Ukrainian advance, Russian forces blew up a dam at the Inhulets river, flooding parts of the frontline.

By 24 September, U.S. officials assessed that the Russian situation at the Kherson frontline was deteriorating, with the local troops suffering from poor morale and largely cut off from supply lines due to the loss of bridges across the Dnipro River. Russian military commanders had reportedly requested to retreat to more defensible positions, but President Putin had intervened and forbidden any retreat which would give up Kherson city.

On 27 September, Ukrainian officials claimed that a phone intercept from Kherson revealed that an unidentified Russian regiment was reduced from 2,000 soldiers to 50.

=== October ===
Ukrainian forces took Khreshchenivka in northern Kherson Oblast on 1 October. On the same day, after Ukrainian forces penetrated Russian defenses at Zolota Balka, Russian forces withdrew to defensive positions in Mykhailivka 8 kilometres (5.0 mi) south. The next day, according to the Institute for the Study of War, the Russians likely fell further back to Dudchany, representing a withdrawal of 24 kilometres (15 mi) to the south in total.

By 2 October, the Ukrainian gains in northern Kherson oblast had developed into "significant breakthroughs", according to the Institute for the Study of War. Ukrainian forces started a counteroffensive along the line from Arkhanhelske to Osokorivka in the Kherson region south of the Kherson–Dnipropetrovsk border. They moved south along the west bank of the Dnieper and retook Zolota Balka as well as Mykhailivka and advanced further south to the next target, Dudchany. Ukrainian president Volodymyr Zelenskyy announced that Ukrainian forces liberated Myrolyubivka (Beryslav Raion) and Arkhanhelske on the Inhulets River south of the Kherson–Dnipropetrovsk Oblast border. The installed Russian head of the Kherson region, Vladimir Saldo, said that "in that region there was a breakthrough" and called the situation "tense". The offensive was led by a battalion of Ukraine's 128th Mountain Assault Brigade and a battalion of Ukraine's 60th Mechanized Brigade. Ukraine's 35th Marine Brigade captured Davydiv Brid by 4 October, after two Ukrainian assaults on the settlement were repelled over the previous two days, according to the Russian defense ministry.

By 3 October, the Russian army was being enveloped in northern Kherson Oblast, with Ukrainian troops trying to reach Beryslav. Ukrainian forces continued to advance south in the direction of Nova Kakhovka, and geolocated footage showed that they liberated Mykhailivka, Novooleksandrivka and Havrylivka along the T0403 road. Russian sources also reported that Ukrainian forces liberated settlements on the Lyubomyrivka–Biliaivka–Novoolesandrivka line. The offensive continued southwards with towns of Davydiv Brid, Velyka Oleksandrivka and Dudchany reported as liberated 4 October. On 5 October, the pro-Russian deputy head of the Kherson region, Kirill Stremousov, stated that Russian forces were "regrouping" in order to "strike back" at Ukrainian troops; he added that the Ukrainian advance had been "halted" and therefore it was "not possible" for the AFU to break through to the city of Kherson. The same day, Russian officers were reported as withdrawing from Snihurivka while some troops remained. The Ukrainian side was seeking confirmation.

By 4 October, as confirmed by Institute for the Study of War (ISW), several Russian and Ukrainian sources reported that Ukrainian forces captured Davydiv Brid, Mala Oleksandrivka, Velyka Oleksandrivka, Novodmytrivka, Starosillia, Dudchany on the shore of the Kakhovka Reservoir, Chereshneve, Novovoskresenske, Maiske, Petropavlivka, Tryfonivka, Novovasylivka, Chervone, Novohryhorivka, Nova Kamianka, Piatykhatky, Sablukivka, Kachkarivka, and Novopetrivka after Russian forces abandoned them to avoid encirclement on 4 October. A total area of 2,400 square kilometers in the south of Ukraine had been liberated since the beginning of the war. Also on 4 October, the Ukrainians had claimed to have "degraded, if not destroyed" the 2,000 troop-strong 126th Coastal Defence Brigade, which they had routed two days earlier. Later, on 13 October, personnel from the brigade asserted that they had been "crushed" by the Ukrainians, and complained that they had one BTR for 80 people, which had restricted their mobility.

On 13 October, the Russian government announced evacuation of the civilian population in the city of Kherson, after a request by the Russia-installed head of Kherson Oblast Volodymyr Saldo.

On 15 October, a major Ukrainian counteroffensive resumed on the northern Kherson front in the direction of Dudchany, Mylove and Sukhanove. On 18 October, General Sergei Surovikin, the new commander of Russian forces in Ukraine, said in Russian TV that the defence of Kherson was "not easy" and that “The enemy continually attempts to attack the positions of Russian troops.” Michael Clarke projected that the Ukrainians were engaged in a Suppression of Enemy Air Defenses (SEAD) operation over Kherson Oblast.

On 22 October Russian occupation authorities urged residents in the city of Kherson to "leave immediately" citing what they called the tense military situation.

In late October 2022, Ramzan Kadyrov acknowledged the deaths of 23 Kadyrovites and the injury of 58 others in a rare announcement acknowledging casualties. He announced that they had been killed in Kherson by Ukrainian artillery attacks in the region. In late October, Ukrainian Chief of Intelligence Maj. Gen. Kyrylo Budanov said that at least 40,000 Russian forces were present on Kherson including naval infantry, special forces and VDV airborne troops.

During October, Kovalchuk was dismissed from his role as commander of the counteroffensive and replaced by Brigadier General Oleksandr Tarnavskyi, because the sentiment among the command in Kyiv was that the operation was not moving quickly enough. The change was not publicly announced at the time to avoid giving Russia a propaganda victory. It has been reported that Ben Wallace, the British defence secretary at the time, ordered Kovalchuk's dismissal, though Wallace has denied this. American general Chris Donahue had reportedly "pleaded" with Kovalchuk to resume the advance in Kherson to no avail, and American generals Christopher G. Cavoli and Mark Milley raised the issue with Zaluzhnyi before Kovalchuk's eventual dismissal.

=== November ===
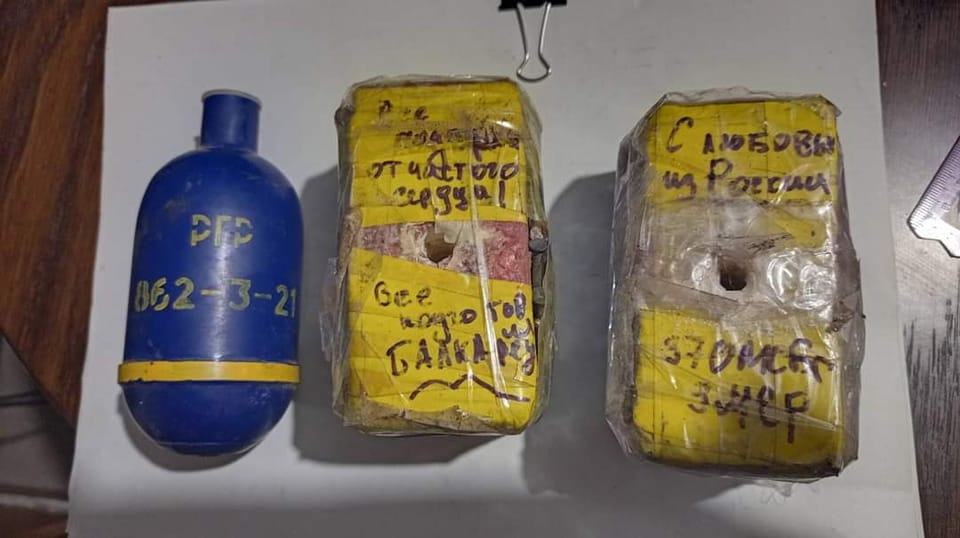
Russian landmines placed during Ukraine's advance, reading "from a pure heart" and "with love from Russia"

In early November, Russian forces began retreating from Kherson.

On 9 November, Ukrainian forces were close to entering Snihurivka; Russia announced the withdrawal of its troops from Kherson and the right bank of the Dnieper.

On 10 November, a video emerged appearing to show the Ukrainian flag flying in Snihurivka; it was reported that Ukraine's 131st Reconnaissance Battalion had taken control over the city. Ukraine's 28th Mechanized Brigade had also reportedly regained control of Kyselivka, fifteen kilometers northwest of Kherson. On the same day, Commander-in-Chief of the Armed Forces of Ukraine Valerii Zaluzhnyi stated that Ukrainian forces had taken back 41 settlements in the Kherson direction since 1 October.

On 11 November, Ukrainian troops entered the city of Kherson. The troops were met by crowds chanting "Slava Ukraini!" and "ZSU!" (Zbroini syly Ukrainy, Armed Forces of Ukraine). With the recapture of Kherson, the Ukrainian offensive culminated without Ukrainian forces attempting a crossing of the Dnieper River, as they had run short on ammunition.

== Aftermath ==
After the recapture of Kherson, Ukraine continued offensive military operations in the area. On 12 November, a video allegedly showed Ukrainian special forces crossing the Dnieper–Bug estuary in speedboats and attacking Russian forces stationed on the Kinburn Peninsula. On the same day, the Russian occupation authorities announced that they were preparing to leave the town of Nova Kakhovka, located on the east bank of the Dnieper River. The following day, Russian media reported that 20 Ukrainian "saboteurs" from the country's armed forces and four vessels had been destroyed in an attempt to land in Pokrovske on the Kinburn Peninsula.

On 13 November, the administration of the Kherson Oblast called on Kherson residents and residents of other recently liberated areas on the right bank of the Dnieper to evacuate to safer parts of the country due to fears that Russian forces could "begin fighting against the civilian population". During Zelenskyy's speech in Kherson on 14 November, the NOS described the situation on the ground as "a sort of unspoken ceasefire", and that "both belligerents had taken a kind of break and were not extensively shooting at each other". Russian forces were still close by on the eastern river bank, and Kherson city continued to face medicine shortages, and heavily damaged communications, water supply, heating and electricity networks.

According to Ukraine’s Operational Command South, on 15 November Ukrainian rocket and artillery units attacked Russian positions on the left bank of the Dnieper River and in the area of the Kinburn Spit.

Throughout the course of Ukraine's counteroffensive, they had liberated the island of Ostriv Velykyi Potomkin in November. On 9 December, some Ukrainian officials, including presidential advisor Oleksii Arestovych and Lieutenant Colonel Konstiantyn Mashovets, and some unofficial Russian sources, claimed that Russian forces, specifically the 80th Arctic Motor Rifle Brigade, 25th Spetsnaz Regiment, and 4th BARS Special Combat Army Reserve, had re-occupied the island following a successful amphibious operation. However, this was contested by Serhii Khlan, advisor to the governor of Kherson, who stated that Russia did not have any presence on the island. Contradicting Khlan, the General Staff of the Ukrainian Armed Forces claimed on 15 December that Russia had begun forcibly deporting civilians from Ostriv Velykyi Potomkin, indicating that Russian forces controlled the island.

== Analysis ==
On 10 September 2022, Taras Berezovets stated that the southern counteroffensive had been part of a "disinformation campaign" to distract Russia from the real counteroffensive being prepared in the Kharkiv oblast. The Institute for the Study of War analyzed that Russian forces began moving equipment from the eastern frontlines to those in the south in order to prepare for the impending counteroffensive. Thus, Russian frontlines in Kharkiv oblast were left relatively unprotected to Ukrainian advances.

On 24 September 2022, The New York Times reported that Ukrainian commanders and servicemen acknowledged suffering heavy losses during the Kherson offensive, mostly caused by lack of ammunition, strong Russian defenses and the role of Russian artillery. Casualties in one Ukrainian battalion were so high its units' members were replaced three times. Ukrainian colonel Vadym Sukharevsky credited part of Ukraine's victory in Kherson to the artillery systems, guided munitions and long-range rocket launchers sent by Western partner countries for an article by The Washington Post.

Following the liberation of Kherson, the Institute for the Study of War argued that "Russia's withdrawal from Kherson City is igniting an ideological fracture between pro-war figures and Russian President Vladimir Putin, eroding confidence in Putin's commitment and ability to deliver his war promises", noting criticism toward the Russian government from nationalist figures such as Aleksandr Dugin, Igor "Strelkov" Girkin and the Wagner Group; the ISW also noted how "Russian military leadership is trying and largely failing to integrate combat forces drawn from many different organizations and of many different types and levels of skill and equipment into a more cohesive fighting force in Ukraine", especially noting the lack of organization of military forces coming from Donetsk People's Republic and Luhansk People's Republic.

== See also ==
- 2022 Kharkiv counteroffensive
- Crimea attacks (2022–present)
- 2023 Ukrainian counteroffensive
- Battle of Kherson
- Capture of Melitopol
- Battle of Mykolaiv
- Liberation of Kherson
- Russian occupation of Kherson Oblast
- Russian occupation of Mykolaiv Oblast
- Russian occupation of Zaporizhzhia Oblast
- List of invasions in the 21st century
