= 60th Mechanized Brigade =

Ukrainian Ground Forces unit

- 60-та окрема механізована Інгулецька бригада
- Founded: 18 July 2016
- Country: Ukraine
- Branch: Ukrainian Ground Forces
- Role: Mechanized Infantry
- Size: Brigade
- Part of: 3rd Army Corps
- Engagements: Russo-Ukrainian War: Southern front; 2022 Kherson counteroffensive; Eastern front; Battle of Bakhmut; Kupiansk front

Commanders
- Notable commanders: Col. Andrii Borodin

Insignia
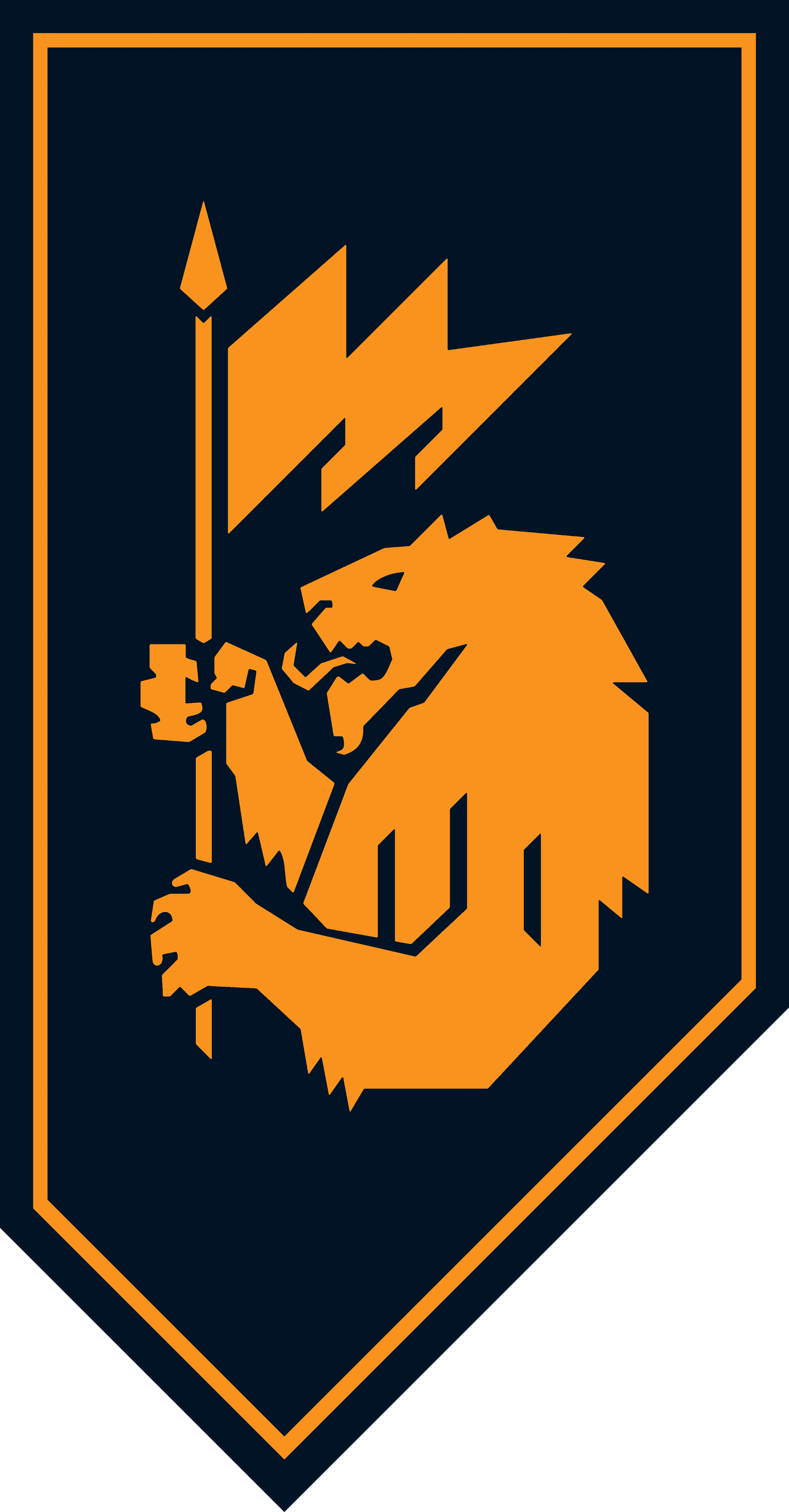
- Flag

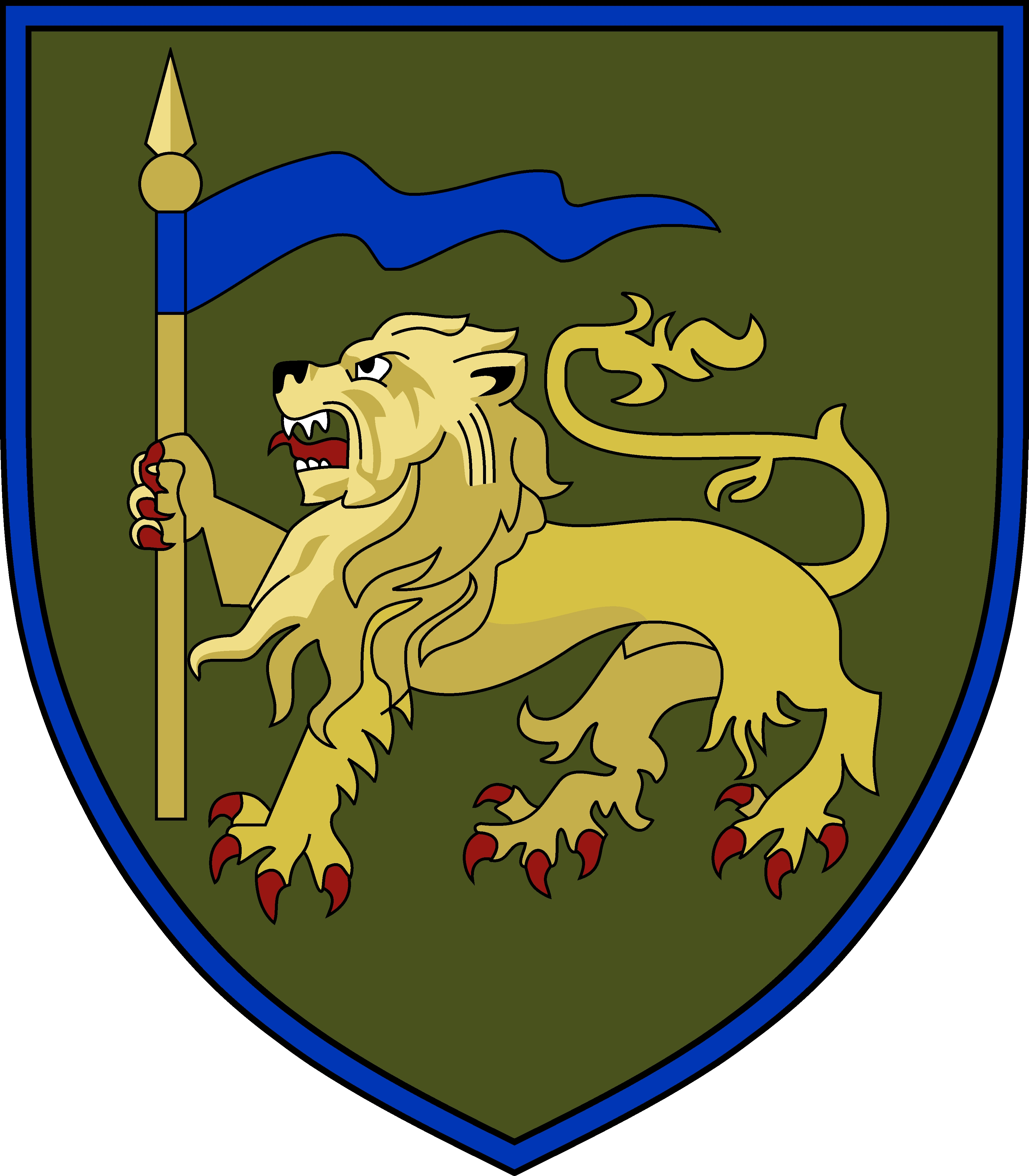
- Insignia (2022 – January 2026)

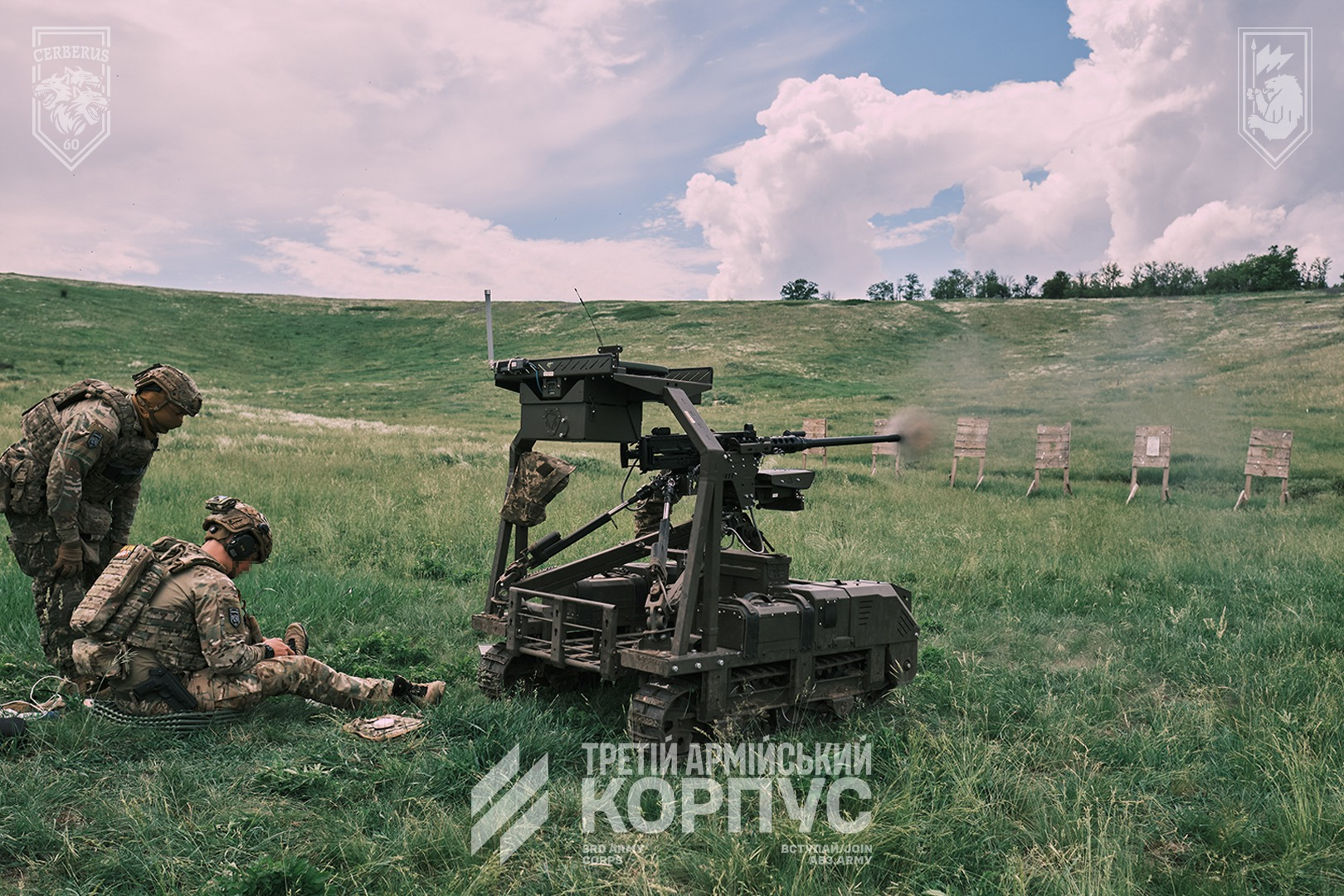
UGV operators of the brigade training at the firing range

The Separate 60th Mechanized "Inhulets" Brigade (Ukrainian: 60-та окрема механізована Інгулецька бригада) is a brigade of the Ukrainian Ground Forces.

== History ==
=== War in Donbas ===
The brigade was formed on 18 July 2016.

=== Russia-Ukraine war ===
==== Operations in southern Ukraine (2022) ====
At the beginning of the Russia-Ukraine war, the brigade took up the defense of the Dnipropetrovsk Oblast and later advanced into the Kherson Oblast. Early into the Russian invasion, the brigade was based near the city of Kryvyi Rih in the Dnipropetrovsk region. At this period in time, it was described by Ukrainian military journalist Yurii Butusov as "people literally from the street" with no training, organization, or heavy weapons.

On the night of 10-11 March 2022, in the village of Orlove, Kherson Oblast, Russian reconnaissance units killed a member of the 60th Brigade and captured two others, later killing them in the village of Mariine. During the day on 11 March, an additional five soldiers of the 60th Brigade were killed in combat near Orlove, but the Ukrainian forces reportedly managed to stop the advance of a Russian column.

During mid-March 2022, units of the brigade were positioned on the border of Kherson Oblast and Dnipropetrovsk Oblast. A member of the brigade's 7th Infantry Company was killed by artillery fire near Novovorontsovka on 12 March, and another soldier was killed in Koshove, Dnipropetrovsk Oblast, on 14 March.

By the end of March 2022, it was announced that the brigade, alongside the 4th Battalion of the 17th Tank Brigade, had taken part in the recapture of eleven settlements in the northern portion of the Kherson Oblast, including Orlove and Novovorontsovka.

On 30 June 2022, the Ukrainian military announced that elements of the 60th Brigade had conducted a successful offensive near the village of Pot'omkyne, restoring Ukrainian control over the settlement. Units of the brigade continued to operate near Pot'omkyne in July 2022. On 11 July 2022, the 60th Brigade announced that its forces had captured the village of Ivanivka.

A battalion of the 60th Brigade, along with a battalion from Ukraine's 128th Brigade, conducted an offensive operation in October 2022 towards the villages of Zolota Balka, Dudchany, and Mylove, forcing Russian troops to retreat from parts of the Kherson Oblast west of the Dnieper River . At the time, it was reported that the brigade had not had a break from combat since the beginning of the war, causing fatigue in its ranks.

==== Operations in Bakhmut (2022-2023) ====
The brigade's name was redesignated from the 60th Infantry Brigade to the 60th Mechanized Brigade on 6 December 2022.

The brigade took part in the Battle of Bakhmut from late 2022 to 2023.

==== Operations in the Kharkiv region (2023-2024) ====
In the summer of 2023, the brigade was positioned on the Russia–Ukraine border in the Kharkiv Oblast.

In late 2023 and early 2024, the brigade took part in the defense of Kupiansk.

==== Lyman front (2024–present) ====
The 60th Brigade was transferred from the Kupiansk front to the Lyman front no later than March 2024. That month, it was reported that the brigade's were operating near the village of Yampolivka in the Donetsk Oblast.

The 60th Brigade continued to operate on the Lyman front in June 2024.

In October 2024, it was reported that the 60th Brigade was active in combat near the village of Torske. The next month, it was reported that units of the brigade were defending Terny amid frequent Russian attempts to capture the village. The 60th remained active on the Lyman front in December 2024, and the next month, its mechanized units were reportedly operating in the village of Ivanivka.

On 26 February 2025, the brigade was awarded the honorary award "For Courage and Bravery".

The 60th Brigade was the first brigade to be integrated into the 3rd Army Corps. All of its personnel, including senior commanders, were sent for retraining.

== Structure ==
As of 2024, the brigade's structure is as follows:

- 60th Mechanized Brigade,
  - Brigade's Headquarters
  - 96th Mechanized Battalion
  - 97th Mechanized Battalion
    - FPV Drone Company "Dragons 97"
  - 98th Mechanized Battalion
  - 19th Separate Rifle Battalion (A7103)
    - Tank Battalion
    - Field Artillery Regiment
    - Headquarters & Target Acquisition Battery
      - UAV Unit "Spear"
    - 1st Self-Propelled Artillery Battalion
    - 2nd Self-Propelled Artillery Battalion
    - Rocket Artillery Unit
    - Anti-Tank Unit
  - Anti-Aircraft Defense Battalion
  - Reconnaissance Company
  - FPV Drone Company "Vidar"
  - Engineer Battalion
  - Maintenance Battalion
  - Logistic Battalion
  - Signal Company
  - Radar Company
  - Medical Company
  - Chemical, Biological, Radiological and Nuclear Defense Company
