= 128th Mountain Assault Brigade =

Ukrainian Ground Forces unit

128th Mountain Assault Brigade (2018–present) 128th Mountain Brigade (2016–2018) 128th Guards Mountain Brigade (2013–2016) 128th Guards Mechanized Brigade (2004–2013) 128th Guards Mechanized Division (1992–2004) 128th Guards Motor Rifle Division (1957–1991) 128th Guards Mountain Rifle Division (1943–1957) 83rd Mountain Rifle Division (1935–1943) 1st Turkmenistan Rifle Division (1922–1935)
- Ukrainian: 128-ма окрема гвардійська гірсько-штурмова Закарпатська бригада
- 128th Mountain Brigade shoulder sleeve patch
- Active: 12 July 1922 – present
- Country: Soviet Union (Jul 1922 – Jan 1992); Ukraine (Jan 1992 – present)
- Branch: Ukrainian Ground Forces
- Type: Assault Infantry
- Role: Mountain Warfare
- Size: Brigade
- Part of: Operational Command West
- Garrison/HQ: Mukachevo; MUN А1778
- Mottos: "For Ukraine, for her freedom."
- Anniversaries: July 12
- Engagements: World War II; Operation Whirlwind; Operation Danube; War in Donbas; Battle of Debaltsevo; Russian invasion of Ukraine; Battle of Melitopol; First Battle of Kreminna; 2022 Kherson counteroffensive; Battle of Soledar; Battle of Bakhmut; 2023 Ukrainian counteroffensive
- Decorations: Order of the Red Banner (2) (removed) For Courage and Bravery
- Battle honours: Guards (removed); Turkestan (removed); Zakarpattia

Commanders
- Current commander: Colonel Dmytro Lysyuk
- Notable commanders: Serhiy Tumoshkov (1st Commander)

Insignia
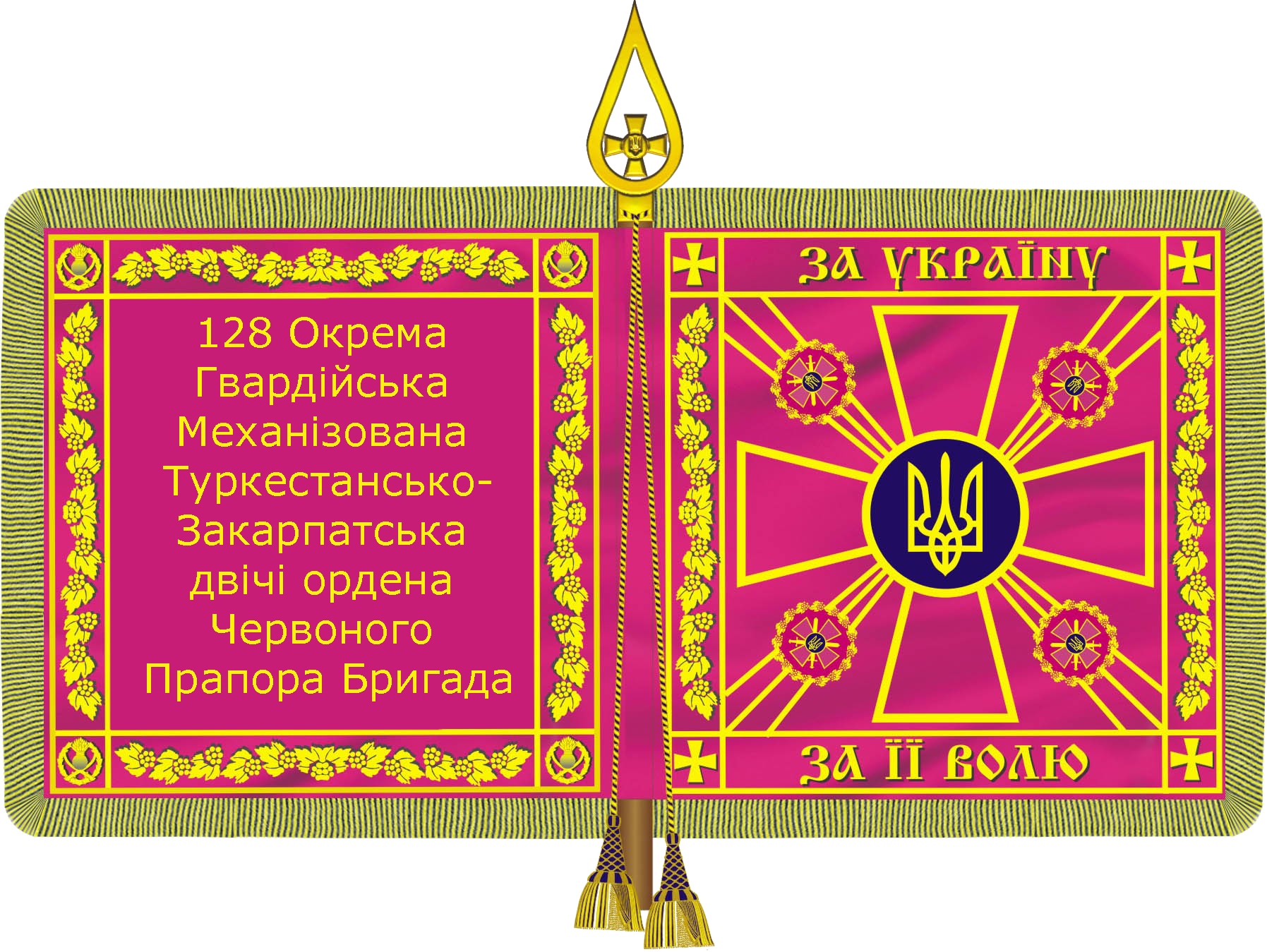
- Banner of the Brigade (before 2013)

The 128th Mountain Assault Brigade is a formation of the Ukrainian Ground Forces.

The full title of the brigade is 128th Mountain Assault Brigade "Zakarpattia", (Ukrainian: 128-ма окрема гірсько-штурмова Закарпатська бригада). It is the second oldest serving formation of the UGF, being raised in 1922. It participated in the invasions of Hungary and Czechoslovakia by Soviet troops.

== History ==
=== Red Army ===
The 128th Mechanized Division was first formed within the then USSR's Red Army as the 1st Turkmenistan Rifle Division on 12 July 1922 in the city of Poltoratsk (now Ashgabat, Turkmenistan). (Other sources give the original name as the 1st Turkmenistan Mountain Division). It was a Turkmen national formation. Serhiy Tumoshkov became the division's first commander. The division was renamed 83rd Mountain Rifle Division on 1 July 1935. On 22 June 1941 the 83rd Mountain Rifle Division was part of the 58th Rifle Corps, Central Asia Military District. Between 1 September and 1 October 1941, the division was assigned to the 53rd Army, still located within the Central Asia Military District. By January 1942 the division, still with 58th Rifle Corps, had been dispatched to Iran as part of the Anglo-Soviet invasion of Iran.

From 1 January 1943 the division fought near the area of Krasnodar where it was assigned to the 56th Army. After successfully liberating the region of Kuban and the Taman Peninsula, the division was awarded the Guards designation on 8 October 1943 and renamed the 128th Guards Turkmenistan Rifle Division.

On 24 April 1944, for participation in the battles for Crimea, the division was awarded its first Order of the Red Banner. During the month of August, the division participated in battles for the Carpathian Mountains. The division captured Northeast Hungary, what later became Zakarpattya in the Soviet Union, and on 12 October 1944 crossed the border with Czechoslovakia. Units of the division occupied Ostrava, Olomouc and other cities.

Postwar, the division was stationed in Mukacheve and became part of the 38th Army. During October and November 1956, it took part in Operation Whirlwind, the crushing of the Hungarian Revolution of 1956. The division captured Debrecen and Szolnok and Jászberény. Advancing westward, it participated in the storming of Budapest. On 15 December 1956, the division became the 128th Guards Motor Rifle Division at Esztergom. In July 1958, the division was moved back to Mukacheve. In 1968, the division participated in Operation Danube, the Soviet invasion of Czechoslovakia. During the operation, eleven soldiers of the division were killed. In May 1976, it was granted the honorific title "Marshal of the Soviet Union Andriy Hrechko". In December 1979, its 149th Guards Motor Rifle Regiment was transferred to the 201st Motor Rifle Division and replaced by the newly activated 487th Motor Rifle Regiment. On 8 May 1985 the division was awarded its second Order of the Red Banner in honour of the 40th anniversary of Victory Day.

=== Independent Ukraine ===
In January 1992, the division was taken over by Ukraine. On 31 December 1992, in Decree 642/92, the President of Ukraine promoted the commander of the 128th Guards Motor Rifle Division of the Carpathian Military District, Colonel Vyacheslav Zabolotny, to Major-General.

In accordance with a decree of 23 August 1998, Colonel Oleksandr Maslenchuk – commander of the 128th Mechanised Division of the 38th Army Corps of the Operational Command West; was promoted to major-general.

On 27 May 2000 the Minister of Defense, General of the Army Oleksandr Kuzmuk presented the division its new Battle Colours, and read the Order of the President of Ukraine awarding the division the honorable name "Zakarpattia".

Until 2002, the division was under the command of the 38th Army Corps. After the 38th Army Corps was disbanded, the division became part of the 13th Corps.

On 18 June 2004 the 128th Guards Motor Rifle Division was reorganized into a brigade by the order of the Minister of Defense.

In 2013, the brigade became the 128th Mountain Brigade.

In 2014–15 the brigade fought in the war in Donbas, taking part in the Battle of Debaltseve. For his leadership in the Battle of Debaltseve, brigade commander Colonel Serhiy Shaptala was awarded the title Hero of Ukraine.

The brigade has a training ground near the city of Vynohradiv.

On 18 November 2015, the brigade's honorifics "Turkestan twice Red Banner" were removed as part of an Armed Forces-wide removal of Soviet awards and honorifics. The "Zakarpattia" battle honor, awarded for the liberation of the area in 1945, remained. On 22 August 2016, its Guards title was also removed.

=== Russian invasion of Ukraine ===
A base belonging to the 128th Brigade was bombarded as part of the initial Russian strikes on military targets on 24 February 2022. The brigade abandoned its base and was deployed to the vicinity of Melitopol. It was eventually pushed 70 miles to the north, where it took up positions to prevent Russian forces from reaching the city of Zaporizhzhia, as of April 2022.

A battalion tactical group of the 128th Brigade under Col. Denys Chaiuk was at training grounds in Dnipropetrovsk Oblast at the beginning of the war. It traveled 200 km in order to reach Melitopol by the next day, covering the retreat of units of the National Guard of Ukraine from the city. It later withdrew to the Vasylivka-Tokmak defensive line, and eventually to a defensive line at Kam'yanske-Orikhiv where it successfully halted the Russian offensive.

In April 2022, units of the brigade took part in the fighting in the Luhansk region. On 7 April, it was announced that soldiers of the brigade had pushed Russian troops 6-10 kilometers away from Kreminna.

The brigade took part in the 2022 Ukrainian southern counteroffensive. In the brigade's native Zakarpattia Oblast on 2 September 2022, a day of mourning was held after the deaths of seven residents of the region who served in the brigade. During the southern counteroffensive, the brigade recaptured Myroliubivka on 3 October 2022, followed by a string of villages on the right bank of the Dnieper River. This was part of an October offensive operation conducted by one of the 128th Brigade's battalions, along with a battalion of Ukraine's 60th Brigade, which forced Russian troops to retreat from parts of the Kherson Oblast west of the Dnieper River towards the villages of Dudchany and Mylove.

On 18 February 2023 President Volodymyr Zelenskyy stated that the brigade was operating and fighting in Zaporizhzhia Oblast. Lysiuk, the brigade's commander, confirmed to The Guardian in mid-October 2023 that the brigade was still fighting in Zaporizhzhia Oblast.

On 3 November 2023 a Russian strike killed members of the brigade while on a ceremony on the occasion of Rocket Forces and Artillery Day, on 5 November Ukrainian MP Oleksiy Kucherenko reported that 28 soldiers had been killed and 53 others wounded. Three days of mourning were held in Zakarpattia Oblast. On 6 November the 128th Brigade itself confirmed the deaths of 19 soldiers in the strike. Lysiuk, who arrived late to the ceremony and was uninjured, was suspended from his position while authorities opened an investigation.

== Structure ==
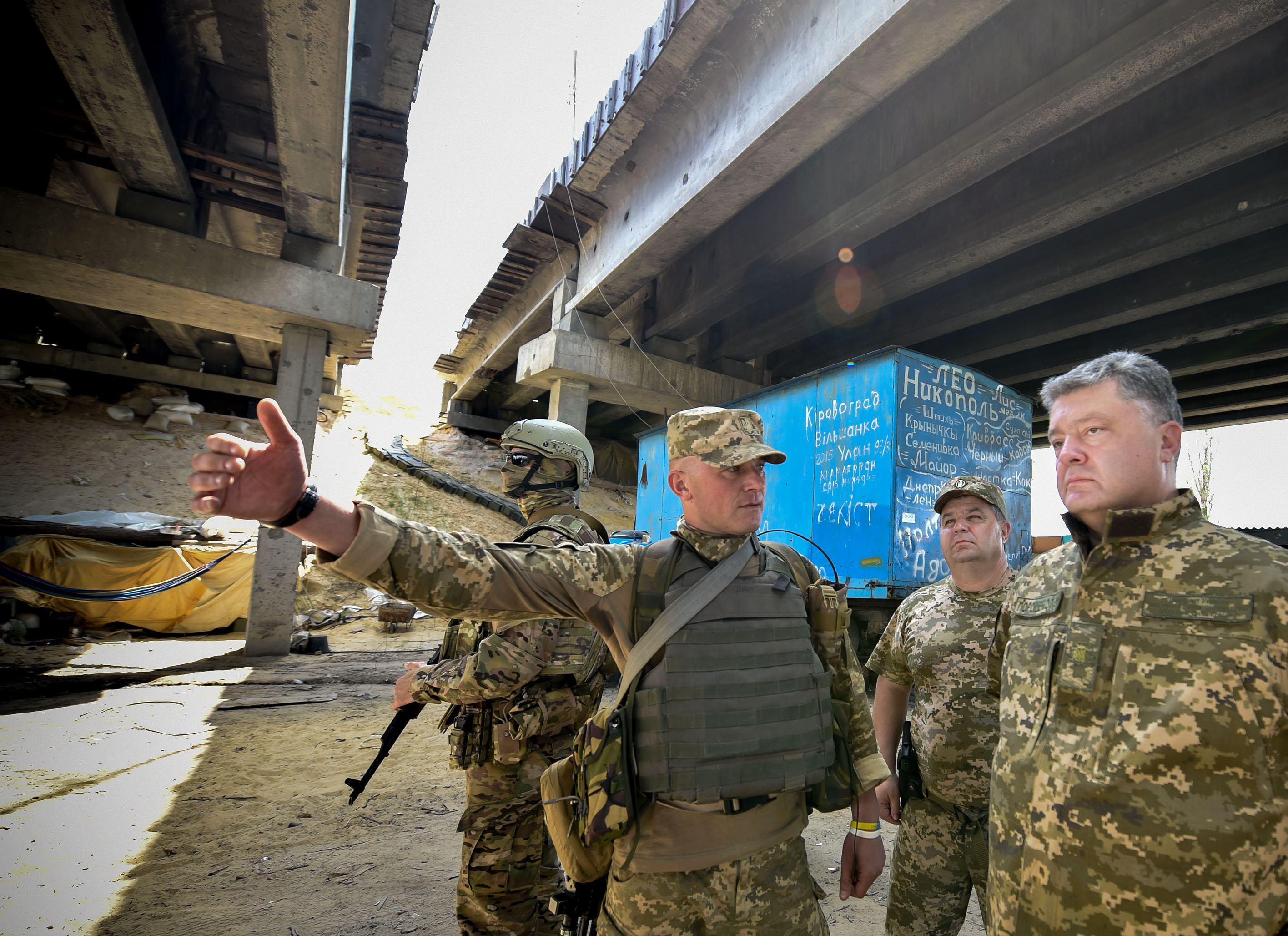
Petro Poroshenko and Stepan Poltorak inspecting the brigade (2016)

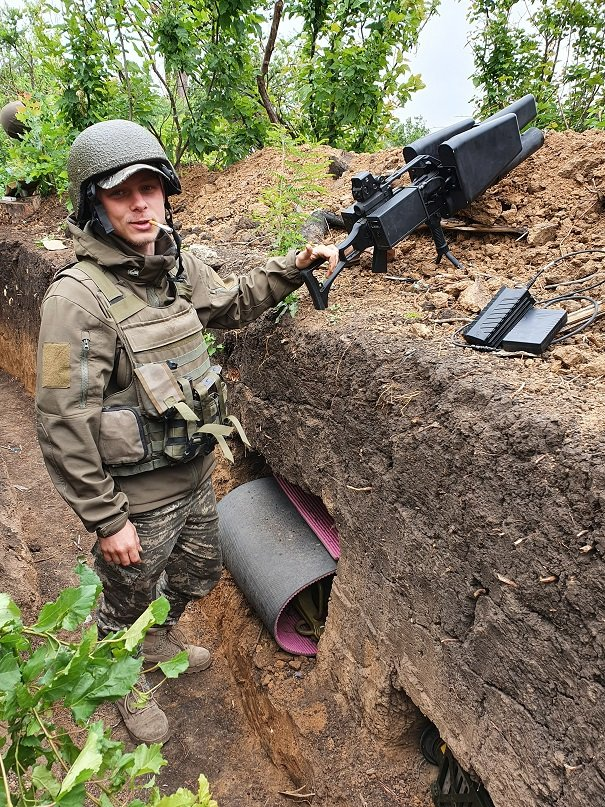
A brigade member with an EDM4S anti-drone rifle during the 2022 Russian invasion of Ukraine

As of 2024, the brigade's structure is as follows:

- 128th Mountain Assault Infantry Brigade, Mukachevo
  - Headquarters and Headquarters Company, Mukachevo
  - 1st Mountain Assault Infantry Battalion "Lynx"
  - 2nd Mountain Assault Infantry Battalion
  - Motorized Infantry Battalion "Bears"
  - 1st Rifle Infantry Battalion
  - 2nd Rifle Infantry Battalion
  - 15th Separate Mountain Assault Infantry Battalion, Uzhhorod
  - Tank Battalion
  - Artillery Division "Ahiles"
    - Target Acquisition Battery "Mavic Band"
    - 1st Self-Propelled Artillery Battalion (2S3 Akatsiya)
    - Self-Propelled Artillery Battalion "Cerberus" (2S1 Gvozdika)
    - Rocket Artillery Battalion (BM-21 Grad)
    - Anti-Tank Battalion (MT-12 Rapira)
  - Anti-Aircraft Defense Artillery Regiment
  - Reconnaissance Company (Mountain)
  - UAV Battalion
  - 534th Separate Combat Engineer Battalion (Mountain)
  - Logistics Battalion
  - Maintenance Battalion
  - Signal Company
  - Radar Company
  - Medical Company
  - Chemical, Biological, Radiological and Nuclear Defense Company
  - MP Company
  - Brigade Band

== Division order of battle ==
- Divisional Headquarters, Uzhhorod
- 315th Mechanized Regiment, Berehove
- 327th Mechanized Regiment, Uzhhorod
- 820th Mechanized Regiment, Mukachevo
- 398th Armor Regiment Uzhorod, Uzhhorod
- 331st Self-Propelled Artillery Regiment, Perechyn
- 757th Anti-Tank Artillery Battalion, Svaliava
- 253rd Anti-Aircraft Missile Regiment, Svaliava
- 47th Reconnaissance Battalion

The 327th Mechanized Regiment was reorganized to form the 15th Mountain Infantry Battalion, which became the first Mountain Infantry formation in the current Ukrainian Ground Forces.

== Former commanders ==
- Serhiy Tumoshkov – 12 July 1922 –
- Colonel Viacheslav Zabolotnyi – 1992 – 1993
- Major General Henadiy Vorobyov – 2001 – 2002
- Colonel Serhiy Horoshnikov – 2002 – 2003
- Vasyl Koka – 2004
- Colonel Viktor Hanushchak – 2007
- Colonel Serhiy Shaptala – 2014 – 2017
- Lieutenant Colonel Serhiy Sobko – 2017 – 2019

== Awards ==
- 8 October 1943, received the honourable designation "Guards" for liberating the region of Kuban and the Taman Peninsula.
- 24 April 1944, received the Order of the Red Banner for participating in the Liberation of Crimea.
- 8 May 1985, received the Order of the Red Banner in honour of the 40th anniversary of Victory Day.
- On 10 January 2000, was presented Regimental Colours and the honorific "Zakarpattia"
- 14 soldiers were awarded orders Hero of the Soviet Union.
- 19 soldiers and sergeants were awarded the Order of Glory.
- 3 personnel were awarded state decorations for valour in the Russo-Ukrainian War, and so far 1 awarded the Gold Star Medal as a Hero of Ukraine (for actions in war in Donbas).
