= Davydiv Brid =

Davydiv Brid Давидів Брід
- Village
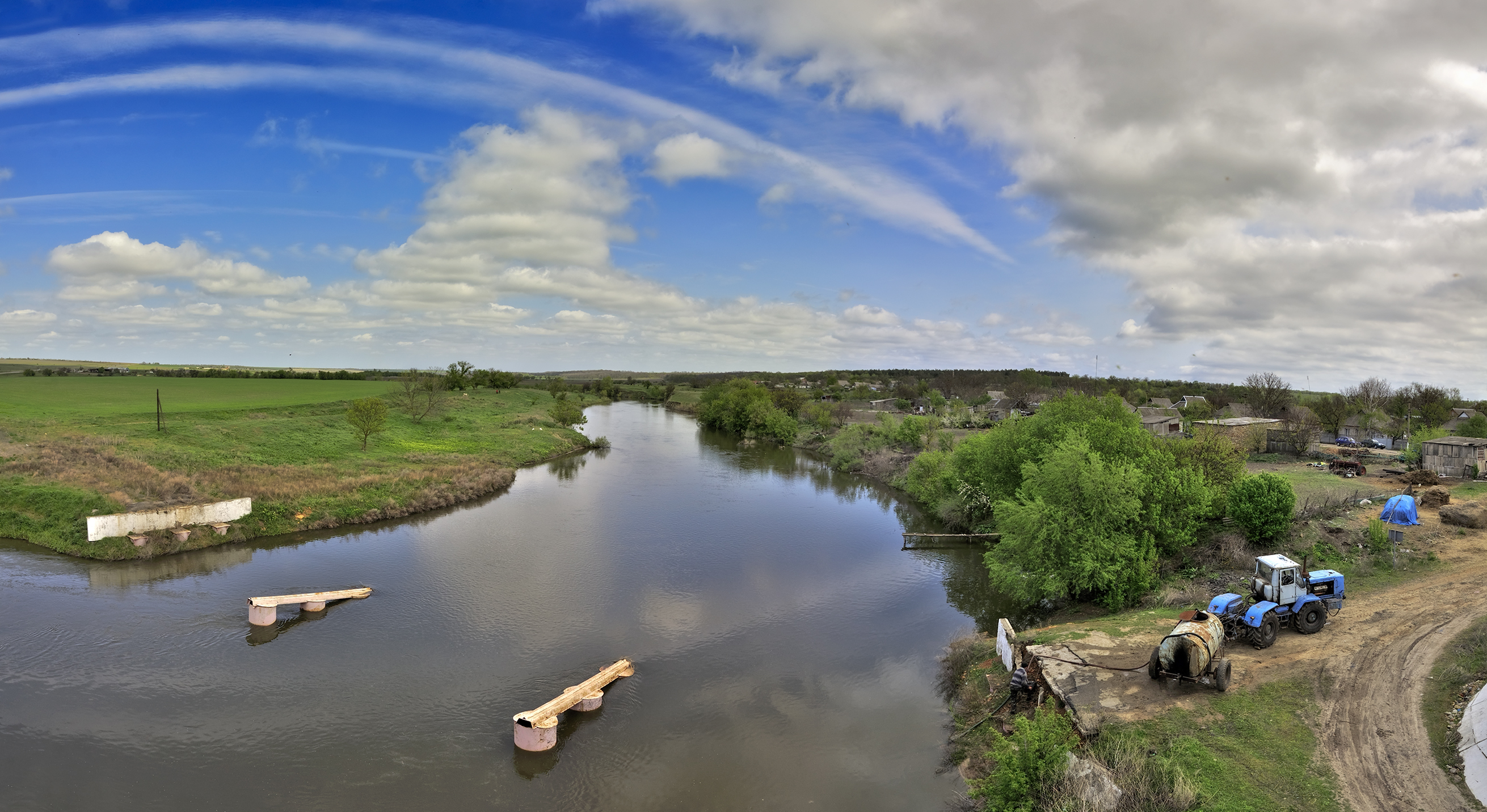
- Interactive map of Davydiv Brid
- Location of Davydiv Brid within Ukraine Davydiv Brid (Ukraine)
- Coordinates: 47.241667°N 33.191111°E
- Country: Ukraine
- Oblast: Kherson Oblast
- Raion: Beryslav Raion
- Hromada: Velyka Oleksandrivka settlement hromada
- Founded: 1795

Area
  - Total: 2.045 km^{2} (0.790 sq mi)
- Elevation: 9 m (30 ft)

Population (2001 census)
  - Total: 1,223
  - Density: 598.0/km^{2} (1,549/sq mi)
- Time zone: UTC+2 (EET)
  - Summer (DST): UTC+3 (EEST)
- Postal code: 74120
- Area code: +380 5532

Davydiv Brid (Ukrainian: Давидів Брід [dɐˈwɪd⁽ʲ⁾iu̯ ˈbr⁽ʲ⁾id]; lit. 'David's ford') is a village in Beryslav Raion, Kherson Oblast, southern Ukraine, about 76 kilometres (47 mi) northeast of the centre of Kherson city. It belongs to the Velyka Oleksandrivka settlement hromada, one of the hromadas of Ukraine. The village lies besides the Inhulets river. The border of Kherson Oblast with Mykolaiv Oblast runs on the north-west side of the village.

On March 12–13, 2022, the village was captured by Russian forces during the Russian invasion of Ukraine. It was later the center of fighting in May and June, being captured by Ukrainian forces by 31 May but retaken by Russian forces on 17 June. The village was ultimately retaken by Ukrainian forces of the 35th Marine Brigade on 4 October, during the 2022 Ukrainian southern counteroffensive.

== History ==
During the Russian Empire, Davydiv Brid was the administrative center of the Davydobrodska Volost, one of the volosts of Khersonskiy Uyezd. In 1886, the village had a population of 683.

=== Russian invasion of Ukraine ===
Davydiv Brid was captured on March 12–13, 2022 by Russian forces during the Russian invasion of Ukraine. On the afternoon of 27 May, Ukraine launched a counterattack in Kherson Oblast near Davydiv Brid. Ukrainian formations, with the support of American-made M777 howitzers, crossed the Inhulets River during the night of 27–28 May around Davydiv Brid, 50 miles northeast of Kherson. The Russians retreated from Davydiv Brid to three towns a few miles southwest. The following day new reports confirmed that Ukrainian forces carried out a successful limited counterattack, forcing Russian forces on the defensive. This Ukrainian counterattack was probably aimed at disrupting Russia's efforts to establish strong defensive positions along the southern axis and to further slow Russia's efforts to consolidate administrative control over occupied southern Ukraine.

On 31 May, satellite imagery showed that Russian troops had withdrawn from Davydiv Brid and set up positions at locations around the town in the previous few days. It was not clear at the time whether Ukrainian troops had entered the town or had positions near Andriivka and Bilohirka. However, in the evening of the same day, the fighting between the Russian and Ukrainian forces escalated. On the night between May 31 and 1 June, Ukrainian sources announced that Ukrainian forces had captured the town of Davydiv Brid.

Fierce battles between Ukrainian and Russian forces for Davydiv Brid continued in the first half of June with neither side able to assume full control. Artillery strikes became commonplace on both sides. On 6 June, Russian sources reported the Ukrainian bridgehead at Davydiv Brid had been destroyed and Ukrainian forces pushed back over the Inhulets River, which was confirmed by the Institute for the Study of War (ISW) two weeks later, affirming Russian forces had retaken the eastern bank of the river.

On 13 June, Ukrainian forces were still reported to be engaged in heavy fighting with Russian forces near Davydiv Brid. Ukrainian commanders claimed their forces gradually forced Russian troops back and were testing their second and third lines of defense. Artillery duels over the river continued between 17 and 21 June, with the ISW reporting Russian forces had pushed back Ukrainian troops sometime before 17 June. Still, on 5 July, ISW reported that Ukrainian forces retained control of some territory in the area, although precise boundaries were unclear.

From the end of August, Ukrainian forces again pushed towards Davydiv Brid during a counteroffensive in Kherson Oblast. From 2 to 3 October, Ukrainian forces attacked the town, but were repelled twice. Still, by 4 October, Russian forces withdrew and the town was captured by Ukrainian forces of the 35th Marine Brigade.

== Demographics ==
According to the 2001 Ukrainian Census, the village had 1223 inhabitants.

The native language of the village as of 2001 were:

Language	People	%%
Ukrainian	1177	96.24%
Russian	40	3.27%
Moldovan (Romanian)	2	0.16%
Belarusian	1	0.08%
Hungarian	1	0.08%
Others	2	0.17%
