= Havrylivka =

Havrylivka may refer to the following villages in Ukraine:

- Havrylivka, Chernihiv Oblast
- Havrylivka, Dnipropetrovsk Oblast
- Havrylivka, Kyiv Oblast
- Havrylivka, Kherson Oblast
- Havrylivka, Luhansk Oblast
