= Sablukivka, Kherson Oblast, Ukraine =

Sablukivka Саблу́ківка
- Village
- Location of Sablukivka within Ukraine Sablukivka (Ukraine)
- Coordinates: 47°7′22″N 33°46′18″E
- Country: Ukraine
- Oblast: Mykolaiv Oblast
- Raion: Beryslav Raion
- Founded: 1794

Area
  - Total: 0.827 km^{2} (0.319 sq mi)
- Elevation: 92 m (302 ft)

Population
  - Total: 301
  - Density: 363.97/km^{2} (942.7/sq mi)
- Postal code: 74350
- Area code: +380 5546

Sablukivka (Ukrainian: Саблу́ківка) is a village in the Beryslav Raion of the Kherson Oblast, Ukraine. The population is 301 people.

== History ==
In 1886, the population was 222, and there was a small prayer house, several dozen yards and a poultry farm.

The village suffered from the Holodomor, in 1932–1933. According to the martyrology of the National Book of Memory of Ukraine, compiled on the basis of data from the Book of Civil Status Registration Acts and the testimonies of eyewitnesses, 16 people died.

During the Russian invasion of Ukraine, the village was captured by Russian forces and occupied until its liberation during the 2022 Ukrainian southern counteroffensive.

On January 23, 2023, the village was extensively shelled by Russian forces.

== Geography ==
The elevation is 92 meters above sea level.

Moreover, it is located on the left bank of the Dnipro river, near the village Dudchany.
