= Minnigali Gubaidullin =

Hero of the Soviet Union (1921–1944)

Minnigali Khabibullovich Gubaidullin
- Миннигали Хабибуллович Губайду́ллин; Миңнеғәле Хәбибулла улы Ғөбәйҙуллин; Миңнегали Хәбибулла улы Гобәйдуллин
- Born: 8 March 1921; Urshakbashkaramaly, Miyakinsky District of the Bashkir Autonomous Soviet Socialist Republic
- Died: 8 March 1944 (aged 23); Dudchany, Novovorontsovka Raion, Kherson Oblast, UkSSR
- Military career
- Allegiance: Soviet Union
- Branch: Red Army
- Service years: 1941–1944
- Rank: Guards Lieutenant
- Conflicts: World War II
- Awards: Hero of the Soviet Union

Minnigali Khabibullovich Gubaidullin (Tatar: Миңнегали Хәбибулла улы Гобәйдуллин, Bashkir: Миңнеғәле Хәбибулла улы Ғөбәйҙуллин, Russian: Миннигали Хабибуллович Губайду́ллин) (March 8, 1921 - March 8, 1944) was a lieutenant in the Red Army and a recipient of the title Hero of the Soviet Union. During World War II he commanded a machine-gun platoon in the 309th Guards Rifle Regiment of the 109th Guards Rifle Division.

== Early life ==
He was born in Urshakbashkaramaly, Miyakinsky District of the Bashkir Autonomous Soviet Socialist Republic, into a peasant family on October 28 (according to other sources, March 8), 1923.

Historical sources disagree as to whether Minnigali's family was ethnically Tatar or a Bashkir, however archival documents tend to support the Tatar interpretation.

In July 1939, Minnigali moved to Asha, and worked in the blast-furnace workshop of the Ashinskiy metallurgical plant. In 1940-1941 he studied at an oil technical school in Baku.

In 1941 he was drafted into the Red Army. He graduated from the crash course of the military school in 1942. From 1942 he was at the front. He enlisted in the 109th Infantry Division in June 1943.

On September 26–27, 1943, he showed courage in battles on the Molochnaya river. Wounded twice, he refused to leave the battlefield. For his courage and determination shown in battles from January 21 to February 4, 1944, northeast of the 5th kilometer of the village of Solomki, Nikolaev region, in an offensive battle on February 7, 1944, in the settlement of Velyka Lepetykha, by order of February 13, 1944, he was awarded the Order of the Red Star.

His older brother Gubaidullin Timirgali Khabibullovich also fought in the war and was reported missing in action in April 1944.

On March 8, 1944, platoon commander, Lieutenant Gubaidullin, was ordered to suppress enemy positions at one of the defensive mounds at any cost and break the enemy's defensive line on the Dudchana-Ryadovoye line. During the assault, Minnigali was seriously wounded, blocking the embrasure of the enemy bunker with his body. On June 3, 1944, by a decree of the Presidium of the Supreme Soviet, Guard Lieutenant M. Kh. Gubaidullin was awarded the title of Hero of the Soviet Union.

He was buried in Nikolaev Oblast on the northwestern outskirts of the village of Aleksandrovka, and reburied on a mound near the village of Dudchany.

== Recognition ==
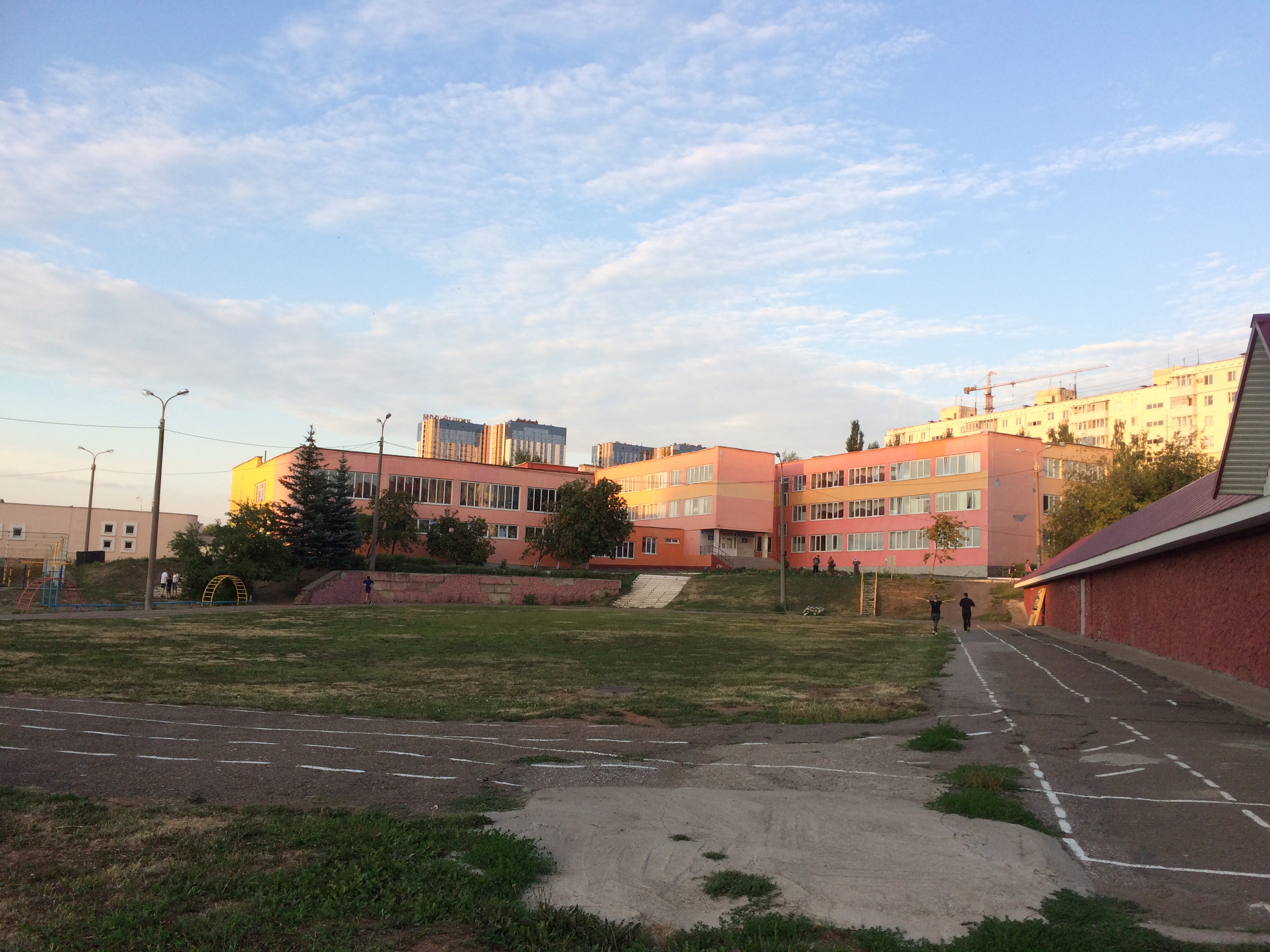
Lyceum No. 94 named after Gubaidullin (Ufa city )

Monuments honor him in the village of Dudchany, the village of Kirgiz-Miyaki, Miyakinsky district of the Republic of Bashkortostan, in the city of Ufa. A bust was installed at home in the village of Urshakbashkaramaly.

Streets in Dudchany, Kherson, Beryslav, Novovorontsovka, Salavat and Ufa are named for him; Lyceum No. 94 in Ufa.

An eternal flame burns near the monument dedicated to Matrosov and Gubaidullin in Ufa. The memorial is located in Victory Park (1980, sculptors L. Kerbel, N. Lyubimov, G. Lebedev).

Bashkir writer Yanybai Khammatov spoke about the feat of Gubaidullin in his biographical novel Тыуған көн (Birthday).

== Sources ==
- Герои Советского Союза: Краткий биографический словарь / Пред. ред. коллегии И. Н. Шкадов. — М.: Воениздат, 1987. — Т. 1 /Абаев — Любичев/. — 911 с. — 100 000 экз. — ISBN отс., Рег. No. в РКП 87-95382
