= Myroliubivka =

Myroliubivka may refer to the following places in Ukraine:

- Myroliubivka, Beryslav Raion, Kherson Oblast
- Myroliubivka, Kherson Raion, Kherson Oblast
