= Osokorivka =

Osokorivka (Ukrainian: Осокорівка) is an inhabited locality in Ukraine and it may refer to:

- Osokorivka, Chernihiv Oblast, a village in Nizhyn Raion, Chernihiv Oblast
- Osokorivka, Dnipropetrovsk Oblast, a village in Synelnykove Raion, Dnipropetrovsk Oblast
- Osokorivka, Kherson Oblast, a village in Beryslav Raion, Kherson Oblast
