= Khreshchenivka =

Rural locality in Kherson Oblast, Ukraine

Khreshchenivka Хрещенівка
- Village
- Interactive map of Khreshchenivka
- Location of Khreshchenivka within Ukraine Khreshchenivka (Ukraine)
- Coordinates: 47.385278°N 33.821667°E
- Country: Ukraine
- Oblast: Kherson Oblast
- District: Beryslav Raion
- Founded: 1821

Area
  - Total: 197.5 km^{2} (76.3 sq mi)
- Elevation: 82 m (269 ft)

Population (2001 census)
  - Total: 737
  - Density: 3.73/km^{2} (9.66/sq mi)
- Time zone: UTC+2 (EET)
  - Summer (DST): UTC+3 (EEST)
- Postal code: 74213
- Area code: +380 5533

Khreshchenivka (Ukrainian: Хрещенівка; Russian: Крещеновка) is a village in Beryslav Raion, Kherson Oblast, southern Ukraine, about 127 kilometres (79 mi) northeast of the centre of Kherson city. It belongs to the Novovorontsovka settlement hromada, one of the hromadas of Ukraine.

== Administrative status ==
Until 18 July 2020, Khreshchenivka belonged to Novovorontsovka Raion. The raion was abolished in July 2020 as part of the administrative reform of Ukraine, which reduced the number of raions of Kherson Oblast to five. The area of Novovorontsovka Raion was merged into Beryslav Raion.

== History ==
Khreshchenivka was founded in 1821. Prior to the October Revolution, the village's land belonged to the Princess of Svyatopolk-Mirsky. Her primary estate was located in the nearby village of Zolota Balka. Most of the peasants that settled in the new lands were natives of the village of Osokorivka. Later, after the Soviet Union established power, the artel called "Reconstructor" was organized. The village was later occupied by German troops during the Great Patriotic War from 21 August 1941 to 27 February 1944. In 1972, the village council for the village was formally established.

The village came under attack by Russian forces during the Russian invasion of Ukraine in 2022 and the 3rd of October 2022 was recovered by the Ukrainian forces in a new offensive. However, the village remains heavily damaged due to Russian shelling, and residential buildings were destroyed.

== Demographics ==
The native language distribution as of the Ukrainian Census of 2001 was:

- Ukrainian: 95.90%
- Russian: 3.21%
- Belarusian: 0.38%
- Bulgarian: 0.13%
- Moldovan (Romanian): 0.13%
- Polish: 0.13%

== Monuments ==
There is a memorial complex in memory of the fallen soldiers of World War II located in the village.
