= Sukhyi Stavok =

Village in Kherson Oblast, Ukraine

Sukhyi Stavok Сухий Ставок
- Village
- Interactive map of Sukhyi Stavok
- Location of Sukhyi Stavok within Ukraine Sukhyi Stavok (Ukraine)
- Coordinates: 47.158060°N 33.103610°E
- Country: Ukraine
- Oblast: Kherson Oblast
- District: Beryslav Raion
- Founded: 1898

Area
  - Total: 0.512 km^{2} (0.198 sq mi)
- Elevation: 64 m (210 ft)

Population (2001 census)
  - Total: 117
  - Density: 229/km^{2} (592/sq mi)
- Time zone: UTC+2 (EET)
  - Summer (DST): UTC+3 (EEST)
- Postal code: 74101
- Area code: +380 5532

Sukhyi Stavok (Ukrainian: Сухий Ставок) is a village in Beryslav Raion, Kherson Oblast, southern Ukraine. It is located about 72.6 kilometres (45.1 mi) north-northeast from the centre of Kherson city, and about 5 kilometres (3.1 mi) south-east from Andriivka.

== History ==
The village was founded in 1898. During the Great Patriotic War, the village was occupied by German troops from 27 August 1941 to 12 March 1944. In 1967, the village belonged to the Novohrednivka village council. It was also the location of brigade no. 4 of the Shevchenko collective farm during the Soviet times.

The village came under attack by Russian forces in 2022, during the Russian invasion of Ukraine. On 29 August 2022 the village was claimed to be liberated by Ukrainian forces during the opening phase of the 2022 Kherson counteroffensive. However, the village was completely destroyed in the midst of the war, with nobody living in the village anymore.

== Administrative status ==
On 12 June 2020 in accordance with the Order of the Cabinet of Ministers of Ukraine, it became part of the Kalynivka hromada. On 19 July 2020 as a result of the administrative-territorial reform and liquidation of the Velyka Oleksandrivka Raion, the village became part of the Beryslav Raion.

== Demographics ==
According to the 2001 Ukrainian Census, the only official census taken in post-independence Ukraine, the population of the village was 117 people. Of the people residing in the village, their mother tongue is as follows:

Language	Percentage of Population
Ukrainian	94.02%
Russian	2.56%
Moldovan Romanian language	2.56%
Other	0.86
