= Kryvyi Rih operational group =

- Active: 2022
- Country: Ukraine
- Branch: Armed Forces of Ukraine
- Type: Regional command
- Engagements: Russian invasion of Ukraine
- Website: https://www.facebook.com/ouvKryvyiRih

The Kryvyi Rih operational group was a temporary formation of the Ukrainian Ground Forces in Ukraine active in the 2022 Russian invasion of Ukraine. The Kryvyi Rih operational group's artillery was reported to have coordinated with the 129th Territorial Defense Brigade to attack Russian units. On October 13, the operational group reported that the deputy commander of the 60th Separate Infantry Brigade was killed. A few days earlier on the 6th, the operational group reported that Russian forces destroyed several World War II monuments in the Kherson region.
