= Eduard von Falz-Fein =

Russian-born Liechtensteiner sports diplomat (1912–2018)

Baron Eduard von Falz-Fein
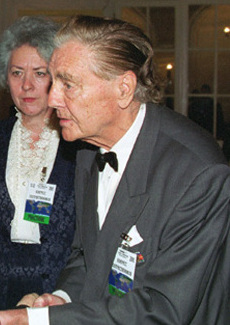
- Falz-Fein in 2001
- Born: 14 September 1912; Gavrilovka, Kherson uezd, Kherson Governorate, Russian Empire (Note: now Havrylivka, Novooleksandrivka rural hromada, Beryslav Raion, Kherson Oblast, Ukraine)
- Died: 17 November 2018 (aged 106); Vaduz, Liechtenstein

Baron Eduard Oleg Alexandrowitsch von Falz-Fein (14 September 1912 – 17 November 2018) was a Liechtensteiner businessman, journalist, and sportsman.

== Biography ==
Von Falz-Fein was born in Havrylivka, Kherson Governorate, Russian Empire (now Ukraine). His father Alexander Eduardovich was an agronomist, brother of the founder of the Askania-Nova biosphere reserve in southern Ukraine, Friedrich von Falz-Fein. His mother Vera Nikolaevna was from a family of generals and admirals of the Russian fleet Yepanchins.

He served as a "sports diplomat" who under his initiative, alongside Woldemar von Falz-Fein, formed the Olympic movement in Liechtenstein and was vice president of the Liechtenstein Olympic Committee in the mid-1930s.

In 1951 and from 1953 until 1973, he was President of the Liechtenstein Cycling Association. Falz-Fein funded much of the research on the identification of the Romanov family remains. He turned 100 on 14 September 2012. He was a cousin of an Olympic bobsledder Eduard Theodor von Falz-Fein (1912–1974). Falz-Fein died in a house fire in Vaduz on 17 November 2018 at the age of 106. At the time of his death, Eduard was the oldest living resident of Liechtenstein.

In the years after the Second World War he was a key promoter of tourism to Liechtenstein he opened the Quick Tourist Office a shop for tourists in Vaduz. He persuaded bus tour companies to stop in Vaduz pitching them they could upgrade six-country tours into seven-country tours at no extra expense. He would greet the buses as they arrived giving the tourists a short introduction to the nation.

Falz-Fein is credited in Russia with helping bring the 1980 Summer Olympics to Moscow. Ideologically unfriendly to communism, he still considered Russia [the Soviet Union] his homeland and lobbied IOC members to vote for Moscow. He was friends with Soviet sports officials.

== Honours ==
Liechtenstein

- "Golden Laurel" (2003) (awarded in recognition of the outstanding achievements of successful athletes and people who have provided a great service for the sphere of sport in Liechtenstein)
- Baron of Liechtenstein - Liechtenstein nobility.

Soviet Union

- Emeritus of the Union of Soviet Societies for Friendship and Cultural Relations with Foreign Countries "For contribution to friendship"

Russia

- Order of Friendship of Peoples (26 October 1993) – for the active long-term advocacy of Russian culture abroad
- Order of Honour (14 September 2002) – for outstanding contribution to the preservation and promotion of Russian culture abroad, strengthening friendship and cooperation between the peoples of the Russian Federation and the Principality of Liechtenstein
- Pushkin Medal (20 August 2007) – for outstanding contribution to the preservation of the cultural heritage of Russia
- Medal "In Commemoration of the 300th Anniversary of Saint Petersburg"
- By the President of the Russian Federation (14 November 1998) – for outstanding contribution to the preservation and repatriation of Russian art and objects of historical heritage
- Order of St. Sergius, 2nd class (Russian Orthodox Church, 2002) – for outstanding contribution to the development of Russian culture and in connection with the anniversary
- Tsarskoye Selo Art Prize (1997)

Ukraine

- Order of Prince Yaroslav the Wise

4th class (24 August 2012) – for a significant contribution to strengthening the international authority of Ukraine, the popularization of its historical heritage and modern achievements and to mark the 21st anniversary of the Independence of Ukraine
5th class (13 September 2007) – for outstanding contribution to the preservation of Ukrainian heritage, and active participation in the development of conservation and environmental education activities at the Biosphere Reserve Askania-Nova, named FE Pfalz-Fein Ukrainian Academy of Agricultural Sciences

- Order of Merit

1st class (15 November 2002) – for his significant contribution to the improvement of the international prestige of Ukraine, long fruitful charity
2nd class (22 May 1998) – for his significant contribution to the preservation of the Ukrainian historical and cultural heritage, the active promotion of the Biosphere Reserve Askania-Nova

- Honorary Insignia of the President of Ukraine (1994) – for long-term selfless activity to return to the Ukraine national cultural values, personal contribution to the renewal of the reserve Askania-Nova
- Diploma of the Cabinet of Ministers of Ukraine with a memorable mark (21 May 1998) – a personal contribution and active assistance in the restoration of historical and cultural heritage of the Biosphere Reserve Askania-Nova

Other

- International Prize "Crystal Globe"
- Awarded to Nicholas Roerich (2004)

== Sources ==
- Zadereychuk, Alla. Faltz-Feins in Tavria. –Simferopol: Dolya, 2010.
- article 2007 (in German)
- Massie, Robert K. (1995). The Romanovs: The Final Chapter.
- Sack, John (1959). Report from Practically Nowhere. New York: Curtis Publishing Company. pp. 93–107.
