= Kakhovka operational group =

- Active: 2022-2025
- Country: Ukraine
- Branch: Ukrainian Ground Forces
- Type: Regional command

The Kakhovka operational group, or operational grouping of troops "Kakhovka", was a formation of the Ukrainian Ground Forces in Ukraine active in the 2022 Russian invasion of Ukraine. The operational group participated in the Liberation of Kherson as part of the southern Ukrainian counteroffensive.

== History ==
The Kakhovka operational group participated in the 2022 Ukrainian southern counteroffensive on Russian position in the Kherson Oblast on the western bank of the Dnipro River. On August 29, the operational group reported operations against Russian forces, also reporting that the 109th Regiment of the Donetsk People's Republic and Russian airborne forces abandoned their positions. Video released by the operational group of their claimed breakthrough in the Kherson front lines was accompanied by statements confirming offensive operations by Ukraine's Operational Command South.
