= Biliaivka, Kherson Oblast =

Biliaivka Біляївка
- Village
- Interactive map of Biliaivka
- Location of Biliaivka within Ukraine Biliaivka (Ukraine)
- Coordinates: 47.324444°N 33.701944°E
- Country: Ukraine Ukraine
- Oblast: Kherson Oblast
- District: Beryslav Raion
- Founded: 1888

Area
  - Total: 187.4 km^{2} (72.4 sq mi)
- Elevation: 77 m (253 ft)

Population (2001 census)
  - Total: 684
  - Density: 3.65/km^{2} (9.45/sq mi)
- Time zone: UTC+2 (EET)
  - Summer (DST): UTC+3 (EEST)
- Postal code: 74221
- Area code: +380 5533

Biliaivka (Ukrainian: Біляївка) is a village in Beryslav Raion, Kherson Oblast, southern Ukraine, about 123 kilometres (76 mi) northeast from the centre of Kherson city.

== History ==
Biliaivka was founded in 1888 by immigrants from Odessa and some of the locals from Novovorontsovka and Zolota Balka. After it was integrated into the Soviet Union, the village was the central estate of the collective farm "Stepovysi". In 1926, the society for joint cultivation of land "Bidnyak" was founded in the village, and in 1929, the original collective farm for the village, Svitanok, was organized. From August 1941 to October 1944, the city was under German occupation during World War II. Stepovysi (which the central farm had been called since 1963) in 1967 participated in the Exhibition of Achievements of the National Economy of the USSR, receiving a second-degree diploma. The collective farm specialized in grain crops, meat, and dairy products. On 12 June 2020 during decentralization, the Bilyaiv Village Council was merged with that of the Novooleksandrivka territorial community.

The village came under attack by Russian forces in 2022, during the Russian invasion of Ukraine, and was liberated by Ukrainian forces in the beginning of October. According to subsequent reports, multiple civilians were detained and sent into captivity by Russian forces to a makeshift prison during the occupation. Around the area, since 2025, FPV drones from Russian forces have continued to target people.

== Demographics ==
The settlement had 684 inhabitants in 2001. The native language distribution as of the Ukrainian Census of 2001:

- Ukrainian: 97.00%
- Russian: 3.00%

== Monuments ==
In 2010 an architectural and artistic ensemble to the soldiers who died during World War II was erected in the city.
