= Bilohirka, Kherson Oblast =

Bilohirka Білогірка
- Village
- Interactive map of Bilohirka
- Location of Bilohirka within Ukraine Bilohirka (Ukraine)
- Coordinates: 47.2°N 33.138611°E
- Country: Ukraine
- Oblast: Kherson Oblast
- Raion: Beryslav Raion
- Founded: 1795

Area
  - Total: 0.227 km^{2} (0.088 sq mi)
- Elevation: 43 m (141 ft)

Population (2001 census)
  - Total: 135
  - Density: 595/km^{2} (1,540/sq mi)
- Time zone: UTC+2 (EET)
  - Summer (DST): UTC+3 (EEST)
- Postal code: 74101
- Area code: +380 5532

Bilohirka (Ukrainian: Білогірка; Russian: Белогорка) is a village in the Beryslav Raion of Kherson Oblast in southern Ukraine, about 76 kilometres (47 mi) north-east of the centre of Kherson city, beside the Inhulets river. The border of Kherson Oblast with Mykolaiv Oblast runs along the river on the north-west side of the village.

== History ==
The village was founded in 1795. From 23 August 1941 to 12 March 1944 the village was occupied by German troops during the Great Patriotic War. On 19 July 2020, as part of administrative-territorial reform and the liquidation of the Velyka Oleksandrivka Raion, the village was merged into the Beryslav Raion.

The village came under attack by Russian forces in May 2022, during the Russian invasion of Ukraine and was regained by Ukrainian forces by August/September the same year. However, as a result of the fighting, the village was almost completely destroyed, with nearly every building in the village being damaged (about 98%), and the village being heavily mined. However, residents still returned to the village afterwards in August 2023, with ten families currently residing.

The village was known for its melon fields and orchards.

== Demographics ==
According to the 2001 Ukrainian Census, the only official census taken in post-independence Ukraine, the population of the village was 135 people. Of the people residing in the village, their mother tongue is as follows:

Language	Percentage of Population
Ukrainian	99.26%
Other	0.74%

== Monuments ==
The village has multiple mounds, with the largest of the mounds being about 6.5 m high and 40 m in diameter, located 1.2 km southeast of the village.
