= Woldemar von Falz-Fein =

Ukrainian–Liechtenstein baron and Olympian (1877–1946)

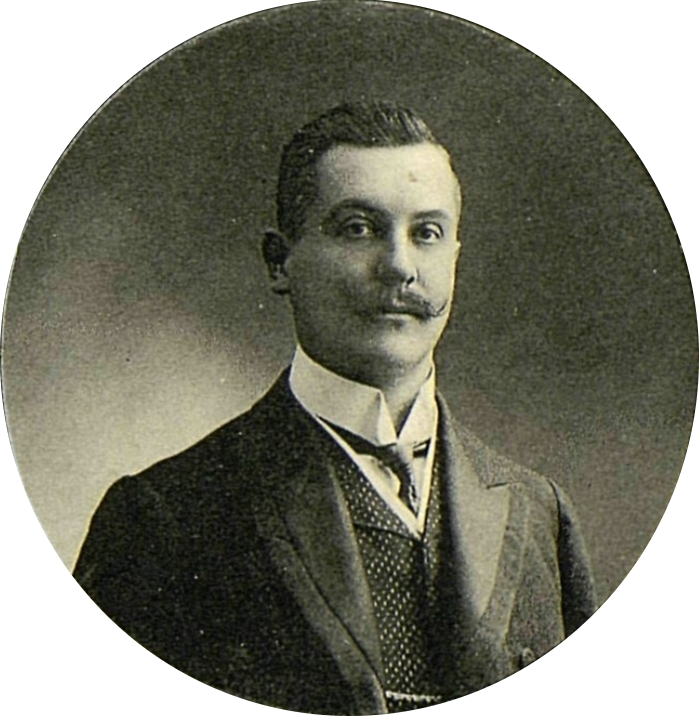
Woldemar von Falz-Fein

Woldemar von Falz-Fein (1 August 1877 – 1946) was a Liechtenstein baron of Ukrainian descent. Under his initiative, the Liechtenstein Olympic Committee was founded in 1935, alongside Eduard von Falz-Fein.
