= Mykhailivka, Beryslav Raion, Kherson Oblast =

Mykhailivka Миха́йлівка
- Village
- Interactive map of Mykhailivka
- Mykhailivka in Kherson Oblast Mykhailivka (Ukraine)
- Coordinates: 47°18′34″N 33°57′16″E
- Country: Ukraine
- Oblast: Kherson Oblast
- Raion: Beryslav Raion

Area
  - Total: 161.4 km^{2} (62.3 sq mi)

Population (2001 census)
  - Total: 1,179
  - Density: 7.305/km^{2} (18.92/sq mi)

Mykhailivka (Ukrainian: Миха́йлівка) is a village in Ukraine, located in Beryslav Raion, Kherson Oblast. It has a population of 1179 people.

== History ==
In the early days of the full-scale Russian invasion of Ukraine, Russian forces occupied the village.

On 3 October 2022, the village was liberated by Ukrainian forces.

== Demographics ==
In the 1989 Soviet census, it was recorded the village had 1271 inhabitants, of whom 586 were men and 685 were women.

As of the 2001 Ukrainian census, the population had shrunk to 1179 people. The native languages of the population were 98.18% Ukrainian, 1.57% Russian, and 0.25% Belarusian.
