= Tryfonivka =

Village in Kherson Oblast, Ukraine

Tryfonivka Трифонівка
- Village
- Interactive map of Tryfonivka
- Tryfonivka in Kherson Oblast Tryfonivka (Ukraine)
- Coordinates: 47.256111°N 33.5125°E
- Country: Ukraine
- Oblast: Kherson Oblast
- Raion: Beryslav Raion
- Founded: 1863

Area
  - Total: 1.767 km^{2} (0.682 sq mi)
- Elevation: 74 m (243 ft)

Population (2001 census)
  - Total: 803
  - Density: 454/km^{2} (1,180/sq mi)
- Time zone: UTC+2 (EET)
  - Summer (DST): UTC+3 (EEST)
- Postal code: 75150
- Area code: +380 5532

Tryfonivka (Ukrainian: Трифонівка) is a village in Beryslav Raion (district) in Kherson Oblast of southern Ukraine, about 96.4 kilometres (59.9 mi) northeast of Kharkiv. It belongs to Velyka Oleksandrivka settlement hromada, one of the hromadas of Ukraine.

== History ==
The village was established in 1863. After the liberal Emancipation reform of 1861, peasants were allowed to resettle in new territories, and so a priest named Tryfon arrived on the uninhabited land of Tryfonivka. Tryfon built a church, which led to other residents from the region, mainly from Tiraspol and Ananiv, coming to settle. It was originally called Popivka, or "Priest's Village", since Tryfon was a priest, but it was later changed to be named after him. The Soviet Union occupied the village starting in 1918, and in 1922, the first agricultural cultural collectives were organized in the village called the "Red Tiller" and the Andreev Collective. During the Great Patriotic War the village was occupied from 25 August 1941 to 12 March 1944. It was later the site of the central estate of the "Rodyna" collective farm during later Soviet times, which managed 6,400 hectares of agricultural land and specialized in meat and dairy production.

In 2017, a solar power plant with a capacity of 10 MW was commissioned in the village to generate green electricity, which was a pilot project of the company DTEK. It will generate 11-12 million kWh of electricity annually for the surrounding villages. The village came under attack by Russian forces in 2022 during the Russian invasion of Ukraine and was regained by Ukrainian forces on 6 October 2022.

== Religion ==
There is a Ukrainian Orthodox Church – Kyiv Patriarchate named in honor of the Protection of the Holy Virgin located in the village.
