= Osokorivka, Dnipropetrovsk Oblast =

Rural locality in Dnipropetrovsk Oblast, Ukraine

Osokorivka Осокорівка
- Interactive map of Osokorivka
- Location in Ukraine Osokorivka (Ukraine)
- Coordinates: 48°07′32″N 35°21′03″E
- Country: Ukraine
- Oblast: Dnipropetrovsk Oblast
- Raion: Synelnykove Raion
- Village founded: 1783
- Elevation: 64 m (210 ft)

Population (2001)
  - Total: 79
- Time zone: UTC+2 (EET)
  - Summer (DST): UTC+3 (EEST)
- Postal code: 52550
- Area code: +380 5663

Osokorivka (Ukrainian: Осокорівка) is a village in Synelnykove Raion, Dnipropetrovsk Oblast, southeastern Ukraine. It belongs to the Slavhorod settlement hromada, one of the hromadas of Ukraine.

== Archeology ==
In 1931, before the flooding of the Dnieper Rapids, the Osokorov site of the late Paleolithic and early Middle Stone Age was excavated here. Repeated excavations were carried out in 1944, when the waters of the reservoir were drained due to the destruction of the dam. According to finds of the Early Middle Stone Age (layers 1–3), the Osokorov culture of the steppe Naddnipryanshchyna and the south-east of Ukraine was distinguished.
