= Bruskynske =

Village in Kherson Oblast, Ukraine

Bruskynske Брускинське
- Village
- Interactive map of Bruskynske
- Location of Bruskynske within Ukraine Bruskynske (Ukraine)
- Coordinates: 47.1575°N 33.209444°E
- Country: Ukraine
- Oblast: Kherson Oblast
- Raion: Beryslav Raion
- Founded: 1906

Area
  - Total: 1.89 km^{2} (0.73 sq mi)
- Elevation: 68 m (223 ft)

Population (2001 census)
  - Total: 436
  - Density: 231/km^{2} (597/sq mi)
- Time zone: UTC+2 (EET)
  - Summer (DST): UTC+3 (EEST)
- Postal code: 75121
- Area code: +380 5532

Bruskynske (Ukrainian: Брускинське; Russian: Брускинское) is a village in Beryslav Raion (district) in Kherson Oblast of southern Ukraine, at about 79.2 kilometres (49.2 mi) northeast by north from the centre of Kherson city. Bruskynske belongs to Velyka Oleksandrivka settlement hromada, one of the hromadas of Ukraine. According to the 2001 Ukrainian Census, the population of the village is 436.

== History ==
The village was founded as a monastic hamlet sometime in the second half of the 19th century. During the Great Patriotic War, the village was occupied by German troops from 26 August 1941 to 12 March 1944. During later Soviet times, the village hosted an agricultural enterprise known as the Gorky Collective Farm. Gorky was established in 1965 by merging two collective farms called Molotov and Gorky.

On 19 July 2020 as a result of the administrative-territorial reform and the liquidation of the Velyka Oleksandrivka Raion, the village was incorporated into the Beryslav Raion. The village came under attack by Russian forces in 2022, during the Russian invasion of Ukraine, and was occupied until 11 November of the same year. However, after liberation, the village remained heavily destroyed and bodies of tortured residents were found.

== Demographics ==
According to the 2001 Ukrainian Census, the only official census taken in post-independence Ukraine, the population of the village was 436 people. Of the people residing in the village, their mother tongue is as follows:

| Language | Percentage of Population |
|---|---|
| Ukrainian | 94.50% |
| Russian | 4.13% |
| Moldovan | 1.14% |
| Other | 0.23% |

== Monuments ==
The village has an Obelisk of Glory.
