= Urshakbashkaramaly =

Urshakbashkaramaly Уршакбашкарамалы
- Selo
- Location within Bashkortostan Location within Russia
- Coordinates: 53°37′N 55°08′E
- Country: Russia
- Region: Bashkortostan
- District: Miyakinsky District
- Time zone: UTC+5:00

Urshakbashkaramaly (Russian: Уршакбашкарамалы; Bashkir: Өршәкбаш-Ҡарамалы, Örşäkbaş-Qaramalı) is a rural locality (a selo) and the administrative centre of Urshakbashkaramalinsky Selsoviet, Miyakinsky District, Bashkortostan, Russia. The population was 620 as of 2010. There are 8 streets.

== Geography ==
Urshakbashkaramaly is located 31 km east of Kirgiz-Miyaki (the district's administrative centre) by road. Urshak is the nearest rural locality.
