= Havrylivka, Kherson Oblast =

Village in Kherson Oblast, Ukraine

Havrylivka Гаврилівка
- Village
- Interactive map of Havrylivka
- Location of Havrylivka in Kherson Oblast Havrylivka (Ukraine)
- Coordinates: 47.221944°N 33.876944°E
- Country: Ukraine
- Oblast: Kherson Oblast
- Raion: Beryslav Raion
- Founded: 1780

Area
  - Total: 233 km^{2} (90 sq mi)
- Elevation: 75 m (246 ft)

Population (2001 census)
  - Total: 1,487
  - Density: 6.38/km^{2} (16.5/sq mi)
- Time zone: UTC+2 (EET)
  - Summer (DST): UTC+3 (EEST)
- Postal code: 74232
- Area code: +380 5533

Havrylivka (Ukrainian: Гаврилівка; Russian: Гавриловка) is a village in Beryslav Raion (district) in Kherson Oblast of southern Ukraine, at about 116.1 kilometres (72.1 mi) northeast by east (NEbE) of the centre of Kherson city, on the right (western) bank of the Dnipro river. It belongs to Novooleksandrivka rural hromada, one of the hromadas of Ukraine.

== History ==
Havrylivka was founded in 1780 as the estate of the Russian poet Gavrila Derzhavin. The land was granted to him by Catherine II of Russia. In 1861, after the peasants were released from serfdom, Derzhavin sold the land to the Falz-Fein family. Friedrich von Falz-Fein, the original landowner, released the peasants to freedom soon after. In 1864, the village was moved slightly to the south. The village was later renamed to Falz-Feynovo in the early 1900s, but the Falz-Fein decided to rename the village again due to World War I and the subsequent anti-German sentiments to Derhavino, after the original poet. Sometime later the village name was restored to the original Havrylivka.

In January 1918, the Soviet Union started occupying the village, and a council of peasant deputies was formed. Soviet power was formally established at the end of 1919. During 1928-1929 the small peasant farms were united into collectives, which became the collective farm "Avangard", and in 1932 the collective farm "Comintern" was also started in the village. These two collective farms merged in 1950 to form "Path to Communism", and in the same year the village of Smilnyk was relocated to be merged into the village. The "Path to Communism" farm managed 3,300 hectares of agricultural land and specialized in grain crops and meat-dairy production.

The settlement came under attack by Russian forces during the Russian invasion of Ukraine in 2022 and was regained by Ukrainian forces in the beginning of October the same year.

== Demographics ==
The settlement had 1,487 inhabitants in 2001, native language distribution as of the Ukrainian Census of the same year:

- Ukrainian: 96.02%
- Russian: 3.71%
- Belarusian: 0.20%

== Notable people ==
- Eduard von Falz-Fein (1912–2018), Liechtensteiner businessman
