= Osokorivka, Chernihiv Oblast =

Osokorivka Осокорівка
- Village
- Location within Chernihiv Oblast Location within Ukraine
- Coordinates: 50°50′39″N 31°36′42″E
- Country: Ukraine
- Oblast: Chernihiv Oblast
- Raion: Nizhyn Raion
- Established: 1857

Area
  - Total: 1.52 km^{2} (0.59 sq mi)

Population (2017)
  - Total: 208

Osokorivka (Ukrainian: Осокорівка) is a selo of Nizhyn Raion in Chernihiv Oblast (province) of northern Ukraine. It belongs to Bobrovytsia urban hromada, one of the hromadas of Ukraine.

Until 18 July 2020, Osokorivka belonged to Bobrovytsia Raion. The raion was abolished in July 2020 as part of the administrative reform of Ukraine, which reduced the number of raions of Chernihiv Oblast to five. The area of Bobrovytsia Raion was merged into Nizhyn Raion.
