= Myroliubivka, Beryslav Raion, Kherson Oblast =

Myroliubivka Миролюбівка
- Village
- Location within Kherson Oblast Location within Ukraine
- Coordinates: 47°24′24″N 33°38′56″E
- Country: Ukraine
- Oblast: Kherson Oblast
- Raion: Beryslav Raion

Area
  - Total: 2.9 km^{2} (1.1 sq mi)

Myroliubivka (Ukrainian: Миролю́бівка, pronounced [mɪroˈlʲubiu̯kɐ]) is a village in Beryslav Raion, Ukraine.

== History ==
The village was founded in 1828 as Mala Vorontsovka by the serfs of the landowner family of Vorontsov. Most of the villagers came from Mogilev, Saratov, and Voronezh. During the Russian Empire it was part of the Kherson Governorate in the Novovorontsovka parish. In 1917, it was renamed to Ivanovka due to communization after the Soviet Union took control. After they took control, it became part of the Mykolaiv Oblast, and later the Odessa Oblast. In 1922, a local Komsomol branch was organized in the village, and a village council of poor peasants was created. In 1925, the societies for joint cultivation of the land "Progress" and "Renaissance" were created in the village. They were later merged in 1929 to form the collective farm "Harvest".

During the Great Patriotic War, the village was occupied by German troops from 21 August 1941 to 27 February 1944. Later on, in 1949, the collective farms on the territory of the village merged into one called Chapaev. Chapaev managed 5,300 hectares of agricultural land and specialized in grain production. In 1964, the village was finally renamed to its current name, from Ivanovka to Myroliubivka.

== Russo-Ukraine War ==
In March 2022, as a result of the 2022 Russian invasion of Ukraine, Russia began its occupation of the village. However, Ukraine performed a counteroffensive in early October 2022. President Volodymyr Zelenskyy announced that the armed forces of Ukraine (AFU) liberated the village on 2 October 2022.

== Population ==
Distribution of the population by native language according to the 2001 census:

Language	Percentage
Ukrainian	96.44%
Russian	3.28%
others	0.28%

== Monuments ==
In the center of the village is a monument to the fallen liberator soldiers of the Great Patriotic War, dedicated during Soviet times. Religiously, there is also a Church of Nativity of Saint John the Baptist.
