= Andriivka, Beryslav Raion, Kherson Oblast =

Village in Kherson Oblast, Ukraine

Andriivka Андріївка
- Village
- Interactive map of Andriivka
- Location of Andriivka within Ukraine Andriivka (Ukraine)
- Coordinates: 47°10′37″N 33°02′46″E
- Country: Ukraine
- Oblast: Kherson Oblast
- Raion: Beryslav Raion

Area
  - Total: 0.416 km^{2} (0.161 sq mi)
- Elevation: 24 m (79 ft)

Population (2001 census)
  - Total: 168
  - Density: 404/km^{2} (1,050/sq mi)
- Time zone: UTC+2 (EET)
  - Summer (DST): UTC+3 (EEST)
- Postal code: 74101
- Area code: +380 5532

Andriivka (Ukrainian: Андріївка) is a village in Beryslav Raion, Kherson Oblast, southern Ukraine. It belongs to the Kalynivske settlement hromada, one of the hromadas of Ukraine.

== Administrative status ==
Until 18 July 2020, Andriivka belonged to Velyka Oleksandrivka Raion. The raion was abolished in July 2020 as part of the administrative reform of Ukraine, which reduced the number of raions of Kherson Oblast to five. The area of the Velyka Oleksandrivka Raion was merged into the Beryslav Raion.

== History ==
The village was founded in 1790. Initially, the village was part of Liubomyrivka Volost and was known as Andriivo-Kostiantynivka. During the Great Patriotic War, the village was occupied from 18 August 1941 to 13 March 1944 by German forces. By 1967, the village had a collective farm called Shevchenko, Brigade No. 3 operating in the village.

Andriivka was occupied by Russian forces during the 2022 Russian invasion of Ukraine. On 27 July 2022, the expulsion of Russian occupation forces was announced. The village was destroyed during the battles near the village, with some documents stating the village could not be restored. However, pyrotechnicians were sent out to clear the village of mines.

== Demographics ==
According to the 2001 Ukrainian Census, the only official census taken in post-independence Ukraine, the population of the village was 1,204 people. Of the people residing in the village, their mother tongue is as follows:

Language	Percentage of Population
Ukrainian	91.07%
Russian	7.74%
Other	1.19%

== Monuments ==
There is a memorial to the soldiers who died during World War II located in the village.

== See also ==
- Russian occupation of Kherson Oblast
