= Mylove =

Rural locality in Kherson Oblast, Ukraine

Mylove Милове (Ukrainian)
- Village
- Interactive map of Mylove
- Location within Kherson Oblast Location within Ukraine
- Country: Ukraine
- Oblast: Kherson
- Raion: Beryslav
- Established: 1781

Population
  - Total: 1,071

Mylove (Ukrainian: Милове, pronounced [ˈmɪlowe]; Russian: Мыловое) is a village in Beryslav Raion, within Kherson Oblast, Ukraine. It was established in 1781. Mylove hosts the administration of Mylove rural hromada, one of the hromadas of Ukraine.

== History ==
The village was originally founded in 1781, and in January 1918 came under the control of the Soviet Union. During the Great Patriotic War, 99 residents of the village fought in the war, of whom 47 them were killed. During the construction of the Kakhovka Dam in 1956, part of the original village was flooded. In 1960, a new village was built 1 km northwest of the village, also with the same name of Mylove. During Soviet times, it was the administrative center of its village council, which also governed the nearby villages of Sukhanove and Chervonyi Yar. It was also the site of the Dnipro state farm, which managed 10,700 hectares of agricultural land and specialized in meat-dairy and grain production.

In 2016 parts of the feature film and eventual winner of the Shevchenko National Prize, Volcano, were filmed in the village. Mylove was occupied by the Russian military in early March 2022 during its invasion of Ukraine and was regained by Ukrainian forces on 10 November 2022.

== Demographics ==
According to the 2001 Ukrainian Census, the only official census taken in post-independence Ukraine, the population of the village was 1,071 people. Of the people residing in the village, their mother tongue is as follows:

Language	Percentage of Population
Ukrainian	95.61%
Russian	3.93%
Armenian	0.28%
Romanian	0.09%
Other	0.09%

== Monuments ==
There is a monument located in the village in honor of the fallen soldiers during the Great Patriotic War.

== Notable people ==
- Yakiv Vash (1908-1986), A Ukrainian-Soviet writer
