= Dudchany =

Village in Kherson Oblast, Ukraine

Dudchany Дудчани
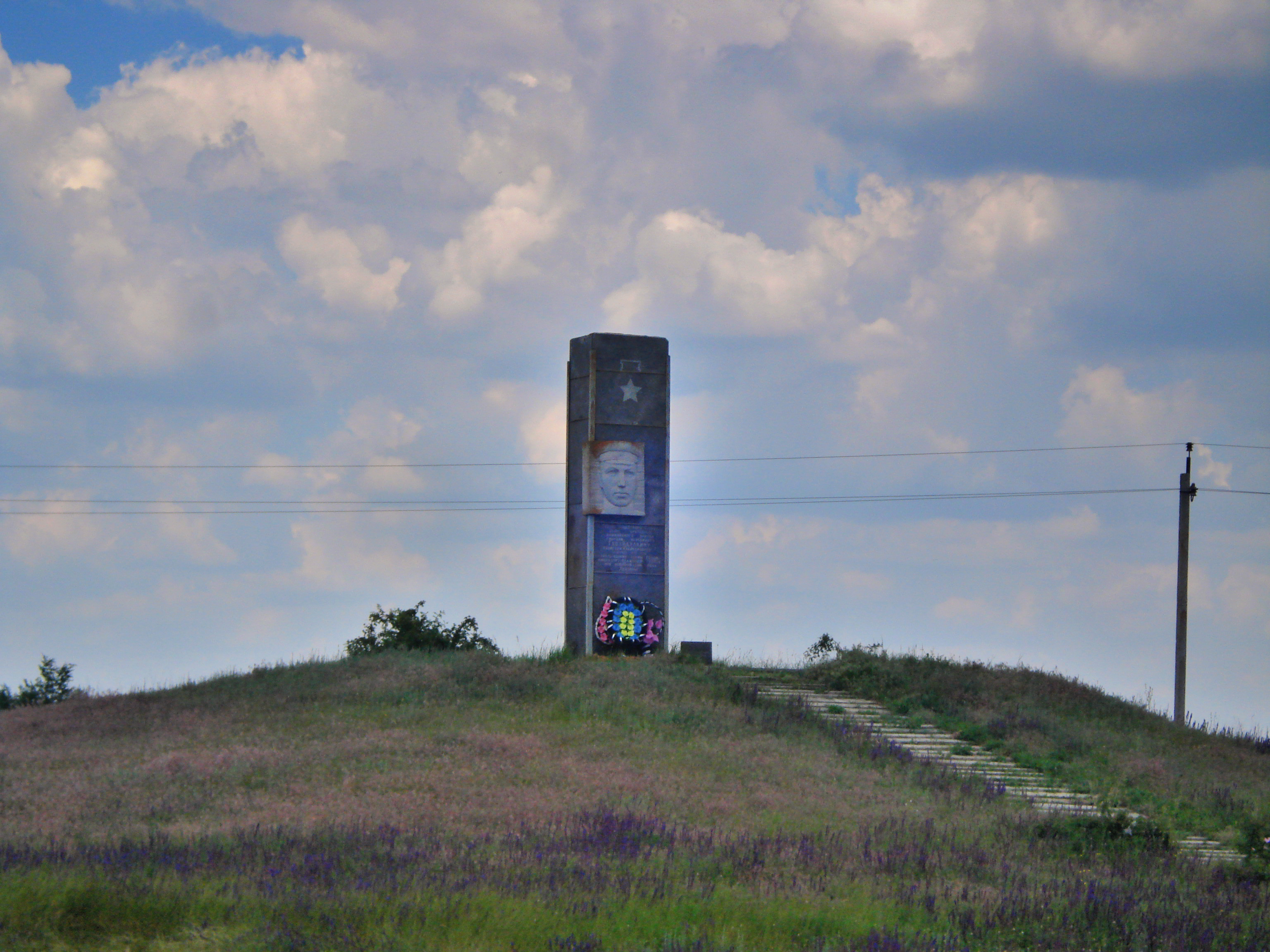
- Monument to Soviet-era hero Minnigali Gubaidullin in Dudchany
- Interactive map of Dudchany
- Coordinates: 47°11′18.2″N 33°46′34″E
- Country: Ukraine
- Oblast: Kherson Oblast
- Raion: Beryslav Raion
- Hromada: Mylove rural hromada
- Founded: 1780

Government
  - Type: Dudchansky village council

Area
  - Total: 396.7 km^{2} (153.2 sq mi)
- Elevation: 74 m (243 ft)

Population (2001)
  - Total: 2,043
  - Density: 5.1/km^{2} (13/sq mi)
- Postal code: 74233
- Area code: 5533
- KOATUU code: 6524181501

Dudchany (Ukrainian: Дудчани, Russian: Дудчаны) is a village located in Beryslav Raion, Kherson Oblast, Ukraine. It is located in the northwest of the oblast on the right bank of the Dnieper. The village had a pre-war population of 2,043 according to the 2001 Ukrainian Census, and was known for its watermelon growing.

During the 2022 Russian Invasion of Ukraine, the village was occupied by Russian forces in their initial advance into the nation in March, where it became utilized as a base and ammunitions depot for the Russian military. During Ukraine's southern counteroffensive, the main northern half of the village was confirmed to be recaptured on 3 October. It would take another month for the southern half of the village to be retaken by Ukrainian forces on 9 November due to the Dudchany Reservoir inlet creating a geographical barrier preventing either side from advancing.

== Geography ==
The village is located on a consistently flat landscape, split partially in half by the Dudchany Reservoir which divides the village into a northern and southern half. The eastern and southeastern part of the village entirely borders Kakhovka Reservoir, part of the Dnieper. Pre-war, the village was primarily agriculture focused, with many long green fields on the outskirts of the village, known for watermelon growing.

== Administrative status ==
Until 18 July 2020, Dudchany belonged to Novovorontsovka Raion. The raion was abolished in July 2020 as part of the administrative reform of Ukraine, which reduced the number of raions of Kherson Oblast to five. The area of Novovorontsovka Raion was merged into Beryslav Raion. The village also belongs to the Mylove rural hromada, one of the 49 hromadas of the oblast.

== 2022 Russian Invasion ==
=== Russian control ===
At the beginning of the 2022 Russian invasion of Ukraine, Dudchany was occupied by Russian troops in their initial advance into Ukraine in March. Russian military bases were established in abandoned homes and municipal buildings while other areas were used as ammunition depots. The village became the command center for the 98th Guards Airborne Division during its occupation by Russian forces.

With the announcement of a possible Ukrainian counteroffensive in the region during the summer, the 83rd Guards Air Assault Brigade was relocated to the village, and paratroopers from the 106th Guards Airborne Division were positioned in the nearby area. On multiple occasions throughout the village's occupation, it was reported that Ukrainian forces targeted these Russian military installations and troop positions; specifically on 26 May, 26 August, 28 August, 15 September, and 21 September.

=== Ukrainian recapture ===
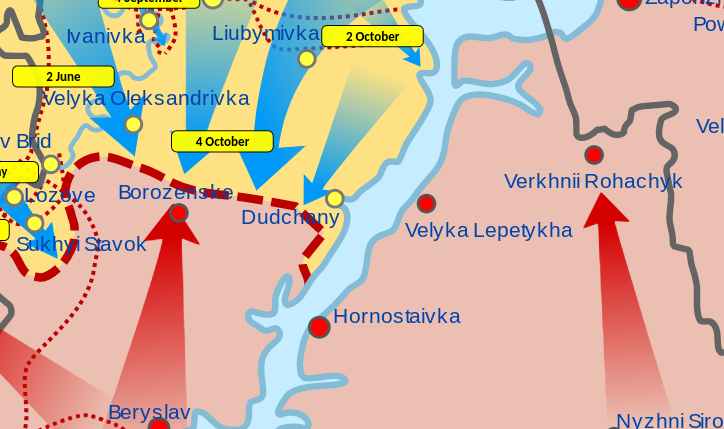
A map showing Ukrainian troops advance into Dudchany in early October.

According to the Russian-installed head of the Kherson region Vladimir Saldo in an interview conducted on 3 October 2022 and published the following day, the Ukrainian armed forces reached the outskirts of Dudchany in part of their southern counteroffensive in an approximately 30 km (20 miles) push from the previous front line. Reports from some of Dudchany's residents though reported that the Russian retreat from the village began as early as 1 October. Prominent Russian military blogger Rybar reported that Russian troops in Dudchany were "[under] the threat of the physical encirclement" when the "decision was made to withdraw the contingent of the Russian armed forces to a new line of defence".

The following day on 4 October 2022, Saldo stated that the village had been taken by Ukrainian troops, followed by an update by the Russian Defence Ministry to their maps to show that the Russian army was no longer in control of the village. The Ukrainian soldiers entering the village were warmly welcomed by some of the village's residents who baked goods for them and shouted "Glory to Ukraine!", "Glory to the Heroes!", and "death to the Russians". In the Russian retreat, Ukrainian forces also captured a Strela-10 anti-aircraft missile system in the area around the village.

==== Southern Dudchany ====
The southern outskirts of the village remained disputed or fully Russian-occupied even after Ukraine's southern counteroffensive in early October. This was in part because of the geography of the village, which has a small inlet separating southern Dudchany from the main northern half. The situation remained like this until 9 November 2022, when several videos and a statement from the leader of Dudchany Alla Torchanska confirmed that southern Dudchany had been fully recaptured by Ukrainian forces as part of Russia's withdrawal from the west bank of the Dnieper river from 9 to 11 November.

=== Post Ukrainian recapture ===
Shortly after the Ukrainian recapture on 3 October, Russian forces heavily shelled the village which shut off the electricity and hot water there, which combined prompted many of the remaining residents to leave. Ukrainian forces have since used the village to launch attacks on the nearby Russian held positions. In retaliation, a suicide drone attack was carried out on the village by Russian forces on 10 October, in which no significant losses were reported. It was further reported that Russian forces shelled Dudchany from the east bank of the Dnieper on 23 November, 27 November, 3 December, 6 December, 11 December, 1 January 2023, 5 January, 9 January, 10 January, and 11 January.

== Demographics ==
=== Population ===
| Year | Population |
|---|---|
| 1989 | 2,222 |
| 2001 | 2,043 |

=== Gender ===
| | 1989 |
|---|---|
| Male | 1,026 |
| Female | 1,196 |

=== Languages ===
| | 2001 |
|---|---|
| Ukrainian | 95.91% |
| Russian | 2.81% |
| Armenian | 0.62% |
| Moldovan (Romanian) | 0.19% |
| Gagauz | 0.10% |
| Belarusian | 0.05% |
| Others | 0.32% |

== See also ==
- Russian occupation of Kherson Oblast
