= Zolota Balka =

Village in Kherson Oblast, Ukraine

Zolota Balka Золота Балка
- Village
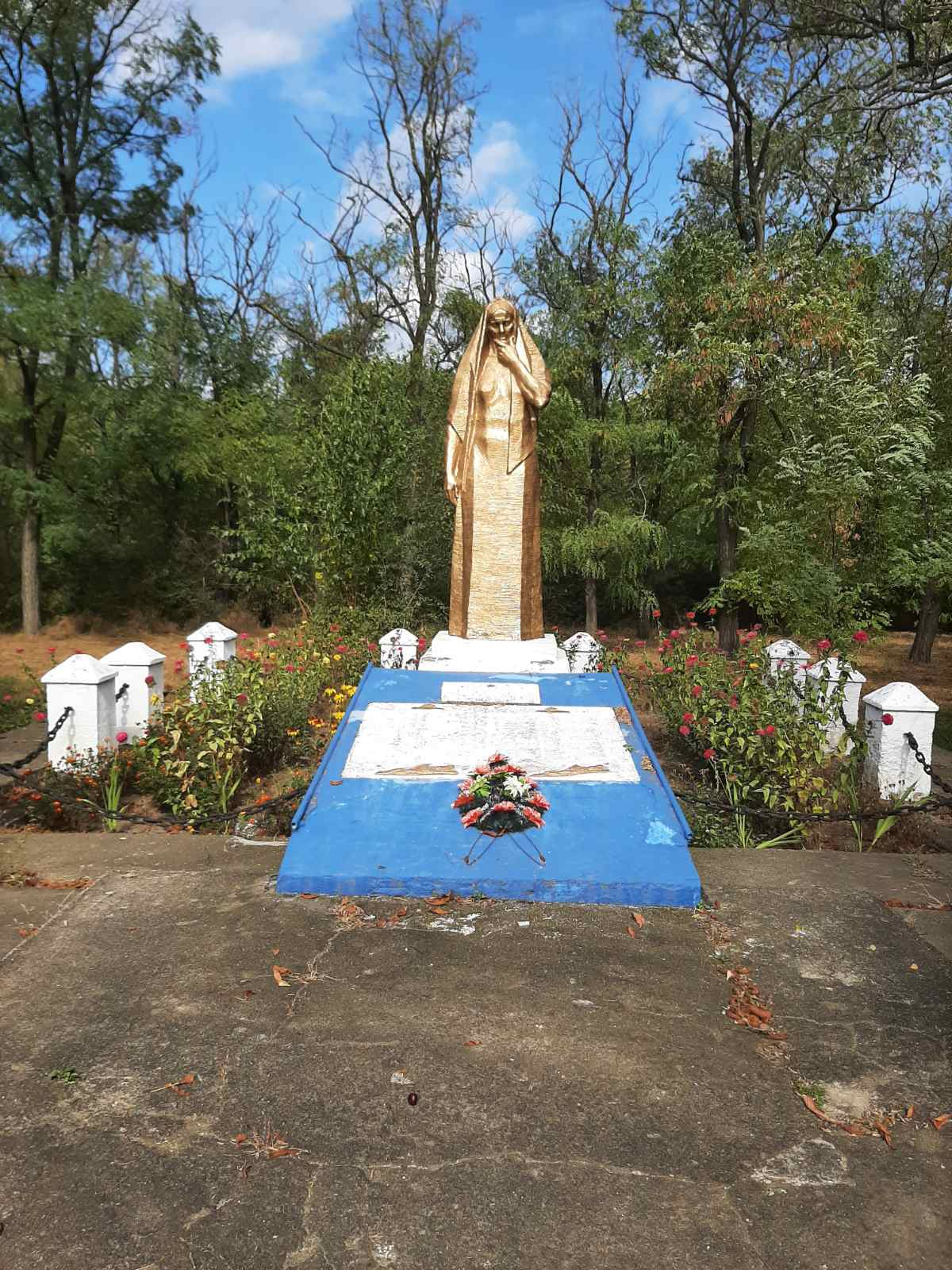
- A monument dedicated in honor of the fellow soldiers from the village.

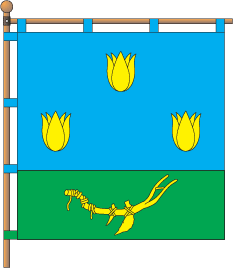
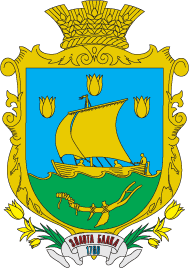
- Flag Coat of arms
- Interactive map of Zolota Balka
- Zolota Balka in Kherson Oblast Zolota Balka (Ukraine)
- Coordinates: 47.379722°N 33.958889°E
- Country: Ukraine
- Oblast: Kherson Oblast
- Raion: Beryslav Raion
- Founded: 1780

Area
  - Total: 285.6 km^{2} (110.3 sq mi)
- Elevation: 86 m (282 ft)

Population (2001 census)
  - Total: 1,681
  - Density: 5.886/km^{2} (15.24/sq mi)
- Time zone: UTC+2 (EET)
  - Summer (DST): UTC+3 (EEST)
- Postal code: 74214
- Area code: +380 5533

Zolota Balka (Ukrainian: Золота Балка; Russian: Золотая Балка) is a village in Beryslav Raion (district) in Kherson Oblast of southern Ukraine, at about 132.6 kilometres (82.4 mi) northeast by east from the centre of Kherson city, on the right bank of the Dnipro river, on the western bank of the Kakhovka Reservoir. It belongs to the Novooleksandrivka rural hromada, one of the hromadas of Ukraine.

== History ==
An ancient settlement with remains of stone buildings and traces of iron production was excavated in the area between 1951 and 1955 by M. Vyazmitina. It was a major centre of trade and crafts in the Lower Dnieper area, supporting commercial ties with Olbia and the Crimea.

The village was formally founded in 1780, and by 1898 it belonged to the landowner Izmailova. The following year, it came into the possession of Princess Svtopolk-Mirska. In January 1918, the Soviet Union took over the village. For a brief time during World War I the village was occupied by Austro-German troops, and then it was occupied by troops of the White Movement, Anton Denikin, during the Russian Civil War. The first joint cultivation society was formed in August 1924, and in 1928 a fishing artel was created along with a collective farm. During the Great Patriotic War, the village was occupied by German troops from 23 August 1941 to 27 February 1944.

During the 1951 Polish–Soviet territorial exchange, residents of the village Krywka were resettled into the territory of Zolota Balka. The following year, a few of the villages near the village were incorporated into it.

Until 18 July 2020, Zolota Balka belonged to Novovorontsovka Raion. The raion was abolished in July 2020 as part of the administrative reform of Ukraine, which reduced the number of raions of Kherson Oblast to five. The area of Novovorontsovka Raion was merged into Beryslav Raion.

The settlement came under attack by Russian forces during the Russian invasion of Ukraine in 2022 and was regained by Ukrainian forces in the beginning of October the same year.

== Demographics ==
The settlement had 1681 inhabitants in 2001, native language distribution as of the Ukrainian Census of the same year:

- Ukrainian: 96.19%
- Russian: 3.45%
- Belarusian: 0.30%
