= List of villages in Kherson Oblast =

This is a list of villages in Kherson Oblast in Ukraine categorised by Raion.

== Beryslav Raion ==
- Andriivka
- Bilohirka
- Bilyayivka
- Borozenske
- Bruskynske
- Burhunka
- Davydiv Brid
- Dobryanka
- Dudchany
- Havrylivka
- Khreshchenivka
- Kostromka
- Liubymivka
- Lozove
- Mylove
- Myroliubivka
- Novohrednyeve
- Novooleksandrivka
- Novopetrivka
- Novoraisk
- Novovoznesenske
- Olhyne
- Osokorivka
- Petropavlivka
- Sukhyi Stavok
- Trudolyubivka
- Tryfonivka
- Tyahynka
- Ukrainka
- Vysoke
- Zelenyi Hai
- Zmitivka
- Zolota Balka

== Henichesk Raion ==
- Chonhar
- Henicheska Hirka
- Hornostaivka
- Shchaslyvtseve
- Sokolohirne
- Strillkove
- Syvash
- Zelenyi Hai

== Kakhovka Raion ==
- Babyne
- Hryhorivka
- Khrestivka
- Kostiantynivka
- Rubanivka
- Tavrychanka
- Zelenyi Pid

== Kherson Raion ==
- Barvinok
- Blahodatne
- Chornobaivka
- Darivka
- Inhulivka
- Kyselivka
- Muzykivka
- Nizhnyi Rohachyk
- Oleksandrivka
- Pody
- Posad-Pokrovske
- Pravdyne
- Sahy
- Soldatske
- Solontsi
- Stanislav
- Tavriyske
- Yuvileine
- Zelenyi Hai

== Skadovsk Raion ==
- Bilenke
- Chulakivka
- Hladkivka, Skladovsk Raion
- Zaliznyi Port
