= Arkhanhelske, Kherson Oblast =

Rural locality in Kherson Oblast, Ukraine

Arkhanhelske Архангельське
- Rural settlement
- Interactive map of Arkhanhelske
- Location within Kherson Oblast Location within Ukraine
- Coordinates: 47°26′02″N 33°24′13″E
- Country: Ukraine
- Oblast: Kherson Oblast
- Raion: Beryslav Raion
- Hromada: Vysokopillia settlement hromada

Population (2022)
  - Total: ▼1,731
- Time zone: UTC+2 (EET)
  - Summer (DST): UTC+3 (EEST)

Arkhanhelske (Ukrainian: Архангельське; Russian: Архангельское) is a rural settlement in Beryslav Raion, Kherson Oblast, Ukraine. It is located on the left bank of the Inhulets, a tributary of the Dnieper. Arkhanhelske belongs to Vysokopillia settlement hromada, one of the hromadas of Ukraine. It has a population of 1,731 (2022 estimate).

== History ==
Until 18 July 2020, Arkhanhelske belonged to Vysokopillia Raion. The raion was abolished in July 2020 as part of the administrative reform of Ukraine, which reduced the number of raions of Kherson Oblast to five. The area of Vysokopillia Raion was merged into Beryslav Raion.

Until 26 January 2024, Arkhanhelske was designated urban-type settlement. On this day, a new law entered into force which abolished this status, and Arkhanhelske became a rural settlement.

== Demographics ==
As of the 2001 Ukrainian census, Arkhanhelske had a population of 2,253 inhabitants. The linguistic composition of the settlement's population was as follows:

Native languages in Arkhanhelske
	percent
Ukrainian	97.2%
Russian	2.2%
Romanian	0.3%
Belarusian	0.1%
others	0.2%

== Economy ==
=== Transportation ===
The closest railway station, about 5 kilometres (3.1 mi) southeast of the settlement, is Blakytne, on the railway connecting Apostolove and Snihurivka, where it has further connections to Kherson and Mykolaiv. There is infrequent passenger traffic.

Arkhanhelske is connected by road with Beryslav via Velyka Oleksandrivka and with Nikopol via Novovorontsovka.

== See also ==
- Russian occupation of Kherson Oblast
