= Kalynivske, Kherson Oblast =

Rural locality in Kherson Oblast, Ukraine

Kalynivske Калинівське
- Rural settlement
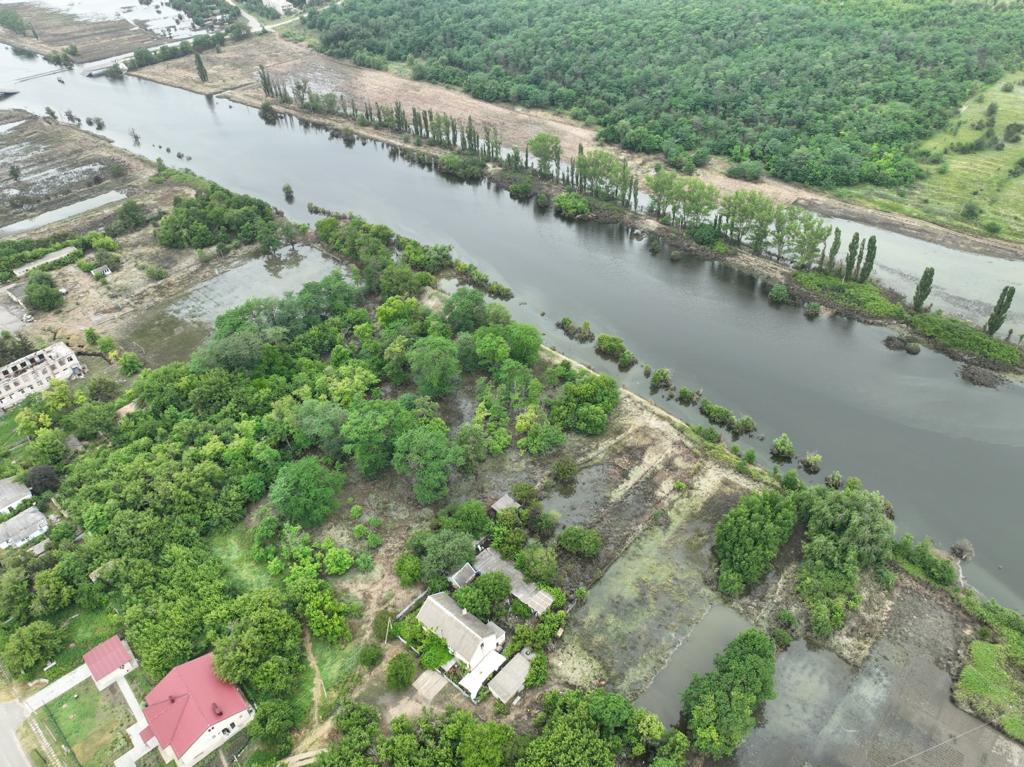

- Location in Kherson Oblast Location in Ukraine
- Country: Ukraine
- Oblast: Kherson Oblast
- Raion: Beryslav Raion
- Hromada: Kalynivske settlement hromada

Population (2022)
  - Total: ▼1,057
- Time zone: UTC+2 (EET)
  - Summer (DST): UTC+3 (EEST)

Kalynivske (Ukrainian: Калинівське; Russian: Калиновское; Yiddish: שדה־מנוחה) is a rural settlement in Beryslav Raion, Kherson Oblast, Ukraine. It is located on the left bank of the Inhulets River, a right tributary of the Dnieper. Kalynivske hosts the administration of Kalynivske settlement hromada, one of the hromadas of Ukraine. It has a population of 1,057 (2022 estimate).

== History ==
The place was settled in 1807 as a Jewish agricultural colony Seydemenukha (Hebrew: שדה מנוחה) by Jewish population from the gubernias of Chernigov, Mogilev, and Vitebsk. Seydemenukha means a quiet field.

Before 2016, the settlement was known as Kalininske, after Mikhail Kalinin. On 17 March 2016 that the Verkhovna Rada adopted the resolution to rename Kalininske as Kalynivske and conform to the law prohibiting names of Communist origin.

Until 18 July 2020, Kalynivske belonged to Velyka Oleksandrivka Raion. The raion was abolished in July 2020 as part of the administrative reform of Ukraine, which reduced the number of raions of Kherson Oblast to five. The area of Velyka Oleksandrivka Raion was merged into Beryslav Raion.

Kalynivske was occupied by the Russian forces during the beginning of the Russian invasion of Ukraine in February 2022. On 9 November 2022, it was reported that Ukrainian forces had re-entered Kalynivske.

Until 26 January 2024, Kalynivske was designated urban-type settlement. On this day, a new law entered into force which abolished this status, and Kalynivske became a rural settlement.

== Economy ==
=== Transportation ===
Kalinindorf railway station, approximately 10 kilometres (6.2 mi) north, is on the railway connecting Kherson and Apostolove via Snihurivka. There is infrequent passenger traffic.

The settlement is connected by road with Snihurivka and Velyka Oleksandrivka with further connections to Kherson, Mykolaiv, and Kryvyi Rih.

== See also ==
- Kalinine, Krasnohvardiiske Raion
