= Vysokopillia =

Rural locality in Kherson Oblast, Ukraine

Vysokopillia Високопілля
- Rural settlement
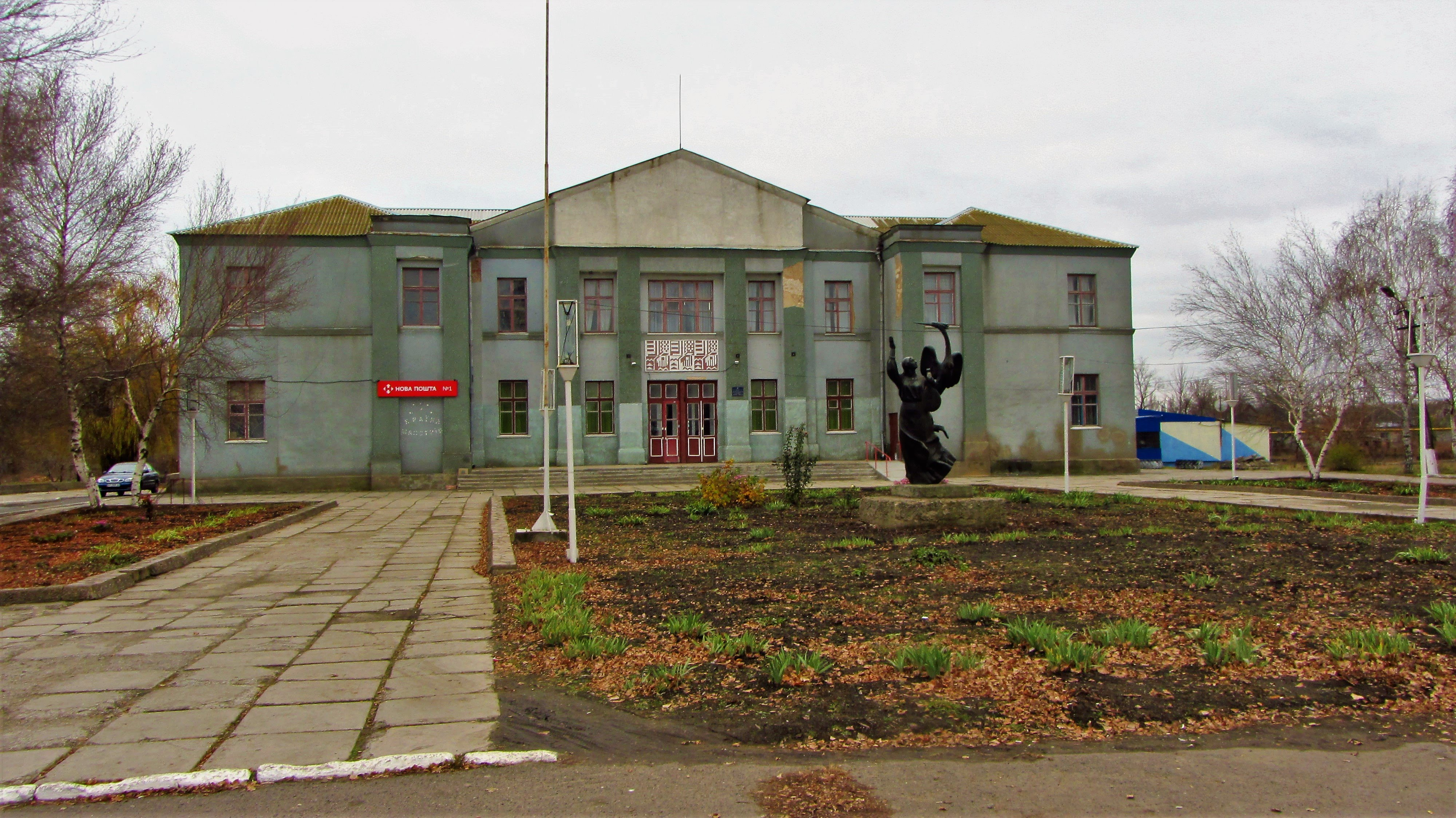

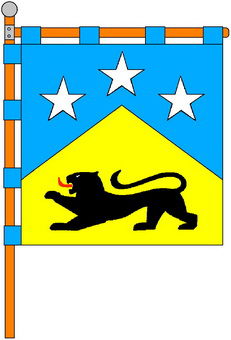
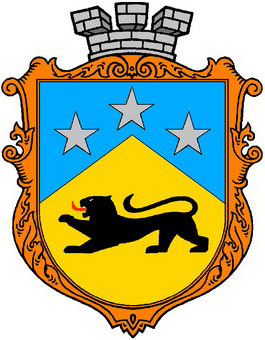
- Flag Coat of arms
- Interactive map of Vysokopillia
- Location within Kherson Oblast Location within Ukraine
- Coordinates: 47°29′39″N 33°31′58″E
- Country: Ukraine
- Oblast: Kherson Oblast
- Raion: Beryslav Raion
- Hromada: Vysokopillia settlement hromada
- Time zone: UTC+2 (EET)
  - Summer (DST): UTC+3 (EEST)
- KATOTTH: UA65020070010049455

Vysokopillia or Vysokopillya (Ukrainian: Високопілля, pronounced [wɪsokoˈpilʲːɐ]; Russian: Высокополье, romanized: Vysokopol'ye) is a rural settlement in Beryslav Raion, Kherson Oblast, southern Ukraine. It hosts the administration of Vysokopillia settlement hromada, one of the hromadas of Ukraine. Vysokopillia is located between the valleys of the Dnieper and Inhulets rivers, 12 kilometres (7.5 mi) east of the Inhulets. It has a population of 3,801 (2022 estimate).

== History ==
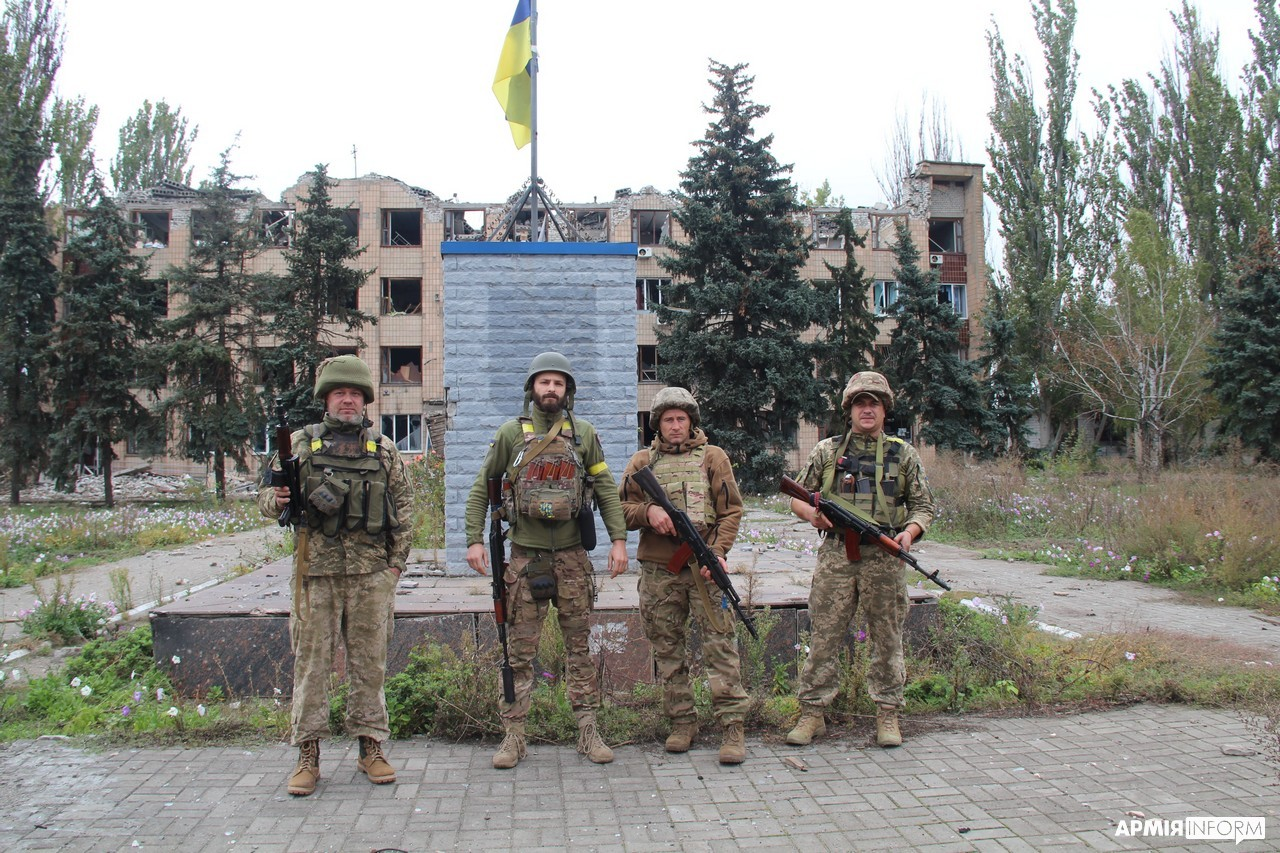
Ukrainian soldiers in reclaimed Vysokopillia in September 2022 during the 2022 Kherson counteroffensive

Vysokopillia was founded as a German colony between 1869 and 1870 (see de:Kolonie Kronau for more information).

Until 18 July 2020, Vysokopillia was the administrative centre of Vysokopillia Raion. The raion was abolished in July 2020 as part of the administrative reform of Ukraine, which reduced the number of raions of Kherson Oblast to five. The area of Vysokopillia Raion was merged into Beryslav Raion.

The settlement was occupied by Russian forces on 16 March 2022. The Armed Forces of Ukraine recaptured Vysokopillia on 4 September and hoisted the Ukrainian flag near Vysokopillia's hospital as part the 2022 Ukrainian southern counteroffensive. Due to the military fights the settlement was destroyed by ~80%.

Until 26 January 2024, Vysokopillia was designated urban-type settlement. On this day, a new law entered into force which abolished this status, and Vysokopillia became a rural settlement.

== Demographics ==
As of 2001, the settlement had a population of 4,699. The linguistic composition was:

Native languages in Vysokopillia
Languages	percent
Ukrainian	93.3%
Russian	6.1%
Moldovan	0.2%
Belarusian	0.1%
Armenian	0.1%

== Economy ==
=== Transportation ===
Vysokopillia is on a paved road which connects Novovorontsovka and Beryslav, where it has access to Kherson.

Vysokopillia railway station is on the railway line connecting Apostolove and Snihurivka (with further connection to Kherson and Mykolaiv).

== See also ==
- Battle of Kherson
- 2022 Ukrainian southern counteroffensive
