= Ukrainka, Kherson Oblast =

Village in Kherson Oblast, Ukraine

Ukrainka Українка
- Village
- Interactive map of Ukrainka
- Location of Ukrainka within Ukraine Ukrainka (Ukraine)
- Coordinates: 47.323056°N 33.782778°E
- Country: Ukraine
- Oblast: Kherson Oblast
- Raion: Beryslav Raion

Area
  - Total: 113.9 km^{2} (44.0 sq mi)
- Elevation: 79 m (259 ft)

Population (2001 census)
  - Total: 313
  - Density: 2.75/km^{2} (7.12/sq mi)
- Time zone: UTC+2 (EET)
  - Summer (DST): UTC+3 (EEST)
- Postal code: 74222
- Area code: +380 5533

Ukrainka (Ukrainian: Українка; Russian: Украинка; until 1958, Khrushchevo (Хрущево)) is a village in Beryslav Raion, Kherson Oblast, southern Ukraine, about 121.8 kilometres (75.7 mi) northeast from the centre of Kherson city. It belongs to Novooleksandrivka rural hromada, one of the hromadas of Ukraine.

== History ==
From 20 August 1941 to 20 February 1944 the village was occupied by German forces during the Great Patriotic War. Until 1958, the village was named Khrushchevo after First Secretary Nikita Khrushchev, but alongside the Khrushcivska Village Council, which became Novooleksandrivka, everything was renamed.

Until 18 July 2020, Ukrainka belonged to Novovorontsovka Raion. The raion was abolished in July 2020 as part of the administrative reform of Ukraine, which reduced the number of raions of Kherson Oblast to five. The area of Novovorontsovka Raion was merged into Beryslav Raion.

The village came under attack by Russian forces in 2022, during the Russian invasion of Ukraine, and was regained by Ukrainian forces in the beginning of October. However, the village was still shelled by the Russian Army in March 2025 with MLRS, and FPV drone strikes have also destroyed much of the village. The current Village Head for the Village Council, including Ukrainka, is Oleksandr Yakovych Levechko.

== Demographics ==
The settlement had 313 inhabitants in 2001. The native language distribution as of the Ukrainian Census of 2001 was:

- Ukrainian: 92.97%
- Russian: 3.83%
- Moldovan (Romanian): 3.19%

In the last census taken in the Ukrainian SSR before Ukrainka became part of modern-day Ukraine, the 1989 census recorded that the village's population was 338 people.
