= Kostromka =

Village in Kherson Oblast, Ukraine

Kostromka Костромка
- Village
- Interactive map of Kostromka
- Location of Kostromka within Ukraine Kostromka (Ukraine)
- Coordinates: 47.138056°N 33.149722°E
- Country: Ukraine
- Oblast: Kherson Oblast
- Raion: Beryslav Raion
- Established: 1903

Area
  - Total: 1.278 km^{2} (0.493 sq mi)
- Elevation: 66 m (217 ft)

Population (2001 census)
  - Total: 181
  - Density: 142/km^{2} (367/sq mi)
- Time zone: UTC+2 (EET)
  - Summer (DST): UTC+3 (EEST)
- Postal code: 74121
- Area code: +380 5532

Kostromka (Ukrainian: Костромка; Russian: Костромка) is a village in Beryslav Raion (district) in Kherson Oblast of southern Ukraine, at about 75.6 kilometres (47.0 mi) northeast by north from the centre of Kherson city.

== History ==
The village was founded by Russian Old Believers who were Nekrasov Cossacks, who had fled from persecution in their homeland. The name of the village comes from the Kostroma River, which is named after the river with the same name in Russia.

On 19 July 2020, as a result of administrative-territorial reform and the liquidation of the Velyka Oleksandrivka Raion, the village was incorporated into the Beryslav Raion. The village came under attack by Russian forces in 2022, during the Russian invasion of Ukraine. On 10 November 2022 the village was liberated by Ukrainian troops during the Kherson counteroffensive, and the Russian Ministry of Defense later confirmed the occupiers had transferred their troops to the left bank of the Dnieper. Since then, it has been repeatedly been hit by missile and air strikes.

== Demographics ==
According to the 2001 Ukrainian Census, the only official census taken in post-independence Ukraine, the population of the village was 1,204 people. Of the people residing in the village, their mother tongue is as follows:

Language	Percentage of Population
Ukrainian	95.58%
Russian	3.31%
Moldovan (Romanian language)	1.11%
