= Inhulivka =

Village in Kherson Oblast, Ukraine

Inhulivka Інгулівка
- Village
- Interactive map of Inhulivka
- Location of Inhulivka Inhulivka (Ukraine)
- Coordinates: 46°54′21″N 32°56′40″E
- Country: Ukraine
- Oblast: Kherson Oblast
- Raion: Kherson Raion
- Hromada: Darivka rural hromada

Area
  - Total: 1.07 km^{2} (0.41 sq mi)

Population
  - Total: 274
  - Density: 256/km^{2} (663/sq mi)
- Time zone: UTC+2 (EET)
  - Summer (DST): UTC+3 (EEST)

Inhulivka (Ukrainian: Інгулівка) is a village in Kherson Raion, within Kherson Oblast, Ukraine. It belongs to Darivka rural hromada, one of the hromadas of Ukraine. According to the 2001 Ukrainian census, the last official census taken in Ukraine, the population of the village was 274 people. It also has an area of 0.886 km2.

== History ==
During the Great Patriotic War, the village was occupied by German troops from 28 August 1941 to 13 March 1944, when it was taken over again by the Soviets. Until 1946, the village was named Plot 11 (участок 11). It was renamed on 15 April 1946 by decree of the Verkhovna Rada of the Ukrainian SSR in order to standardize its toponymy, as Plot 11 was not a proper settlement name and was instead a survey designation during land allotments.

Until 18 July 2020, Inhulivka belonged to Beryslav Raion. As part of the 2020 administrative reform of Ukraine, which reduced the number of raions of Kherson Oblast to five, it was moved into Kherson Raion.

From 25 February 2022, the village was under Russian Occupation. On 11 November Armed Forces of Ukraine (AFU/ZSU) liberated the village.

== Demographics ==
According to the 2001 Ukrainian Census, the only official census taken in post-independence Ukraine, the population of the village was 274 people. Of the people residing in the village, their mother tongue is as follows:

Language	Percentage of Population
Ukrainian	95.99%
Russian	2.55%
Other	1.46%
