= Novohrednieve =

Village in Kherson Oblast, Ukraine

Novohrednyeve Новогреднєве
- Village
- Interactive map of Novohrednyeve
- Location of Novohredneve in Kherson Oblast Novohrednyeve (Ukraine)
- Coordinates: 47.1525°N 33.001389°E
- Country: Ukraine
- Oblast: Kherson Oblast
- Raion: Beryslav Raion
- Founded: 1898

Area
  - Total: 0.625 km^{2} (0.241 sq mi)
- Elevation: 3 m (9.8 ft)

Population (2001 census)
  - Total: 212
  - Density: 339/km^{2} (879/sq mi)
- Time zone: UTC+2 (EET)
  - Summer (DST): UTC+3 (EEST)
- Postal code: 74101
- Area code: +380 5532

Novohrednyeve (Ukrainian: Новогреднєве; Russian: Новогреднево) is a village in Beryslav Raion (district) in Kherson Oblast of southern Ukraine, at about 63.9 kilometres (39.7 mi) northeast by north (NEbN) of the centre of Kherson city. It belongs to Kalynivske settlement hromada, one of the hromadas of Ukraine. As of 2025, the village occupies an area of 0.625 km2.

== History ==
The village was founded in 1898. During the Great Patriotic War, the village was occupied by German troops from 18 August 1941 to 13 March 1944.

The settlement came under attack by Russian forces during the Russian invasion of Ukraine in 2022 and was regained by Ukrainian forces by the middle of September the same year. Due to the Russian destruction of Kakhovka Dam, the village was heavily flooded, with no water supply being in place. By the end of June 2023, it lasted as one of three villages on the right bank of the Dnieper to still remain partially flooded.

=== Administrative status ===
On 12 June 2020, in accordance with an Order of the Cabinet of Ministers, the village became part of the Kalynivske hromada. On 19 July 2020 as a result of administrative-territorial reform and the liquidation of the Velyka Oleksandrivka Raion, the village was incorporated into the Beryslav Raion.

As of 2025, the village occupies an area of 0.625 km2.

== Demographics ==
The settlement had 212 inhabitants in 2001, native language distribution as of the Ukrainian Census of the same year:

- Ukrainian: 97.67%
- Russian: 1.86%
- Belarusian: 0.47%
