= Bila Krynytsia, Kherson Oblast =

Rural locality in Kherson Oblast, Ukraine

Bila Krynytsia Біла Криниця
- Rural settlement
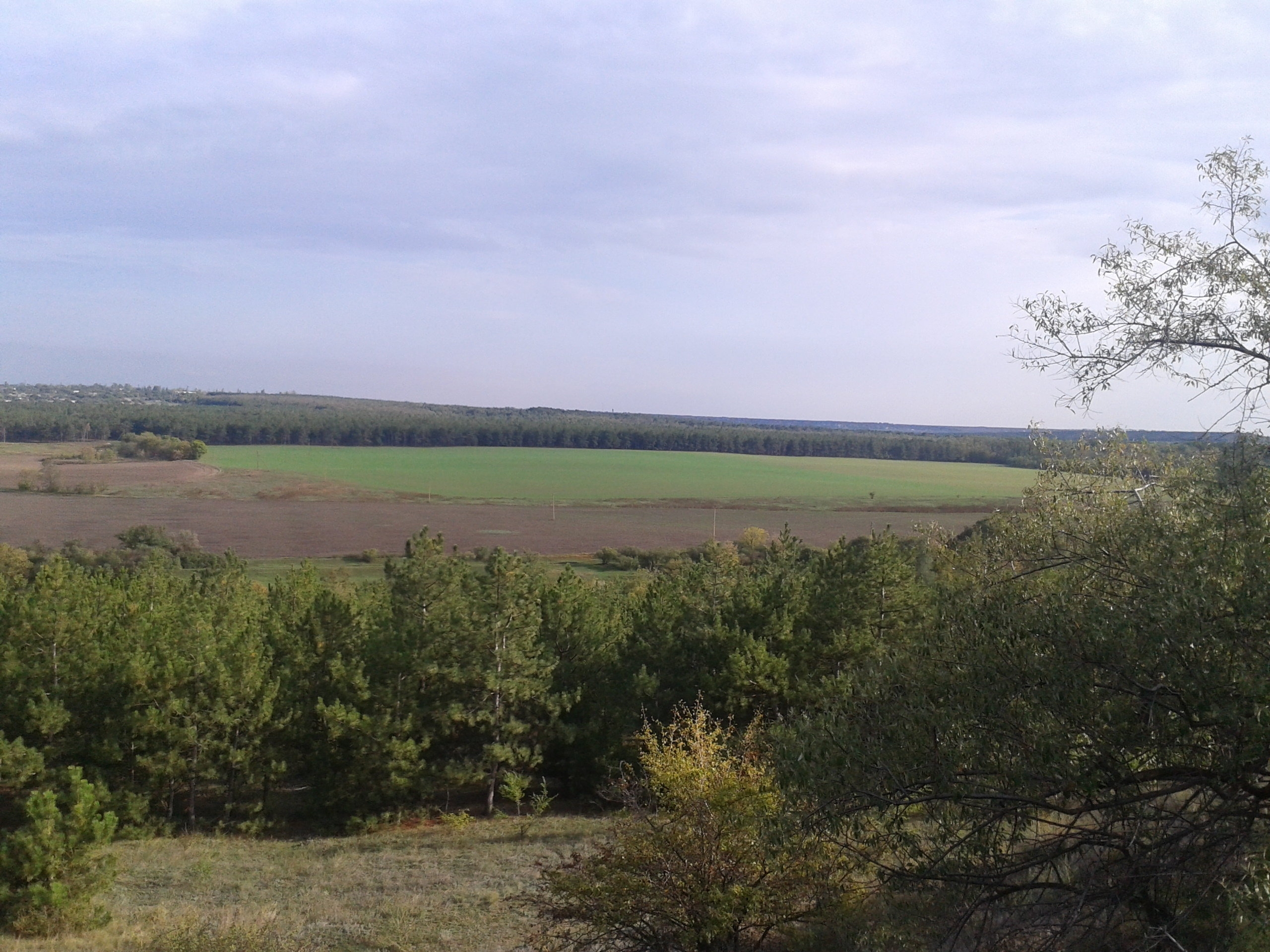
- Landscape of Bila Krynytsia

- Location within Kherson Oblast Location within Ukraine
- Country: Ukraine
- Oblast: Kherson Oblast
- Raion: Beryslav Raion
- Hromada: Velyka Oleksandrivka settlement hromada
- Founded: 1914

Government
  - Type: Velyka Oleksandrivka Settlement Council

Area
  - Total: 3 km^{2} (1.2 sq mi)
- Elevation: 14 m (46 ft)

Population (2022)
  - Total: 1,149 ▼
  - Density: 380/km^{2} (990/sq mi)
- Time zone: UTC+2 (EET)
  - Summer (DST): UTC+3 (EEST)
- Postal code: 74112
- Area code: +380 5532

Bila Krynytsia (Ukrainian: Біла Криниця; Russian: Белая Криница) is a rural settlement in Beryslav Raion, Kherson Oblast, southern Ukraine. It is located in the steppe between the Inhulets and the Vysun rivers, mid-distance between Kherson and Kryvyi Rih. Bila Krynytsia belongs to Velyka Oleksandrivka settlement hromada, one of the hromadas of Ukraine. It has a population of 1,149 (2022 estimate).

== History ==
Until 18 July 2020, Bila Krynytsia belonged to Velyka Oleksandrivka Raion. The raion was abolished in July 2020 as part of the administrative reform of Ukraine, which reduced the number of raions of Kherson Oblast to five. The area of Velyka Oleksandrivka Raion was merged into Beryslav Raion.

Until 26 January 2024, Bila Krynytsia was designated urban-type settlement. On this day, a new law entered into force which abolished this status, and Bila Krynytsia became a rural settlement.

== Transportation ==
The Bila Krynytsia railway station in the settlement serves as an intermediate railway station of the Dubka—Snihurivka line between the Novodmytrivskyi junction (11 km) and Lepetykha stopping point (12 km).

== Russo-Ukrainian War ==
During the Russian invasion of Ukraine in 2022, Bila Krynytsia was located behind Russian lines, but never came under Russian occupation. The settlement was recaptured by Ukrainian forces sometime in early June, but became one of the new settlements on the frontline in doing so. This situation made it vulnerable to bombardment by Russian tanks, mortars, and artillery, where it was often attacked throughout July, August, and September. Bila Krynytsia and other nearby settlements were largely relieved of these attacks during Ukraine's southern counteroffensive on 3 October, which moved the frontline approximately 30 km (20 miles) from where it previously was.

At 16:00 on 12 May, a 200-vehicle convoy of evacuating Ukrainian civilians from occupied territory in the Kherson region was struck by Russian artillery outside of the settlement, according to a telegram made by the head of Kryvyi Rih's military administration Oleksandr Vilkul. The attack injured several, including a child, who were treated for their injuries at a hospital in Kryvyi Rih.

== See also ==
- Russian occupation of Kherson Oblast
