= Velyka Oleksandrivka =

Rural locality in Kherson Oblast, Ukraine

Velyka Oleksandrivka Велика Олександрівка
- Rural settlement
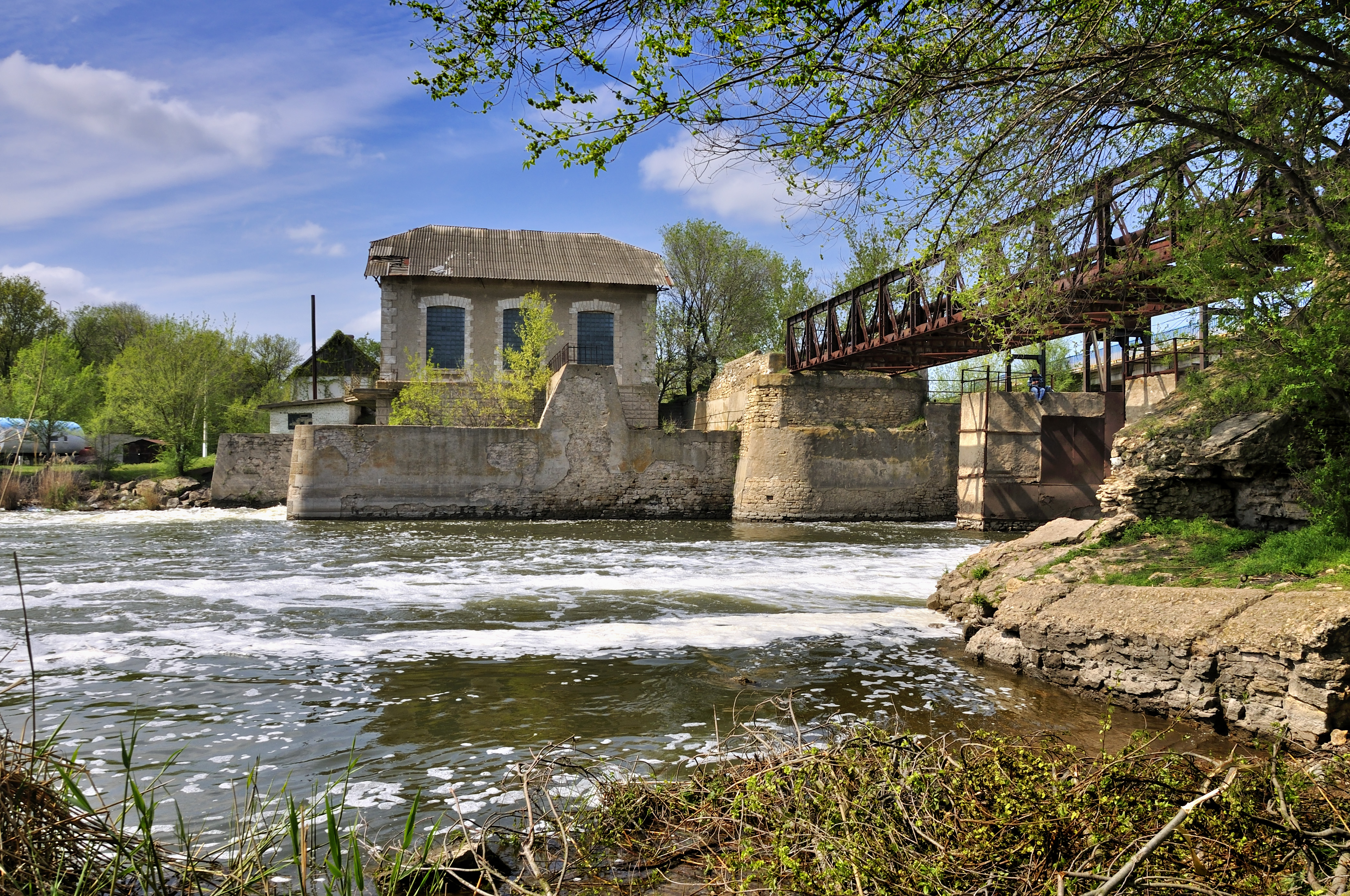
- Old hydroelectric power station in Velyka Oleksandrivka

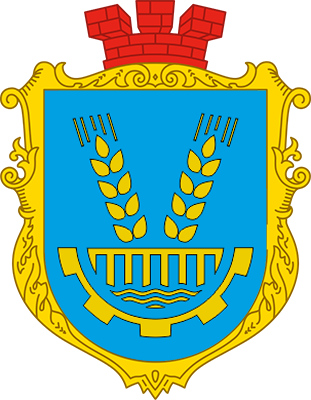
- Coat of arms

- Location within Kherson Oblast Location within Ukraine
- Coordinates: 47°19′29″N 33°18′42″E
- Country: Ukraine
- Oblast: Kherson Oblast
- Raion: Beryslav Raion
- Hromada: Velyka Oleksandrivka settlement hromada

Population (2022)
  - Total: ▼6,334
- Time zone: UTC+2 (EET)
  - Summer (DST): UTC+3 (EEST)

Velyka Oleksandrivka (Ukrainian: Велика Олександрівка; Russian: Большая Александровка, romanized: Bolshaya Aleksandrovka or Великая Александровка, Velikaya Aleksandrovka) is a rural settlement in Beryslav Raion, Kherson Oblast, southern Ukraine. It hosts the administration of Velyka Oleksandrivka settlement hromada, one of the hromadas of Ukraine. The settlement is located on the left bank of the Inhulets. It has a population of 6,334 (2022 estimate).

== History ==
Until 18 July 2020, Velyka Oleksandrivka was the administrative center of Velyka Oleksandrivka Raion. The raion was abolished in July 2020 as part of the administrative reform of Ukraine, which reduced the number of raions of Kherson Oblast to five. The area of Velyka Oleksandrivka Raion was merged into Beryslav Raion.

Until 26 January 2024, Velyka Oleksandrivka was designated urban-type settlement. On this day, a new law entered into force which abolished this status, and Velyka Oleksandrivka became a rural settlement.

=== 2022 Russian invasion of Ukraine ===
Russian forces occupied Velyka Oleksandrivka on 10 March 2022, telling locals that they were planning to advance on Kryvyi Rih.

On 4 October 2022, Ukrainian authorities regained control of the settlement as part of a counteroffensive in the Kherson Oblast.

== Geography ==
=== Climate ===
Climate data for Velyka Oleksandrivka (1981–2010)
Month	Jan	Feb	Mar	Apr	May	Jun	Jul	Aug	Sep	Oct	Nov	Dec	Year
Mean daily maximum °C (°F)	0.6 (33.1)	1.6 (34.9)	7.4 (45.3)	16.0 (60.8)	22.7 (72.9)	26.6 (79.9)	29.2 (84.6)	28.8 (83.8)	22.5 (72.5)	15.3 (59.5)	6.9 (44.4)	1.9 (35.4)	15.0 (59.0)
Daily mean °C (°F)	−2.3 (27.9)	−1.9 (28.6)	2.9 (37.2)	10.1 (50.2)	16.2 (61.2)	20.3 (68.5)	22.7 (72.9)	22.0 (71.6)	16.3 (61.3)	9.9 (49.8)	3.4 (38.1)	−0.9 (30.4)	9.9 (49.8)
Mean daily minimum °C (°F)	−5.0 (23.0)	−5.0 (23.0)	−0.7 (30.7)	5.0 (41.0)	10.0 (50.0)	14.6 (58.3)	16.7 (62.1)	15.6 (60.1)	10.8 (51.4)	5.6 (42.1)	0.5 (32.9)	−3.5 (25.7)	5.4 (41.7)
Average precipitation mm (inches)	32.5 (1.28)	34.5 (1.36)	30.7 (1.21)	34.1 (1.34)	49.2 (1.94)	60.9 (2.40)	58.4 (2.30)	45.2 (1.78)	43.2 (1.70)	32.8 (1.29)	40.0 (1.57)	36.5 (1.44)	498.0 (19.61)
Average precipitation days (≥ 1.0 mm)	6.9	6.5	6.2	6.2	6.4	7.6	5.6	4.8	5.2	5.2	5.8	6.4	72.8
Average relative humidity (%)	86.7	83.1	78.0	68.2	64.7	67.0	64.1	62.3	69.2	77.3	86.3	88.0	74.6
Source: World Meteorological Organization

== Demographics ==
As of the 2001 Ukrainian census, the settlement had a population of 7,540. The linguistic composition was:

Native languages in Velyka Oleksandrivka
Languages	percent
Ukrainian	94.7%
Russian	4.5%
Moldovan	0.2%
Armenian	0.2%
Romani	0.2%
Belarusian	0.1%
others	0.1%

== Economy ==
=== Transportation ===
Velyka Oleksandrivka is on a paved road which connects Novovorontsovka and Beryslav, where it has access to Kherson.

The closest railway station is in Bila Krynytsia, about 10 kilometres (6.2 mi) northwest, on the railway connecting Apostolove and Snihurivka (with a further connection to Kherson and Mykolaiv).

== See also ==
- Russian occupation of Kherson Oblast
