= Apostolove urban hromada =

Aposotolove urban hromada Апостолівська міська громада
- Hromada
- Interactive map of Aposotolove urban hromada
- Country: Ukraine
- Oblast: Dnipropetrovsk Oblast
- Raion: Kryvyi Rih Raion
- Admin. center: Apostolove

Area
  - Total: 679.5 km^{2} (262.4 sq mi)

Population (2018)
  - Total: 23,331
  - Density: 34.34/km^{2} (88.93/sq mi)
- CATOTTG code: UA12060010000090992
- Settlements: 20
- Cities: 1
- Rural settlements: 2
- Villages: 17
- Website: https://apost.otg.dp.gov.ua/ua

Apostolove urban territorial hromada (Ukrainian: Апостолівська міська територіальна громада, romanized: Apostolivska miska terytorialna hromada) is one of the hromadas of Ukraine, located in Kryvyi Rih Raion within Dnipropetrovsk Oblast. The administrative center is the city of Apostolove.

The hromada has an area of 679.5 km^{2} (262.4 mi^{2}), as well as a population of 23,331 (2018).

It was formed on August 5, 2015, by merging the Apostolove City Council and the Volodymyrivka, Kamianka, Mykhailivka, and Pershe Travnia village councils of the Apostolove Raion.

== Composition ==
In addition to one city (Apostolove), the hromada contains 2 rural settlements (Ukrainka, Zhovte) and 17 villages:

- Chervona Kolona
- Kamianka
- Katerynivka
- Kozatskyi Kut
- Mykhailivka
- Mykhailo-Zavodske
- Nova Sich
- Novoivanivka
- Novomarianivka
- Novosemenivka
- Serhiivka
- Shevchenko
- Shyrochany
- Slovianka
- Taraso-Hryhorivka
- Volodymyrivka
- Zaporizke
