= Babyne, Kakhovka Raion =

Babyne Бабине
- Location of Babyne Babyne (Ukraine)
- Coordinates: 47°24′23″N 34°3′2″E
- Country: Ukraine
- Oblast: Kherson Oblast
- Raion: Kakhovka Raion
- Hromada: Verkhniy Rohachyk settlement hromada

Area
  - Total: 1,787 km^{2} (690 sq mi)
- Elevation: 66 m (217 ft)

Population (2001)
  - Total: 240
  - Density: 134.3/km^{2} (348/sq mi)
- Postal code: 74411
- Area code: +380 5545

Babyne (Ukrainian: Ба́бине) is a village in Kakhovka Raion, Kherson Oblast, Ukraine.

== History ==
The Bronze Age settlement of Babyne III was discovered near the village of Babyne in 1956 by Soviet Ukrainian archaeologist Arkady Dobrovolskyi. During the excavations, two dwellings were discovered along with animal and fish bones and flint and bone tools. Dishes with glued rollers were also discovered. Babyne III is one of the most studied settlements for the multi-rolled ceramics.

In 1886, 869 people lived in Nizhnyi Rohachyk volost, which was composed of the villages of Nizhnyi Rohachyk, Karaidubina (now Berezhanka), and Ushkalka. Babyne has been occupied by Russian troops since February 24, 2022 in the Russian invasion of Ukraine.

== Demographics ==
The 1989 census of Ukraine reported that 320 people lived in Babyne; 128 men and 192 women. This declined to 240 people by 2001. In the 2001 census, 98.33% of Babyne spoke Ukrainian, and 1.67% spoke Russian.

== Notable people ==
- Konstantyn Sushko - Ukrainian writer and journalist
