= Novovoznesenske =

Village in Kherson Oblast, Ukraine

Novovoznesenske Нововознесенське
- Village
- Interactive map of Novovoznesenske
- Location of Novovoznesenske within Ukraine Novovoznesenske (Ukraine)
- Coordinates: 47.428333°N 33.601389°E
- Country: Ukraine
- Oblast: Kherson Oblast
- Raion: Beryslav Raion
- Founded: 1885

Area
  - Total: 13.21 km^{2} (5.10 sq mi)
- Elevation: 82 m (269 ft)

Population (2001 census)
  - Total: 662
  - Density: 50.1/km^{2} (130/sq mi)
- Time zone: UTC+2 (EET)
  - Summer (DST): UTC+3 (EEST)
- Postal code: 74042
- Area code: +380 5535

Novovoznesenske (Ukrainian: Нововознесенське; Russian: Нововознесенское) is a village in Beryslav Raion, Kherson Oblast, southern Ukraine, about 120.5 kilometres (74.9 mi) northeast from the centre of Kherson city.

== History ==
The village was founded in 1886 by the first settlers, Feofan, Demian and Taras Makalov, and Ilya Semko. They came from Odesa, Mykolaiv, and Kherson. The village name comes from some of the immigrants who came from the village of Voznesensk in Odesa Oblast. In 1897, a zemstvo school was built in the village.

In early 1918, the village was occupied by German troops after the Treaty of Brest-Litovsk. The following year, in 1919, it was occupied by troops of the White movement military leader, Anton Denikin. Bolshevik troops took the village for the Soviet Union from Denikin in 1920 under the command of Semyon Budyonny. In 1926, a joint land cultivation society was formed in the village, and in 1929, a collective farm was started. In 1930, the artel "Proletari" was formed. During the Great Patriotic War, the village was occupied by German troops from 18 August 1941 to 27 February 1944. After the war, the village and its surrounding villages were united into one collective farm called "Bolshevik", which specialized in grain production and dairy.

During the Russo-Ukrainian War, the Ukrainian military recaptured the village from Russian forces on 6 April 2022.

== Demographics ==
The settlement had 662 inhabitants in 2001. The native language distribution as of the Ukrainian Census of 2001 was:

- Ukrainian: 96.14%
- Russian: 2.73%
- Armenian: 0.64%
- Belarusian: 0.32%

== Monuments ==
There is a monument to fallen soldiers located in the village and a memorial sign to a Hero of Socialist Labour, Pyotr Kuzmich Bondarenko (a painter prominent in Ukrainian Socialist realism). In addition, there is a monument to the fallen soldiers who liberated the village of Kostyrka from the Nazis.
