= Zelenyi Hai, Beryslav Raion, Kherson Oblast =

Rural locality in Kherson Oblast, Ukraine

Zelenyi Hai Зелений Гай
- Village
- Interactive map of Zelenyi Hai
- Location of Zelenyi Hai within Ukraine Zelenyi Hai (Ukraine)
- Coordinates: 47°09′56″N 32°58′43″E
- Country: Ukraine
- Oblast: Kherson Oblast
- Raion: Beryslav Raion

Area
  - Total: 0.651 km^{2} (0.251 sq mi)
- Elevation: 91 m (299 ft)

Population (2001 census)
  - Total: 118
  - Density: 181/km^{2} (469/sq mi)
- Time zone: UTC+2 (EET)
  - Summer (DST): UTC+3 (EEST)
- Postal code: 74132
- Area code: +380 5532

Zelenyi Hai (Ukrainian: Зелений Гай) is a village in Beryslav Raion, Kherson Oblast, southern Ukraine. It belongs to the Kalynivske settlement hromada, one of the hromadas of Ukraine. The village has an area of 0.651 km2.

== History ==
The village was founded in 1921. From 26 August 1941 to 13 March 1944 the village was occupied by German forces during the Great Patriotic War, before being liberated by Soviet troops.

On 27 May 2022, Ukrainian forces shot and crashed a Russian Air Force Sukhoi Su-25SM near Zelenyi Hai. It was piloted by a member of the 37 Mixed Aviation Regiment, a starshiy leytenant (Senior Lieutenant) named Nikita Malkovsky. A company located in Warwickshire, United Kingdom, later fashioned the jet into keyrings, where the money would be donated back to Ukraine.

== Administrative status ==
Until 18 July 2020, Zelenyi Hai belonged to Velyka Oleksandrivka Raion. The raion was abolished in July 2020 as part of the administrative reform of Ukraine, which reduced the number of raions of Kherson Oblast to five. The area of Velyka Oleksandrivka Raion was merged into Beryslav Raion.

The village has an area of 0.651 km2.

== Demographics ==
According to the 2001 Ukrainian Census, the only official census taken in post-independence Ukraine, the population of the village was 118 people. Of the people residing in the village, their mother tongue is as follows:

Language	Percentage of Population
Ukrainian	90.68%
Russian	9.32%
