= Arkadiy Dobrovolskyi =

Ukrainian archaeologist (1887–1956)

Arkadiy Viktorovich Dobrovolskyi
- Аркадій Вікторович Добровольський
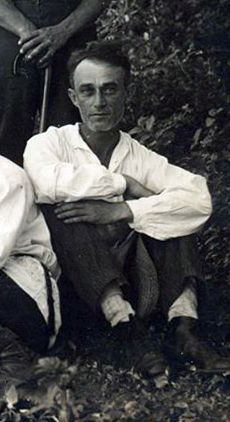
- Arkadiy Dobrovolskyi
- Born: February 18, 1887; Poltavka, Shirokov Volost, Kherson Oblast, Russian Empire
- Died: June 27, 1956 (aged 69); Kyiv, Ukrainian SSR
- Education: Imperial Novorossiya University
- Occupations: Archaeologist, professor
- Years active: 1905-1956
- Known for: Head of the primitive archaeology department at the NASU Institute of Archaeology

Arkadiy Viktorovich Dobrovolskyi (Ukrainian: Аркадій Вікторович Добровольський; February 18, 1887 – June 27, 1956) was a Ukrainian archaeologist and researcher who led the NASU Institute of Archaeology for several years and excavated various sites in southern Ukraine.

== Biography ==
Dobrovolskyi was born on February 18, 1887 in the village of Poltavtsi, Shirokov Volost, Kherson Oblast to the family of local wealthy nobleman Viktor Vasylyovich Dobrovolskyi and his wife Hanna Platonivna. Dobrovolskyi spent his childhood in Odesa where he received his secondary education at the Richelieu Gymnasium. In 1906, he attended the physics and mathematics department of the Imperial Novorossiysk University, now Odesa University, later transferring to the law department, where he graduated in 1912. Before attending the university, Dobrovolskyi worked at the Odesa Society of History and Antiquities (OTIS), studying the artifacts under Ernst Stern. In 1910, Dobrovolskyi went to Kherson to acquaint himself with the local history museum. In Kherson, he met Viktor Hoshkevich, a famous local archaeologist. Dobrovolskyi's meeting and eventual friendship with Hoshkevich directed him into the field of archaeology.

After graduating from university in 1912 and the simultaneous election as a corresponding member of the OTIS, Dobrovolskyi began his own archaeological practice. His first excavation was of a burial mound in Slobodka-Romanovka, a suburb of Odesa. The Slobodka-Romanovka excavations were carried out between 1912 and 1913, and were also Dobrovolskyi's first scientific publication.

Between 1914 and 1932, Doborovolskyi worked at the Kherson Local History Museum and at the Kherson Institute of National Education. During that time, he also excavated several barrows, excavated the Inhulets from the delta at the Dnipro to the village of Mala Seidemynukha. Dobrovolskyi also excavated Bronze Age settlements near Beryslav and the village of Novooleksandrivka. Some of these studies were published in the "Bulletin of the Odesa Regional History Commission at the Ukrainian Academy of Sciences", of whom Dobrovolskyi was a member.

In 1928, Dobrovolskyi was involved in excavating the Dniprohes reservoir, which was to be flooded by the Dnieper Hydroelectric Station. Many of his excavations were significant to the region of Nadporizhia near Dnipro. Between 1932 and 1938, Dobrovolskyi worked often in the Dmytro Yavornytsky National Historical Museum of Dnipro, returning to Odesa in 1939. In 1940, Dobrovolskyi was hired as a senior researcher for the NASU Institute of Archaeology, lecturing about archaeology at Taras Shevchenko National University of Kyiv. After World War II, Dobrovolskyi continued his archaeological work in the Nadporizhia region and in southern Ukraine.

In 1951, Dobrovolskyi conducted archaeological excavations in the area where the Kakhovka Dam was to be built. His research near the Kahkovskaya Dam led him to be promoted to head of the NASU Institute of Archaeology's department of primitive archaeology. Dobrovolskyi effectively headed all archaeological excavations on early human history across the entire Ukrainian SSR.

Dobrovolskyi's most important sites excavated and surveyed were the late Paleolithic site of Kaistrova Balka IV between 1932 and 1933 and the Neolithic settlements and burial grounds of Serednyi Stoh, Sobachki-Vovchok, Vynohradnyi Ostrov, Ihren, Chapli, and Nezvyska in Ivano-Frankivsk Oblast. Of the Bronze Age sites, Dobrovolskyi excavated and studied Durna Skelya, Strilcha Skelya, Sabatynivka, Babyne III, a Trypillian settlement near Sabatynivka, and the Zolota Balka archaeological site in Zolota Balka.
