= Novovorontsovka Raion =

Former subdivision of Kherson Oblast, Ukraine

Novovorontsovskyi Raion Нововоронцовський район
- Raion
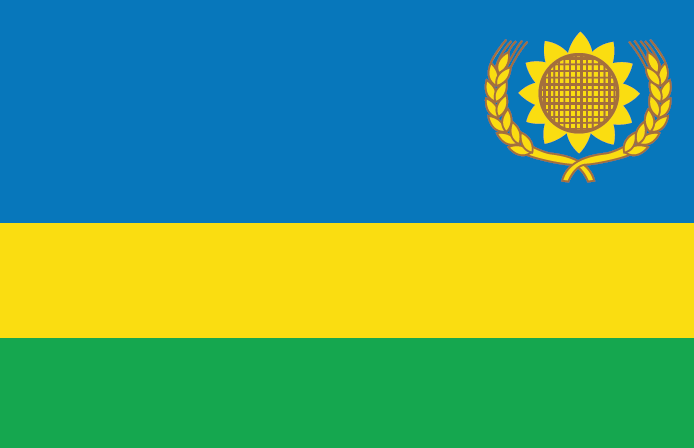
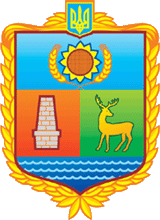
- Flag Coat of arms

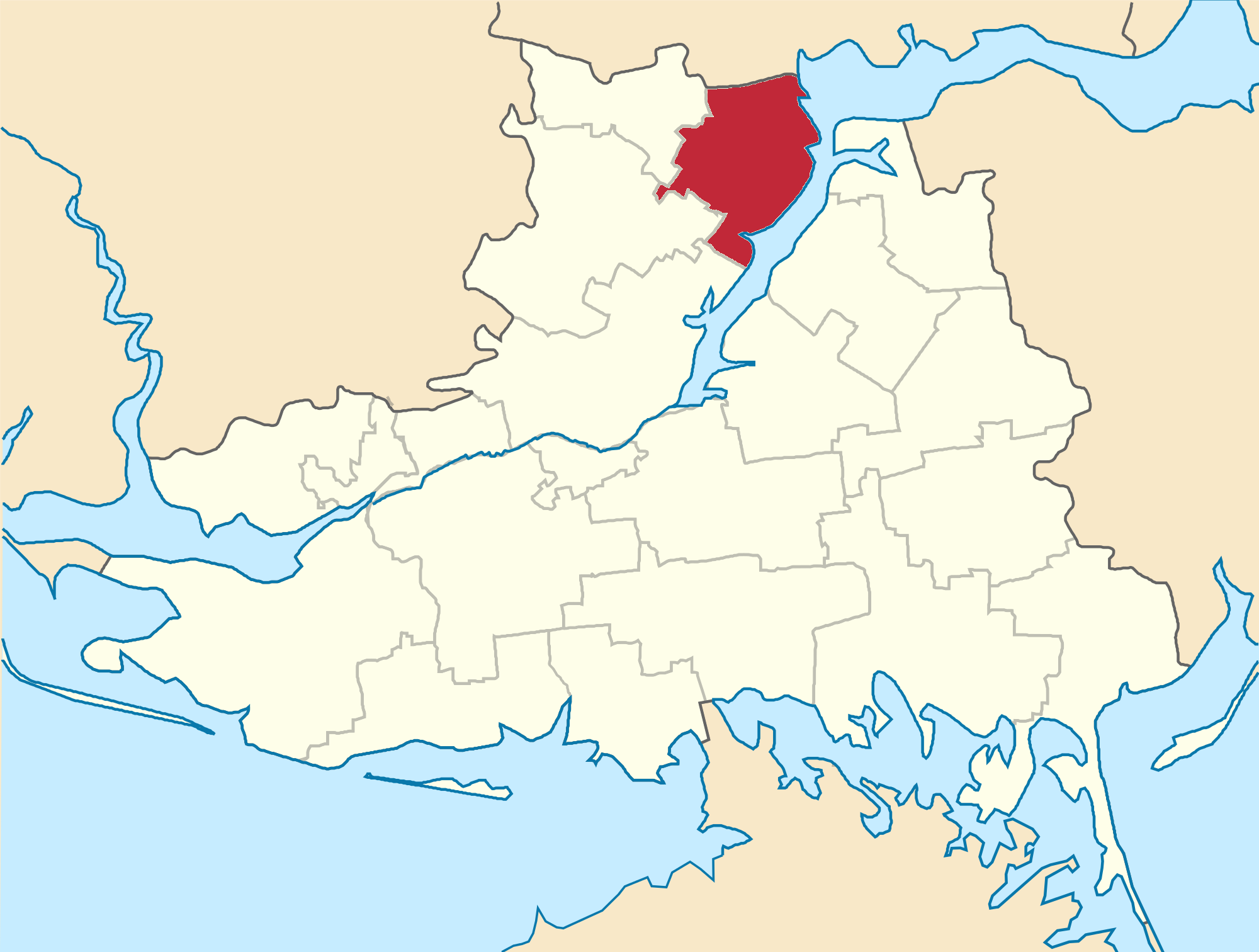
- Coordinates: 47°20′14.3052″N 33°47′26.6316″E
- Country: Ukraine
- Region: Kherson Oblast
- Established: 1935
- Disestablished: 18 July 2020
- Admin. center: Novovorontsovka
- Subdivisions: List: 0 — city councils; 1 — settlement councils; 12 — rural councils; Number of localities: 0 — cities; 1 — urban-type settlements; 18 — villages; 1 — rural settlements

Area
  - Total: 1,000 km^{2} (390 sq mi)

Population (2020)
  - Total: 20,251 ▼
  - Density: 20/km^{2} (52/sq mi)
- Time zone: UTC+02:00 (EET)
  - Summer (DST): UTC+03:00 (EEST)
- Postal index: 74200—74233
- Area code: +380 5533

Novovorontsovka Raion (Ukrainian: Нововоронцовський район) was one of the 18 administrative raions (a district) of Kherson Oblast in southern Ukraine. Its administrative center was located in the urban-type settlement of Novovorontsovka. The raion was abolished on 18 July 2020 as part of the administrative reform of Ukraine, which reduced the number of raions of Kherson Oblast to five. The area of Novovorontsovka Raion was merged into Beryslav Raion. The last estimate of the raion population was 20,251 (2020 est.)

At the time of disestablishment, the raion consisted of two hromadas:

- Novooleksandrivka rural hromada with the administration in the selo of Novooleksandrivka;
- Novovorontsovka settlement hromada with the administration in Novovorontsovka.
