= Burhunka =

Rural locality in Kherson Oblast, Ukraine

Burhunka Бургунка
- Village
- Interactive map of Burhunka
- Location within Kherson Oblast Location within Ukraine
- Coordinates: 46.8119°N 33.2267°E
- Country: Ukraine
- Oblast: Kherson
- Raion: Beryslav
- Population: 1,159

Burhunka (Ukrainian and Russian: Бургунка) is a village in Beryslav Raion, within Kherson Oblast, Ukraine. It belongs to Tiahynka rural hromada, one of the hromadas of Ukraine.

== History ==
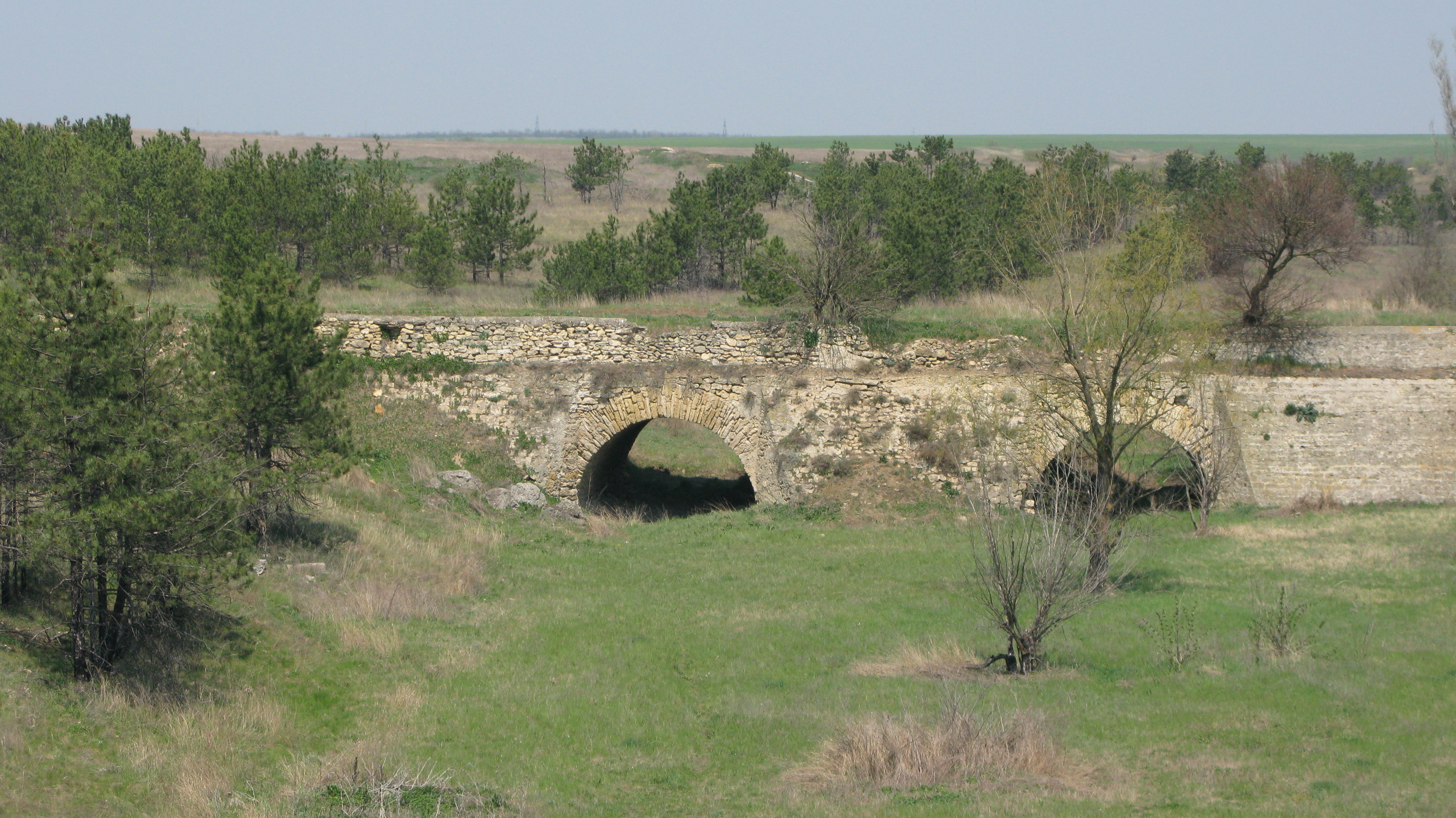
A bridge associated with the Ekaterininsky Tract during the 18th century during Russian imperial expansion, which is a national heritage monument.

The village was founded on 16 August 1779. Its name either comes from the village of Burgundy in modern France, which was formed by the Burgundians, who, it has been speculated, went so far as to the territory of Burhunka. It has also been speculated that the German word "burg", or a city/fortification. On the lands where the village was formed, in 1550, the village was a crossing and fortification of Vytautas the Great. During the second half of the XVII century, it is also mentioned in military drawings as a fortress of the Turks, and later, after the Chyhyryn campaign (1678), a new fortress is mentioned called Hon-Burhunka.

When the village was formally established in the 1770s, it was privately owned by the Trubetskoy family. The central economy, however, was located in the nearby village of Kozatske. Soviet control of the village was established in January 1918, temporarily, but it became permanent in the summer of 1920. During the Great Patriotic War, the village was occupied by German troops from 21 August 1941 to 11 March 1944. During the 1960s, the village had a branch of the state farm-plant called "Kamyansky", which was reorganized into a separate farm in 1975 called "Бургунський". This was reversed in the mid-1990s.

== Demographics ==
According to the 2001 Ukrainian Census, the only official census taken in post-independence Ukraine, the population of the village was 1,159 people.

== Monuments ==
There is an obelisk located in the village to honor the villagers who died during World War II. Religiously, there is also a Church of the Nativity of the Virgin Mary of the Ukrainian Orthodox Church.
