= Vysokopillia Raion =

Former subdivision of Kherson Oblast, Ukraine

Vysokopillia Raion Високопільський район
- Raion
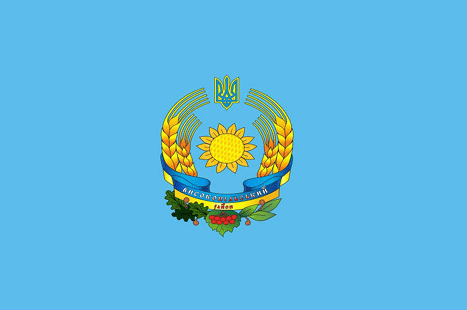
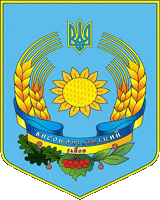
- Flag Coat of arms

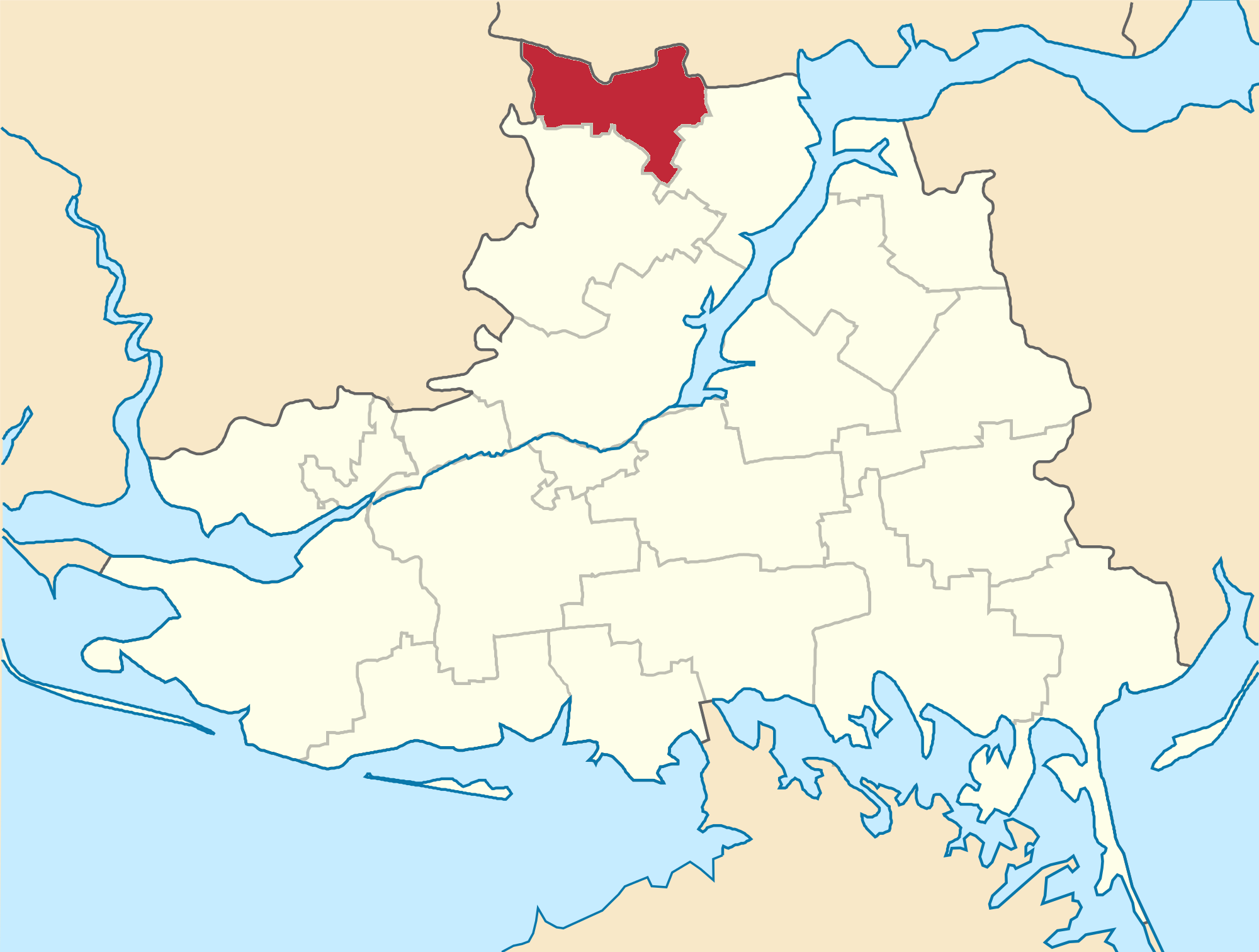
- Coordinates: 47°28′7.8312″N 33°24′11.6748″E
- Country: Ukraine
- Region: Kherson Oblast
- Established: 1928
- Disestablished: 18 July 2020
- Admin. center: Vysokopillia
- Subdivisions: List: 0 — city councils; 2 — settlement councils; 10 — rural councils; Number of localities: 0 — cities; 2 — urban-type settlements; 34 — villages; — rural settlements

Government
  - Governor: Viktor Romanov

Area
  - Total: 701 km^{2} (271 sq mi)

Population (2020)
  - Total: 14,119 ▼
  - Density: 20.1/km^{2} (52.2/sq mi)
- Time zone: UTC+02:00 (EET)
  - Summer (DST): UTC+03:00 (EEST)
- Postal index: 74000—74043
- Area code: +380 5535

Vysokopillia Raion (Ukrainian: Високопільський район) was one of the 18 administrative raions (a district) of Kherson Oblast in southern Ukraine. Its administrative center was located in the urban-type settlement of Vysokopillia. The raion was abolished on 18 July 2020 as part of the administrative reform of Ukraine, which reduced the number of raions of Kherson Oblast to five. The area of Vysokopillia Raion was merged into Beryslav Raion. The last estimate of the raion population was 14,119 (2020 est.)

At the time of disestablishment, the raion consisted of two hromadas:

- Kochubeivka rural hromada with the administration in the selo of Kochubeivka;
- Vysokopillia settlement hromada with the administration in Vysokopillia.
