= Novoraisk =

Novoraisk Новорайськ
- Rural settlement
- Interactive map of Novoraisk
- Location of Novoraisk in Kherson Oblast Novoraisk (Ukraine)
- Coordinates: 47.008611°N 33.485556°E
- Country: Ukraine
- Oblast: Kherson Oblast
- Raion: Beryslav Raion
- Hromada: Novoraisk rural hromada
- Status: 1921

Area
  - Total: 147.921 km^{2} (57.113 sq mi)
- Elevation: 69 m (226 ft)

Population (2001 census)
  - Total: 2,376
  - Density: 16.06/km^{2} (41.60/sq mi)
- Time zone: UTC+2 (EET)
  - Summer (DST): UTC+3 (EEST)
- Postal code: 74360
- Area code: +380 5546

Novoraisk (Ukrainian: Новорайськ; Russian: Новорайск) is a rural settlement (selyshche) in Ukraine, and the center of the Novoraisk rural hromada, in Beryslav Raion, Kherson Oblast.

The settlement came under attack by Russian forces during the Russian invasion of Ukraine in 2022.

== Notable people ==
- Oleksiy Kucher – Ukrainian lawyer and politician.
- Inna Osypenko-Radomska – Ukrainian kayaker, Olympic medalist in Beijing 2008.

== Demographics ==
According to the 2001 Ukrainian census, the settlement had 2376 inhabitants. The linguistic composition of the settlement was as follows:

Native languages in Novoraisk
	percent
Ukrainian	93.2%
Russian	6.5%
Romanian	0.1%
Belarusian	0.1%
others	0.1%
