= Borozenske =

Village in Kherson Oblast, Ukraine

Borozenske Борозенське
- Village
- Interactive map of Borozenske
- Location of Borozenske in Kherson Oblast Borozenske (Ukraine)
- Coordinates: 47.178611°N 33.419722°E
- Country: Ukraine
- Oblast: Kherson Oblast
- Raion: Beryslav Raion
- Founded: 1909

Area
  - Total: 2.067 km^{2} (0.798 sq mi)
- Elevation: 139 m (456 ft)

Population (2001 census)
  - Total: 2,021
  - Density: 977.7/km^{2} (2,532/sq mi)
- Time zone: UTC+2 (EET)
  - Summer (DST): UTC+3 (EEST)
- Postal code: 75014
- Area code: +380 5547

Borozenske (Ukrainian: Борозенське; Russian: Борозенское) is a village in Beryslav Raion (district) in Kherson Oblast of southern eastern Ukraine, at about 54.4 kilometres (33.8 mi) northeast of Kherson. It hosts the administration of the Borozenske rural hromada, one of the hromadas of Ukraine.

== History ==
The village was first founded as a monastic hamlet during the year 1862, and continued to have an influx of settlers until 1885. It got its name from the village of Borozne in the Vysokopillia settlement hromada (which is now known as Arkhanhelske). During the Great Patriotic War, the village was occupied by German troops from 22 August 1941 to 11 March 1944, and 57 of the residents of the village fought in the war. During late Soviet times it was the home of the central estate of the Lenin Order collective farm "Bilshevyk Offensive", which managed 16,800 hectares of farmland, and mainly produced grain and meat-dairy products. The farm was later awarded the Red Banner of the USSR Ministry of Agriculture.

The settlement came under attack by Russian forces during the Russian invasion of Ukraine in 2022 and was regained by Ukrainian forces in the beginning of October the same year.

== Demographics ==
The settlement had 2,021 inhabitants in 2001, native language distribution as of the Ukrainian Census of the same year:

- Ukrainian: 93.87%
- Russian: 5.34%
- Belarusian: 0.30%
- Moldovan (Romanian): 0.25%
- Bulgarian: 0.10%
- German: 0.10%

== Monuments ==
Multiple monuments stand in the city. There is a monument to the soldiers who died during World War II and a memorial plaque to the former president of the public organization "Community of Kherson Oblast", A.P. Snegach, at the House of Culture. There is also a church dedicated to Saint Elijah of the eparchy of Kakhovka-Beryslav of the Ukrainian Orthodox Church (Moscow Patriarchate).

There was also a statue dedicated to Vladimir Lenin, but it was taken down due to decommunization.
