= Vysoke, Kherson Oblast =

Rural locality in Kherson Oblast, Ukraine

Vysoke високe
- Village
- Interactive map of Vysoke
- Location within Kherson Oblast Location within Ukraine
- Coordinates: 46.9214°N 33.0992°E
- Country: Ukraine
- Oblast: Kherson
- Raion: Beryslav
- Elevation: 53 m (174 ft)
- Population: 1,030

Vysoke (Ukrainian: Високе; Russian: Высокое) is a village in Beryslav Raion, Kherson Oblast, Ukraine. It was founded in 1928 as Neufeld and renamed Vysoke in 1946. Vysoke is part of Tiahynka rural hromada, one of the hromadas of Ukraine. Its population was 690.

== History ==
The village was founded in 1926 by German colonists, who called the village Neufeld. During the Great Patriotic War, the village was occupied by German troops from 19 August 1941 to 12 March 1944. 38 villagers fought against the German army, of which 12 of them died. After the end of the German occupation, the village was renamed to its current name, Vysoke, due to anti-German sentiment. During Soviet times, the village was the location of the central estate of the state farm "Ukraina", which owned 9.9 thousand hectares of agricultural land and had 4 departments, but most prominent were grain and meat and dairy.

On 5 January 2024, Russian forces hit an administrative building and modular town within the village utilizing Shahed-type drones, resulting in multiple casualties.

== Demographics ==
According to the 2001 Ukrainian Census, the only official census taken in post-independence Ukraine, the population of the village was 1,030 people. Of the people residing in the village, their mother tongue is as follows:

Language	Percentage of Population
Ukrainian	95.83%
Russian	3.88%
Other	0.29%
