= Novovorontsovka =

Rural locality in Kherson Oblast, Ukraine

Novovorontsovka Нововоронцовка
- Rural settlement
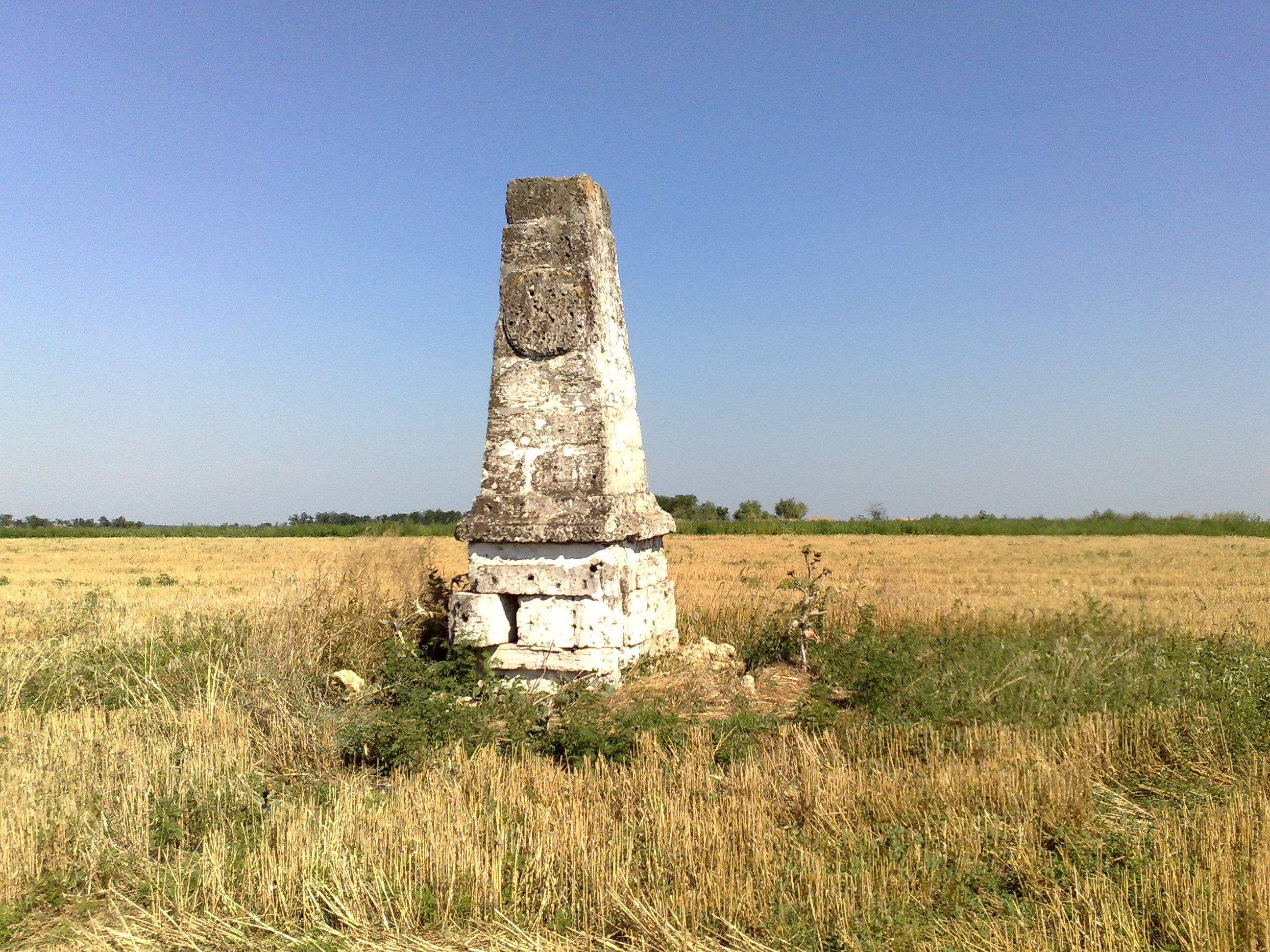
- A milestone in Novovorontsovka
- Interactive map of Novovorontsovka
- Location within Kherson Oblast Location within Ukraine
- Coordinates: 47°30′N 33°55′E
- Country: Ukraine
- Oblast: Kherson Oblast
- Raion: Beryslav Raion
- Hromada: Novovorontsovka settlement hromada

Population (2022)
  - Total: ▼5,951
- Time zone: UTC+2 (EET)
  - Summer (DST): UTC+3 (EEST)
- KATOTTH: UA65020150010061497

Novovorontsovka (Ukrainian: Нововоронцовка; Russian: Нововоронцовка) is a rural settlement in Beryslav Raion, Kherson Oblast, southern Ukraine. It hosts the administration of Novovorontsovka settlement hromada, one of the hromadas of Ukraine. Novovorontsovka is located on the right bank of the former Kakhovka Reservoir, an artificial reservoir on the Dnieper. It has a population of 5,951 (2022 estimate).

== History ==
The settlement is first mentioned in written sources in 1795 as Mykolaivka (Ukrainian: Миколаївка). At the time, it was part of Kherson uyezd of the Russian Empire. As of 1799, it had a population of 524 people. The land belonged to a major general Von Stahl. In 1821, the settlement was bought by Russian nobleman and field marshal Mikhail Vorontsov, who renamed the settlement Novovorontsovka after his own surname. In 1835, it had a population of 1,437 people. The settlement's Jewish population first settled in Novovorontsovka in the early 19th century. There were 1,685 Jews in the town in 1897, which was 32.5% of its total population. Most of the Jews in the area worked as artisans or retailers.

During World War I, Novovorontsovka was occupied by the Central Powers during Operation Faustschlag. During the Russian Civil War, Novovorontsovka changed hands multiple times between the warring factions, before eventually falling into the hands of the Bolsheviks, who established the communist Soviet Union on much of the former territory of the Russian Empire. The violence of the civil war and the tragedies of the revolution caused immense suffering for the Jews of Novovorontsovka. The bulk of Jews migrated from Novovorontsovka to larger cities during the 1920s and 1930s in pursuit of employment and educational possibilities. Only 42 Jews were still present in the community by 1939, making about 1.1% of the total population.

In 1935, Novovorontsovka became the center of Novovorontsovka Raion.

On August 18, 1941, during World War II, German forces seized control of Novovorontsovka. Only twenty Jews were able to flee before German forces arrived. The Germans operated a Nazi prison in the settlement. On September 24, 1941, the last Jews were massacred close to the village. The Red Army liberated Novovorontsovka on February 27, 1944. The economy of the town was heavily destroyed by the end of the Nazi occupation, but it was slowly rebuilt.

In 1956, Novovorontsovka received urban-type settlement status. In 1963, Novovorontsovka Raion was briefly abolished, only to be re-established in 1965.

On 18 July 2020 Novovorontsovka Raion was abolished as part of the administrative reform of Ukraine, which reduced the number of raions of Kherson Oblast to five. The area of Novovorontsovka Raion, including Novovorontsovka itself, was merged into Beryslav Raion.

During the Russian invasion of Ukraine, Novovorontsovka did not come under Russian occupation, but was located in a "gray zone", according to locals. By 31 March 2022, units of Ukraine's 60th Infantry Brigade and the 4th Battalion of the 17th Tank Brigade had established control over Novovorontsovka.

Novovorontsovka was constantly shelled by Russian forces as it sat near the frontline for some time before the 2022 Kherson counteroffensive. The local leadership fled the town, and much of the residents lost electricity and running water due to destruction of infrastructure.

Until 26 January 2024, Novovorontsovka was designated urban-type settlement. On this day, a new law entered into force which abolished this status, and Novovorontsovka became a rural settlement.

== Economy ==
=== Transportation ===
Novovorontsovka has access to the Highway H23 which connects Kryvyi Rih and Nikopol. Another road follows the right bank of the Dnieper and connects the settlement with Beryslav with access to Kherson.

The closest railway station is about 10 kilometres (6.2 mi) north in Tik on the railway connecting Apostolove and Zaporizhzhia.

== Demographics ==
Population history

Year	Pop.	±% p.a.
1799	524	—
1835	1,437	+2.84%
1859	1,849	+1.06%
1886	1,494	−0.79%

Year	Pop.	±% p.a.
1923	4,200	+2.83%
2001	7,111	+0.68%
2020	6,162	−0.75%
2022	5,951	−1.73%

As of January 1, 2020, Novovorontsovka had a population of 6,162 people. Ethnically, the town is mostly Ukrainians (93%), with small minorities of Russians (4%), Belarusians (1.6%), Moldovans, Armenians, and Jews.
