= Darivka, Kherson Raion =

Darivka Дарївка
- Village
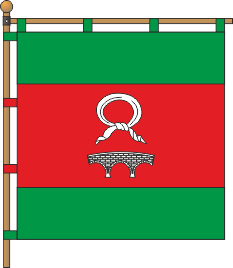
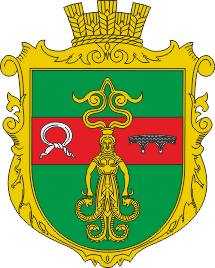
- Flag Coat of arms

- Location within Kherson Oblast Location within Ukraine
- Coordinates: 46°44′54.0″N 32°47′44.9″E
- Country: Ukraine
- Oblast: Kherson Oblast
- Raion: Kherson Raion
- Hromada: Darivka rural hromada

Area
  - Total: 3.85 km^{2} (1.49 sq mi)
- Elevation: 18 m (59 ft)

Population (2001)
  - Total: 2,855
  - Density: 742/km^{2} (1,920/sq mi)
- Time zone: UTC+2 (Eastern European Time)
  - Summer (DST): UTC+3 (Eastern European Summer Time)
- Postal code: 75032

Darivka (Ukrainian: Дар'ївка), is a village located on the Inhulets River in Kherson Raion, Kherson Oblast, southern Ukraine. It has a population of approximately 2,855 people.

== Administrative status ==
Until July 2020, Darivka was in the Bilozerka Raion of Kherson Oblast. The raion was abolished in July 2020 as a result of the administrative reform of Ukraine's districts, which reduced the number of raions in Kherson Oblast to five, merging Bilozerka Raion into Kherson Raion.

== Russian invasion of Ukraine ==
During the Russian invasion of Ukraine, units of the Kherson territorial defense were deployed to Darivka in the early morning hours of 25 February to defend its bridge over the Inhulets from Russian paratroopers. They withdrew shortly after being deployed due to the risk of being outflanked, as Russian forces had retaken control of the Antonivka Road Bridge.

On 23 July, the Ukrainian military bombarded Darivka's bridge over the Inhulets River, causing significant damage and disrupting the Russian military's supply lines.

The Russian military detonated the bridge in Darivka on 9 November 2022 amid its withdrawal from the right bank of the Dnieper. Along with the city of Kherson, Darivka was liberated from the occupying troops on 11 November 2022 during Ukraine's Kherson counteroffensive.
