= Novooleksandrivka, Beryslav Raion, Kherson Oblast =

Village in Kherson Oblast, Ukraine

Novooleksandrivka Новоолександрівка
- Village
- Interactive map of Novooleksandrivka
- Location of Novooleksandrivka in Kherson Oblast Novooleksandrivka (Ukraine)
- Coordinates: 47.266389°N 33.873611°E
- Country: Ukraine
- Oblast: Kherson Oblast
- Raion: Beryslav Raion
- Founded Status: 1925

Area
  - Total: 165.1 km^{2} (63.7 sq mi)
- Elevation: 139 m (456 ft)

Population (2001 census)
  - Total: 1,335
  - Density: 8.086/km^{2} (20.94/sq mi)
- Time zone: UTC+2 (EET)
  - Summer (DST): UTC+3 (EEST)
- Postal code: 75014
- Area code: +380 5547

Novooleksandrivka (Ukrainian: Новоолександрівка) is a village in Beryslav Raion (district) in Kherson Oblast of southern Ukraine, at about 119.8 kilometres (74.4 mi) northeast by east (NEbE) of Kherson. It hosts the administration of the Novooleksandrivka rural hromada, one of the hromadas of Ukraine.

== History ==
The village was founded in 1922 on the territory of the noble Falz-Fein estate during the Russian Empire. It was originally entitled Kuzmopavlivka by the first inhabitant, Kuzma Pavlovych Babenko. In 1924 it formally became part of the Havrylivka village council and in January was renamed to its current name, Novooleksandrivka, after the original founder's wife, Alexandra.

In 1929, two societies were formed for joint cultivation of land, which in 1931 were united to make the collective farm "The Way to the Commune". This was later the basis for a state farm named after Panas Liubchenko. However, that state farm was later renamed to Prydniprovsky in 1936 due to Liubchenko falling out of favor with Joseph Stalin and him being accused of bourgeois nationalism. During the Great Patriotic War, the village was occupied by German troops from 23 August 1941 to 29 February 1944. After the fall of the Soviet Union, the former state farm was reorganized into OJSC "Prydniprovske".

The settlement came under attack by Russian forces during the Russian invasion of Ukraine in 2022 and was regained by Ukrainian forces by the beginning of October the same year.

== Demographics ==
The settlement had 1,335 inhabitants in 2001, native language distribution as of the Ukrainian Census of the same year:

- Ukrainian: 94.84%
- Russian: 4.32%
- Moldovan (Romanian): 0.15%
- Belarusian: 0.08%
- Armenian: 0.08%

== Monuments ==
There is a Memorial of Glory and a Church of the Assumption of the Virgin located in the village.
