= Velyka Oleksandrivka Raion =

Former subdivision of Kherson Oblast, Ukraine

Velyka Oleksandrivka Raion Великоолександрівський район
- Raion
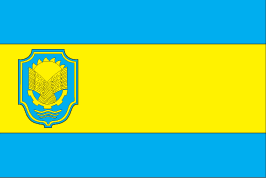
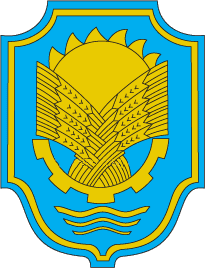
- Flag Coat of arms

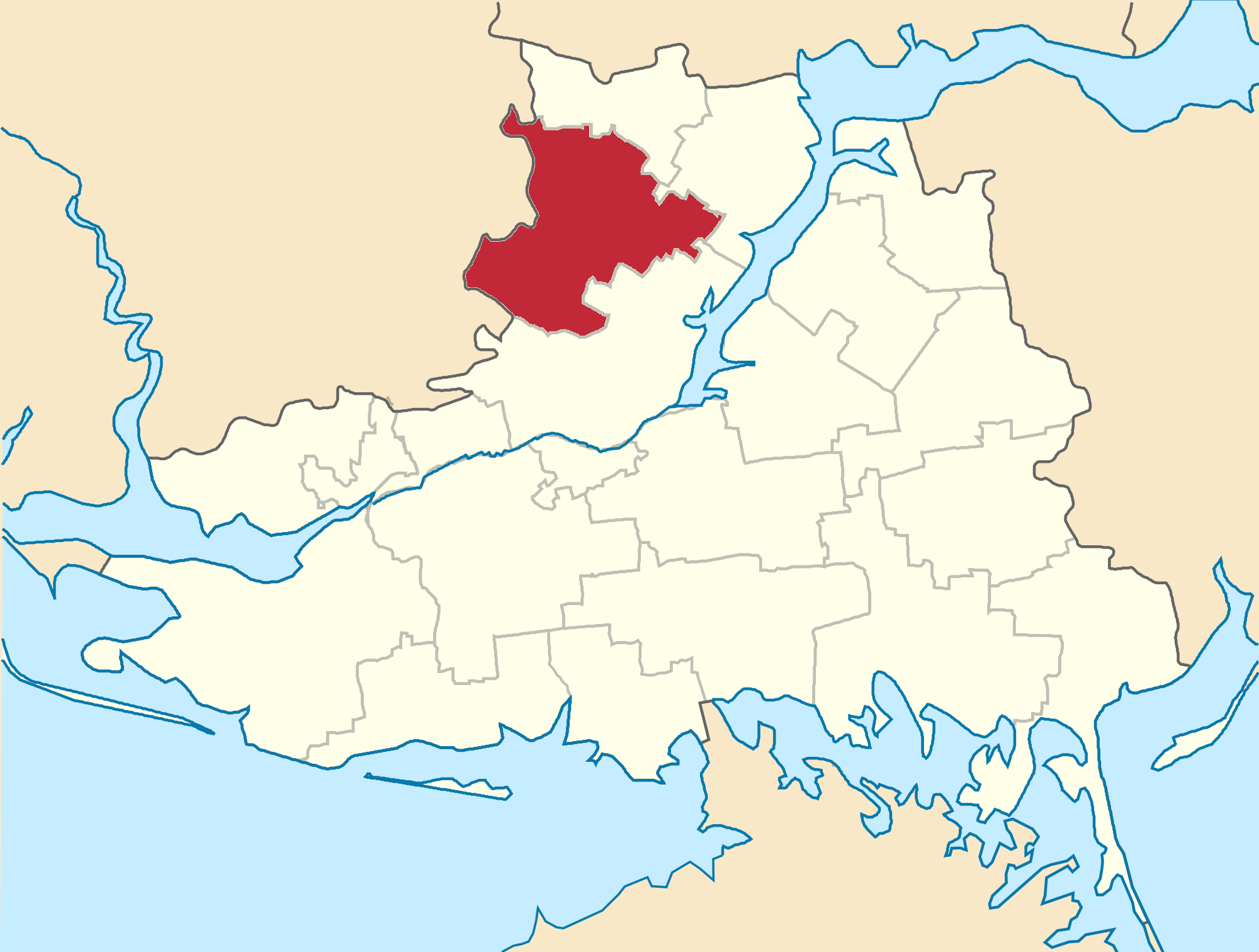
- Coordinates: 47°12′30.0342″N 33°16′24.1788″E
- Country: Ukraine
- Region: Kherson Oblast
- Established: 7 March 1923
- Disestablished: 18 July 2020
- Admin. center: Velyka Oleksandrivka
- Subdivisions: List: 0 — city councils; 4 — settlement councils; 16 — rural councils; Number of localities: 0 — cities; 4 — urban-type settlements; 54 — villages; — rural settlements

Government
  - Governor: Lyudmyla Berezhna

Area
  - Total: 1,541 km^{2} (595 sq mi)

Population (2020)
  - Total: 24,494 ▼
  - Density: 15.89/km^{2} (41.17/sq mi)
- Time zone: UTC+02:00 (EET)
  - Summer (DST): UTC+03:00 (EEST)
- Postal index: 74100—74155
- Area code: +380 5532

Velyka Oleksandrivka Raion (Ukrainian: Великоолександрівський район) was one of the 18 administrative raions (a district) of Kherson Oblast in southern Ukraine. Its administrative center was located in the urban-type settlement of Velyka Oleksandrivka. The raion was abolished on 18 July 2020 as part of the administrative reform of Ukraine, which reduced the number of raions of Kherson Oblast to five. The area of Velyka Oleksandrivka Raion was merged into Beryslav Raion. The last estimate of the raion population was 24,494 (2020 est.)

At the time of disestablishment, the raion consisted of three hromadas:

- Borozenske rural hromada with the administration in the selo of Borozenske;
- Kalynivske settlement hromada with the administration in the urban-type settlement of Kalynivske;
- Velyka Oleksandrivka settlement hromada with the administration in Velyka Oleksandrivka.

== List of villages ==
- Zelenyi Hai
