= Nizhnyi Rohachyk =

Village in Kherson Oblast, Ukraine

Nizhnyi Rohachyk Ни́жній Рога́чик
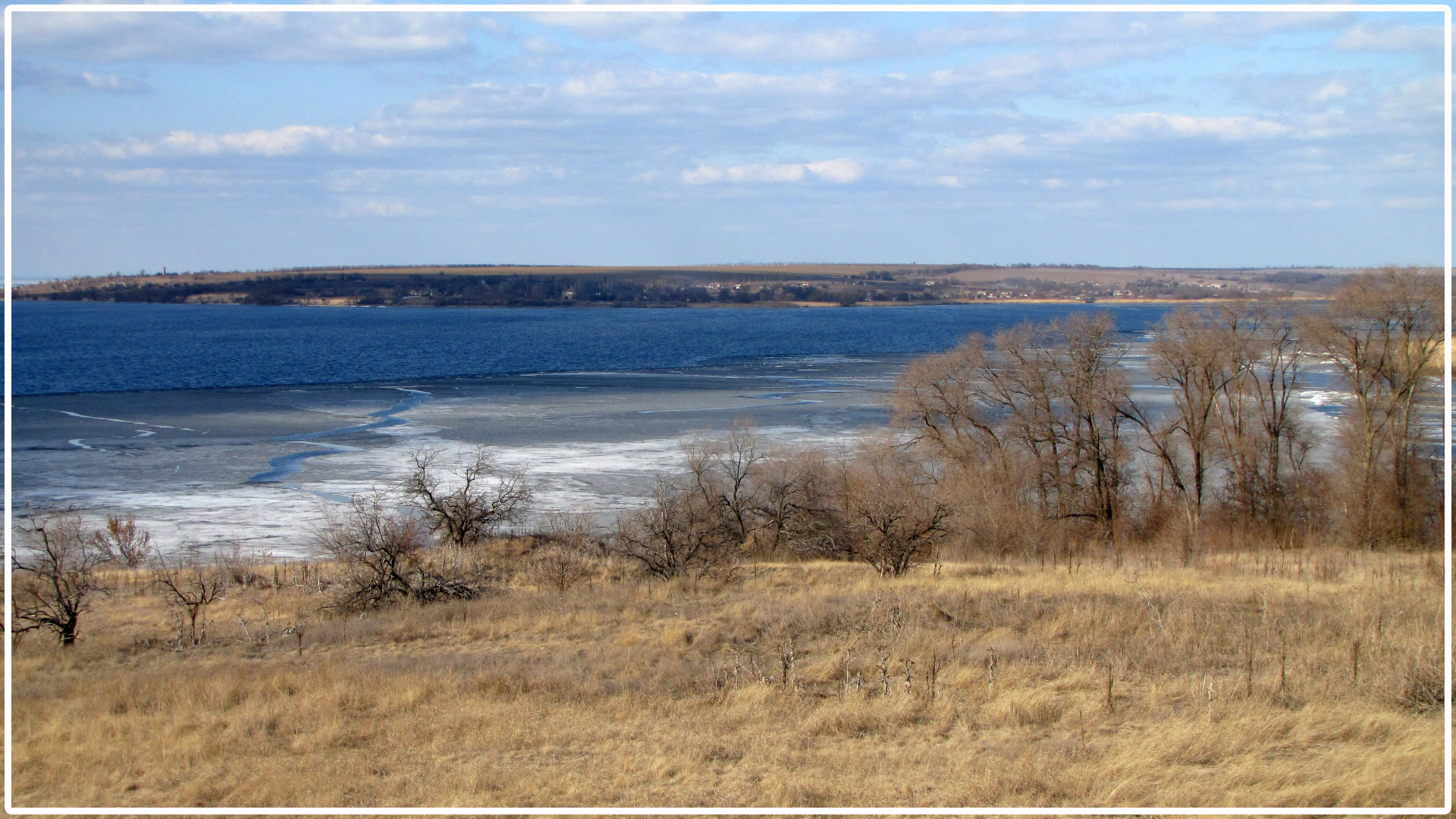
- View of Nizhnyi Rohachyk from across the Kakhovka Reservoir

- Location of Nizhnyi Rohachyk Nizhnyi Rohachyk (Ukraine)
- Coordinates: 47°20′38″N 34°1′55″E
- Country: Ukraine
- Oblast: Kherson Oblast
- Raion: Kakhovka Raion
- Hromada: Verkhniy Rohachyk settlement hromada

Government
  - Starosta: Ruslan Serhiyovich Chuprina

Area
  - Total: 1,489 km^{2} (575 sq mi)
- Elevation: 43 m (141 ft)

Population (2001)
  - Total: 305
  - Density: 202.82/km^{2} (525.3/sq mi)
- Postal code: 74412
- Area code: +380 5545

Nizhnyi Rohachyk (Ukrainian: Ни́жній Рога́чик) is a village in Kakhovka Raion, Kherson Oblast, Ukraine. As of 2001, the village had 305 residents.

== History ==
In 1886, 955 people lived in the village. Nizhnyi Rohacyk served as the center of Nizhnyi Rohachyk volost in Melitopolsky Uyezd of the Russian Empire. The volost comprised four villages: Babina (now Babyne), Karaydubina (now Berezhanka), Ushkalka, and Nizhnyi Rohachyk.

Nizhnyi Rohachyk was occupied by Russian troops on February 26, 2022, during the Russian invasion of Ukraine. It remains occupied as part of the Russian occupation of Kherson Oblast.

== Demographics ==
The 1989 Ukrainian SSR census put Nizhnyi Rohachyk's population at 327 people. 138 residents were men and 189 were women. The population had diminished to 305 people in the 2001 Ukrainian census. In the 2001 census, 96.36% of the village's population stated Ukrainian was their native language, 2.98% said Russian was their native language, and 0.66% stated Belarusian was their native language.

== Notable people ==
- Antonina Bablii (born 1949), a Ukrainian artist
- Taisia Shcherba (born 1943), a Ukrainian poet and novelist
- Hryhoriy Navrotskyi (1902–1971), a Soviet rear admiral during WWII
