= Apostolove =

City in Dnipropetrovsk Oblast, Ukraine

Apostolove Апостолове
- City
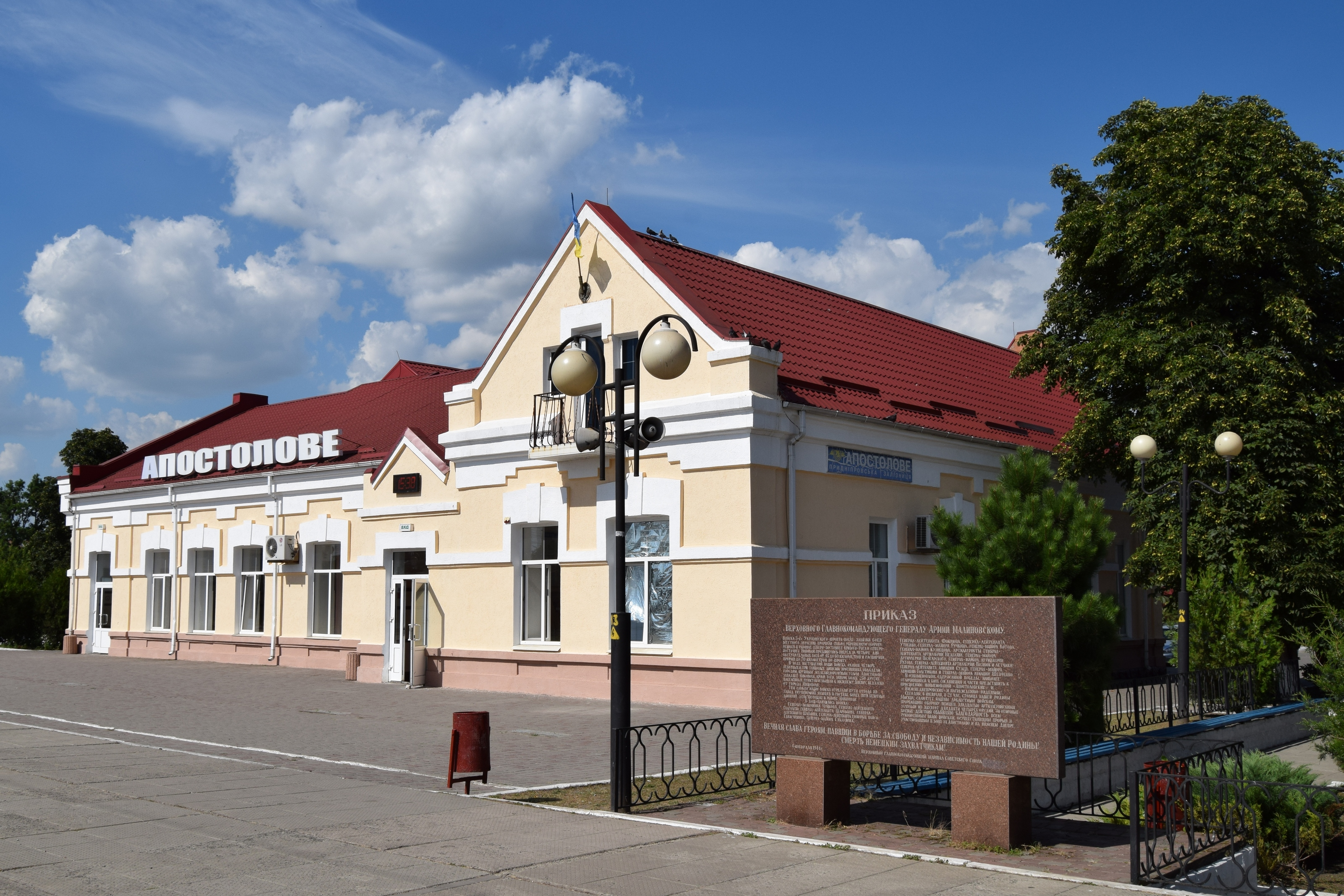
- Apostolove railway station

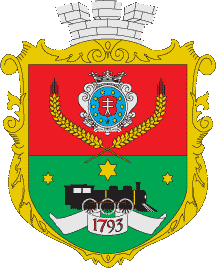
- Flag Coat of arms
- Interactive map of Apostolove
- Location of Apostolove Apostolove (Ukraine)
- Coordinates: 47°39′34″N 33°43′00″E
- Country: Ukraine
- Oblast: Dnipropetrovsk Oblast
- Raion: Kryvyi Rih Raion
- Hromada: Apostolove urban hromada
- Established: 1793

Area
  - Total: 15 km^{2} (5.8 sq mi)

Population (2001)
  - Total: 16,356
  - Density: 1,100/km^{2} (2,800/sq mi)
- Postal code: 53800-53804

Apostolove (Ukrainian: Апостолове, IPA: [ɐˈpɔstoɫowe]; Russian: Апо́столово) is a city in Kryvyi Rih Raion, Dnipropetrovsk Oblast, Ukraine. It hosts the administration of Apostolove urban hromada, one of the hromadas of Ukraine. Population: 13,069 (2022 estimate). In 2001, the population was 16,439.

Until the raion was abolished on 18 July 2020, Apostolove was the administrative center of Apostolove Raion. After that date the town became part of Kryvyi Rih Raion.

== Names ==
- until 1824 Voshyve (after the local stream)
- 1824—1933 Pokrovske (after the temple of the Intercession of the Theotokos (Pokrova))
- 1933—1936 Apostolove (after the local train station)
- 1936—1938 Kosiorove (after Stanislav Kosior)
- 1938—1939 Yezhovsk (after Nikolai Yezhov)

== History ==
During the Ukrainian War of Independence, from 1917 to 1920, it passed between various factions. Afterwards it was administratively part of the Katerynoslav Governorate of Ukraine.

== Demographics ==
Ethnic composition of the town as of 2001:

Ethnic groups in Apostolove
	percent
Ukrainians	86.97%
Russians	9.42%
Belarusians	1.18%
Armenians	0.13%
Moldovans	0.08%
Azerbaijanis	0.08%
Germans	0.07%

== Gallery ==
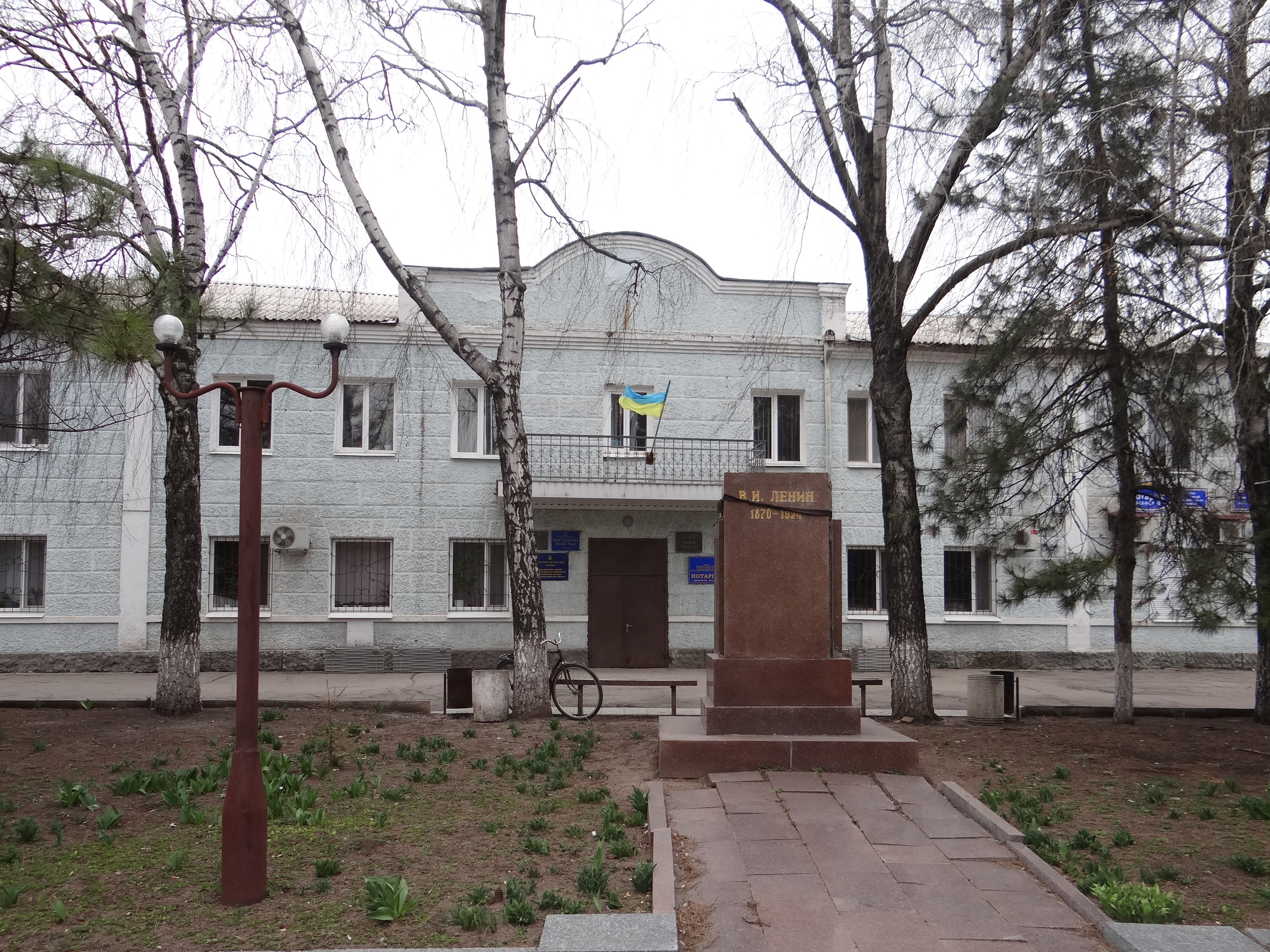
Apostolove city hall

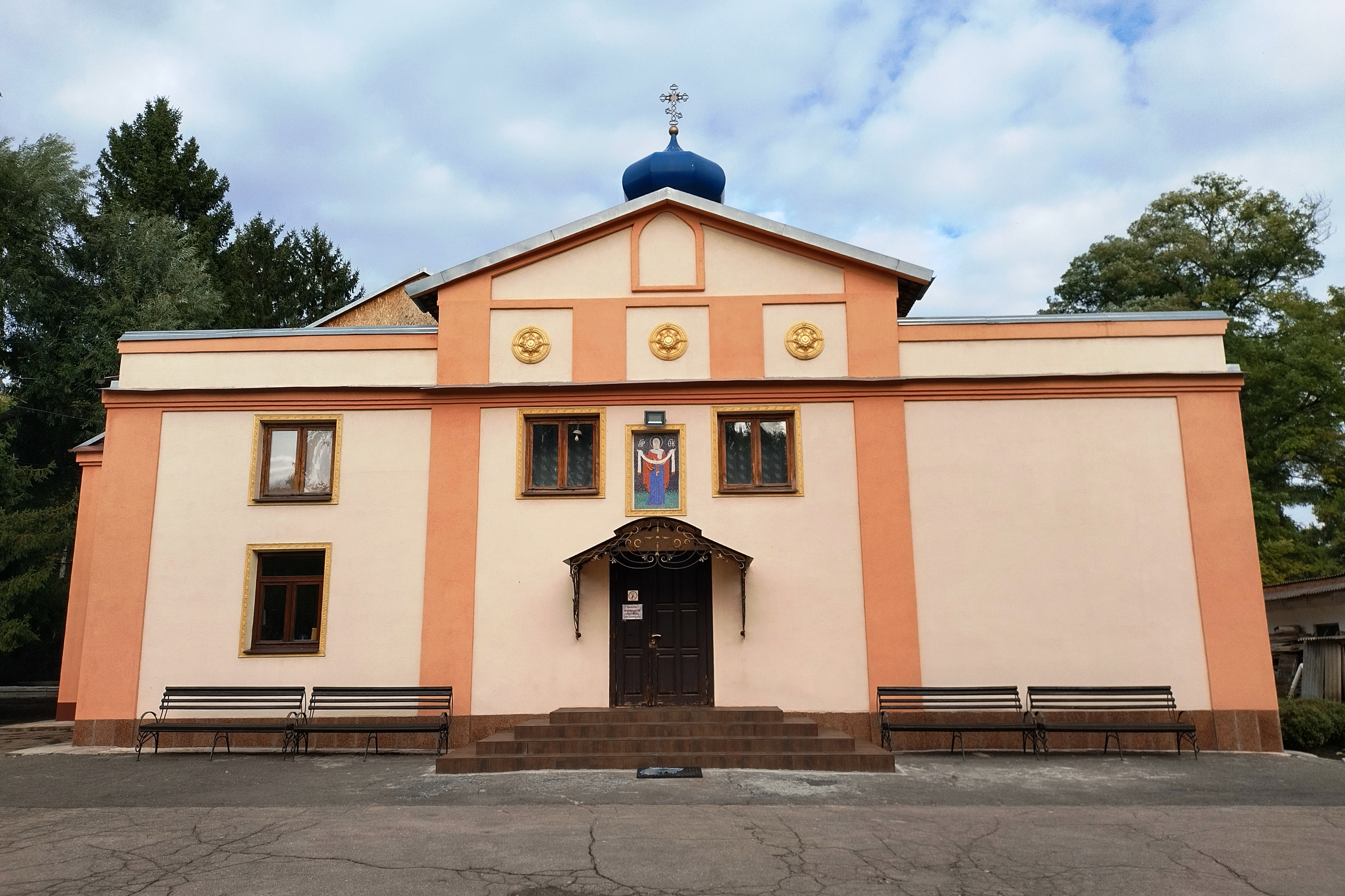
Twelve apostles church

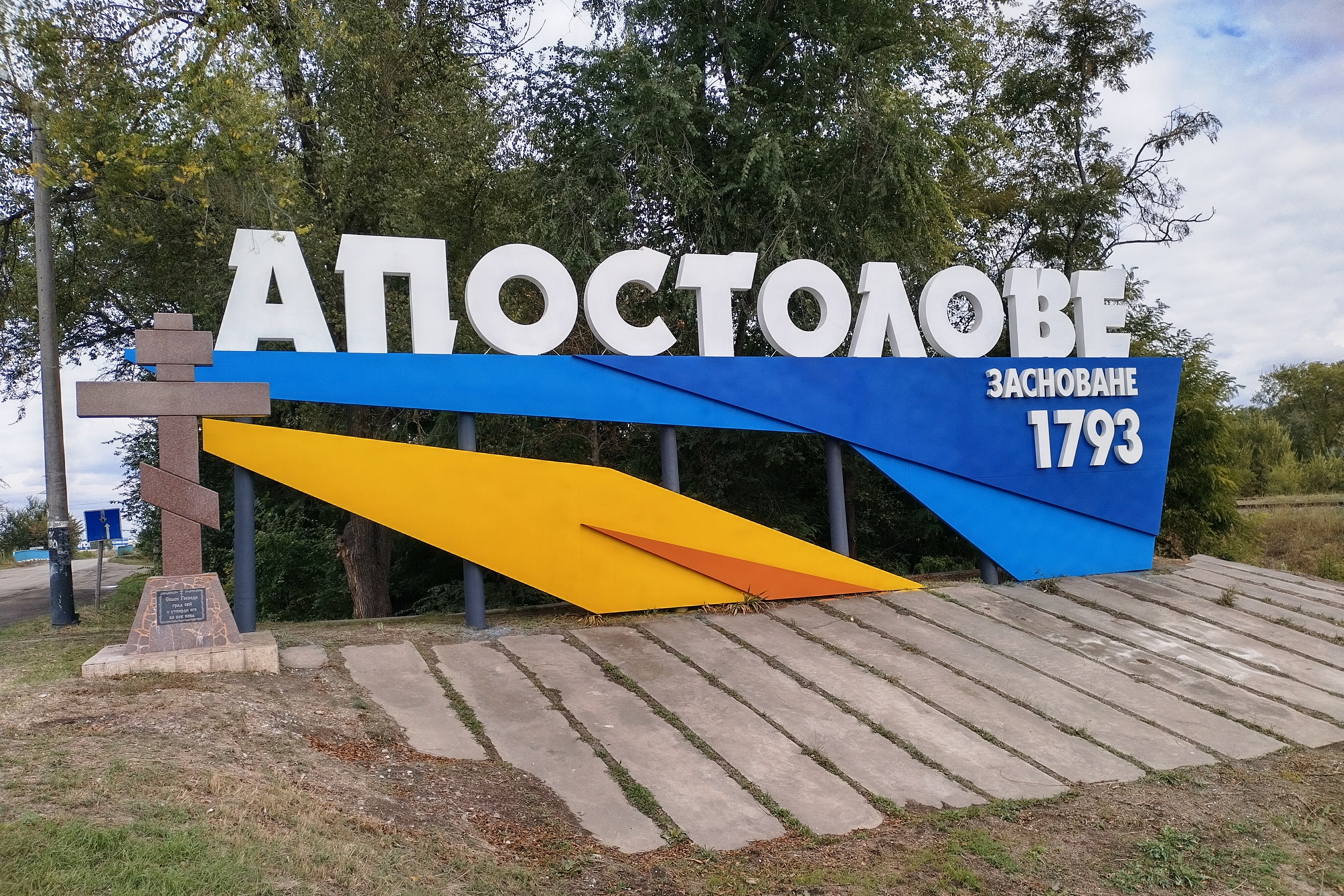
Stela at the entrance to the city

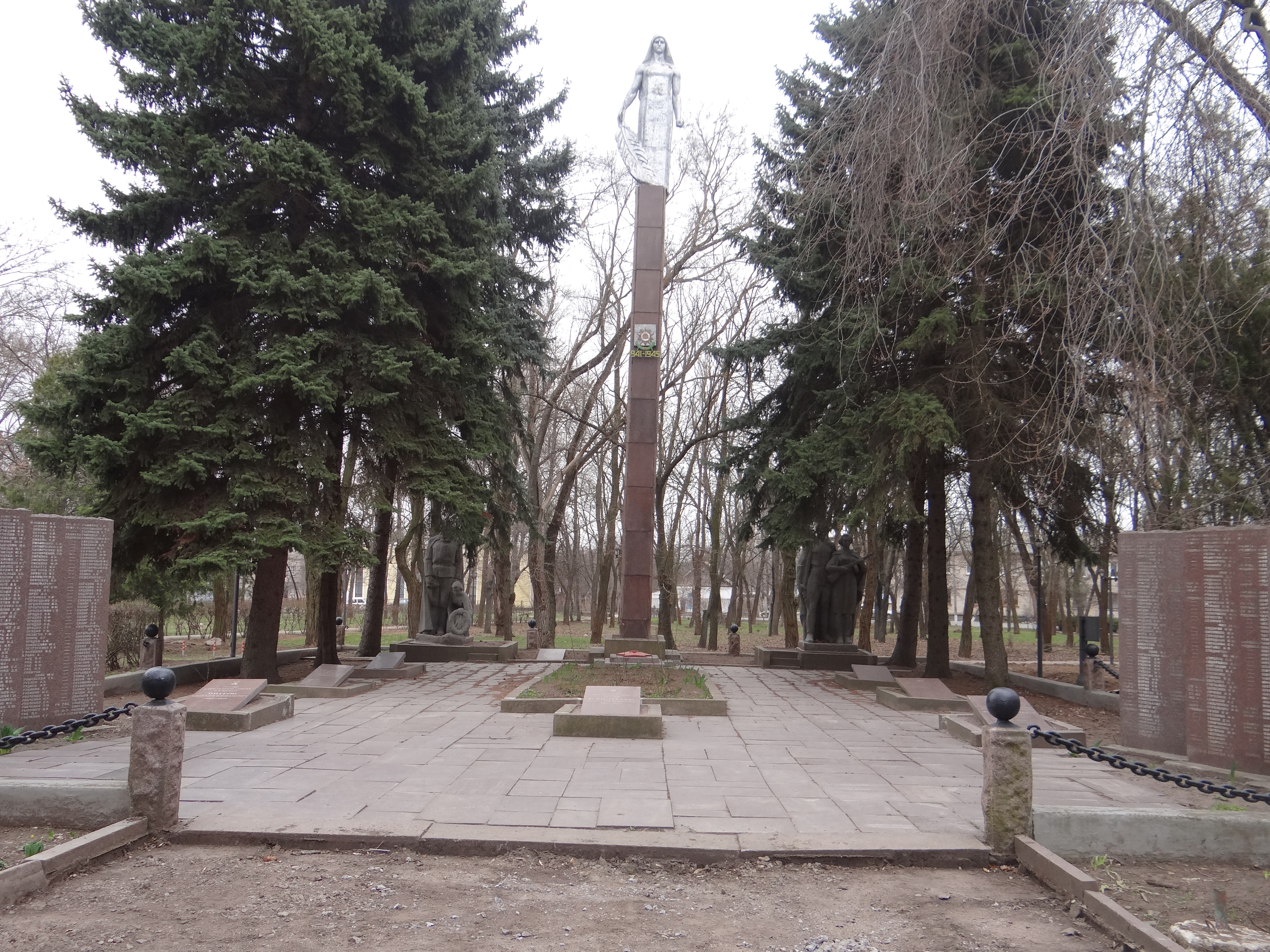
War Memorial in Central Park

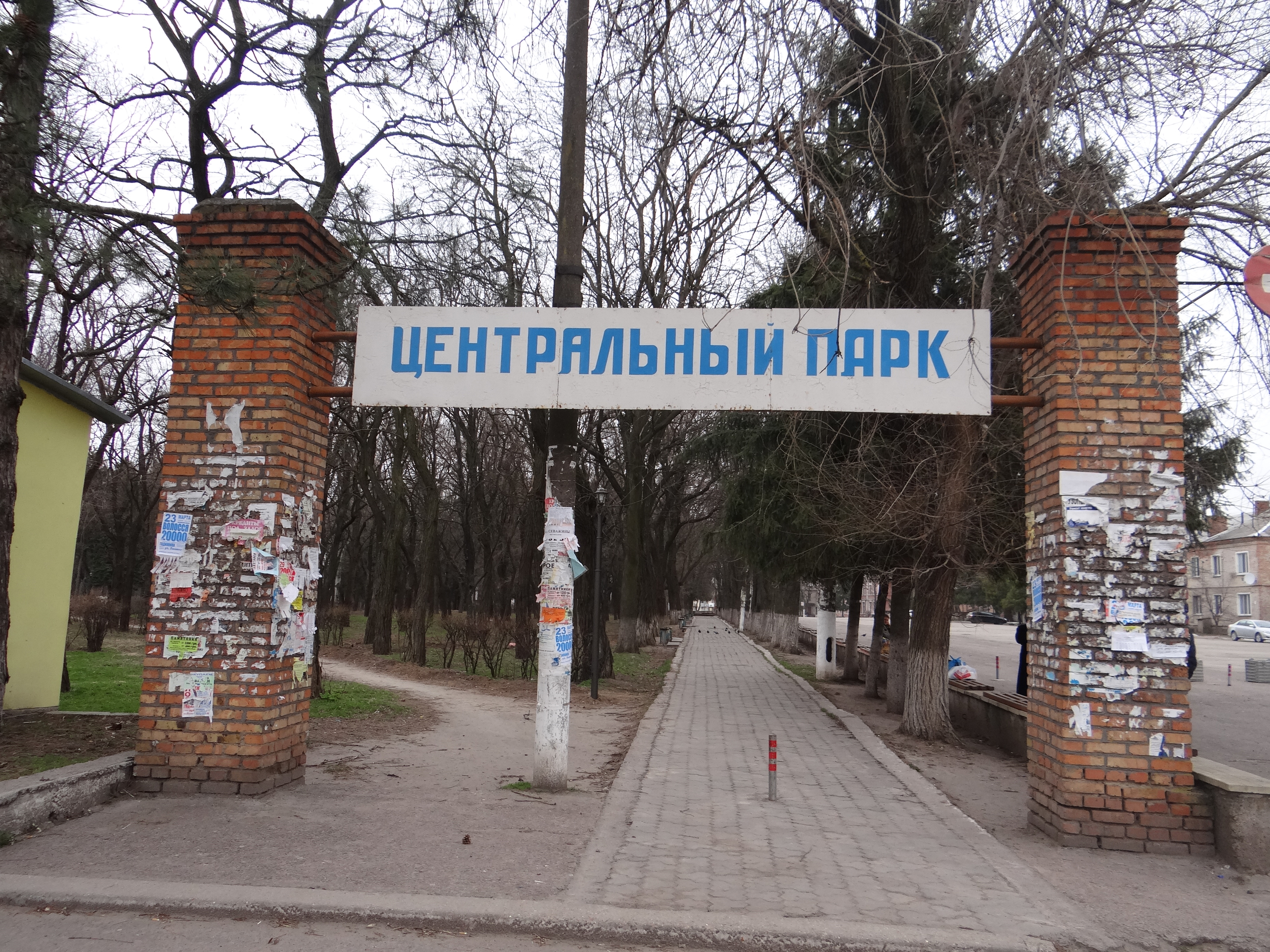
Entrance to the Central Park

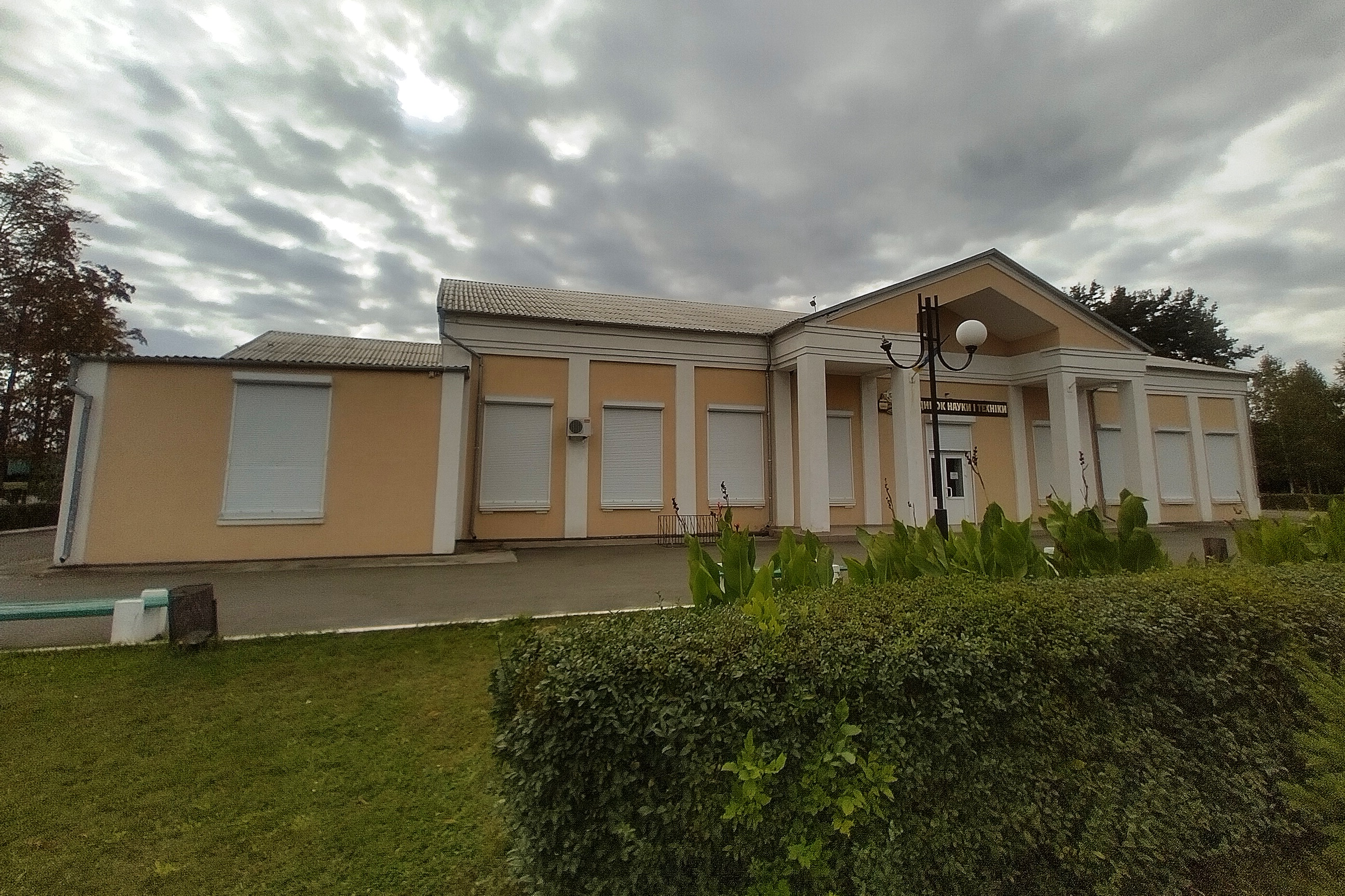
House of Science and Technology

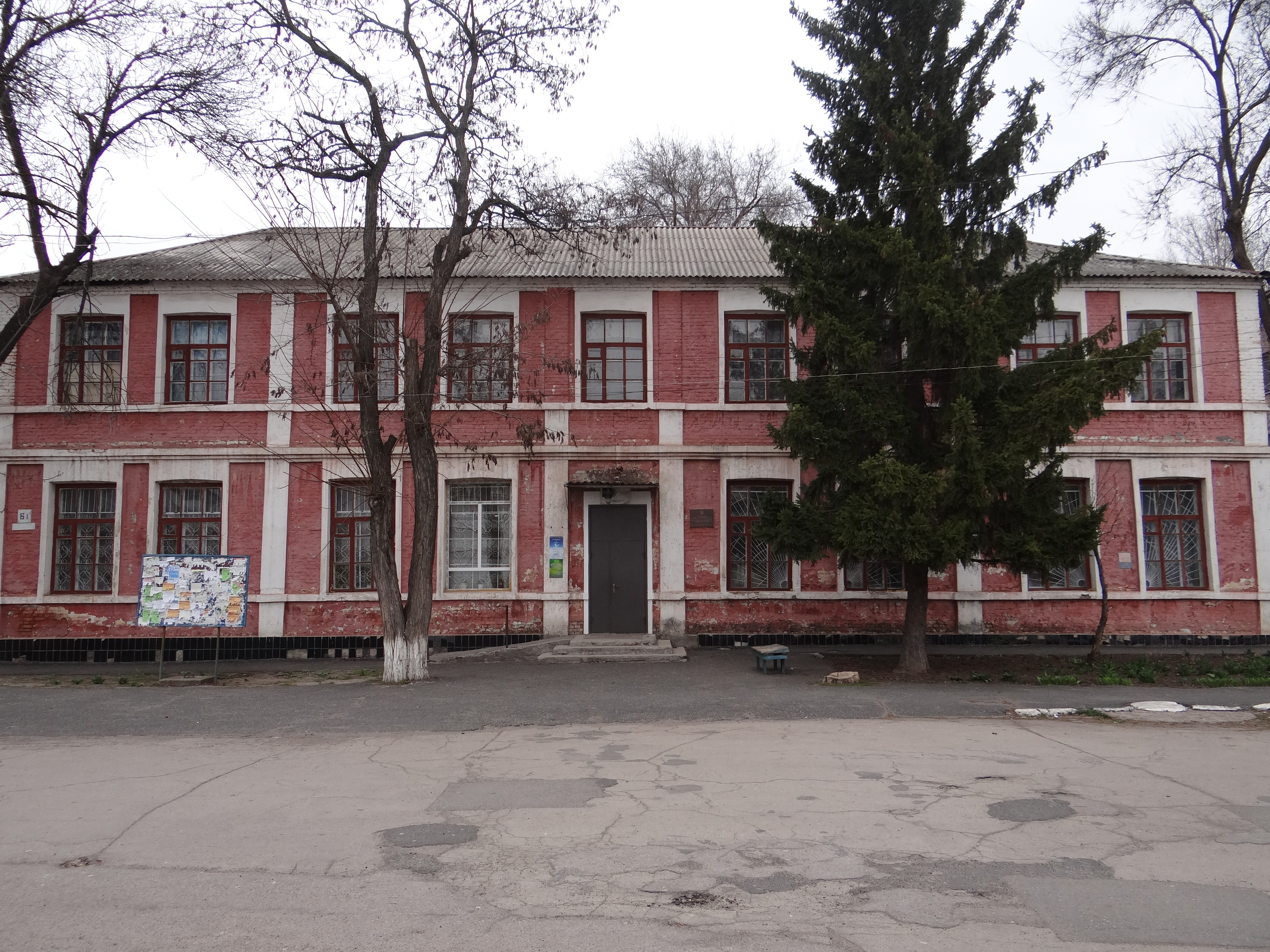
Historical and local history museum

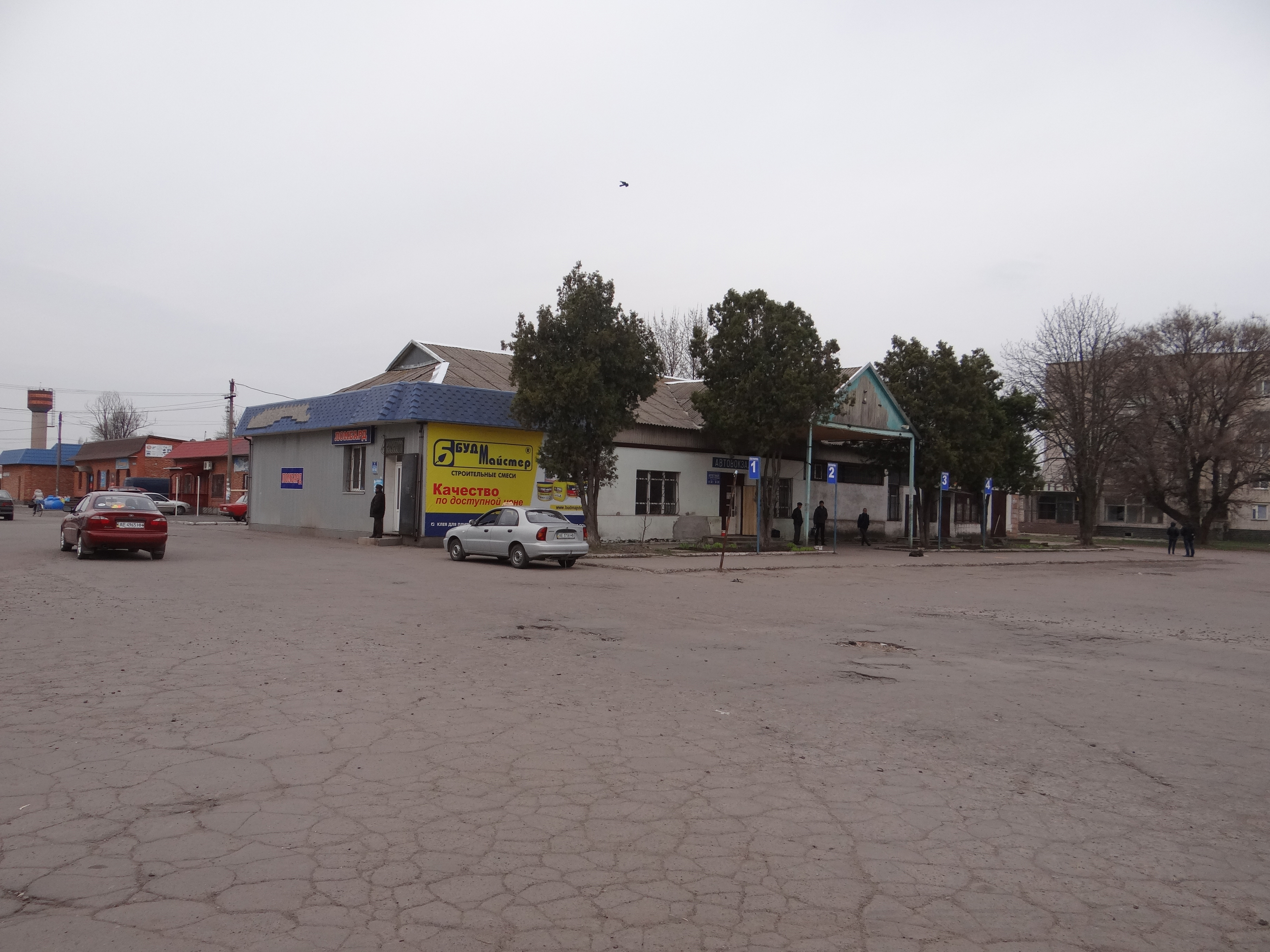
Bus station
