= Beryslav Raion =

Subdivision of Kherson Oblast, Ukraine

Beryslav Raion Бериславський район
- Raion
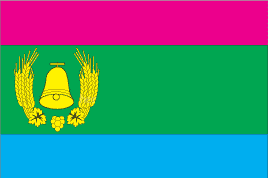
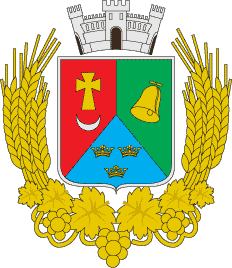
- Flag Coat of arms

- Interactive map of Beryslav Raion
- Coordinates: 46°50′29″N 33°25′46″E
- Country: Ukraine
- Oblast: Kherson Oblast
- Established: March 7, 1923
- Admin. center: Beryslav
- Subdivisions: 11 hromadas

Government
  - Governor: Yuriy Sydorenko

Area
  - Total: 4,747.1 km^{2} (1,832.9 sq mi)

Population (2022)
  - Total: 94,103
  - Density: 19.823/km^{2} (51.342/sq mi)
- Time zone: UTC+02:00 (EET)
  - Summer (DST): UTC+03:00 (EEST)
- Postal index: 74300—74372
- Area code: +380 5546

Beryslav Raion (Ukrainian: Бериславський район, romanized: Beryslavs'kyi raion) is one of the five administrative raions (a district) of Kherson Oblast in southern Ukraine. Its administrative center is located in the city of Beryslav. Its population was 55,976 as of the 2001 Ukrainian Census. Current population: 94,103 (2022 estimate).

The January 2020 estimate of the raion population was 45,931 (2020 est.). However, on 18 July 2020, as part of the administrative reform of Ukraine, the number of raions of Kherson Oblast was reduced to five, and the area of Beryslav Raion was significantly expanded. Three raions (Novovorontsovka, Velyka Oleksandrivka, and Vysokopillia Raions) were abolished and their territories were merged into an enlarged Beryslav Raion.

== Subdivisions ==
=== Current ===
After the reform in July 2020, the raion consisted of 11 hromadas:

- Beryslav urban hromada with the administration in the city of Beryslav, retained from Beryslav Raion;
- Borozenske rural hromada with the administration in the selo of Borozenske, transferred from Velyka Oleksandrivka Raion;
- Kalynivske settlement hromada with the administration in the rural settlement of Kalynivske, transferred from Velyka Oleksandrivka Raion;
- Kochubeivka rural hromada with the administration in the selo of Kochubeivka, transferred from Vysokopillia Raion;
- Mylove rural hromada with the administration in the selo of Mylove, retained from Beryslav Raion;
- Novooleksandrivka rural hromada with the administration in the selo of Novooleksandrivka, transferred from Novovorontsovka Raion;
- Novoraisk rural hromada with the administration in the settlement of Novoraisk, retained from Beryslav Raion;
- Novovorontsovka settlement hromada with the administration in the rural settlement of Novovorontsovka, transferred from Novovorontsovka Raion;
- Tiahynka rural hromada with the administration in the settlement of Tiahynka, retained from Beryslav Raion;
- Velyka Oleksandrivka settlement hromada with the administration in the rural settlement of Velyka Oleksandrivka, transferred from Velyka Oleksandrivka Raion.
- Vysokopillia settlement hromada with the administration in the rural settlement of Vysokopillia, transferred from Vysokopillia Raion;

=== Before 2020 ===
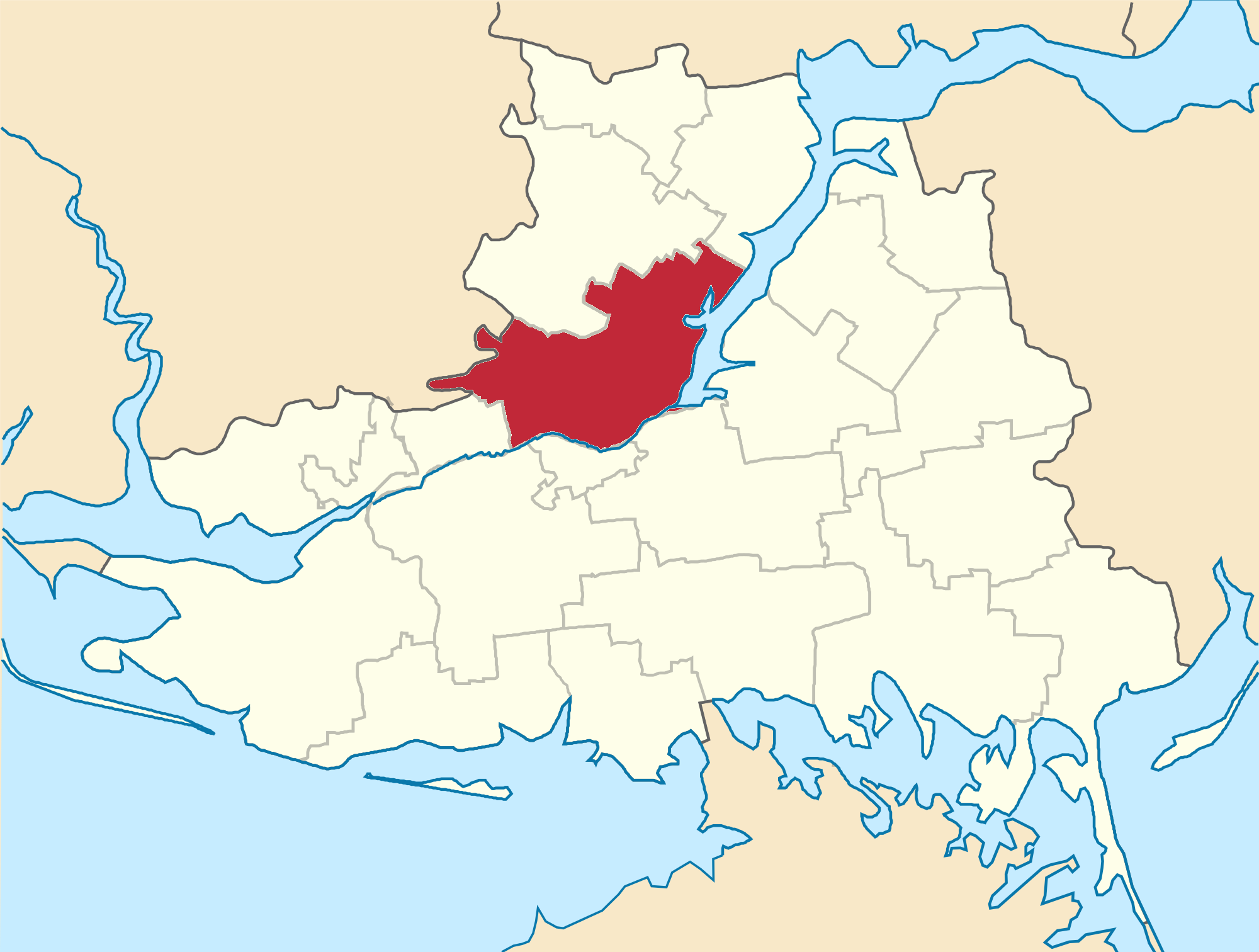
Beryslav Raion in Kherson Oblast before 2020

Before the 2020 reform, the raion consisted of four hromadas:

- Beryslav urban hromada with the administration in Beryslav;
- Mylove rural hromada with the administration in Mylove;
- Novoraisk rural hromada with the administration in Novoraisk;
- Tiahynka rural hromada with the administration in Tiahynka.

Beryslav Raion was divided in a way that followed the general administrative scheme in Ukraine. Local government was also organized along a similar scheme nationwide. Consequently, raions were subdivided into councils, which were the prime level of administrative division in the country.

Each of the raion's urban localities administered their own councils, often containing a few other villages within its jurisdiction. However, only a handful of rural localities were organized into councils, which also might contain a few villages within its jurisdiction.

Accordingly, Beryslav Raion was divided into:

- 1 city council—made up of the city of Beryslav (administrative center)
- 1 settlement council—made up of the urban-type settlement of Kozatske
- 29 village councils

Overall, the raion had a total of 43 populated localities, consisting of one city, one urban-type settlement, 34 villages, and seven rural settlements.

== Geography ==
Beryslav Raion is located in the central part of Kherson Oblast on the right-bank of the Dnieper River and the Kakhovka Reservoir. Geographically, it lies in the lowland immediately before the Black Sea.

== History ==
Beryslav Raion was first established on March 7, 1923 as part of a full-scale administrative reorganization of the Ukrainian Soviet Socialist Republic. During the 2022 Russian invasion of Ukraine, almost the whole of Beryslav Raion was initially occupied by Russian forces, apart from a few villages in the north of the raion. However, by late October 2022 the majority of the rural districts had been re-taken by Ukrainian forces, although the city of Beryslav remained in Russian hands as of 29 October. The rest of the raion was retaken on 10 November 2022, when the Russian troops withdrew from the right bank of the Dnieper.

== See also ==
- Vysoke, Kherson Oblast
