= List of food and drink monuments =

This is a list of monuments to objects erected for their important role in food and drink for particular populations, as well as monumental/sculpture works of contemporary art. They are found in various places around the world.

== Commemorative ==
=== Russia ===
- Monument to Kursk antonovka established in 2008 in Kursk, Russia. Antonovka is a late-fall or early-winter Russian apple cultivar, well suited to the Russian climate.
- The three meter tall bronze monument to Chocolate, commonly known as Chocolate Fairy (Russian: Шоколадная фея), was erected in Pokrov, Vladimir Oblast, Russia near the Museum of Chocolate in 2009.
- Monument to "Friendship" processed cheese was established by processed cheese plant Karat in 2005. "Friendship" is one of the earliest processed cheeses in the Soviet Union. Being a cheap brand, it has become a staple snack for vodka, as they say, "in field conditions". Media related to Monument to processed cheese in Moscow at Wikimedia Commons
- Monument to pelmeni in Miass, Russia, by the Pelmeni Museum Pelmeni are a kind of dumplings originated somewhere in Siberia. They have been described as "the heart of Russian cuisine". They are convenient, easy to preserve prefabricated snacks historically popular with hunters during the winter time.
- Tula pryanik monument established in Tula, Russia in 2014, Tula pryanik, a symbol of Tula, in addition to famous Tula firearms, is known since 1685. Media related to Monument of Pryanik at Wikimedia Commons
- Monument to the siege stickleback established a Kotlin Island near Saint Petersburg in 2005. Stickleback is a small bony fish, normally not suitable for commercial fishing and generally considered to be "pest fish", therefore its population was not depleted in the Baltic Sea during World War II, and the residents of the besieged Leningrad and Kronstadt used makeshift implements to fish stickleback. This significantly contributed to the survival in Leningrad and Kronstadt.
- Monument to walrus established in Arkhangelsk in 2010. Its full name is "Monument to Walrus, the Savior of the Residents of Arkhangelsk and Besieged Leningrad".

=== Ukraine ===
- Monument to varenyk: Varenyky, also known as pierogi, is a popular national Ukrainian dish. It was established in Cherkasy, Ukraine in 2006.
- Monument to orange: It was established in Odesa, Ukraine in 2004 the Odesa City Day, to commemorate a gift from Odesa citizens to Emperor Paul I of Russia. It is also informally known as a "monument to bribe": It was known that Emperor Paul disliked the city, and the gift allegedly made Paul permit a credit for the finishing the construction of the Odesa port. Media related to Monument to Orange at Wikimedia Commons
- Sculpture of Poltava halushki, established in Poltava, Ukraine. Halushki (a variety of dumplings) is a traditional dish in Ukrainian cuisine, as well as in other nearby cuisines. Media related to Sculpture of halushki in Poltava at Wikimedia Commons
- Monument to Potato Pancake in Korosten, Zhytomyr Oblast. Potato pancakes are a staple of East Slavic cuisine (and in many other cuisines as well).
- Kherson Watermelon Monument, of height 4 meters was established in 1988 by Osokorivka, Kherson Oblast, Ukraine, from the series "Gifts of Kherson Region" Kherson watermelon is a protected geographical appellation.
- Monument to Nizhyn cucumber: Nizhyn, Chernihiv Oblast, Ukraine is famous for his Nizhyn cucumbers.
- Monument to a pig, Romny, Ukraine, 2000, 50.752193°N 33.48642°E: in honor of the animals that saved the people of this land from hunger
- On the second floor of the Museum of Salo, Ukraine there is a monument to salo made of Italian marble, with an inscription in gold "Salo is salo" in several languages.

=== Elsewhere ===
- Media related to Monuments and memorials to mate (beverage) at Wikimedia Commons
- Media related to Monuments and memorials to sherry at Wikimedia Commons

==== Europe ====
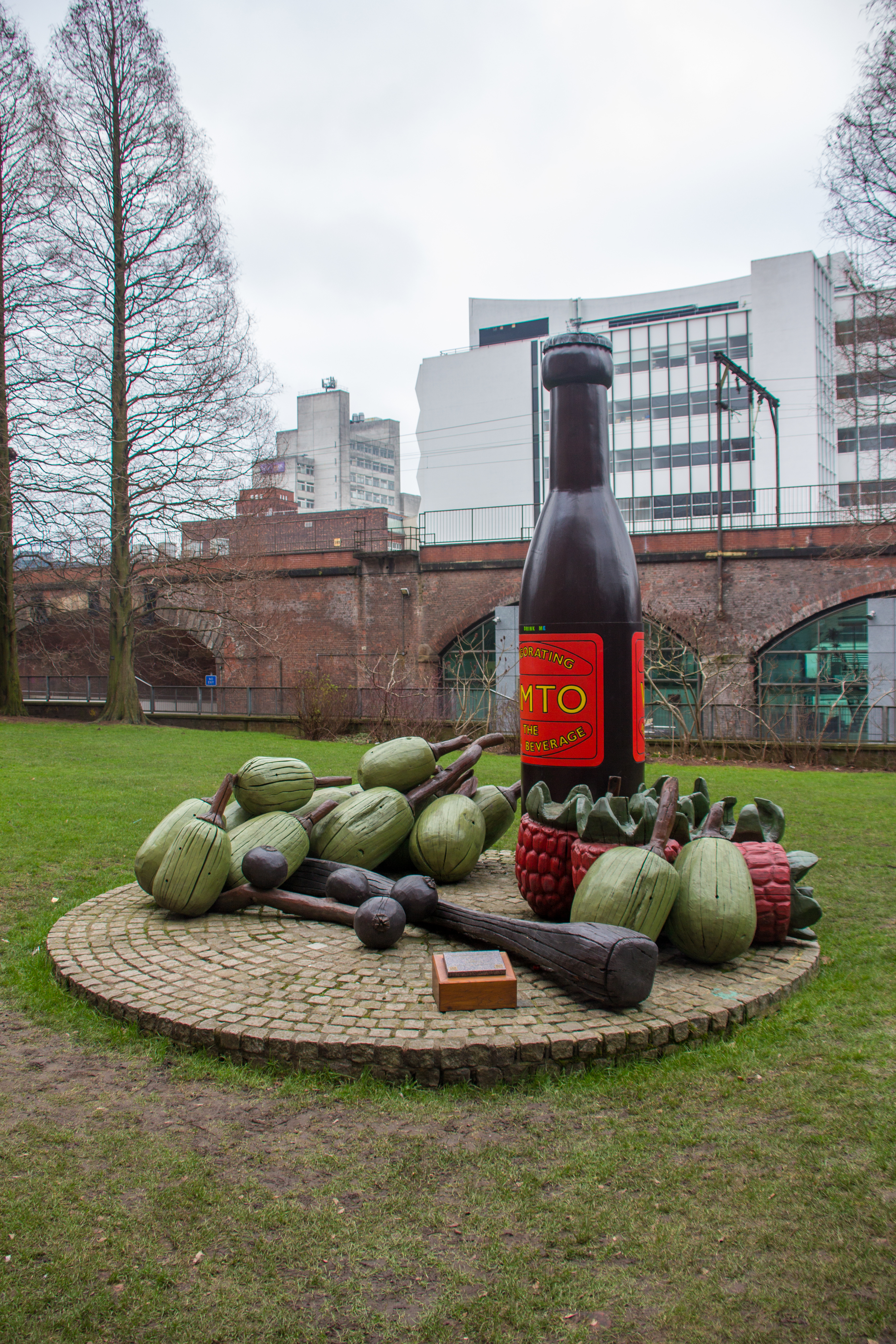
Vimto monument on Granby Row at the University of Manchester

- An oak sculpture entitled "A Monument to Vimto" was created by Kerry Morrison and installed on Granby Row–the location of the original Vimto premises–in central Manchester in 1992. The statue was restored and repainted in 2011.
- ICAR Canned Beef Monument, a memorial to the international food aid delivered during the Siege of Sarajevo

==== North America ====
- Pig Monument, Oconee, Georgia, United States, 32.8349753°N 82.9396652°W. A granite historical marker to honor an event during the Great Depression when food was scarce: a pig fell into a deep dry well, the owner started filling the well with dirt to raise its level to get the pig out, and the neighbors helped him.

==== Oceania ====
- The Springfield Doughnut, a giant, pink, sprinkled doughnut presented to Springfield, New Zealand by 20th Century Fox to promote the 2007 film The Simpsons Movie.

== Decorative ==
- From the Giants of the Prairies roadside attractions series:
  - World's Largest Pirohy monument in Glendon, Alberta, Canada
  - World's Largest Kielbasa monument in Mundare, Alberta, Canada
  - World's Largest Coke Can monument in Portage la Prairie, Manitoba, Canada
- Claes Oldenburg, a Swedish-born American sculptor is best known for his public art installations depicting everyday objects – articles of clothing and food items. Food examples include Floor Burger (a 700-pound soft sculpture of a burger topped with a sliced pickle was initially called Giant Hamburger, first time installed in New York), Floor Cone, and Floor Cake (all 1962), made of foam-rubber and covered in canvas and vinyl. Later: Dropped Cone (a giant ice cream cone on top of a corner of the Neumarkt shopping mall), Cologne, 2001 Spoonbridge and Cherry, Walker Art Center, Minneapolis, MN, US, Apple core, The Israel Museum, Jerusalem, 1992 He also authored quite a few sculptures of baked potato. Media related to Claes Oldenburg at Wikimedia Commons.
- There are many statues and monuments to roosters and chicken in the United States. Quite a few of them were manufactured on an industrial scale, e.g., by the International Fiberglass (1963–1974), to decorate various fast food and poultry establishments.
- Turkeys have their own share of glory in the United States. Of note is "Jack the Turkey", a monument in Hartford, Connecticut to the first turkey "pardoned" by President Abraham Lincoln in 1863. There are much more of them monumental turkeys spotted by RoadsideArchitecture.com maintained by Debra Jane Seltzer.

== See also ==
- Food art
- Butter sculpture
- Sugar sculpture
