= Food art =

Set of artistic practices using food as a creative material

Food art is a type of art that depicts food, drink, or edible objects as the medium or subject matter of an artistic work to create an attractive visual display or provide social critique. It can be presented in two-dimensional or three-dimensional format, like painting or sculpture. Food art can also incorporate food as a medium.

Contemporary food artists have experimented using different methods and techniques like photography to change its purpose and use it as a source of story telling, humour and highlighting contemporary issues, such as racism and political activism. Some food art works use materials, like stone, to replicate food.

== Characteristics ==
Food art works possess their own characteristics that differentiate them from how food is traditionally perceived to be used. They have their own features in terms of how they appear to the onlooker, the experience they offer to the public and their meaning.

=== Visual ===
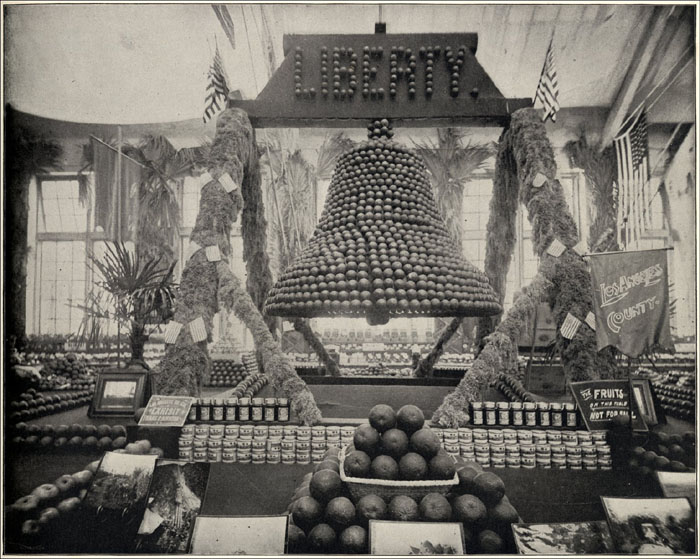
The Ripe Fruit of Freedom. Liberty Bell made of fruit. Interior of Agricultural Building. From Columbian Gallery: A Portfolio of Photographs of the World's Fair by The Werner Company. 1893.

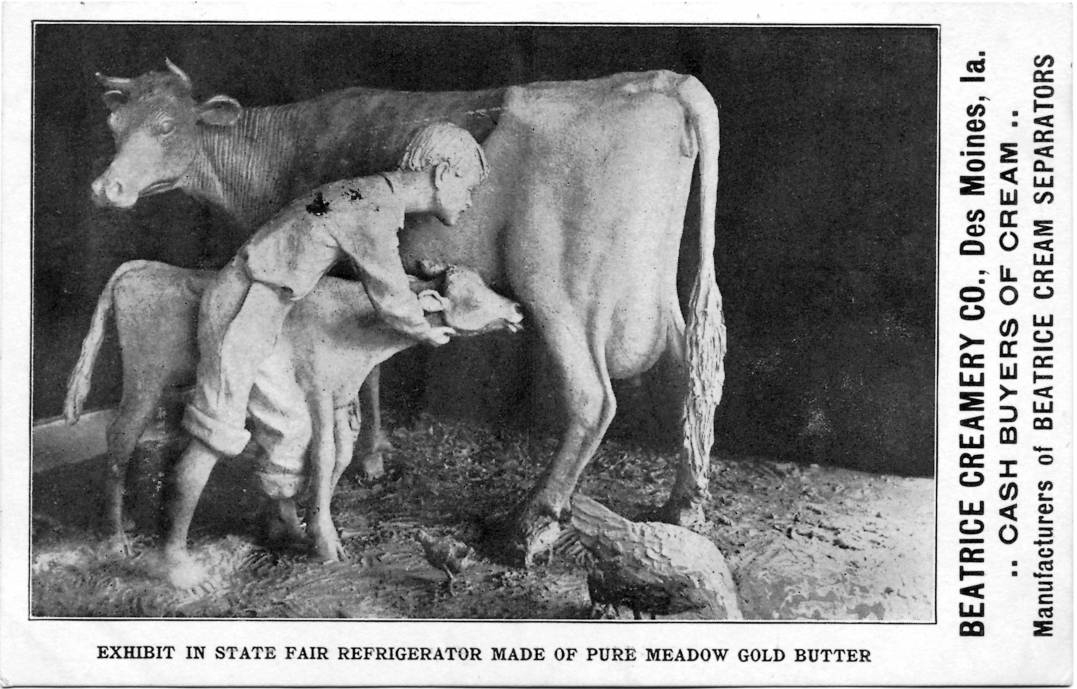
Postcard of John K. Daniels’s butter sculpture of a boy, cow, and calf, Iowa State Fair, 1904. Sponsored by Beatrice Creamery Co.

Foodstuffs can be made into visual objects which can be considered as works of art, since they are not necessarily intended to be eaten. Sculpture made from butter, sugar, corn and other agricultural products was a common feature at fairs in the later 19th and early 20th century

Whereas, the latter half of the 20th century and the 21st century saw the use of digital photography increase and be used as a new means to reach its audiences through modern art. Typically used in the commercial setting, food photography captures the still life representation of food used for advertisements, packaging, magazines and menus. Social media platforms like Instagram and TikTok have allowed artists and amateur users to share their creations easily online and start trends like #foodporn and #instafood as a result.

=== Performance ===
Traditional food art creations are portrayed in two-dimensional still life form, but some contemporary food artists have experimented using performance as a form of expression to transform our understanding of troubling issues.

Red Hong Yi (also known as 'Red'), a Malaysian artist and architect, recreated plate-sized portraiture entirely out of food. So far, Red has created works depicting Ai Weiwei's face from sunflower seeds, Jay Chou out of coffee stains and other contemporary Chinese icons out of various objects. As well as humour, artistic works challenge current global and political issues with her most recent project involves a series of portraits of Asian individuals out of foodstuff such as cake sprinkles and matcha leaves titled "I am not a virus." This series attempted to address anti-Asian racism and violence around the world, especially following the Coronavirus pandemic.

=== Viewer Participation ===
Food art can question, surprise and engage the visitor by prioritising social interactions and participation in the event to form discussion of the subject matter. In 1962, Alison Knowles, a founder of Fluxus, visual and performance artist debuted her artwork, Make a Salad (also referred to as Proposition #1: Make a Salad), at the Institute of Contemporary Arts in London. It has since been recreated at various different venues, such as the Tate Modern in 2008, the High Line in 2012, the Walker Art Center and most recently Art Basel in 2016. Make a Salad involved Knowles and the participants preparing and tossing vast quantities of vegetables in dressing and then serving it to the spectators. At the time of its original showing, impresario, John Cage, coined the work to be "New Music".

Furthermore, in 1992, Thai artist Rirkrit Tiravanija staged an event in New York's 303 Gallery with the intention of "bringing people together". While there, Tiravanija's work called Untitled (free) consisted of him serving free bowls of pad thai curry and rice to gallery goers to encourage a social environment where participants came together to take part in the activity.

=== Meaning ===
The meaning of food in the traditional sense is to be used functionally and to provide nourishment by being eaten. Artistic works that use food as a medium can be representational and express emotions metaphorically, as according to art critic Carolyn Korsmeyer, it can provide a perspective on what it symbolises. However, it can also be unclear generally due to its transient form. Their interpretation would be reliant on the timing of which the visitor explores the artwork.

== Artists who depict or use food ==
=== Leonardo da Vinci, The Last Supper (1495–1498) ===
The Painting represents the scene of the Last Supper of Jesus with his disciples from the Gospel of John, 13:21 where he announced that one of them would betray him. It is thought to have been painted between 1495 and 1498. Despite the painting focusing on Judas' betrayal, the depictions of the meal features the dense symbolism of the story with bread and wine incorporated to represent the body and blood of Christ, which he sacrificed on behalf of mankind. Furthermore, plates of fruit and fish, likely eels or herring are displayed upon the tablecloth. Researchers have suggested that although eels would not have been served at the original meal, it is symbolic and popular during the Renaissance period when Leonardo da Vinci produced it.

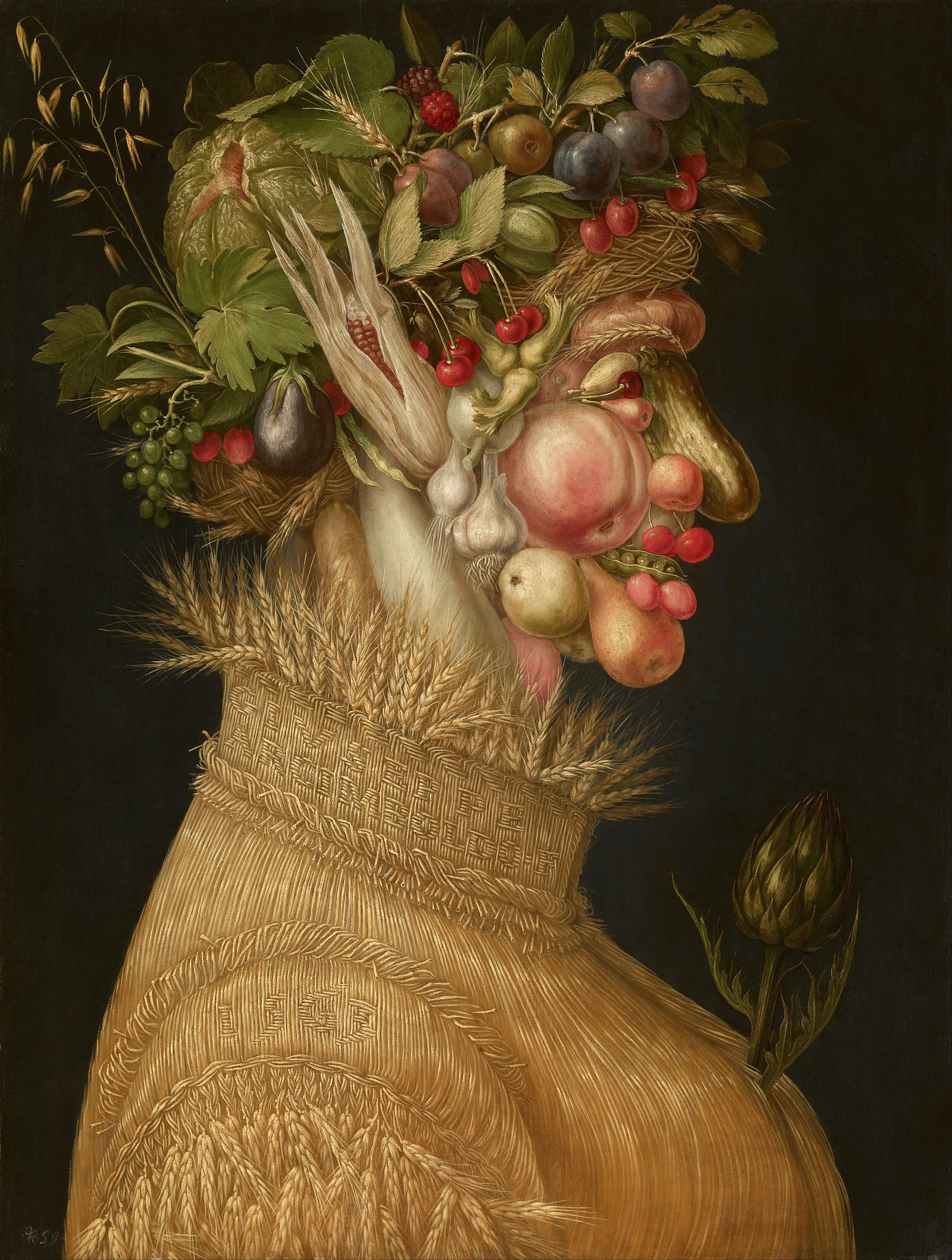
Giuseppe Arcimboldo, Summer, 1563.

=== Giuseppe Arcimboldo, The Four Seasons (1563–1573) ===
During the Renaissance period, Italian painter Giuseppe Arcimboldo painted several human portraits where facial features of individuals were composed of fruits, vegetables and flowers with the intention of creating humorous amusement and symbolic curiosity. The Four Seasons, a set of four portrait paintings produced between 1563 and 1573 for Maximillian II, Holy Roman Emperor represented the different seasons through arrangements of fruit, vegetables, plants and flowers. Each painting included fruits and vegetables appropriate of the time of year and that particular season. Designed to distort and play on the viewer's mind with illusion, his work questions people's perceptions and existing concepts, as they must construct the puzzle-like image themselves.

=== Pieter Aertsen, Market Scenes (1569) ===
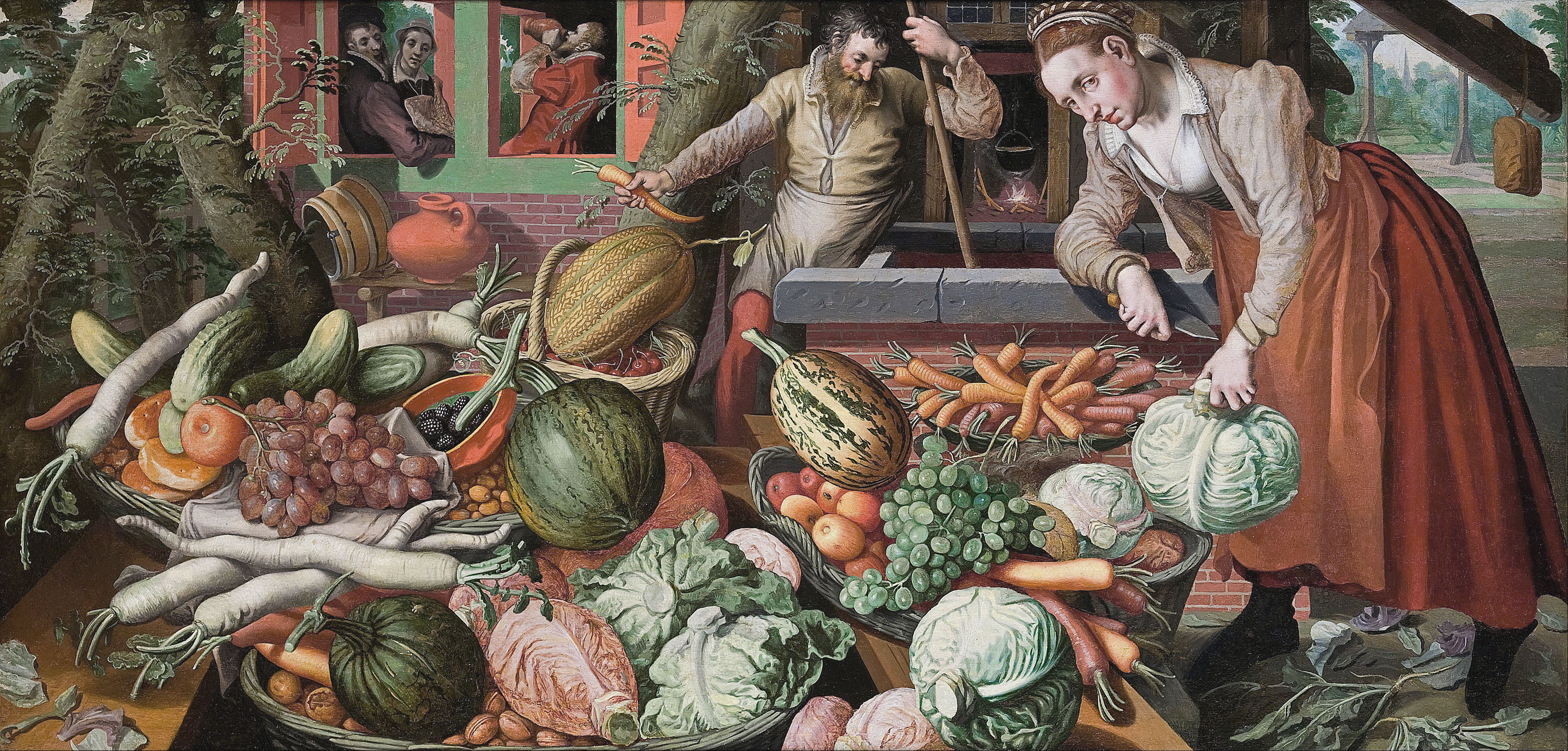
Pieter Aertsen, Market Scene, 1569

While Leonardo da Vinci's work of The Last Supper focused on religion and Anne Vallayer-Coster's on wealth and abundance, other artists, like Pieter Aertsen took a more promiscuous stance in the portrayal of food in his artistic works. Food was used, in many ways, to divert attention to the object in order to overtly symbolise eroticism. For instance, in 1569, Aertsen created a piece of a market scene depicting such subject matters titled Market Woman in Berlin. It showed a woman bending forward holding a cabbage in one hand and a knife in the other while catching the gaze of the (male) observer.

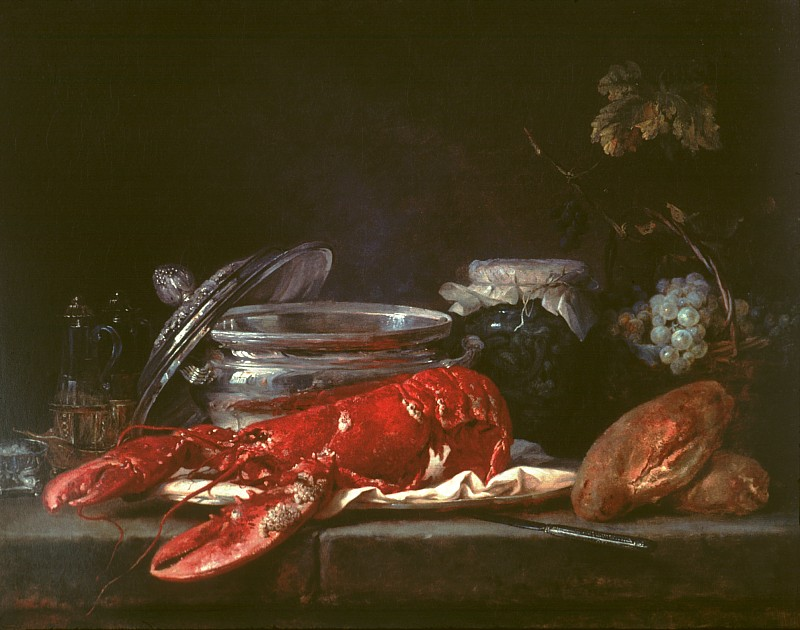
Anne Vallayer-Coster, Still Life with Lobster (1817).

=== Anne Vallayer-Coster, Still Life with Lobster (1817) ===
Food also played a strong figurative role in still life, artistic creations. Particularly, what food items were displayed told a story by reflecting on societal culture and signified an individual's wealth and status, such as lobster, citrus fruits and cured meats. Like Dutch painters Pieter Claesz and Jan Davidsz. de Heem, Anne Vallayer-Coster took inspiration in using texture to showcase such opulence with her last painting Still Life with Lobster (1817). Exhibited at the Salon and donated to King Louis XVIII, her work featured an elaborate arrangement of lobster at the foreground surrounded by mounds of fruit, vegetables, meats and a silver vessel. Coined as "a summation of her work", her specific brushstroke technique and use of vivid colours to create a luminous feature on the lobster shell seeks to appeal to the luxurious consumption of food and lifestyle of the French and Dutch elite.

=== Dieter Roth ===
The Swiss-German artist Dieter Roth is renowned for using food as a medium, especially chocolate. Connected with the traditional Swiss culture, the use of chocolate identifies the national obsession and pleasure with the sweet-treat. In the mid-1960s, he created a series of works where various different objects were submerged into chocolate cylinders, which included Untitled (Doll) in 1969. Other pieces used motorcycles, toy airplanes and souvenirs.

In 1970, the Swiss-German artist Dieter Roth began to use food as a material. He created a piece named Staple Cheese (A Race), a pun for steeplechase, which depicted 37 suitcases filled with cheese displayed on the floor at the Eugenia Butler Museum, in Los Angeles. Over time, the cheese began to rot and attracted swarms of flies and maggots to the viewer's disgust. William Wilson, an art critic, found amusement in the exhibit and the overwhelming stench:

Each case is to be opened of a different day until the closing of the exhibition on May 33. Roth borrowed two days from June and called the gesture a 'Dislocation of Monthmass.'... the staple cheese is a race to see which flavor gets highest, fastest... Anyhow we have a chance to test the idea that art gets better as it gets older. Pure burlesque.

— William Wilson

== See also ==
- Butter sculpture
- Contemporary art
- Culinary arts
- Edible art
- Food photography
- Food porn
- Food presentation
- Gastronomy
- Modern art
- Sugar sculpture
- List of food and drink monuments
