= Food presentation =

Modifying or decorating food for aesthetics

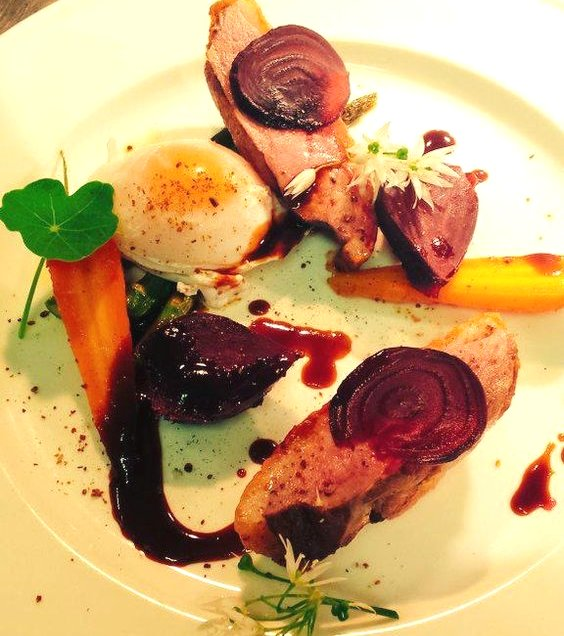
A modern presentation of Irish food: grilled duck breast and venison with a poached egg, carrot, beetroot and wild garlic.

Food presentation is the art of modifying, processing, arranging, or decorating food to enhance its aesthetic appeal.

The visual presentation of foods is often considered by chefs at many different stages of food preparation, from the manner of tying or sewing meats, to the type of cut used in chopping and slicing meats or vegetables, to the style of mold used in a poured dish. The food itself may be decorated as in elaborately iced cakes, topped with ornamental sometimes sculptural consumables, drizzled with sauces, sprinkled with seeds, powders, or other toppings, or it may be accompanied by edible or inedible garnishes.

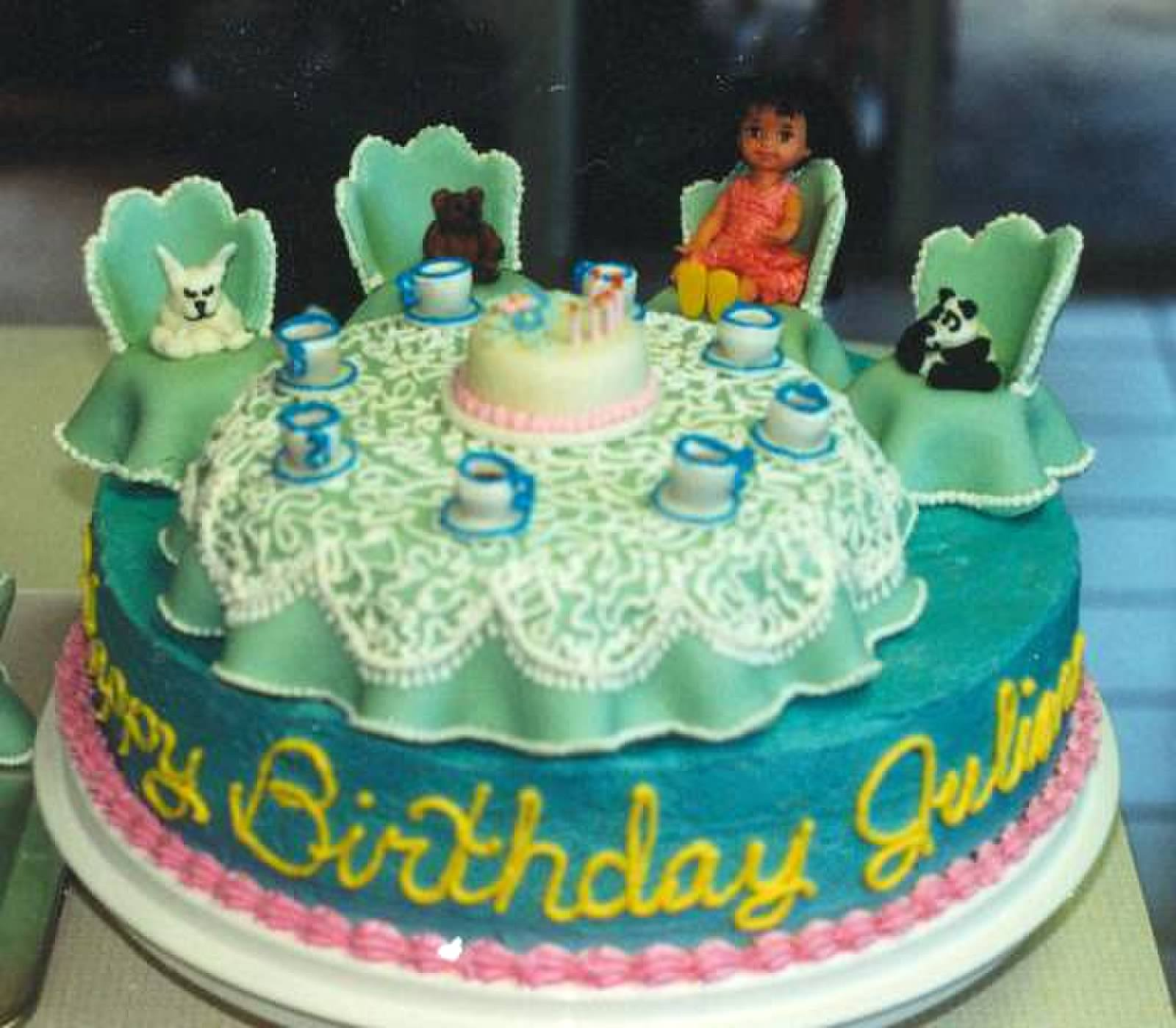
Elaborately decorated tea party birthday cake

Historically, the presentation of food has been used as a show of wealth and power. Such displays often emphasize the complexity of a dish's composition as opposed to its flavors. For instance, ancient sources recall the hosts of Roman banquets adding precious metals and minerals to food in order to enhance its aesthetic appeal. Additionally, medieval aristocrats hosted feasts involving sculptural dishes and shows of live animals. These banquets existed to show the culture and affluence of its host, and were therefore tied to social class. Contemporary food aesthetics reflect the autonomy of the chef, such as in nouvelle cuisine and Japanese bento boxes. Dishes often involve both simplistic and complex designs. Some schools of thought, like French nouvelle cuisine, emphasize minimalism while others create complicated compositions based on modern aesthetic principles.

== Plating ==
The foundation of food presentation is plating. It can include playing with texture, color, and contrast, similar to many other mediums of art. Some common styles of plating include a 'classic' arrangement of the main item in the front of the plate with vegetables or starches in the back, a 'stacked' arrangement of the various items, or the main item leaning or 'shingled' upon a vegetable bed or side item. Restaurants popular for their spectacular food displays and presentations such as Disfrutar feature art techniques seen in more traditional art forms.

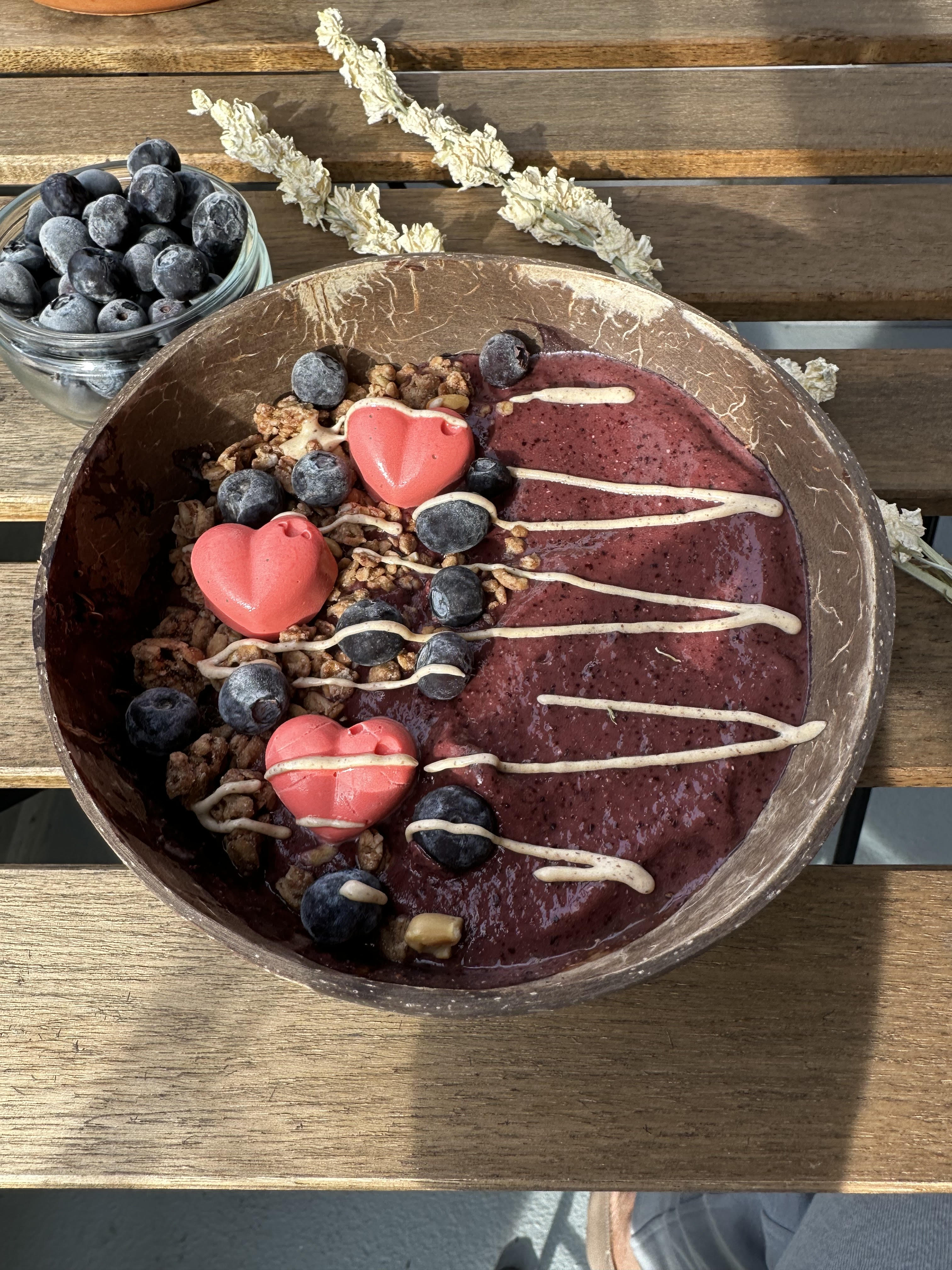
Smoothie bowl

== History ==
=== Ancient Rome ===
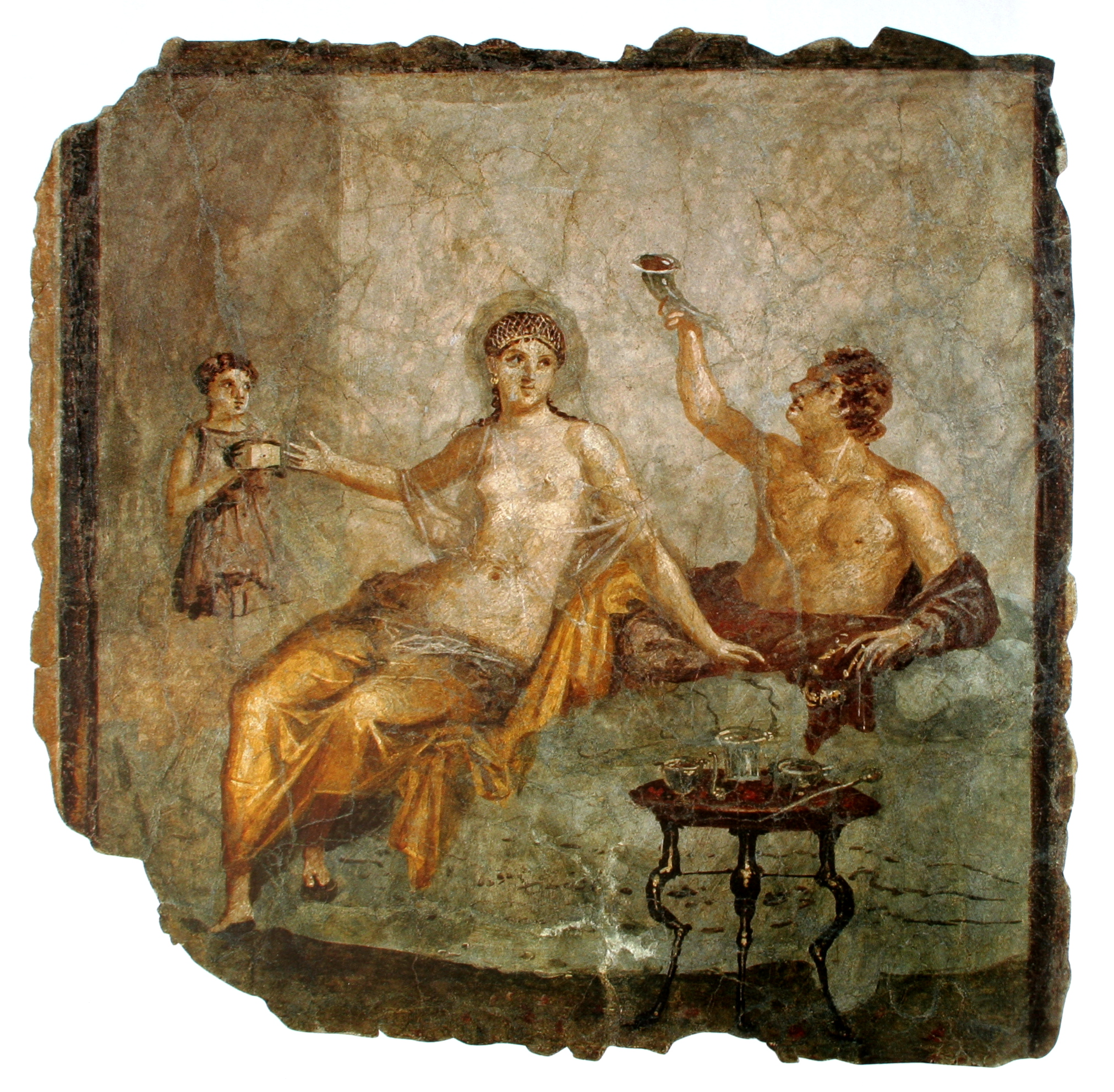
Roman banquet scene from Herculanum, Italy

Banquets were important social events, usually hosted in private residences for friends and clients. The Romans placed great focus on the appearance of their dining room (triclinium), decorating it with murals and mosaics, as well as lavish sculptures and furniture. The overall purpose of a private banquet was entertainment, not only through live performances, but also through the presentation of the food itself. The meal consisted of three courses- appetizers, main course, and dessert- brought out in elaborate rituals. For instance, the main course was sometimes served to the tune of trumpets at particularly luxurious events. Foods that were particularly valued were wild game, such as pheasant and boar, certain kinds of fish, and wild berries, mainly because of their exoticism and high price. Some ancient writers recount Emperor Claudius adding crushed pearls to wine and flecks of gold to peas solely to increase their cost. Others recall live animals being served as shows of entertainment and richness. For instance, at one event mackerels were pickled live in order to showcase their silvery bodies thrashing in vinegar.

=== Medieval Europe ===
Medieval aristocrats also desired to entertain and impress through food. Banquets were usually huge feasts with diverse choices of dishes. Social etiquette dictated that the wealthy and powerful be given beautiful and elaborate dishes while the poor be given simple food, usually scraps. Such banquets not only entertained guests, but also showed the wealth of the host. In particular, the patron sometimes commissioned artists to create complicated sculptures made from food items to awe and inspire. Particular favorites were pies or cakes designed to expel live birds when cut open and multicolored jellies stacked together, dyed with spices and vegetable matter.

== Contemporary ==
In the same way, contemporary food reflects both personal and societal aesthetic beliefs. While cuisine in the past was intrinsically related to wealth and social status, contemporary cuisine is much less distinguished by class. The disintegration of highbrow and lowbrow foods has led to increased accessibility of various foods. Now, it is possible to find a hamburger at a five-star restaurant and exotic cuisines on street corners. Therefore, contemporary food presentation is determined much more by modern aesthetics and creativity than displays of wealth and power.

=== France ===
Nouvelle cuisine is a school of French cooking that rejects ostentatious displays of food in favor of simple presentation and high-quality ingredients. In contrast to historical chefs that obeyed the orders of patrons, this manner of cooking elevates the chef from a skilled worker to an inventor and artist. The aesthetic of nouvelle cuisine emphasizes minimalism, serving fewer courses and utilizing simple plating. Chefs were extremely creative in constructing innovative recipes and plating.

=== Japan ===
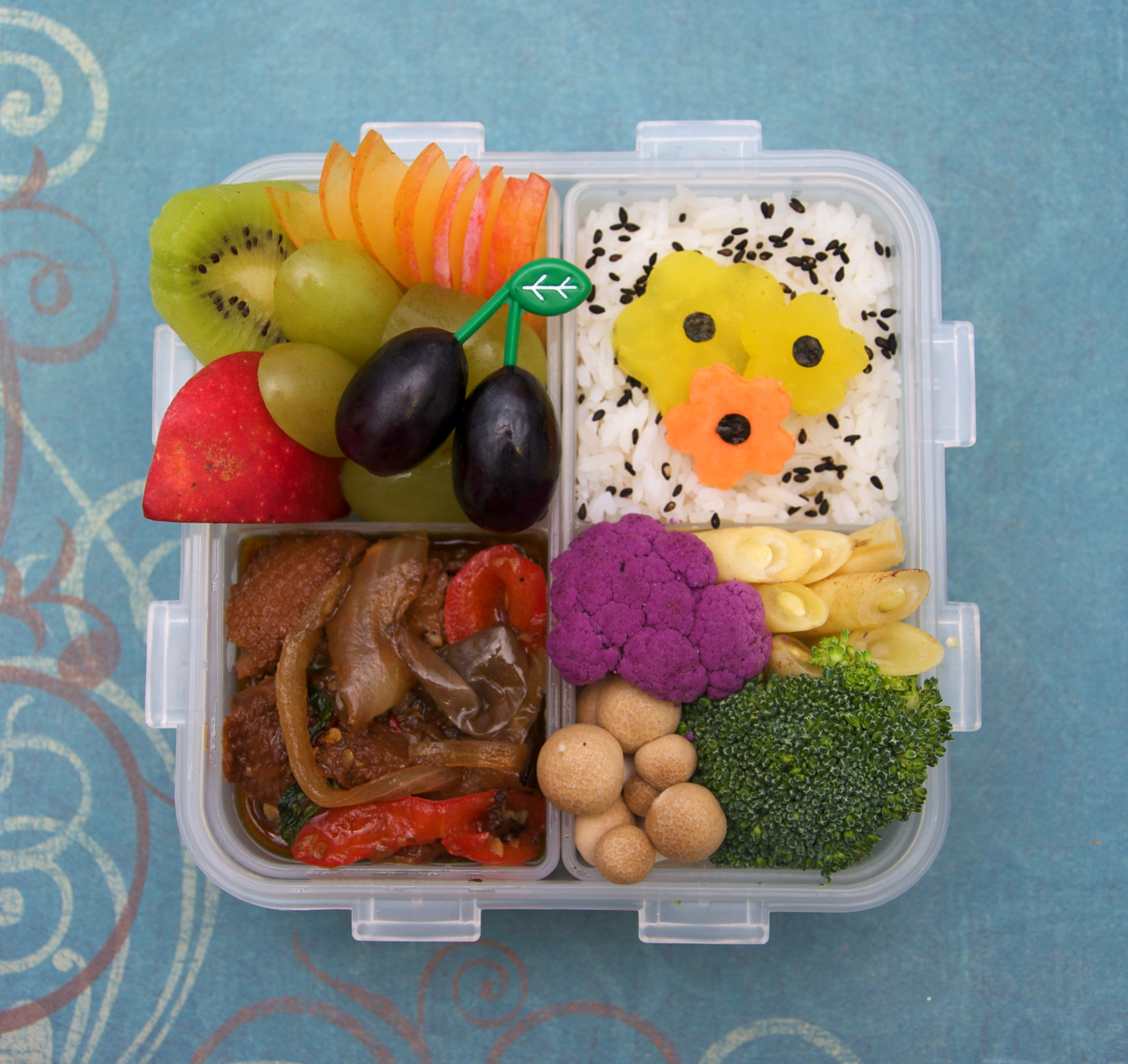
Example of a bento box

==== Bento box ====
A Bento box is a Japanese meal traditionally consisting of rice, meat or fish, and vegetables served in a portable box. In Japan, as well as in the United States, a large focus is placed on the aesthetic arrangement of the food including contests for the most inventive way of creating bento boxes, allowing for creativity in amateur chefs and everyday people. Sometimes bento boxes are used to make sculptural designs, such as rice shaped to look like animals. These specific types of bento boxes are known as Kyaraben or charaben, (キャラ弁) a shortened form of character bento. (キャラクター弁当 kyarakutā bentō) Kyaraben are most often made by mothers to encourage their children to eat more nutritious diets and as a way of showing their love and dedication.

==== Kaiseki ====
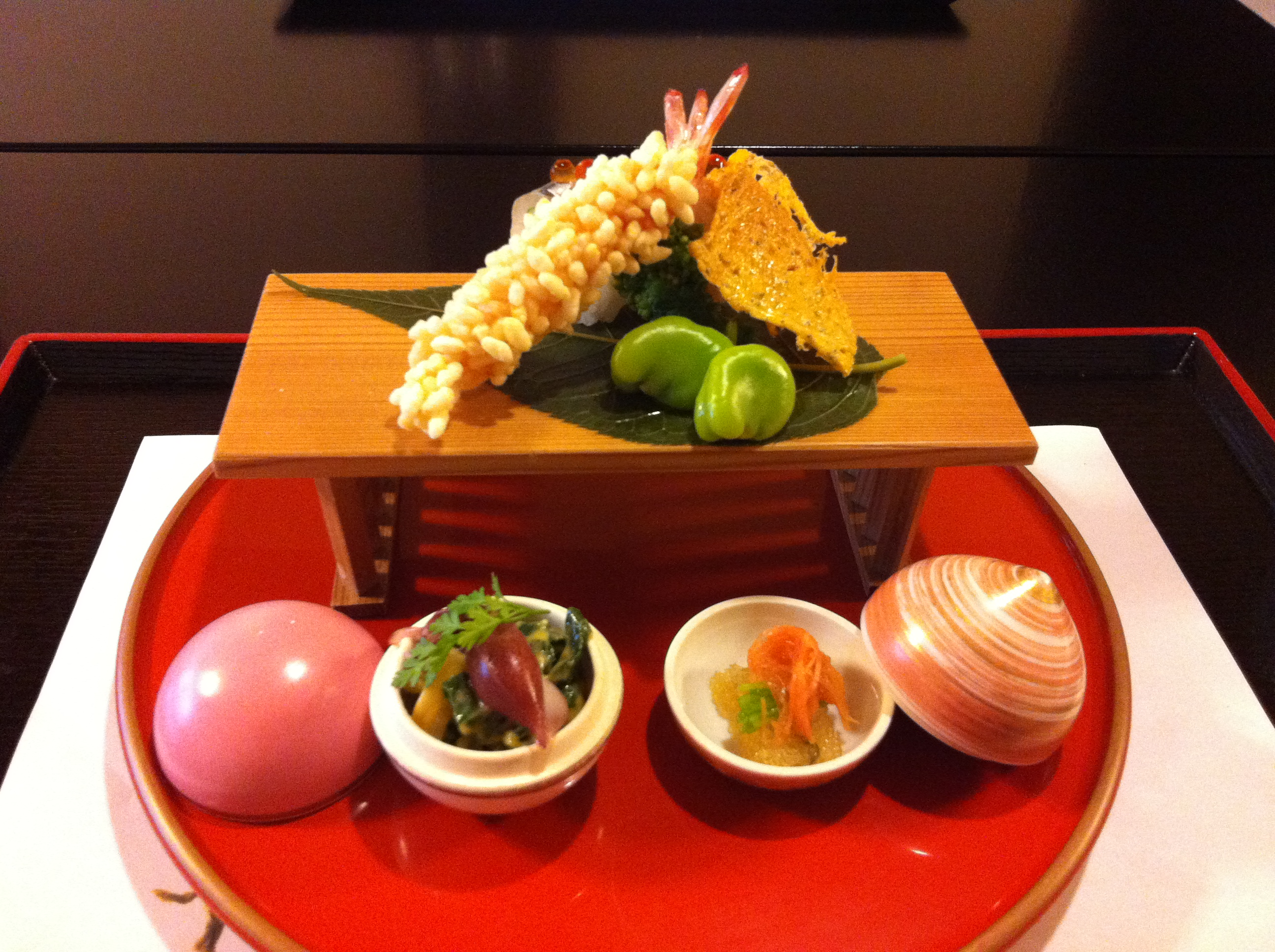
Kaiseki cuisine in Kyoto, Japan

Kaiseki (懐石) is a Japanese multi-course haute cuisine dinner consisting of 7–14 courses, often served at ryokan, but also in small restaurants known as ryōtei, particularly in Kyoto. A large focus of kaiseki is in the elaborate preparation and aesthetic presentation of these meals to enhance the natural flavors of fresh, local ingredients. Meals are often garnished with edible leaves and flowers to enhance the seasonality of the meal and its ingredients and are arranged to resemble natural plants and animals.

Kaiseki dinners most commonly involve an appetizer, sashimi, a simmered dish, a grilled dish, and a steamed dish. Other dishes may be added or omitted depending on the chef.

- Sakizuke (先附): An appetizer.
- Hassun (八寸): A course of sushi and several small side-dishes.
- Mukōzuke (向付): A dish of sliced, seasonal sashimi.
- Takiawase (煮合): A dish of simmered vegetables served with meat, fish or tofu.
- Futamono (蓋物): A "lidded dish"; typically a soup.
- Yakimono (焼物): A flame-broiled dish, typically fish.
- Su-zakana (酢肴): A small dish of vegetables in vinegar, typically used for cleansing the palate.
- Hiyashi-bachi (冷し鉢): Chilled, lightly cooked vegetables. (Available only in the summer months.)
- Naka-choko (中猪口): A light, acidic soup for cleansing the palate.
- Shiizakana (強肴): A substantial dish, such as a hot pot.
- Gohan (御飯): A rice dish made with seasonal ingredients.
- Kō no mono (香の物): Seasonal pickled vegetables.
- Tome-wan (止椀): A miso-based or vegetable soup served with rice.
- Mizumono (水物): A seasonal dessert.

=== Science ===
Modern science can illuminate how and why people respond in certain ways to food plating and presentation. According to a sociological study, people react differently to various aesthetic principles such as color, composition (including a number of components, placement of components, and use of negative space), design, and the organization of a plate. They found that participants responded best to plates with four different colors, three different components, some empty space, and with a disorganized and casual design. This research is particularly important because understanding how food presentation affects how people eat can be used in the study of health and nutrition. For instance, another study showed that participants who ate off of uncleaned tables (i.e. all uneaten food was left on the table) ate less than those who had their tables periodically cleaned. This is presumably because those who could see the leftovers of what they had eaten were less likely to take more food. This could be useful, for instance, in combating the obesity endemic. Another example of science in food aesthetics is the development of molecular food in Spain, which emphasizes the essence of food using scientific elements. Molecular science can break down the roles of carbohydrates and proteins in order to isolate what creates particular tastes. For instance, modern science makes it possible to freeze ice cream using liquid nitrogen and create wine using sugars, creating efficient and visually interesting new dishes.

=== Trends and fads ===
Like other aspects of culture, food presentation is subject to trends and fads. For instance, "unicorn food", a style of presentation that uses a rainbow color palette to decorate food, became popular in 2017. The pastel-like hues are supposed to represent the colors of the mythical unicorn.

== See also ==
- Cake decorating
- Food preparation
- Nouvelle cuisine
- Garde manger
- Entrée
- Dish
- Food photography
- Food porn
- List of food and drink monuments

== Gallery ==
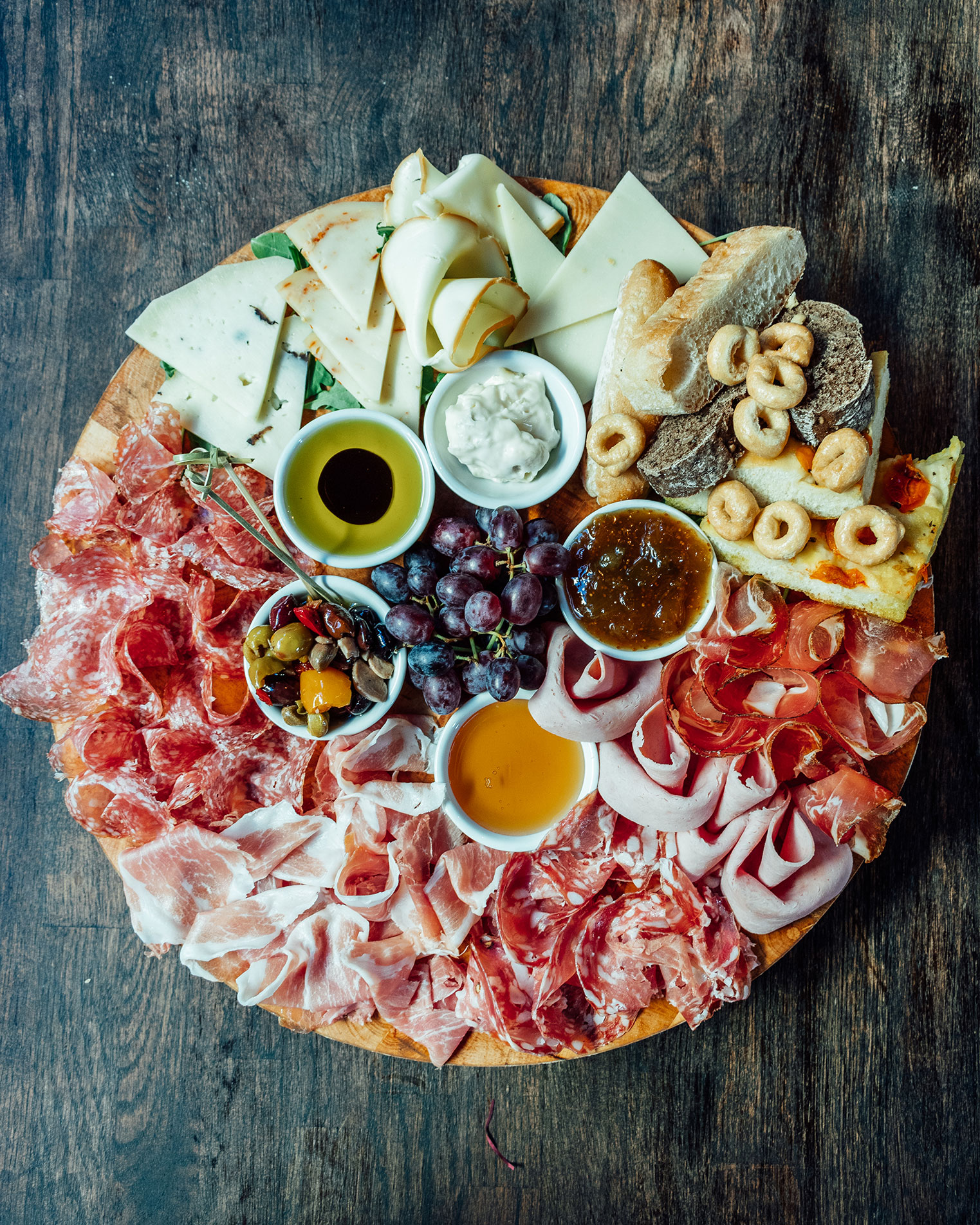
Italian circle setting with cold cuts and cheeses and some nuts and grape and breads with sauce dressing

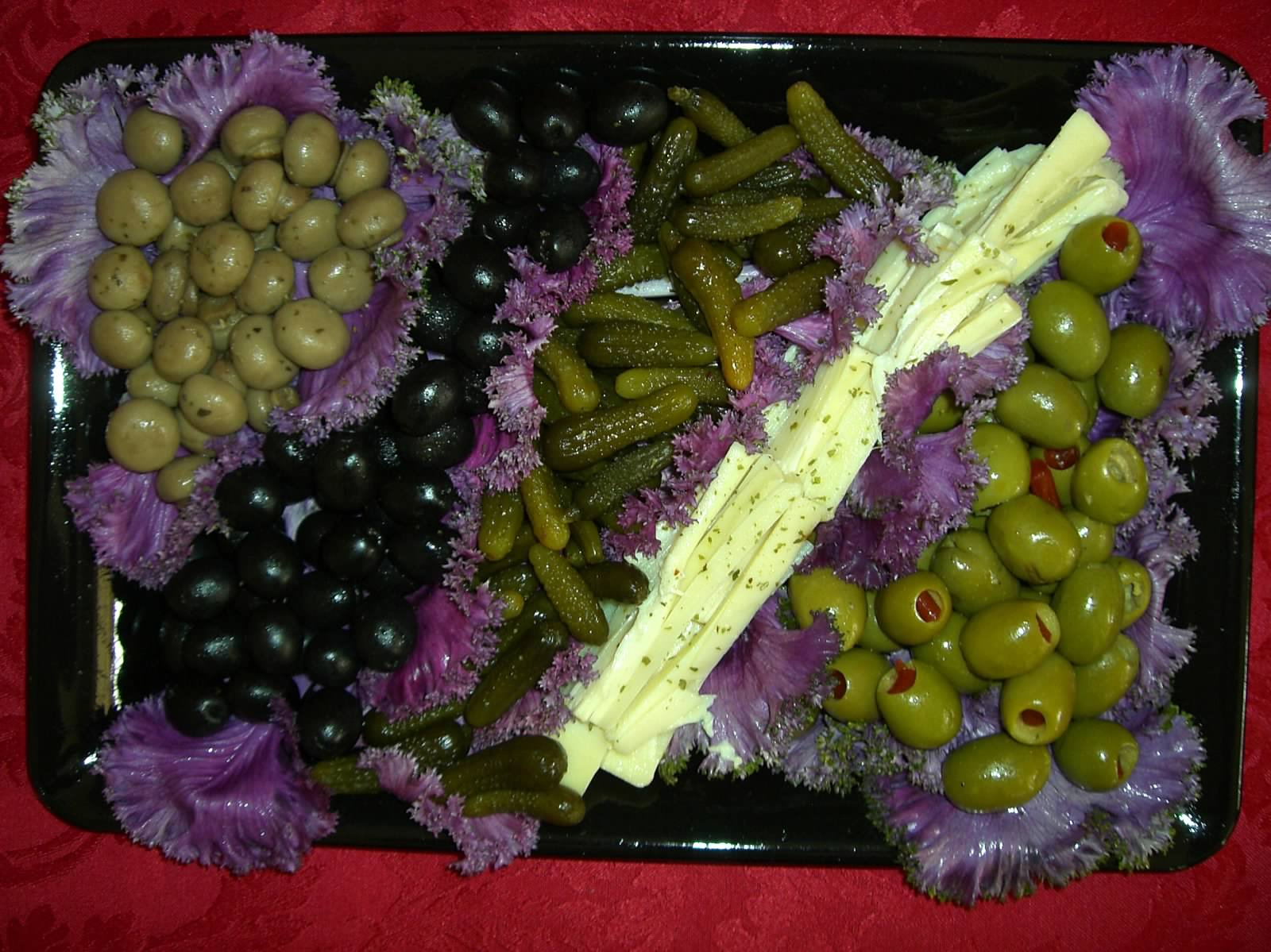
Olives and pickles attractively served on purple cabbage leaves

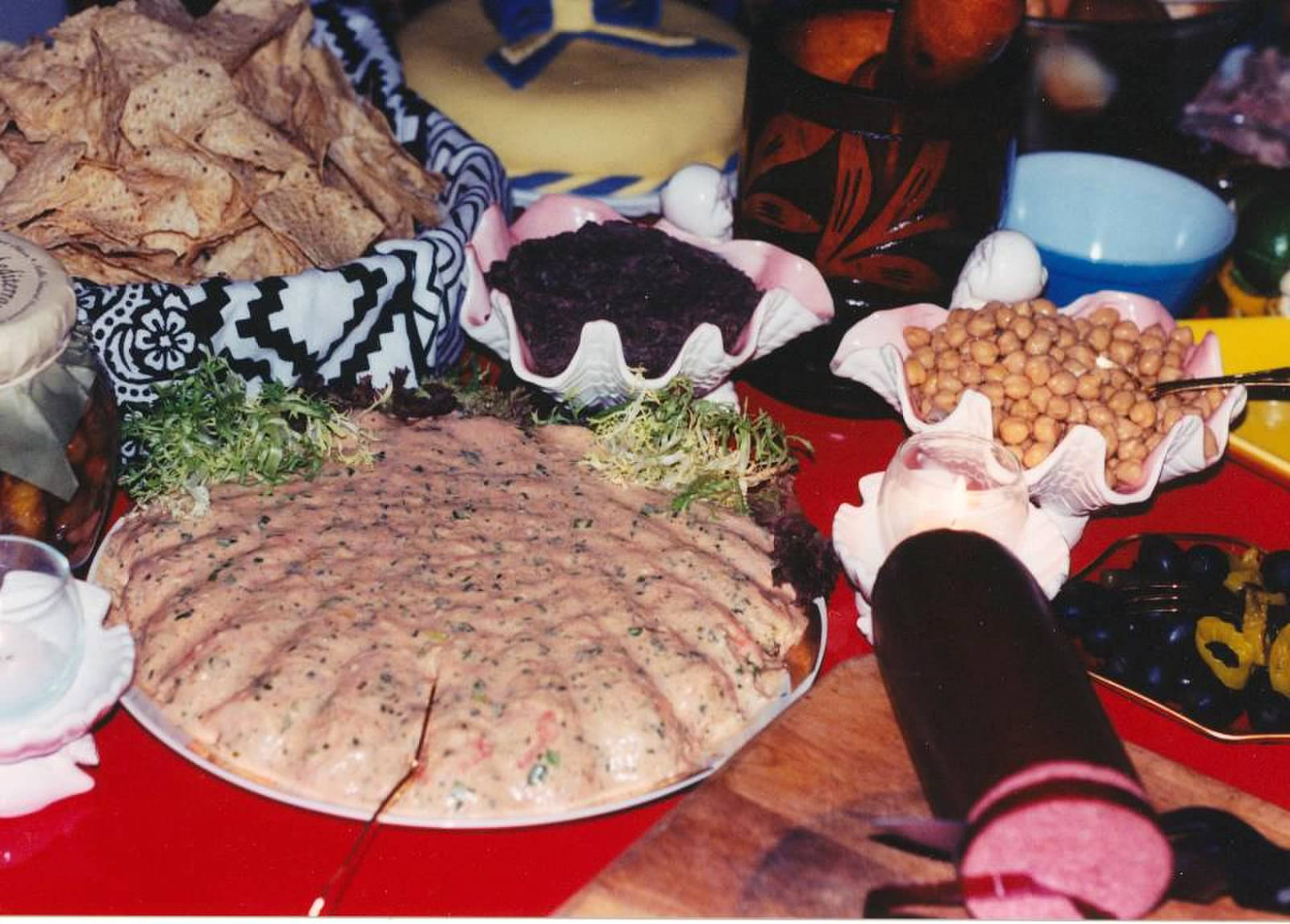
Molded seafood dip garnished with chicory "seaweed" and appetizers served in large sea shells

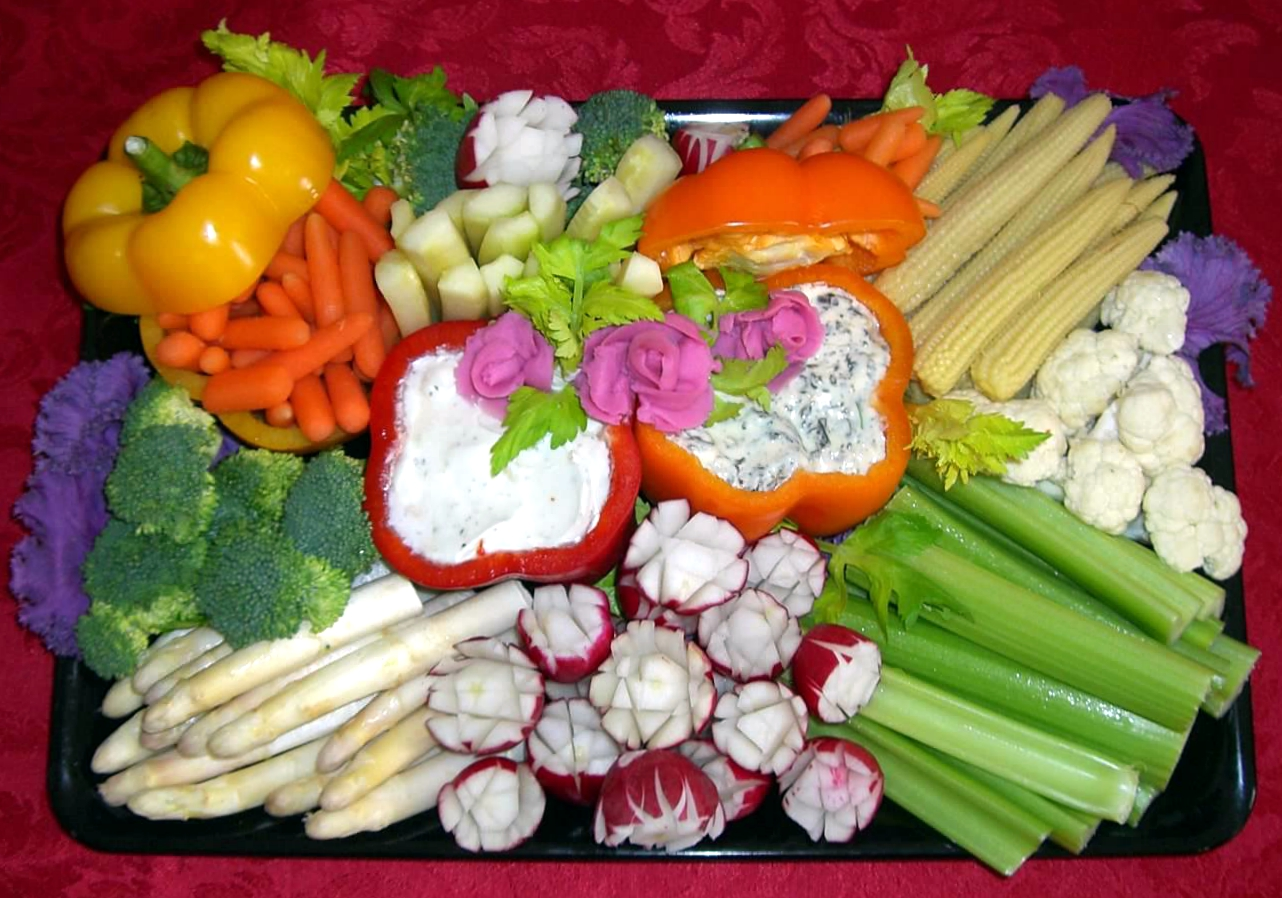
Brightly colored veggie platter arranged over purple cabbage with "rosebud radishes" and sweet peppers used as serving containers

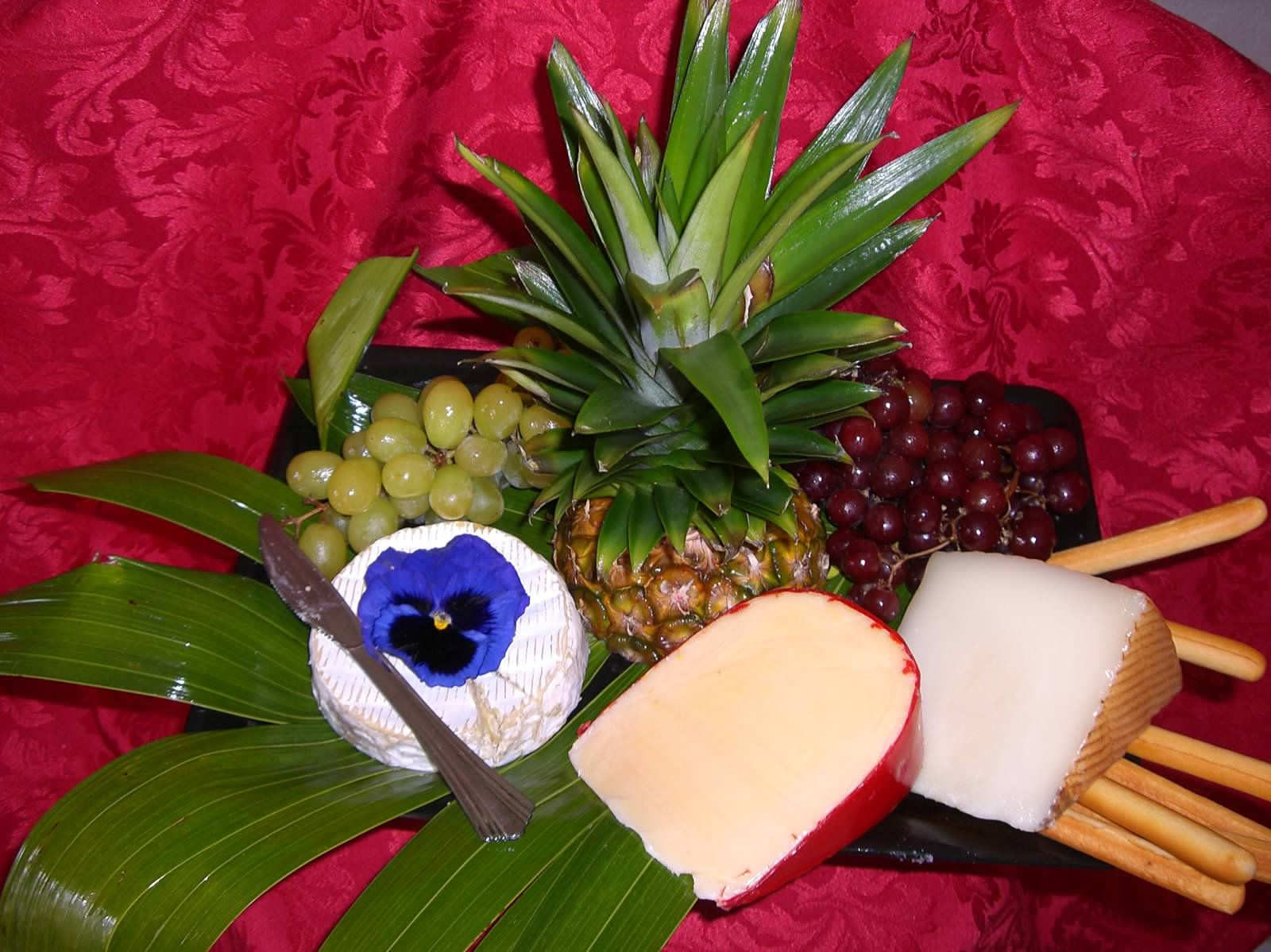
An artful arrangement of cheese, fruit and bread

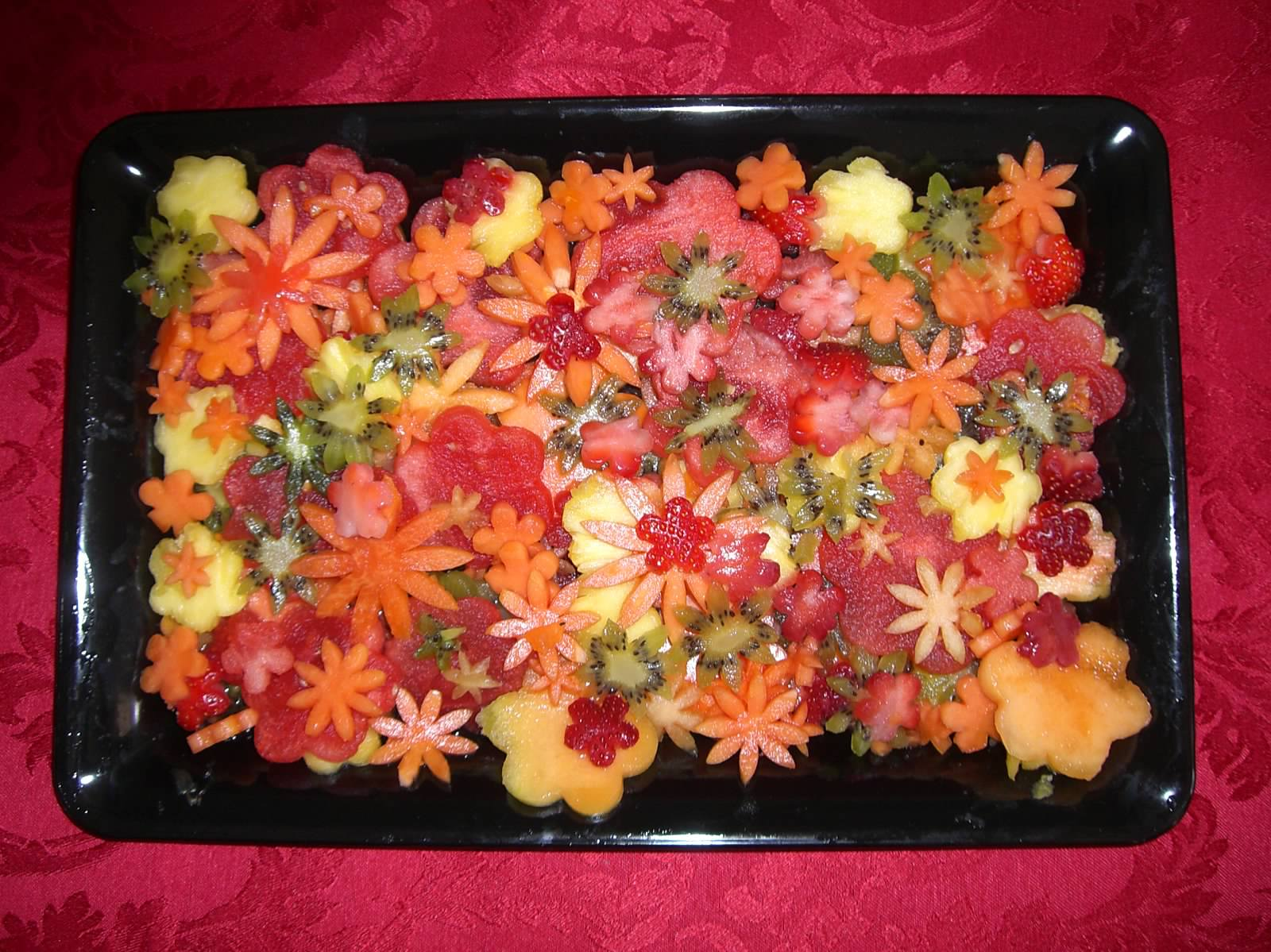
Fruit and vegetable "flowers"

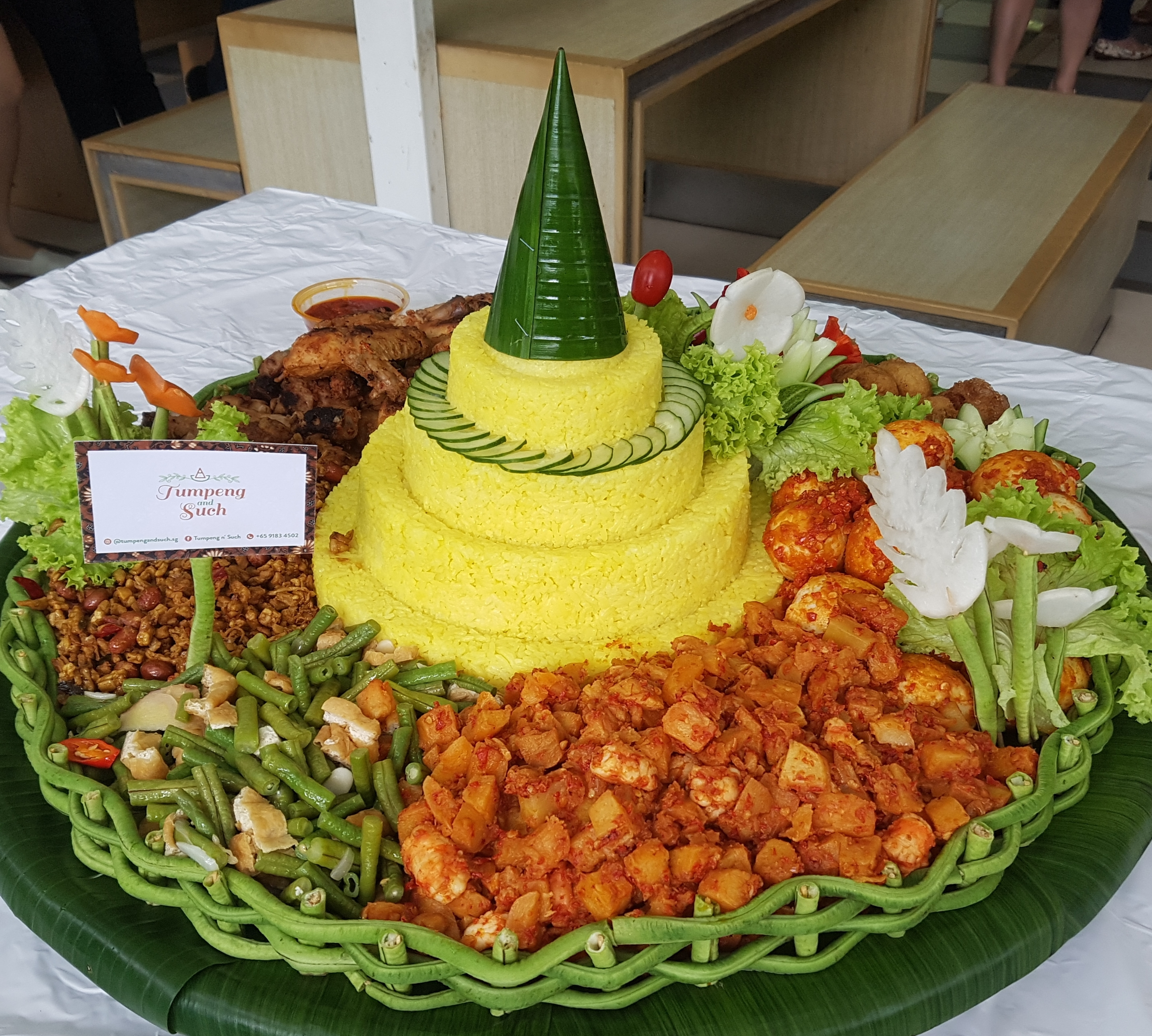
A traditional Javanese tumpeng rice cone, symbolizing "mountain", Indonesia
