= Kherson watermelon =

Symbol of Kherson Oblast, Ukraine

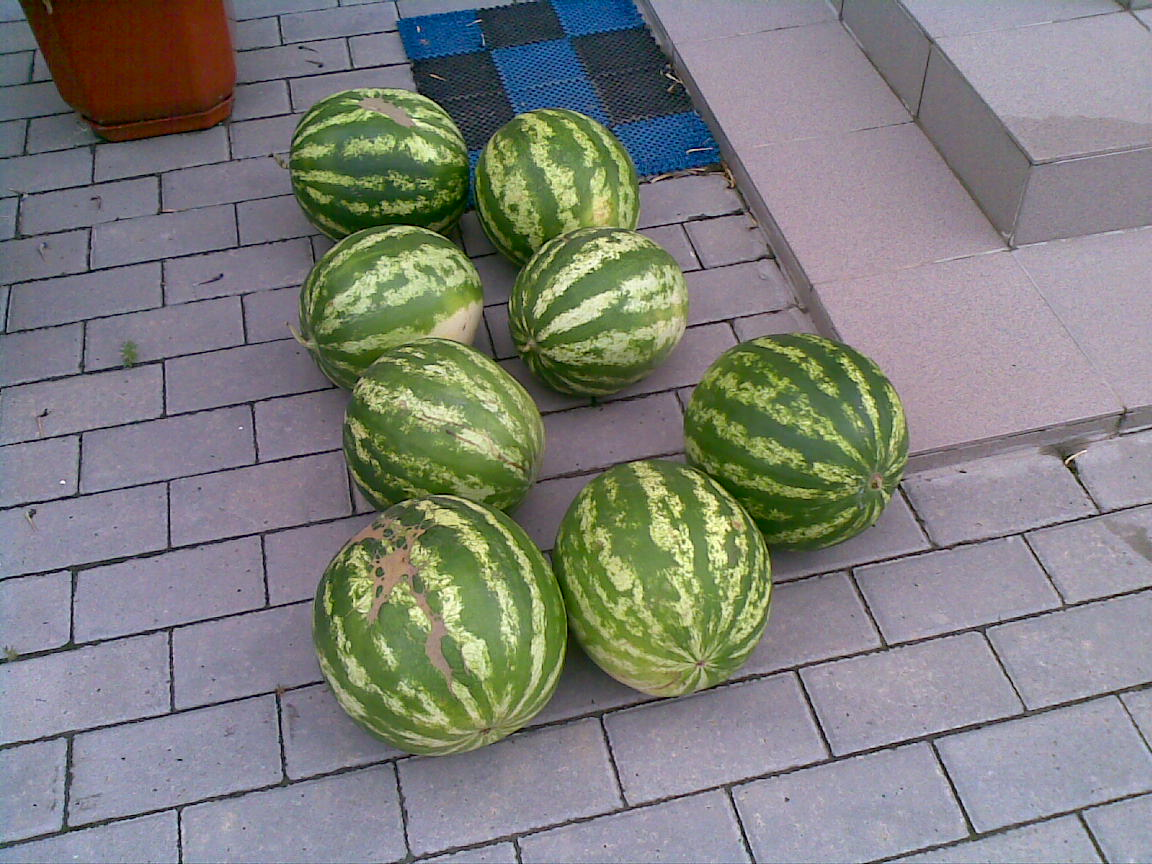
Kherson watermelons

The watermelon is a symbol of the region of Kherson Oblast, Ukraine. More than 50% of the watermelons in Ukraine are produced in Kherson Oblast and are shipped upriver to Kyiv.

== Production ==
Since 24 July 2024, the Kherson watermelon has an appellation of origin in Ukraine, meaning that all stages of its production process are guaranteed to take place in its area of origin, which exclusively determines the product's characteristic qualities. Specifically, it is grown on sandy soils of Kakhovka, Kherson, and Skadovsk raions, yielding dense, crunchy, and sweet (at least 12 °Bx) fruits. Kherson watermelons are round or slightly oblong, with an elongation ratio of 1 to 1.2. The nitrate content is limited to 40 mg/kg.

== History ==
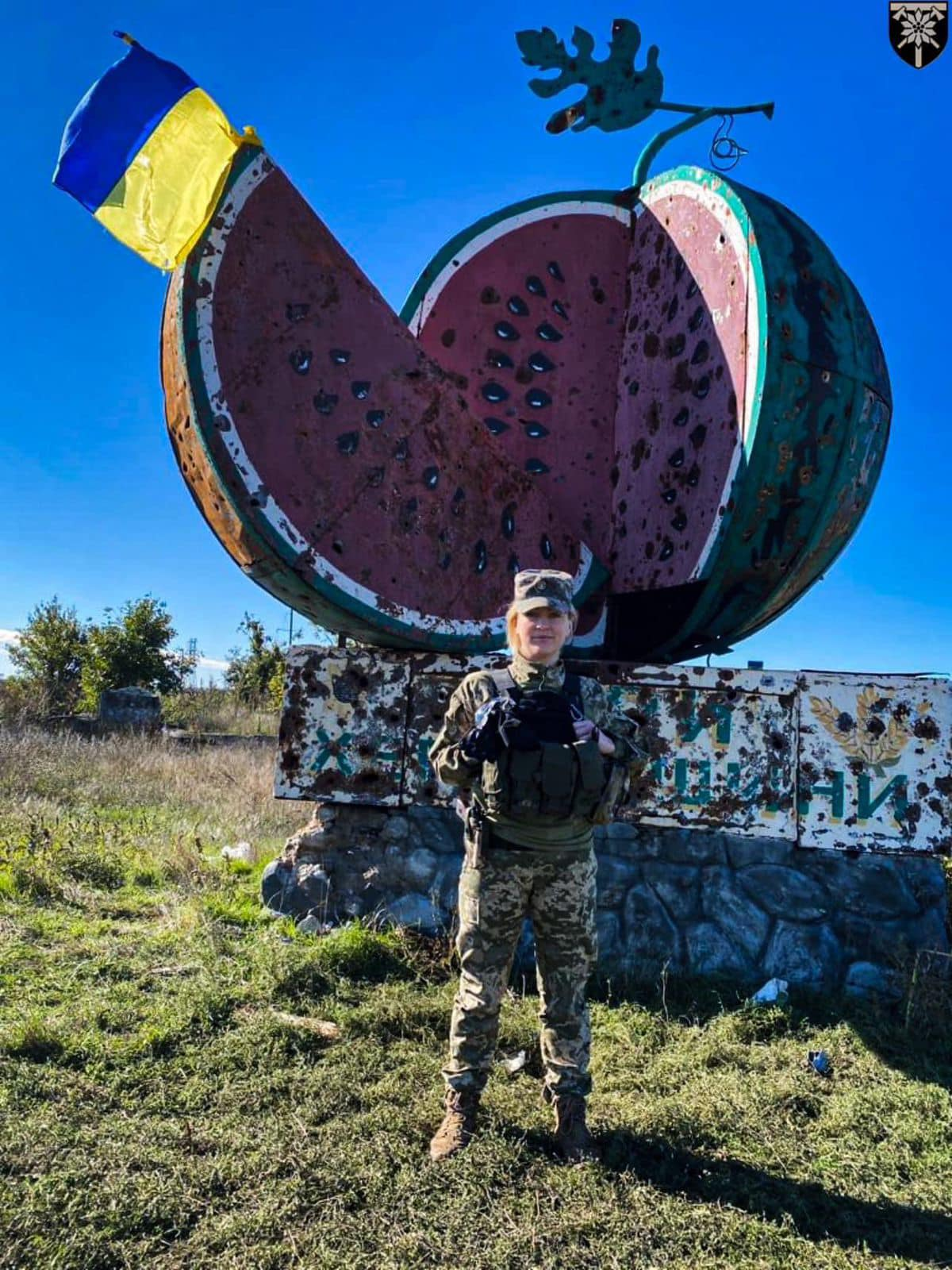
A soldier from the 128th Zakarpattia Mountain Assault Brigade in front of the watermelon monument near Osokorivka in October 2022

Watermelons were thought to have been introduced by Crimean Tatars – a Turkic ethnic group and an indigenous people of Crimea – before the 18th century. During World War II, residents of the Kherson region would make molasses or jam from boiled-down watermelons when there were restrictions on sugar usage. Prior to the Russian invasion of Ukraine, which began in 2022, a yearly tradition was televised, with a barge full of watermelons leaving Kherson for Kyiv along the Dnieper river.

=== Russian invasion ===
During the Russian invasion of Ukraine and the subsequent Russian occupation, farmers in the region who usually produced watermelons were unable to do so. The watermelon became a symbol of Kherson. At the Ukrainian stand at COP27, a watermelon was displayed with a Ukrainian flag. The president of Ukraine, Volodymyr Zelenskyy, joked upon arriving in newly liberated Kherson in November 2022 that he travelled there because he "wanted a watermelon". Ukrposhta, the Ukrainian national postal services company, released watermelon-themed stamps commemorating the liberation of Kherson.

== See also ==
- Watermelon as a Palestinian symbol
- Freedom pineapples
