= Museum of Chocolate (Pokrov) =

Museum in Russia

Coordinates: 55.9179°N 39.1781°E

The Museum of Chocolate, located to the east of Moscow in the town of Pokrov, Vladimir Oblast, was opened on March 12, 2004.

The Museum displays the entire history of chocolate for over 4,000 years. The exhibition tells about the foundation of the Stollwerck factory launched in Pokrov in 1997. In 2001, the factory was acquired by Kraft Foods (USA), one of the largest chocolate producers in Russia, which initiated the foundation of the museum.

In 2003, the Museum of Chocolate won the contest arranged by the Physical Culture, Sports, and Tourism Committee of the Vladimir Region's Government among the newly created museums and exhibitions for tourists. The Museum's visitors can stop by a Shokoladnitsa café for a cup of tea or coffee, and to try products of the local chocolate factory.

The Monument to Chocolate in Pokrov, near the museum, was designed as a result of a design competition, much like that of the Vietnam War Memorial in Washington, DC, in the United States. The winner was Ilya Shanin, a Russian sculptor whose art reaches Germany, Austria, and Belgium. The monument itself shows a man with a tall, pointy hat. The man's chest resembles the square pieces of a chocolate bar, and the man carries a chocolate bar.

The exhibition is hosted by the Pokrov Local History Museum.
