= Food =

Substance consumed for nutrition

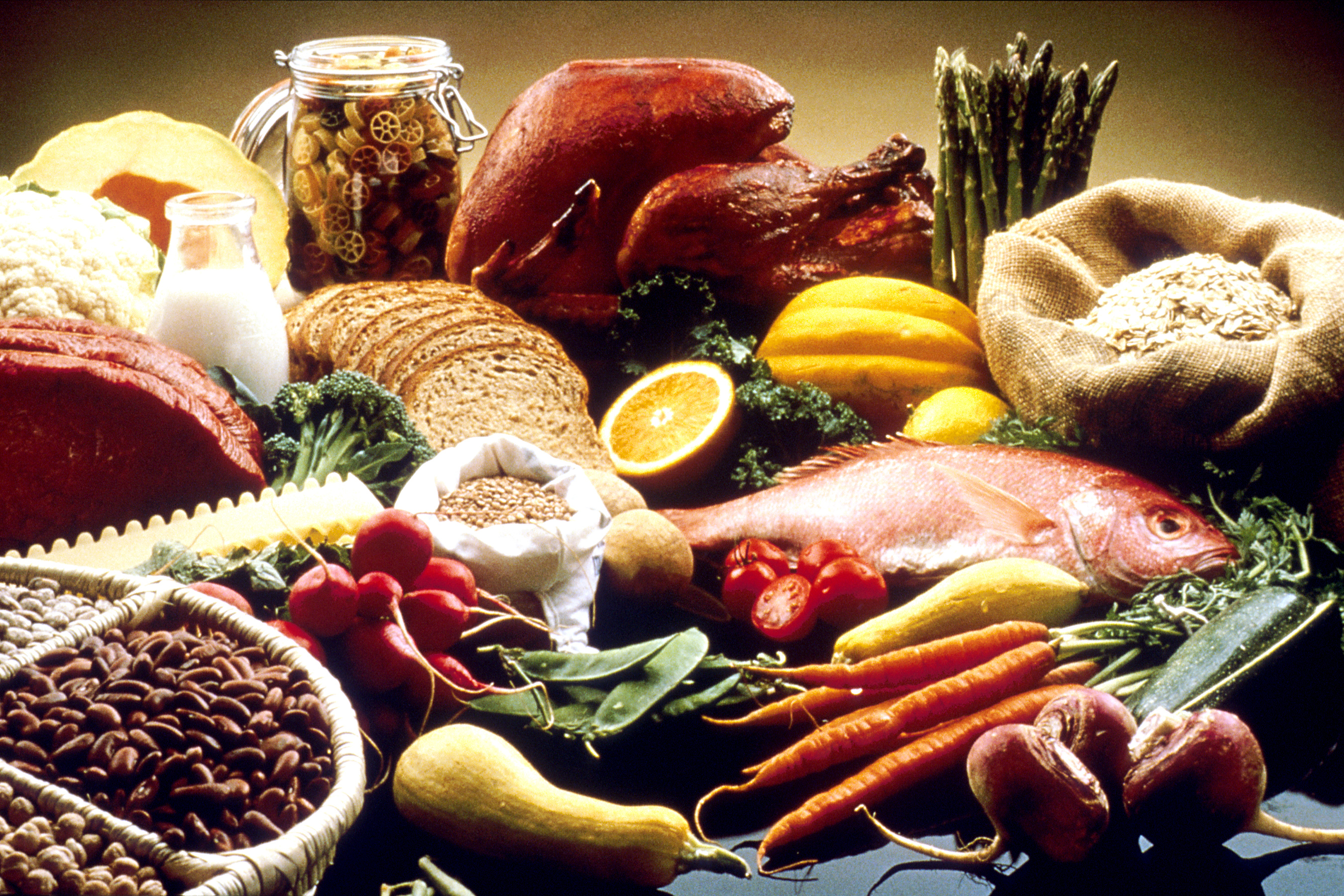
Display of various foods across human cuisines

Food is any substance that is consumed by an organism for nutritional support. Food usually consists of plant, animal, or fungal origin and contains essential nutrients such as carbohydrates, fats, proteins, vitamins, or minerals. The substance is ingested by an organism and assimilated by the organism's cells to provide energy, maintain life, encourage physical requirements, and support growth. Different species of animals have different feeding behaviours that satisfy the needs of their metabolisms and have evolved to fill specific ecological niches within specific geographical contexts.

Omnivorous humans are highly adaptable and have adapted to obtaining food in many different ecosystems. Humans generally use cooking to prepare food for consumption. The majority of the food energy required is supplied by the industrial food industry, which produces food through intensive agriculture and distributes it through complex food processing and food distribution systems. This system of conventional agriculture relies heavily on fossil fuels, which means food and agricultural systems are one of the major contributors to climate change, accounting for as much as 37% of total greenhouse gas emissions.

The food system has a significant impact on a wide range of other social and political issues, including sustainability, biological diversity, economics, population growth, water supply, and food security. Food safety and security are monitored by international agencies, like the International Association for Food Protection, the World Resources Institute, the World Food Programme, the Food and Agriculture Organization, and the International Food Information Council.

== Definition and classification ==
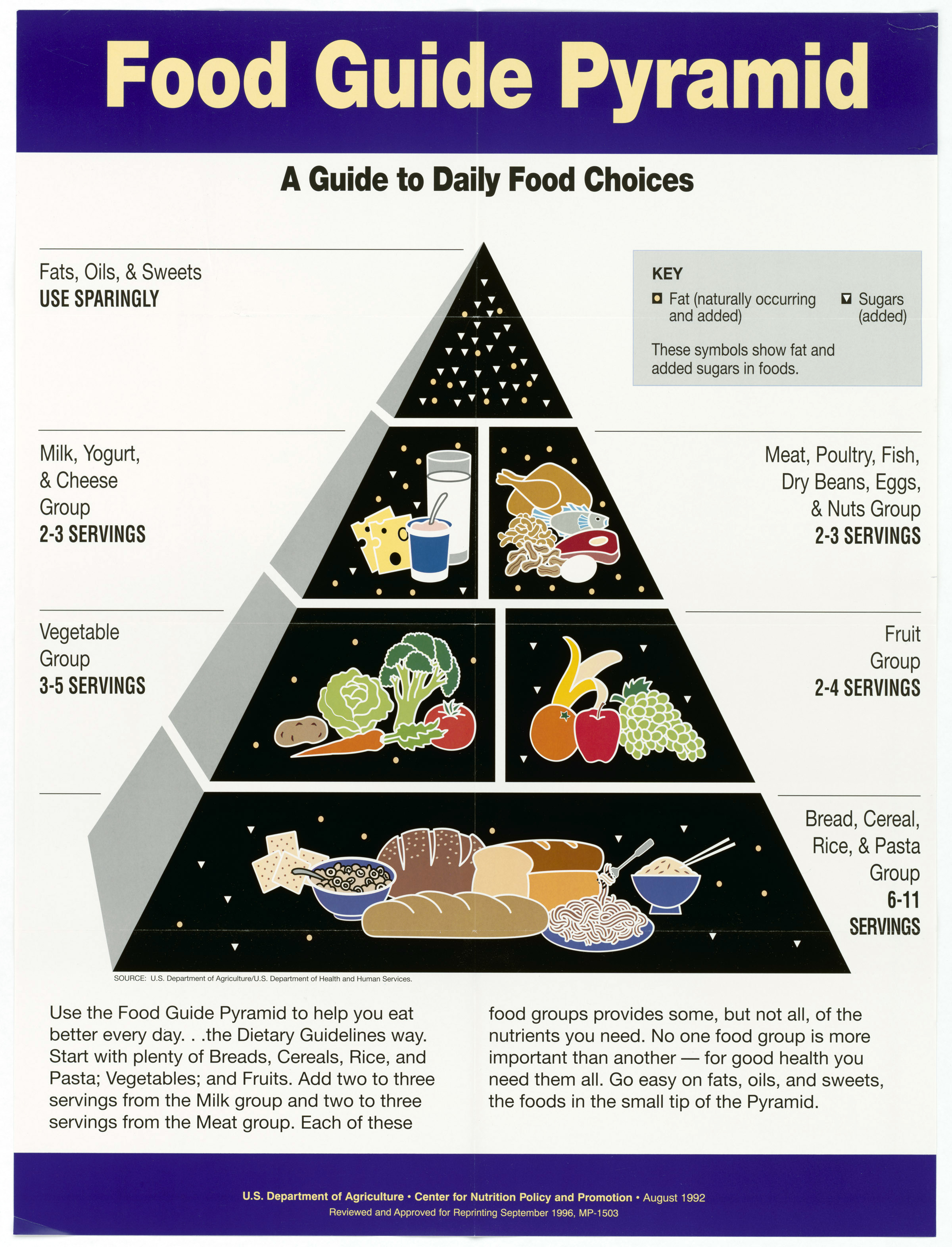
A food guide pyramid infographic

Food is any substance consumed to provide nutritional support and energy to an organism. It can be raw, processed, or formulated and is consumed orally by animals for growth, health, or pleasure. Food is mainly composed of water, lipids, proteins, and carbohydrates. Other organic substances (e.g., vitamins) and minerals (e.g., salts) can also be found in food. Plants, algae, and some microorganisms use photosynthesis to make some of their own nutrients. Water is found in nearly all foods and has been defined as food by itself. Water has no food energy, and fibers have low energy densities, or food energy relative to volume, some providing none, while fat is the most energy-dense component. Some inorganic substances are also essential for plant and animal functioning.

Human food can be classified in various ways, either by related content or by how it is processed. The number and composition of food groups can vary. Most systems include four basic groups described by their origins and relative nutritional functions: vegetables and fruit, cereals and bread, dairy, and meat. Studies that look into diet quality group food into whole grains, refined grains, vegetables, fruits, nuts, legumes, eggs, dairy products, fish, red meat, processed meat, and sugar-sweetened beverages. The Food and Agriculture Organization and World Health Organization use a system with eighteen or nineteen (Note: The source claims nineteen but lists eighteen, numbered 1–15 and 17–19.) food classifications, including: cereals and their products; roots, tubers, plantains and their products; pulses, seeds and nuts and their products; milk and milk products; eggs and their products; fish, shellfish and their products; meat and meat products; insects, grubs and their products; vegetables and their products; fruits and their products; fats and oils; sweets and sugars; spices and condiments; beverages; foods for particular nutritional uses; food additives; composite dishes; and savory snacks.

== Food sources ==
A typical aquatic food web

In a given ecosystem, food forms a web of interlocking chains with primary producers at the bottom and apex predators at the top. Other aspects of the web include detritivores (that eat detritis) and decomposers (that break down dead organisms). Primary producers include algae, plants, bacteria and protists that acquire their energy from sunlight. Primary consumers are the herbivores that consume the plants, and secondary consumers are the carnivores that consume those herbivores. Some organisms, including most mammals and birds, have diets consisting of both animals and plants, and are considered omnivores. The chain ends with the apex predators, the animals that have no known predators in its ecosystem. Humans are considered apex predators.

Humans are omnivores, finding sustenance in vegetables, fruits, cooked meat, milk, eggs, mushrooms and seaweed. Cereal grain is a staple food that provides more food energy worldwide than any other type of crop. Corn (maize), wheat, and rice account for 87% of all grain production worldwide. Just over half of the world's crops are used to feed humans (55 percent), with 36 percent grown as animal feed and 9 percent for biofuels. Fungi and bacteria are also used in the preparation of fermented foods like bread, wine, cheese and yogurt.

=== Photosynthesis ===
During photosynthesis, energy from the sun is absorbed and used to transform water and carbon dioxide in the air or soil into oxygen and glucose. The oxygen is then released, and the glucose stored as an energy reserve. Photosynthetic plants, algae and certain bacteria often represent the lowest point of the food chains, making photosynthesis the primary source of energy and food for nearly all life on earth.

Plants also absorb important nutrients and minerals from the air, natural waters, and soil. Carbon, oxygen and hydrogen are absorbed from the air or water and are the basic nutrients needed for plant survival. The three main nutrients absorbed from the soil for plant growth are nitrogen, phosphorus and potassium, with other important nutrients including calcium, sulfur, magnesium, iron boron, chlorine, manganese, zinc, copper molybdenum and nickel.

=== Microorganisms ===
Bacteria and other microorganisms also form the lower rungs of the food chain. They obtain their energy from photosynthesis or by breaking down dead organisms, waste or chemical compounds. Some form symbiotic relationships with other organisms to obtain their nutrients. Bacteria provide a source of food for protozoa, who in turn provide a source of food for other organisms such as small invertebrates. Other organisms that feed on bacteria include nematodes, fan worms, shellfish and a species of snail.

In the marine environment, plankton (which includes bacteria, archaea, algae, protozoa and microscopic fungi) provide a crucial source of food to many small and large aquatic organisms.

Without bacteria, life would scarcely exist because bacteria convert atmospheric nitrogen into nutritious ammonia. Ammonia is the precursor to proteins, nucleic acids, and most vitamins. Since the advent of the industrial process for nitrogen fixation, the Haber-Bosch Process, the majority of ammonia in the world is human-made.

=== Plants ===
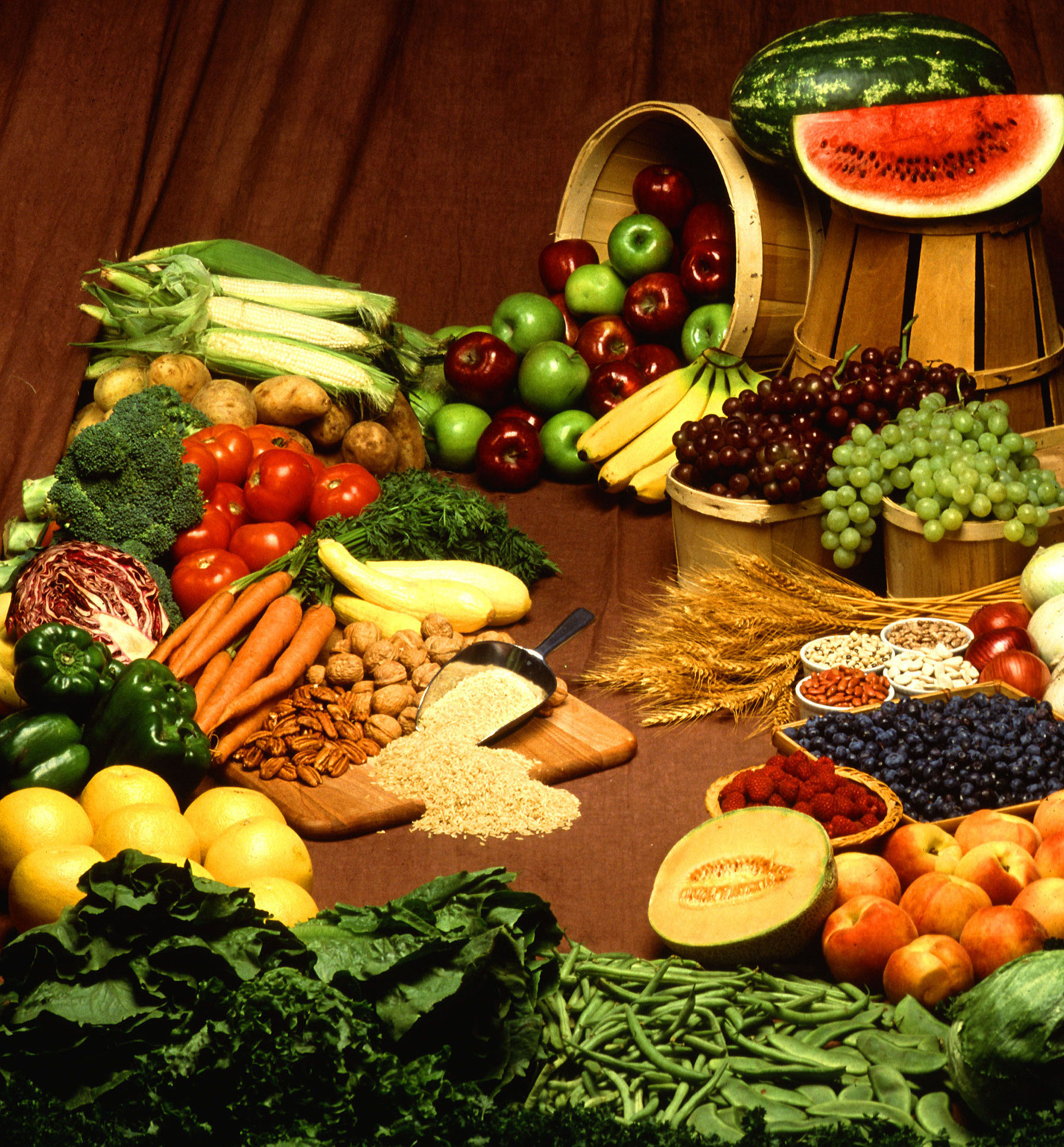
Foods from plant sources

Plants as a food source are divided into seeds, fruits, vegetables, legumes, grains and nuts. Where plants fall within these categories can vary, with botanically described fruits such as the tomato, squash, pepper and eggplant or seeds like peas commonly considered vegetables. Food is a fruit if the part eaten is derived from the reproductive tissue, so seeds, nuts and grains are technically fruit. From a culinary perspective, fruits are generally considered the remains of botanically described fruits after grains, nuts, seeds and fruits used as vegetables are removed. Grains can be defined as seeds that humans eat or harvest, with cereal grains (oats, wheat, rice, corn, barley, rye, sorghum and millet) belonging to the Poaceae (grass) family and pulses coming from the Fabaceae (legume) family. Whole grains are foods that contain all the elements of the original seed (bran, germ, and endosperm). Nuts are dry fruits, distinguishable by their woody shell.

Fleshy fruits (distinguishable from dry fruits like grain, seeds and nuts) can be further classified as stone fruits (cherries and peaches), pome fruits (apples, pears), berries (blackberry, strawberry), citrus (oranges, lemon), melons (watermelon, cantaloupe), Mediterranean fruits (grapes, fig), tropical fruits (banana, pineapple). Vegetables refer to any other part of the plant that can be eaten, including roots, stems, leaves, flowers, bark or the entire plant itself. These include root vegetables (potatoes and carrots), bulbs (onion family), flowers (cauliflower and broccoli), leaf vegetables (spinach and lettuce) and stem vegetables (celery and asparagus).

The carbohydrate, protein and lipid content of plants is highly variable. Carbohydrates are mainly in the form of starch, fructose, glucose and other sugars. Most vitamins are found from plant sources, with the exception of vitamin D and vitamin B_{12}. Minerals can also be plentiful or not. Fruit can consist of up to 90% water, contain high levels of simple sugars that contribute to their sweet taste, and have a high vitamin C content. Compared to fleshy fruit (excepting bananas) vegetables are high in starch, potassium, dietary fiber, folate and vitamins and low in fat and calories. Grains are more starch based and nuts have a high protein, fiber, vitamin E and B content. Seeds are a good source of food for animals because they are abundant and contain fiber and healthful fats, such as omega-3 fats. Complicated chemical interactions can enhance or depress bioavailability of certain nutrients. Phytates can prevent the release of some sugars and vitamins.

Animals that only eat plants are called herbivores, with those that mostly just eat fruits known as frugivores, while leaf and shoot eaters are folivores (pandas) and wood eaters termed xylophages (termites). Frugivores include a diverse range of species from annelids to elephants, chimpanzees and many birds. About 182 fish consume seeds or fruit. Animals (domesticated and wild) use as many types of grasses that have adapted to different locations as their main source of nutrients.

Humans eat thousands of plant species; there may be as many as 75,000 edible species of angiosperms, of which perhaps 7,000 are often eaten. Plants can be processed into breads, pasta, cereals, juices and jams or raw ingredients such as sugar, herbs, spices and oils can be extracted. Oilseeds are pressed to produce rich oils – ⁣sunflower, flaxseed, rapeseed (including canola oil) and sesame.

Many plants and animals have coevolved in such a way that the fruit is a good source of nutrition for the animal, who then excretes the seeds some distance away, allowing greater dispersal. Even seed predation can be mutually beneficial, as some seeds can survive the digestion process. Insects are major eaters of seeds, with ants being the only real seed dispersers. Birds, although being major dispersers, only rarely eat seeds as a source of food and can be identified by their thick beak that is used to crack open the seed coat. Mammals eat a more diverse range of seeds, as they are able to crush harder and larger seeds with their teeth.

=== Animals ===
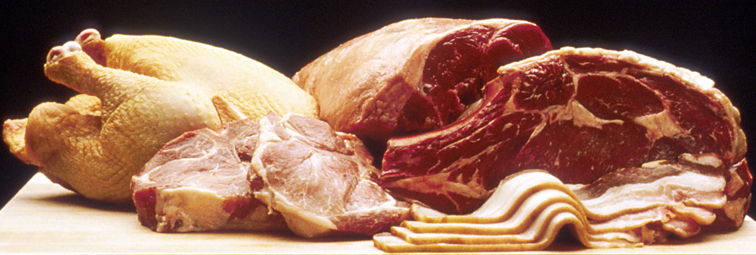
Various raw meats

Animals are used as food either directly or indirectly. This includes meat, eggs, shellfish and dairy products like milk and cheese. They are an important source of protein and are considered complete proteins for human consumption as they contain all the essential amino acids that the human body needs. One 4-ounce (110 g) steak, chicken breast or pork chop contains about 30 grams of protein. One large egg has 7 grams of protein. A 4-ounce (110 g) serving of cheese has about 15 grams of protein. And 1 cup (~240 mL) of milk has about 8 grams of protein. Other nutrients found in animal products include calories, fat, essential vitamins (including B12) and minerals (including zinc, iron, calcium, magnesium).

Food products produced by animals include milk produced by mammary glands, which in many cultures is drunk or processed into dairy products (cheese, butter, etc.). Eggs laid by birds and other animals are eaten and bees produce honey, a reduced nectar from flowers that is used as a popular sweetener in many cultures. Some cultures consume blood, such as in blood sausage, as a thickener for sauces, or in a cured, salted form for times of food scarcity, and others use blood in stews such as jugged hare.

== Taste ==
Animals, specifically humans, typically have five different types of taste sense: sweet, sour, salty, bitter, and umami. The differing tastes are important for distinguishing between foods that are nutritionally beneficial and those which may contain toxins. As animals have evolved, the tastes that provide the most energy are the most pleasant to eat while others are not enjoyable, although humans in particular can acquire a preference for some substances which are initially unenjoyable. Water, while important for survival, has no taste.

Sweetness is almost always caused by a type of simple sugar, such as glucose or fructose, or disaccharides, such as sucrose, a molecule combining glucose and fructose. Sourness is caused by acids, such as vinegar. Sour foods include citrus, especially lemons and limes. Sour is evolutionarily significant as it can signal a food that may have gone rancid due to bacteria. Saltiness is the taste of alkali metal ions such as sodium and potassium. It is found in almost every food in low to moderate proportions and enhances flavor. Bitter taste is a sensation considered unpleasant, caused by foods such as unsweetened dark chocolate, caffeine, lemon rind, and some types of fruit. Umami, commonly described as savory, is a marker of proteins and characteristic of broths and cooked meats. Foods that have a strong umami flavor include cheese, meat and mushrooms.

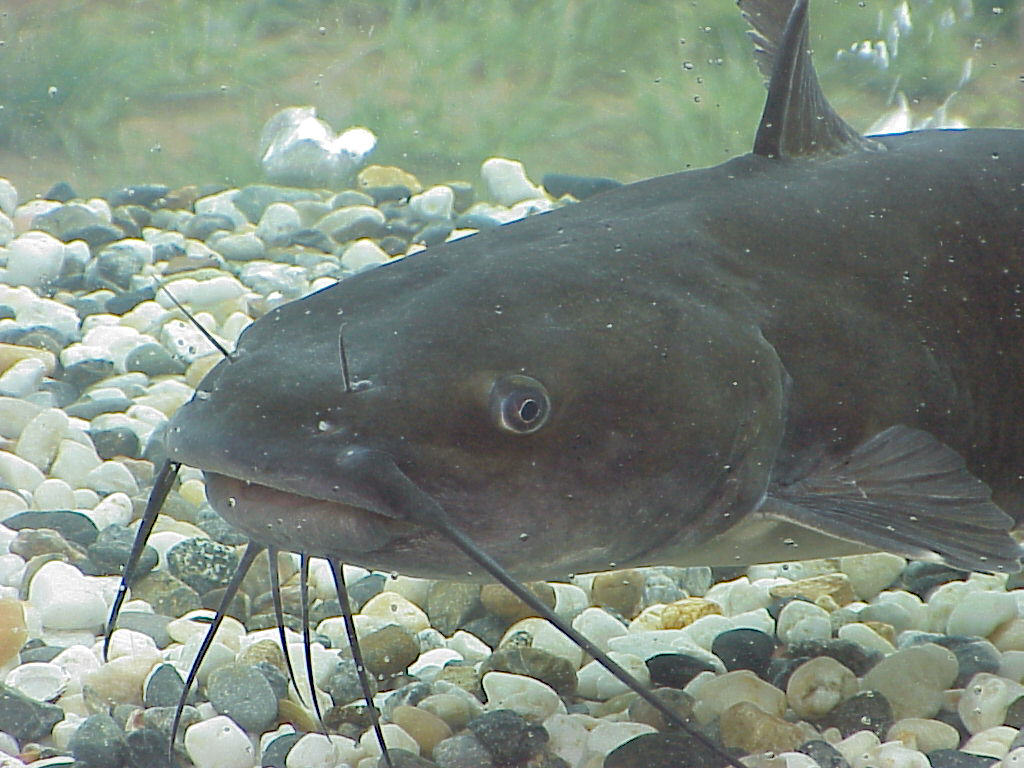
Catfish have millions of taste buds covering their entire bodies.

While most animals' taste buds are located in their mouths, some insects' taste receptors are located on their legs, and some fish have taste buds along their entire bodies. Dogs, cats, and birds have relatively few taste buds (a chicken has about 30), and an adult human has between 2000 and 4000, while a catfish can have more than a million. Herbivores generally have more than carnivores as they need to tell which plants may be poisonous. Not all mammals share the same tastes: some rodents can taste starch, cats cannot taste sweetness, and several carnivores (including hyenas, dolphins, and sea lions) have lost the ability to sense up to four of the five taste modalities found in humans.

== Digestion ==
Food is broken into nutrient components through digestive processes. Proper digestion consists of mechanical processes (chewing, peristalsis) and chemical processes (the actions of digestive enzymes and microorganisms). The digestive systems of herbivores and carnivores are very different as plant matter is harder to digest. Carnivores' mouths are designed for tearing and biting compared to the grinding action found in herbivores. Herbivores, however, have comparatively longer digestive tracts and larger stomachs to aid in digesting the cellulose in plants.

== Food safety ==
According to the World Health Organization (WHO), about 600 million people worldwide get sick, and 420,000 die each year, from eating contaminated food. Diarrhea is the most common illness caused by consuming contaminated food, with about 550 million cases and 230,000 deaths from diarrhea each year. Children under five years of age account for 40% of the burden of foodborne illness, with 125,000 deaths each year.

A 2003 World Health Organization (WHO) report concluded that about 30% of reported food poisoning outbreaks in the WHO European Region occur in private homes. According to the WHO and CDC, in the US alone, annually, there are 76 million cases of foodborne illness leading to 325,000 hospitalizations and 5,000 deaths.

In Vietnam, from 2011 to 2016, on average, there were 668,673 cases of foodborne illness and 21 deaths each year. In addition, during this period, 1,007 food poisoning outbreaks with 30,395 cases of food poisoning were reported.

== See also ==
- Food pairing
- Cuisine
- Lists of foods
- List of food and drink monuments
- List of diets
- Nutrition
