= Monument to Chocolate =

Public sculpture in Pokrov, Russia

- Памятник шоколаду
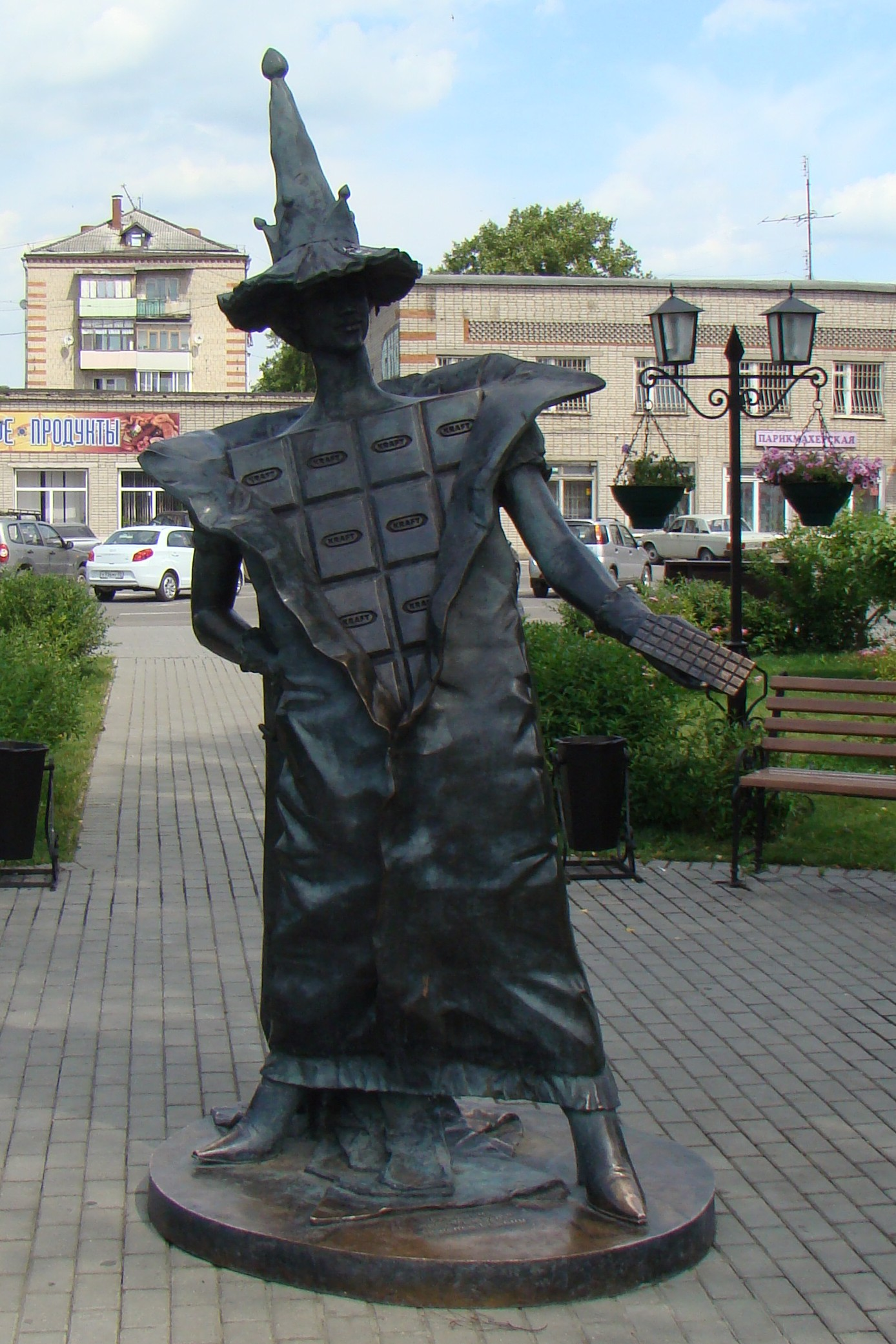
- Interactive map of Monument to Chocolate
- Location: Pokrov, Vladimir Oblast, Russia
- Coordinates: 55°55′05″N 39°10′31″E
- Designer: Ilya Shanin
- Material: Bronze
- Height: 3 metres (9.8 ft)
- Opening date: 1 July 2009

The Monument to Chocolate, commonly known as the Chocolate Fairy (Russian: Шоколадная фея), is a monument in the town of Pokrov, Vladimir Oblast, Russia. It was designed by sculptor Ilya Shanin.

The bronze statue is 3 metres (9.8 ft) tall. It depicts a fairy, shaped like a chocolate bar, holding a bar in their hand. The monument was unveiled on 1 July 2009, not far from the Pokrov Museum of Chocolate.

The monument was given to the town by Kraft Foods to mark the 15th anniversary of the company's operation in Russia.

Twenty sculptors from the cities of Vladimir and Saint Petersburg participated in the competition to design the monument.
