= Kherson Watermelon Monument =

Monument in Kherson Oblast, Ukraine

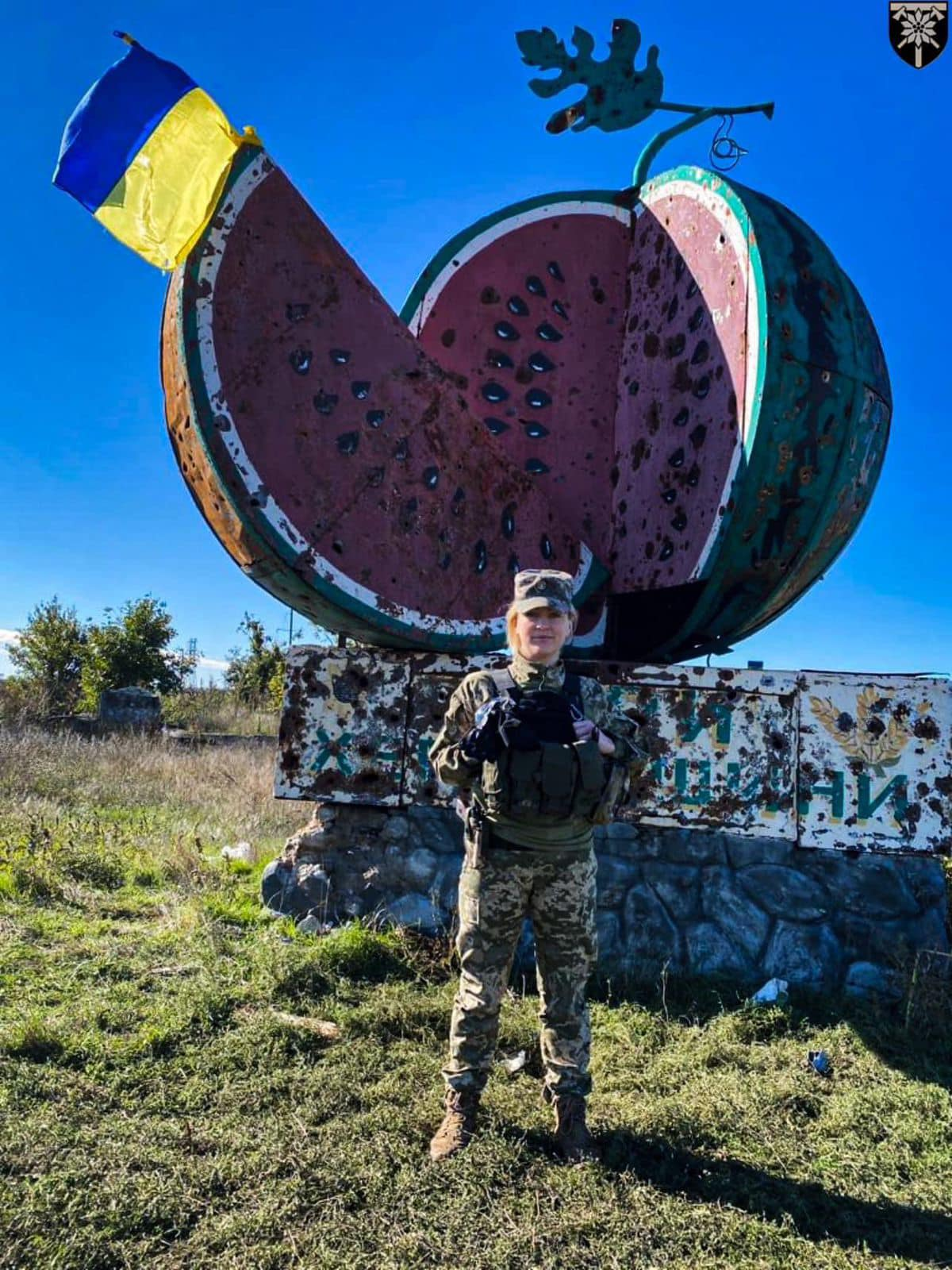
- A member of the 128th Mountain Assault Brigade standing in front of the monument
- Interactive map of Kherson Watermelon Monument
- Location: Osokorivka, Kherson Oblast, Ukraine
- Coordinates: 47°27′46″N 33°52′48″E
- Designer: Serhiy Polinok
- Material: Metal, Concrete
- Height: 4 metres (13 ft)
- Opening date: 1988

The Kherson Watermelon Monument, also known as the "Gifts of Kherson Oblast" Memorial (Ukrainian: Пам'ятний знак «Дари Херсонщини»), is an art object in Kherson Oblast in Ukraine dedicated to the importance of watermelon production to the local economy. The monument was built in 1988, and is located at the village of Osokorivka. It is the first and largest watermelon memorial in Ukraine.

== Characteristics ==
The structure is made of metal and concrete, with a total height of about 4 metres (13 ft). The top of the monument is in the color and shape of a watermelon cut open, with a height of about 2 metres (6 ft 7 in).

== History ==
In 1988, this monument was installed by an order of local collective farm "Ukraine", approval by the head of local rural council in Osokorivka, Viktor Volchenok. The monument was designed by artist Serhiy Polinok, and built by welders Vasyl Pasko and Petro Bondarenko. Some records claim that the monument was not installed until 2003.

During the Russian invasion of Ukraine, the monument came under Russian occupation. It later returned to Ukrainian control as the 128th Mountain Assault Brigade retook the area in early October 2022. The monument was damaged by artillery shell fragments.
