= ICAR Canned Beef Monument =

Sculpture in Sarajevo, Bosnia and Herzegovina

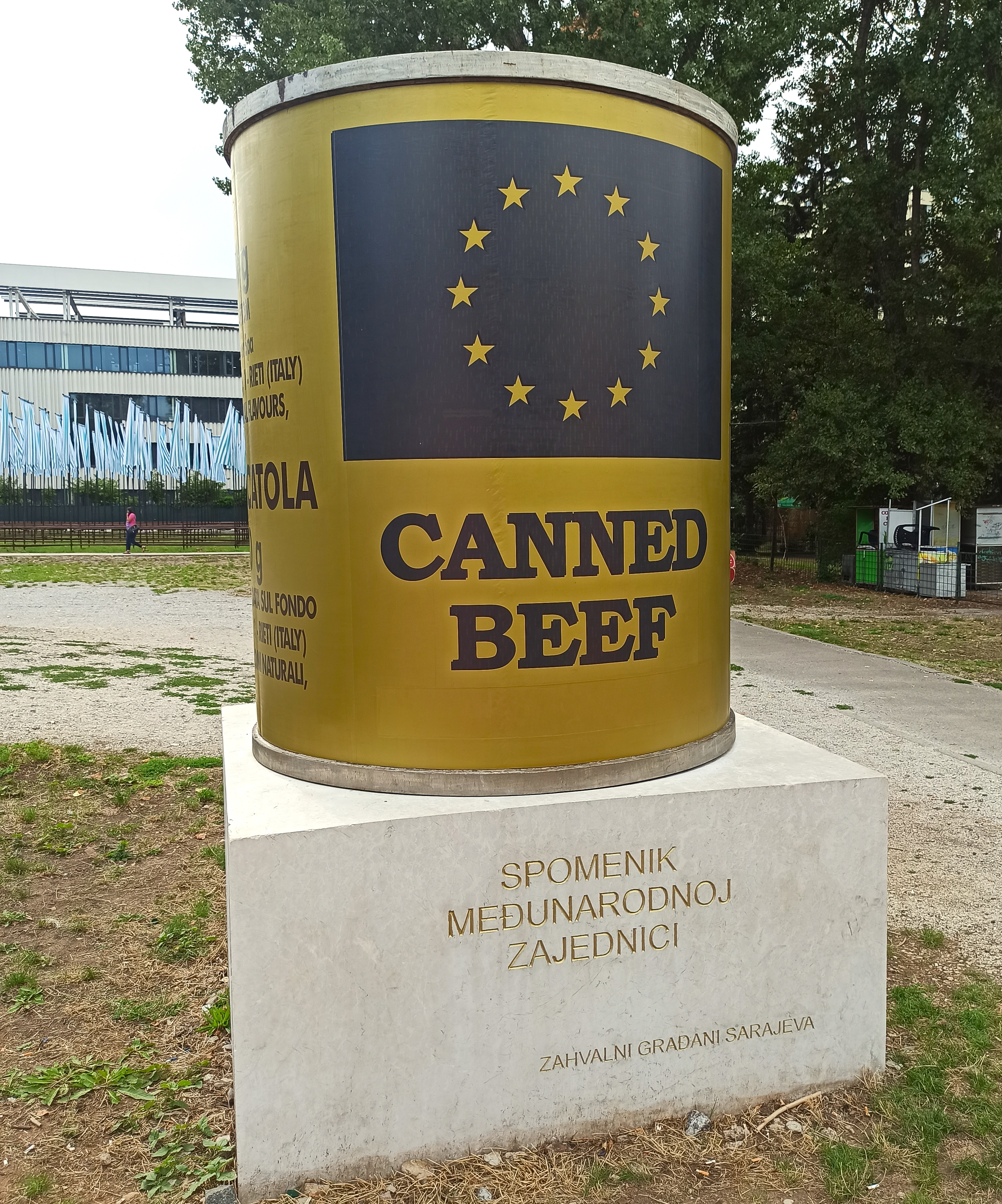
- The monument, cleaned and restored in July 2022

- Location within Bosnia and Herzegovina
- Artist: Nebojša Šerić Šoba
- Year: 2007
- Medium: Steel
- Location: Sarajevo; 43°51′15.6″N 18°24′4.9″E

The ICAR Canned Beef Monument is a public outdoor sculpture in Sarajevo.

== History ==
The sculpture was dedicated on April 6, 2007.

It is located on a walking path that runs behind the Historical Museum of Bosnia and Herzegovina toward the Miljacka River. Designed by Nebojša Šerić Šoba, it is a large representation of a can of beef (a common food supplied during the siege by international organizations), sculpted from painted steel on a marble plinth.

A memorial to the food aid delivered during the Siege of Sarajevo, the inscription on the plinth is "Monument to the International Community by the grateful citizens of Sarajevo". However, in the opinion of the monument's creators, the aid was of the wrong kind: barely-edible canned food, instead of weapons. Some food was supposedly left over from the Vietnam War and over 20 years expired, some consisted of pork (in a city that was half-Muslim), and in popular legend the food was refused by dogs and cats.

Since its dedication it had become graffitied and some paint has peeled. In July 2022 the label on the can was updated and attached. The new label gives credit to the Netherlands for their contributions to the situation, and eliminates the graffiti and wear that had previously been evident.

== See also ==
- Culture of Sarajevo
