= Pokrov, Vladimir Oblast =

Town in Vladimir Oblast, Russia

Pokrov Покров
- Town
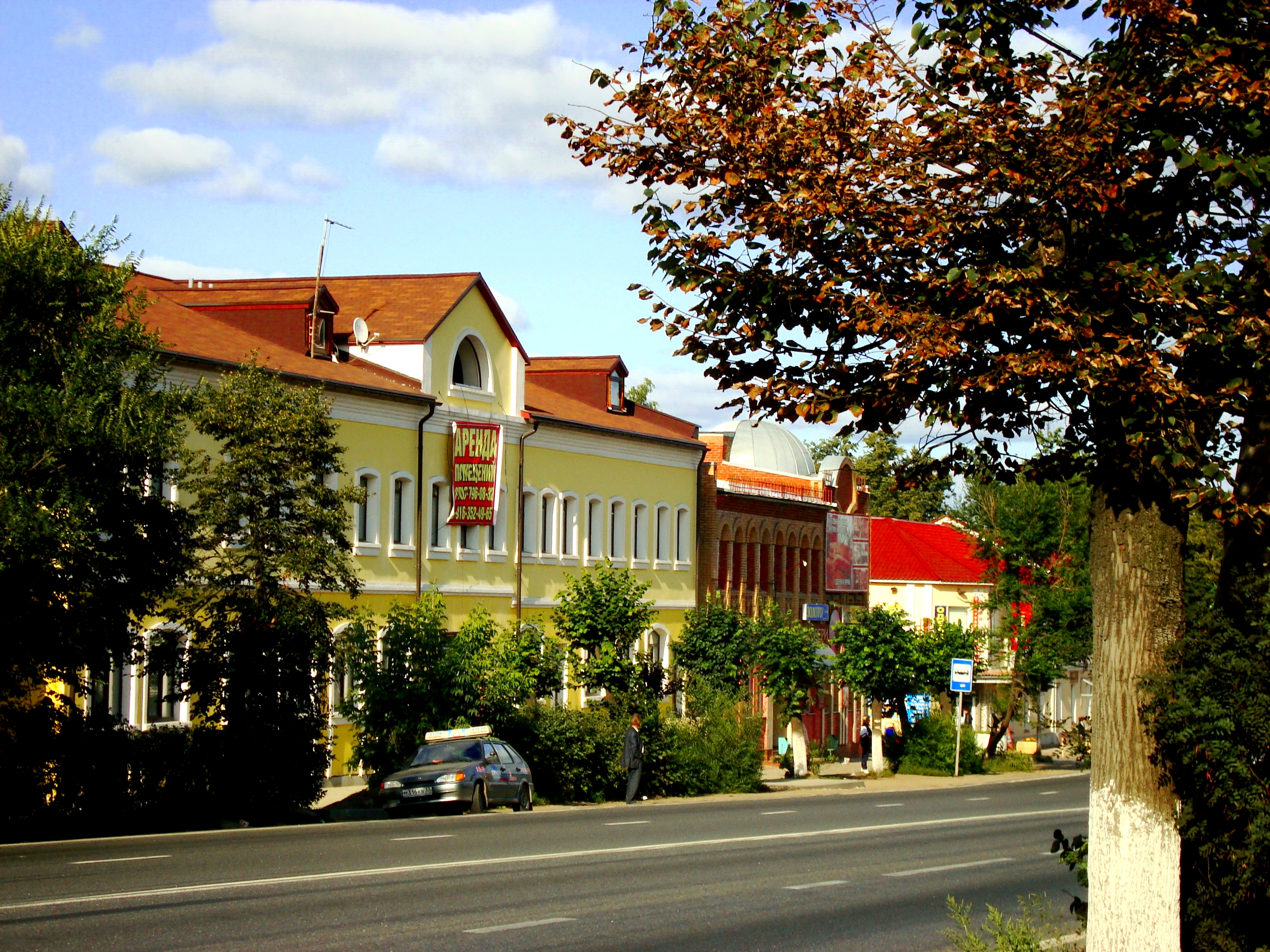
- Lenina Street in Pokrov

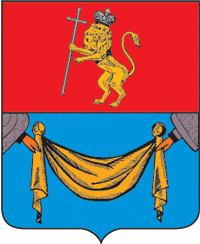
- Coat of arms
- Interactive map of Pokrov
- Location of Pokrov Pokrov (Vladimir Oblast)
- Coordinates: 55°54′42″N 39°11′05″E
- Country: Russia
- Federal subject: Vladimir Oblast
- Administrative district: Petushinsky District
- Founded: 17th century
- Town status since: 1778
- Elevation: 125 m (410 ft)

Population (2010 Census)
  - Total: 17,756
  - Estimate (2021): 17,747 (−0.1%)

Municipal status
  - Municipal district: Petushinsky Municipal District
  - Urban settlement: Pokrov Urban Settlement
  - Capital of: Pokrov Urban Settlement
- Time zone: UTC+3 (MSK)
- Postal code: 601120
- OKTMO ID: 17646120001
- Website: www.pokrovcity.ru

Pokrov (Russian: Покро́в) is a town in Petushinsky District of Vladimir Oblast, Russia, located 5 kilometers (3.1 mi) to the north of the left bank of the Klyazma River (Oka's tributary), 82 kilometers (51 mi) west of Vladimir, the administrative center of the oblast, and 100 kilometers (62 mi) east of Moscow. Population: 17,747 (2021 census); 17,756 (2010 census); 15,920 (2002 census); 15,988 (1989 Soviet census); 2,925 (1897).

== History ==
It was established in the 17th century as a monastery village and was granted town status in 1778.

== Administrative and municipal status ==
Within the framework of administrative divisions, Pokrov is directly subordinated to Petushinsky District. As a municipal division, the town of Pokrov is incorporated within Petushinsky Municipal District as Pokrov Urban Settlement.

=== Local government ===
The Council of Deputies is the representative body of the municipality. It consists of 15 deputies elected in single-member constituencies for a period of five years. Since September 2015, elections have been held every five years on the second Sunday of September. The head of the city is elected from among the deputies by secret ballot for the term of office of the Council of Deputies and is also the chairman of the Council of Deputies. The head of the city is the highest official of the municipal formation of the City of Pokrov.

In the 2020 Russian regional elections, the Council of Deputies of the 7th convocation was elected. On 2 October 2020, Oleg Gennadievich Kislyakov (United Russia, district No. 12) was elected head of the city.

The city administration is an executive and administrative body. It is formed by the head of the city administration and is a permanent body of local government without a set term of office. The head of the city administration is selected through a competition held by the Council of Deputies. Candidates are selected by a competition committee. The head of the city enters into a contract with the selected candidate for the term of office of the Council of Deputies. In case of early resignation, the powers are temporarily exercised by a local government official or an authorized municipal employee.

- Vyacheslav Shalikovich Arakelov - from December 2014 to June 2018 (early resignation)
- Oleg Vladimirovich Kotrov - since 2018, acting head of administration; since March 2019, under contract

== Economy ==
Pokrov has favorable economic and geographical position between the major regional centers of the European part of Russia. The town is home to a Mondelez International chocolate factory, and in 2009 the company commissioned what is believed to be the world's first Monument to Chocolate here.
