= Osokorivka, Kherson Oblast =

Rural locality in Kherson Oblast, Ukraine

Osokorivka Осокорівка
- Interactive map of Osokorivka
- Location in Ukraine Osokorivka (Ukraine)
- Coordinates: 47°26′N 33°55′E
- Country: Ukraine
- Oblast: Kherson Oblast
- Raion: Beryslav Raion
- Village founded: 1783

Area
  - Total: 382.9 km^{2} (147.8 sq mi)
- Elevation: 42 m (138 ft)

Population (2001)
  - Total: 2,747
  - Density: 7.17/km^{2} (18.6/sq mi)
- Time zone: UTC+2 (EET)
  - Summer (DST): UTC+3 (EEST)
- Postal code: 74210
- Area code: +380 5533

Osokorivka (Ukrainian: Осокорівка, Russian: Осокоровка) is a village in Beryslav Raion, Kherson Oblast, southern Ukraine. It belongs to the Novovorontsovka settlement hromada, one of the hromadas of Ukraine. The village had a population of 2,747. The Kherson Watermelon Monument nearby is a notable landmark in the area.

== History ==
The village was founded in 1783 by fugitive serfs from Kyiv, Poltava, Tula, and the Tambov provinces. In 1924, multiple associations of peasants were formed for joint land cultivation called "Komunar" and "Haslo". These merged together in 1931 to form the SZOZ Society. In 1933, the Voroshylov collective farm was established, which in 1935 was divided into two separate collective farms: Voroshylov and Politovidilovets. During the Great Patriotic War, the village was occupied by German troops from 21 August 1941 to 27 February 1944. In 1950, a large collective farm combining the two previous farms and the nearby collective farm named after Joseph Stalin was created, called Ukraine.

Since the start of the Russian invasion of Ukraine in 2022, the village has been briefly occupied by Russian troops, and after they were expelled, the village has been the target of constant shelling. Later reports about the Russian occupation accused Russian forces of holding village elders captive for weeks and torturing them for allegedly collaborating with Ukrainian forces.

== Administrative status ==
Until 18 July 2020, Osokorivka belonged to Novovorontsovka Raion. The raion was abolished in July 2020 as part of the administrative reform of Ukraine, which reduced the number of raions of Kherson Oblast to five. The area of Novovorontsovka Raion was merged into Beryslav Raion.
