= Zaporizke =

Zaporizke (Ukrainian: Запорізьке) may refer to several places in Ukraine:

== Chernihiv Oblast ==
- Zaporizke, village in Bakhmach Raion

== Dnipropetrovsk Oblast ==
- Zaporizke, village in Apostolove urban hromada, Kryvyi Rih Raion
- Zaporizke, village in Sofiivka settlement hromada, Kryvyi Rih Raion
- Zaporizke, village in Nikopol Raion
- Zaporizke, village in Mezhova settlement hromada, Synelnykove Raion
- Zaporizke, village in Slavhorod settlement hromada, Synelnykove Raion
- Zaporizke, village in Velykomykhailivka rural hromada, Synelnykove Raion

== Donetsk Oblast ==
- Zaporizke, village in Volnovakha Raion

== Kharkiv Oblast ==
- Zaporizke, village in Lozova Raion

== Kherson Oblast ==
- Zaporizke, village in Kakhovka Raion

== Luhansk Oblast ==
- Zaporizke, village in Starobilsk Raion

== Zaporizhzhia Oblast ==
- Zaporizke, village in Polohy Raion
- Zaporizke, village in Zaporizhzhia Raion
