= Marianske, Dnipropetrovsk Oblast =

Marianske Мар'янське
- Village
- Location of Marianske within Ukraine Marianske (Ukraine)
- Coordinates: 47°33′08″N 33°54′55″E
- Country: Ukraine
- Oblast: Dnipropetrovsk Oblast
- Raion: Kryvyi Rih Raion
- Hromada: Zelenodolsk Urban Hromada
- First Mentioned: 1782
- Established: 1952
- Incorporated as a village: 1980

Area
  - Total: 1,517 km^{2} (586 sq mi)
- Elevation: 24 m (79 ft)

Population
  - Total: 4 183
  - Density: 715/km^{2} (1,850/sq mi)
- Mail Code: 53842
- Telephone Code: +380 5656

Marianske (Ukrainian: Мар'янське) is a village located in Kryvyi Rih Raion of Dnipropetrovsk Oblast. It belongs to Zelenodolsk urban hromada, one of the hromadas of Ukraine. It has a total population of 4183 people.

== Geography ==
The townlet has an elevation of 24 meters. The village is located on the west bank of the Kakhovka Reservoir. Geographically, the village is located near the border with the Beryslav Raion (Kherson Oblast). The H23 and T0403 highways pass through the village. A large bay separates two banks of the village, where the former Ternivka River used to cross. It is located in Kryvyi Rih Raion of Dnipropetrovsk Oblast.

=== 2020 Raion Reforms ===
Until 18 July 2020, Marianske belonged to Apostolove Raion. The raion was abolished in July 2020 as part of the administrative reform of Ukraine, which reduced the number of raions of Dnipropetrovsk Oblast to seven. The area of Apostolove Raion was merged into Kryvyi Rih Raion.

== History ==
=== Early 20th Century ===
Few documents have been preserved about the first revolutionary uprisings in the village. It is known that in November 1905, the peasants, gathered at the meeting, demanded that local authorities increase land plots, allow free fishing. These demands were not satisfied, and for an anti-government protest against the "existing order" a state fine was imposed on the peasants.

After the February Revolution in Petrograd in 1917, the village community made demands to take land from landowners and wealthy peasants. A land committee was established in the east of the town. The committee's activities developed especially after the October Revolution. He was guided in his activities by the "Temporary Rules for the Regulation of Land Relations", approved on November 27–30, 1917 at the 1st Kherson Plenipotentiary Provincial Congress of Land Committees. Bolshevik-minded peasants demanded the division of land in accordance with Lenin's decree.

On February 23, 1918, the Kherson governorate peasant congress decided to transfer all power to the Soviets, deciding to abolish county and volosny zemstvos. At the same time, the Council of Peasant Deputies was elected in Marianske, which included S. I. Kalchenko, V. I. Mikhno, A. V. Katran, M. S. Nedrenko, headed by G. I. Tkalich. At the end of March 1918, after the occupation of the village by German-Austrian troops, many village activists — V. N. Semka, I. E. Tishchenko, T. I. Kalchenko, P. I. Bezpaly and others joined partisan detachments.

After the end of the Austro-German occupation, the village was occupied by the troops of Symon Petliura, but in early 1919 Marianske came under the control of the Red Army. Soviet authorities were restored in the village, which began to implement the agrarian laws of the Soviet government. The work on the distribution of land was started by the land commission, headed by 3. E. Tokar. On March 8, 1919, the Congress of Soviets of 13 volosts of Kherson area allocated an additional 7328 dessiatinas of land in Mykhailivska and Novovorontsovskaya volosts to Marianska volost. In May 1919, the village was captured by soldiers of ataman Grigoriev.

In August 1919, the village was occupied by the troops of Anton Denikin, who kept it under control until the beginning of 1920. After that, Soviet power was restored in the village. However, this period did not last long. In the autumn of 1920, Marianske and the surrounding settlements were the site of battles of the Red Army against the troops of Peter Wrangel. In October 1920, the front line passed near the village. On October 14, in the area of Marianske, Grushivka and the Tik station, the troops of the Southern Front under the command of Mikhail Frunze defeated three cavalry and two infantry divisions of Peter Wrangel. In the battles, units of the 2nd Cavalry Army, headed by Philip Mironov, especially distinguished themselves. The first to break into Marianske brigade commander Zhuravlev.

During the continuous collectivization in Marianske, 7 agricultural artels were organized on the basis of the commune and societies for joint cultivation of land. Kolkhoz them. Zhdanova specialized in the production of livestock products. In 1938 it had 250 cattle, over 1300 sheep, and 200 pigs. In 2 years, the number of livestock on the collective farm doubled. In 1939, collective farmers received 3 rubles per workday. 20 kopecks. money and 3 kg of grain.

Significant changes occurred in the appearance of Marianske. Instead of clay huts with thatched roofs, collective farmers built new houses covered with iron and tiles. Considerable merit in landscaping the village belonged to the village council, headed by G.O. Nazarenko.

Much attention was paid to the protection of workers' health and public education. Children studied in 5 schools.

=== Holodomor ===
Local residents suffered severely from the Holodomor of 1932–1933. More than 1000 local residents died from the actions of the communist authorities.

=== World War II ===
The population was severely damaged during the temporary occupation of the village by German troops - from August 17, 1941, to February 16, 1944. 600 villagers were forcibly deported to Germany. Several collective farm activists — S. Kudrenko, O. Zaskalko, A. Shemet, D. Suprun, V. Nestroinyi, V. Serdiuk and others — were shot.

Some local residents went to the service of the police, for which they were then severely punished. In the spring of 1942, a specially sent parachute group shot the Hero of the Soviet Union, Lieutenant of the Tank Forces, Makar Tkachev for his transition to the German police.

At the end of September 1943, the Red Army approached the left bank of the Dnieper. On February 11, 1944, the 179th regiment of the 59th Rifle Kramatorsk Order of Suvorov of the Division of the Third Ukrainian Front advanced in the direction of Marianske to cut the highway to Novovorontsovka. More than 70 Soviet soldiers died in the battles for the liberation of Marianske, including: guards major V.I. Fokin, guards captain A.K. Kamenev, guards junior lieutenants M.I. Safronov, A. Bashkatov, sergeants A.D. Buzenko, N.P. Lukash, privates V.M. Kalyuzhny, T.M. Vorobyov and others. In the center of the village is their mass grave.

=== Modern times ===
During 1954–1959, the construction of the Kakhovka reservoir, part of the Marianske bay was moved to a new location. Local residents received from the state the necessary funds for public and housing construction. About 1,000 houses were demolished and rebuilt according to standard projects. In 1965 and 1966, 39 new buildings were built in the village. 30 residential two-storey houses were built on collective farm funds. The concrete plant met the needs for building materials. A water supply system has been laid in the village, a filtration station with a capacity of 4.5 thousand tons has begun to operate. m³ of water per day.

In February 1965, on the basis of the collective farm. Karl Marx State Farm of dairy and grain direction was established in the village.

After the collapse of the Soviet Union, the village became part of the new country of Ukraine.

=== Russo-Ukrainian War ===
At the beginning of the Russian invasion of Ukraine, Marianske was defended by a local territorial defense unit led by Zelenodolsk mayor Dmytro Neveselyi, which held a front line of checkpoints along the Zelenodolsk hromada's border with Kherson Oblast.

According to Neveselyi, Russian forces were able to reach the area of Marianske without encountering resistance. Russian forces apparently fired on a territorial defense checkpoint near Marianske, but did not storm the position.

As of September 2022, Marianske experienced Russian shelling on a near-daily basis. During 2024, Marianske was still regularly shelled by Russian forces, due to its location on the banks of the Kakhovka Reservoir.

== Population ==
According to the 1989 Ukrainian SSR census, the population of the village was 4428, of which 2026 were men and 2402 were women.

According to the 2001 Ukrainian census, the village had a population of 4172 people.

== Language ==
The mother tongue of the population was collected in the 2001 census as:

Language	Percentage of Population (%)
Ukrainian	93,81
Russian	5,57
Belarusian	0,33
Armenian	0,26
Moldovan	0,02
