= Kryvyi Rih strikes (2022–present) =

Series of attacks in Kryvyi Rih since 2022

- Part of the Russo-Ukrainian war
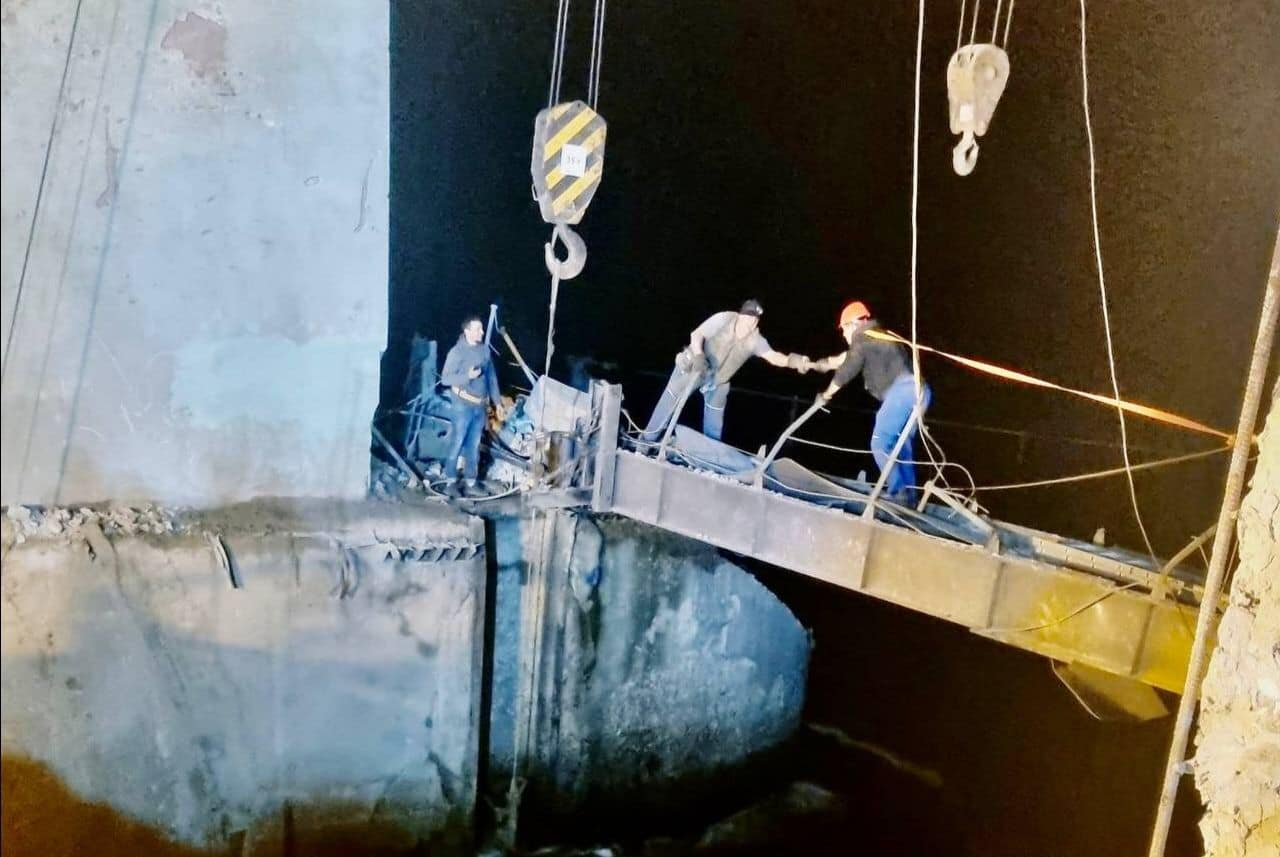
- The Karachunivske Reservoir at Kryvyi Rih after shelling by Russian forces
Date	24 February 2022 – present
Location	Kryvyi Rih

Belligerents
Russia	Ukraine

Units involved
Russian Armed Forces	Armed Forces of Ukraine: Territorial Defense Forces

Russian forces have carried out a series of artillery fire and air raids on the city of Kryvyi Rih during the Russo-Ukrainian war.

== 2022 attacks ==
=== February ===
On 24 February 2022, military warehouses of the 17th Mechanized Brigade in Kryvyi Rih, near the Makulan microdistrict were attacked.

=== April ===
On 7 April, there were three shellings on the territory of Dnipropetrovsk Oblast. The occupiers struck the Synelnykove and Kryvyi Rih districts; four people were killed, seven were injured, and two citizens went missing. A rocket also hit a private residential sector in Kryvyi Rih.

On 18 April, Russians attacked the Kryvyi Rih District.

=== July ===
On 25 July, at 2 a.m., the Metallurgical District of Kryvyi Rih was shelled with cluster munitions from the Russian Tornado-S MLRS. It is stated that there were no victims.

=== September ===
On 3 September, the settlement community of Shyroke in the Kryvyi Rih District came under fire.

On 8 September, Russian troops tried to launch a missile attack on Kryvyi Rih, but was later blocked by the Ukrainian Air Defense Forces.

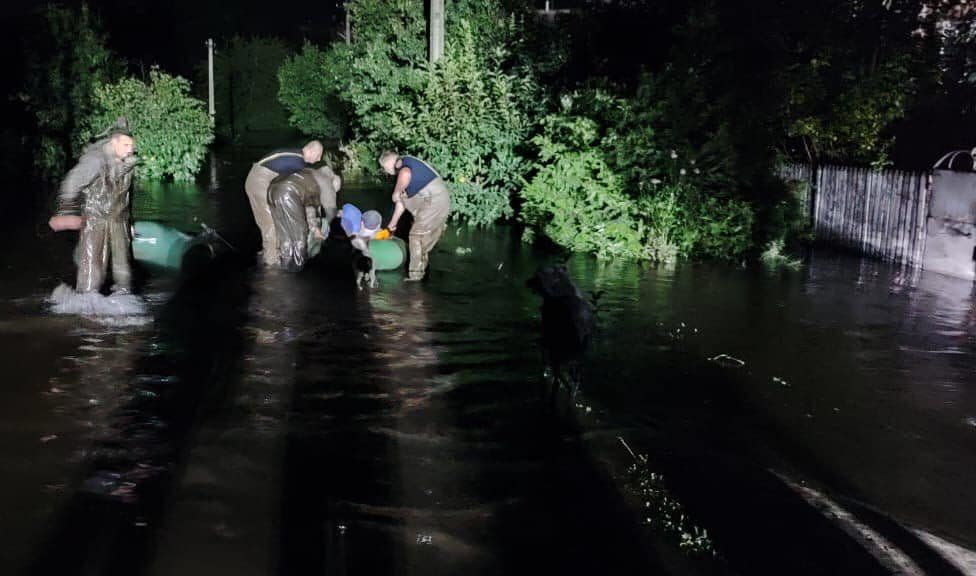
Flood after destruction of the dam

On 14 September, at around 17:00, Russia carried out a missile attack on Kryvyi Rih, firing at least 7 Iskander and Kinzhal missiles at the city. 6 of them struck in the area of the Karachunivka Reservoir. After the missile attack, the water level in the Inhulets River rose by approximately 1–2 meters, with 112 private cottages flooded. There were also interruptions in the water supply in several areas of Kryvyi Rih. About 5,000 residents of the Sofiivka settlement community were left without water supply and 7,000 residents of the Lozuvatka village community. At midnight on 15 September, the head of the military administration of Kryvyi Rih, Oleksandr Vilkul, announced the partial evacuation of two adjacent districts of Kryvyi Rih due to the rise of the water level in the Inhulets River to a historical maximum. Emergency services had to carry out two controlled bursts on the dam downstream to increase the carrying capacity of the Inhulets River and lower the water level. By 16 September, the water in the Inhulets turned red. Media speculated that this was the result of a change in the course of the river and its flow on clay soils. The sluice gates of the dam, which were hit by a missile, were covered with loam and rubble. Eventually, water supply was stabilized in Kryvyi Rih. The head of the Dnipropetrovsk state administration, Valentin Reznichenko, said that in the afternoon of 16 September, the Russians struck another blow at the critical infrastructure, as a result of which hydrotechnical structures suffered serious destruction. The Minister of Environmental Protection and Natural Resources of Ukraine, Ruslan Strelets, said that the destruction of the hydrotechnical protective structure of the Karachunivka Reservoir could cause a man-made catastrophe with consequences for the environment and people.

On 26 September, the Russians fired Kh-59 missiles at Kryvyi Rih International Airport, damaging its infrastructure.

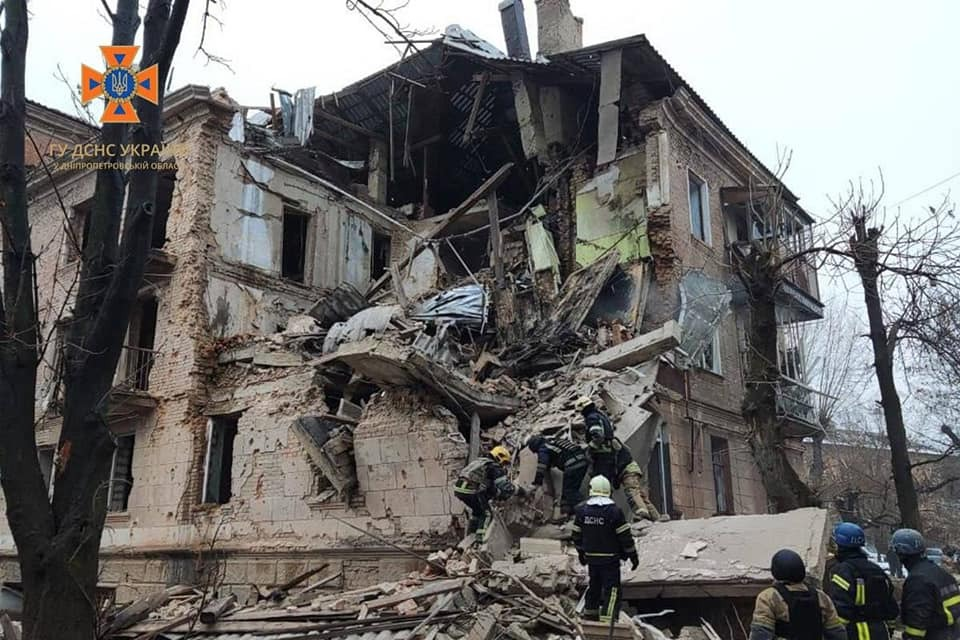
Residential building in Kryvyi Rih after the strike on 16 December 2022

=== December ===
On 16 December, Russian missile destroyed a residential building in Kryvyi Rih, killing 4 people and injuring 13.

== 2023 attacks ==
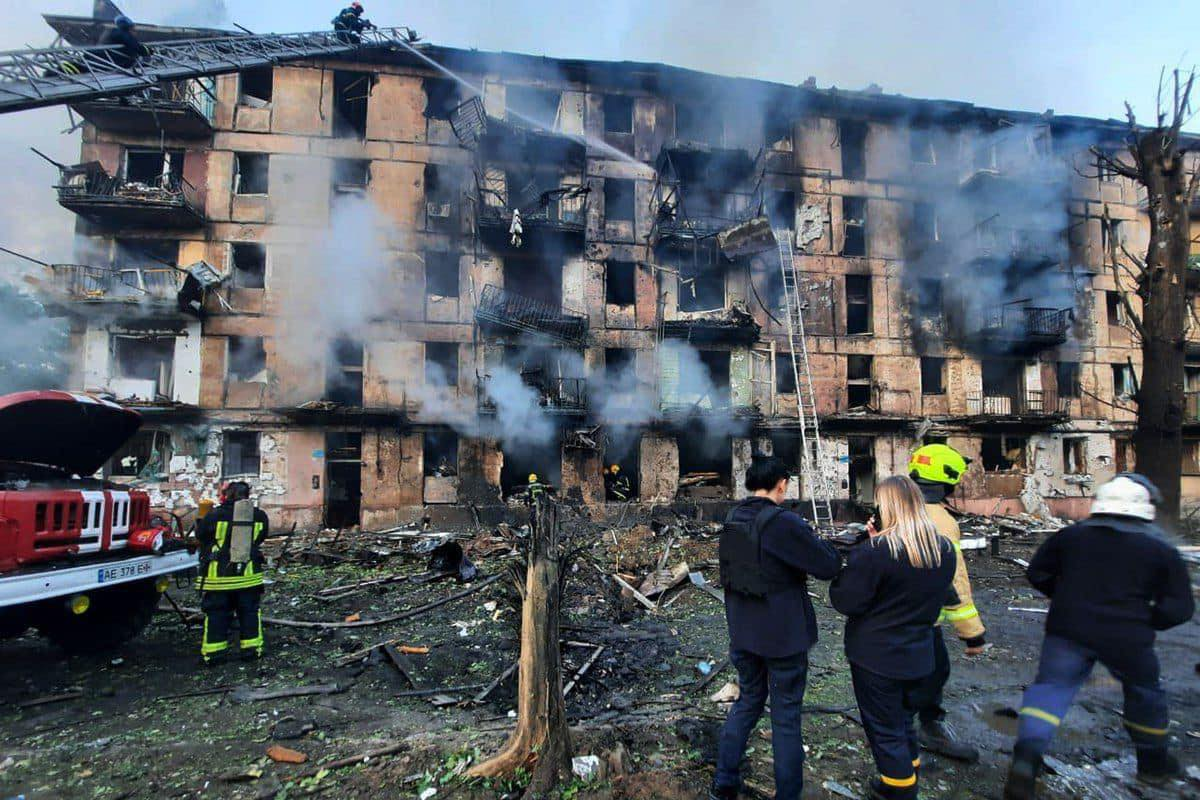
Residential building in Kryvyi Rih after the attack on 13 June 2023

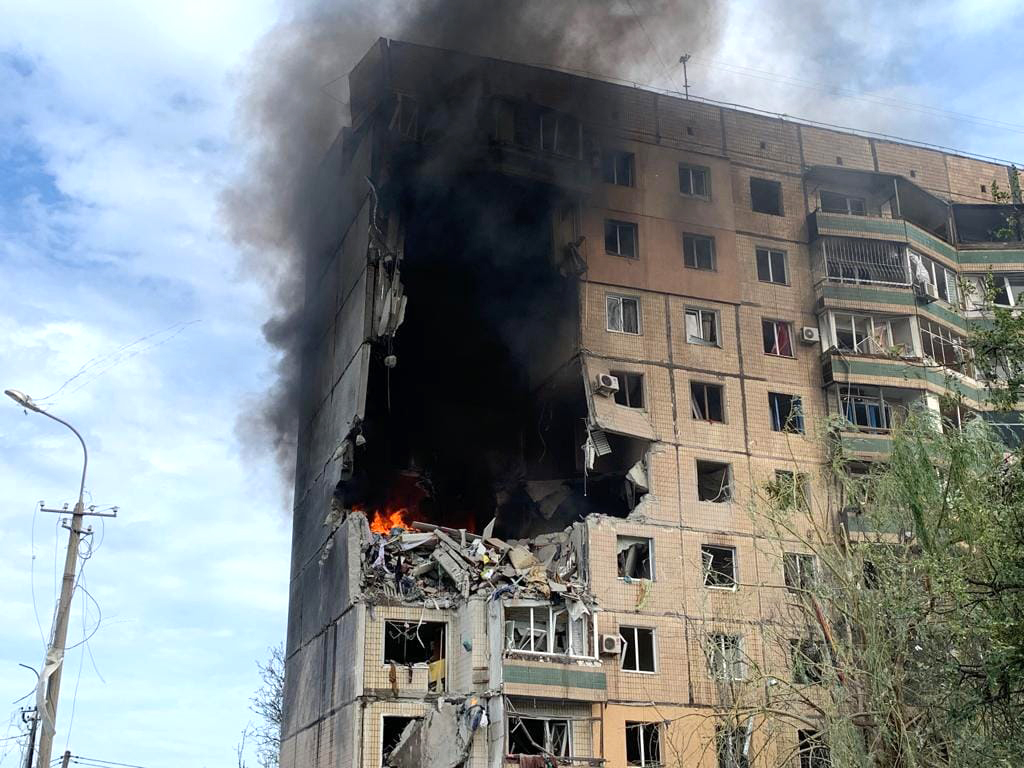
Residential building in Kryvyi Rih after the attack on 31 July 2023

=== June ===
During the night of 13 June 2023, around 3:30 a.m., Russia launched Kh-101/X-101 long range missile strikes against an apartment block and warehouses in Kryvyi Rih. 12 civilians were killed while 38 were wounded. The Ukrainian Minister of Internal Affair Ihor Klymenko visited the scene of the explosion that day and showed journalists around, noting that no military targets or barracks can be found around the damaged apartment building. Ukrainian President Volodymyr Zelenskyy, who was born and grew up in Kryvyi Rih, condemned the attack. Kryvyi Rih's mayor Oleksandr Vilkul also denied any military value in the damaged apartment building.

=== July ===
On 31 July 2023 Russian army launched on the city two ballistic missiles. A 9-storey residential building and a university building were partially destroyed. Six people died and 81 were injured.

== 2024 attacks ==
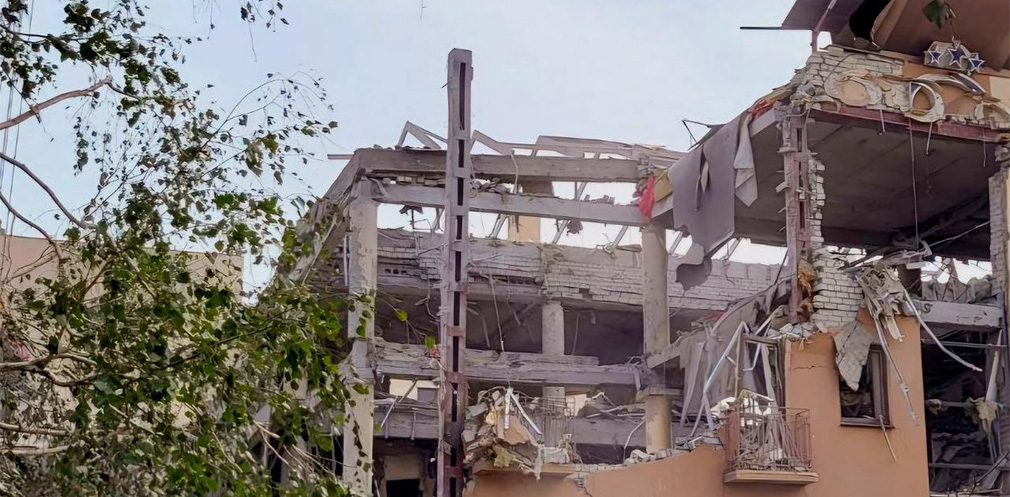
Hotel in Kryvyi Rih after the strike on 27 August 2024

=== March ===
On 12 March 2024, Russian missiles hit two residential buildings, one five storeys, the other nine storeys. Three civilians were killed and ten further injured. Several people were trapped under the rubble, but were saved by rescue workers.

=== August ===
In the night on 27 August 2024, Russia fired a missile on a hotel "Aurora" in the center of Kryvyi Rih. 4 people were killed and 5 injured.

=== September ===
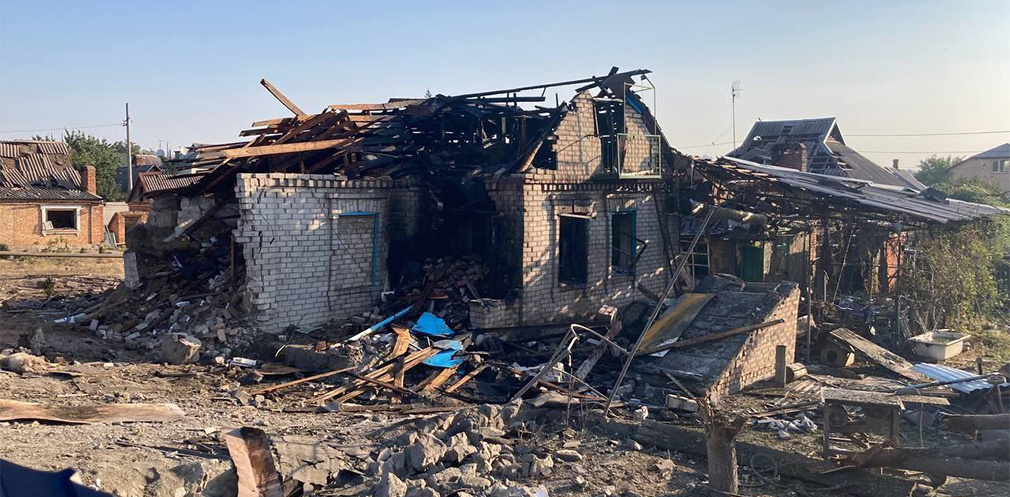
House in Kryvyi Rih after the strike on 21 September 2024

In the night on 21 September, Russian missile attack caused destructions of private houses in the city. Three people were killed and three more injured.

== 2025 attacks ==
=== January ===
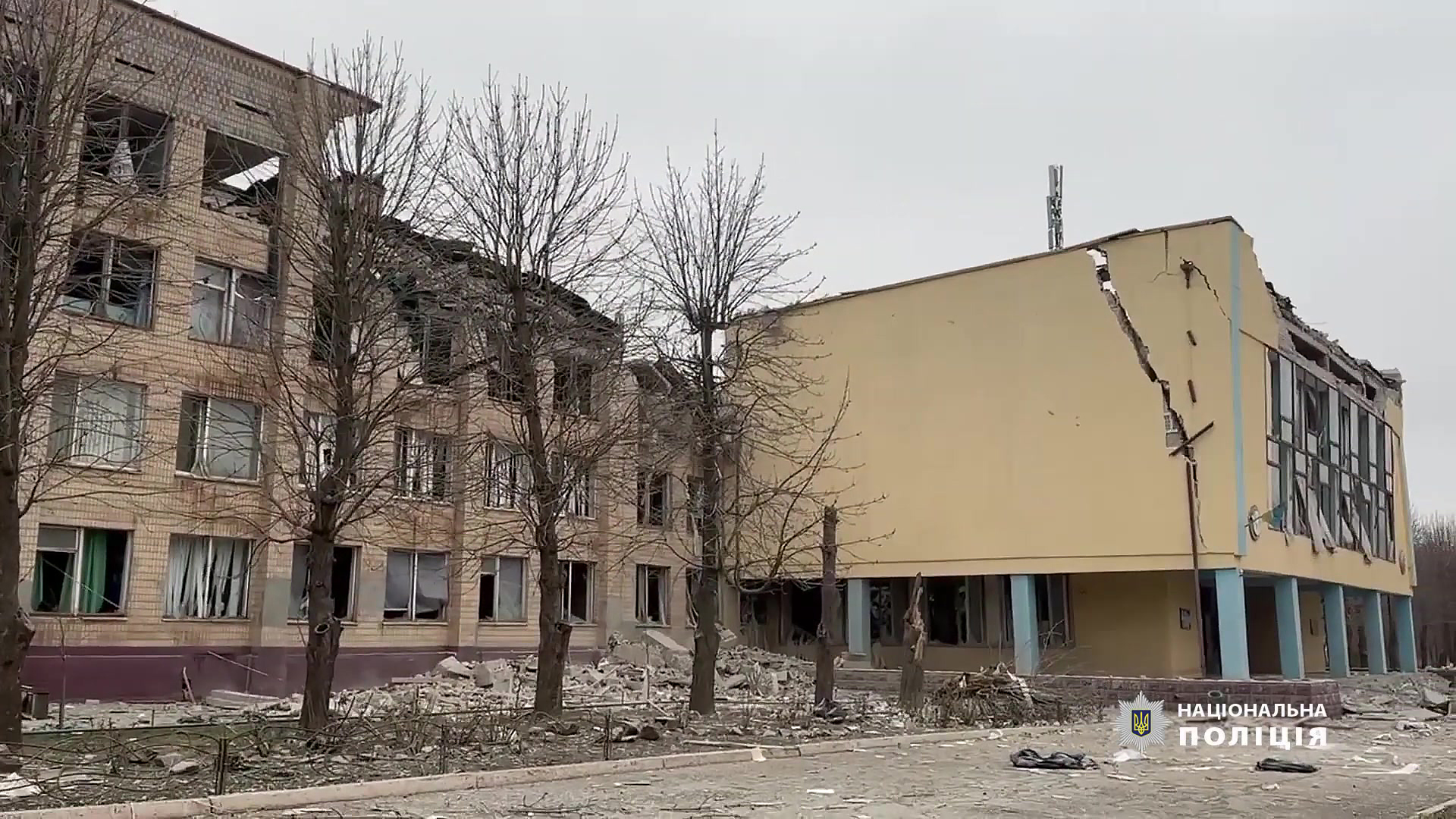
Aviation college in Kryvyi Rih after the strike on 17 January 2025

On 17 January Russian missile attack partially destroyed Kryvyi Rih college of National Aviation University and damaged residential buildings. 4 people died, 14 were injured.

=== February ===
On 22 February a Russian missile destroyed the local Saint Stephen church belonging to the Ukrainian Orthodox Church (Moscow Patriarchate), the attack also damaged civilian infrastructure. 1 person died and 5 people were injured (no casualties in the church).

=== March ===
On 6 March, a Russian missile attack killed 4 and wounded 32 in a hotel in Kryvyi Rih. Several humanitarian volunteers from Ukraine, United States and United Kingdom were in the hotel grounds during the strike.

=== April ===
On 4 April 2025, Russian ballistic missile and cluster munition attacks targeted apartment buildings, playground, six education institutes, shops and businesses. 19 civilians were killed, and a further 72 were injured.

== 2026 attacks ==
=== August ===
On August 21, Russian drone strikes on a shopping center in Kryvyi Rih killed at least 16 people and injured more than 130 others, including 22 children.

== Reactions ==
As a result of the shelling of the Karachunivske Reservoir on 14 September 2022, the President of Ukraine, Volodymyr Zelenskyy, stated that Russia attempted to flood Kryvyi Rih:

The terrorist country continues to fight against the civilian population. This time —missile strikes on hydraulic structures and an attempt to flood Kryvyi Rih. All the occupiers can do is to sow panic, create an emergency, try to leave people without light, heat, water and food.

— Volodymyr Zelenskyy,

The head of the military administration of Kryvyi Rih, Oleksandr Vilkul, also addressed the Russians' attempt to flood Kryvyi Rih:

Dear residents of Kryvyi Rih, today the Russians committed another terrorist act. It hit a very large hydrotechnical structure in Kryvyi Rih with eight cruise missiles. The effort is to simply wash off a part of our city with water.

— Oleksandr Vilkul,

The Institute for the Study of War said that Russia launched a missile attack on the dam to deter a counteroffensive by the Ukrainian Armed Forces in southern Ukraine, preventing future operations by the Armed Forces of Ukraine on the Inhulets.

== See also ==
- Russian war crimes
- Odesa strikes (2022–present)
- Lviv strikes (2022–present)
