= Kalashnyky =

Kalashnyky may refer to:

- Kalashnyky, Kremenchuk Raion, Poltava Oblast, a village in Kremenchuk Raion, Poltava Oblast, Ukraine
- Kalashnyky, Poltava Raion, Poltava Oblast, a village in Poltava Raion, Poltava Oblast, Ukraine
- Kalashnyky, Dnipropetrovsk Oblast, a village in Kryvyi Rih Raion, Dnipropetrovsk Oblast, Ukraine

== See also ==
- Kalashnik (disambiguation)
