= Pavlo Lazarenko =

Prime Minister of Ukraine from 1996 to 1997

- Павло Лазаренко
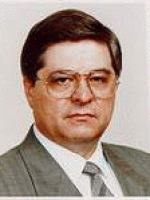
- Official portrait, 1998

5th Prime Minister of Ukraine
- In office 28 May 1996 – 2 July 1997
- President: Leonid Kuchma
- Preceded by: Yevhen Marchuk
- Succeeded by: Valeriy Pustovoitenko

6th First Vice Prime Minister of Ukraine
- In office 5 September 1995 – 28 May 1996
- Prime Minister: Yevhen Marchuk
- Preceded by: Viktor Pynzenyk
- Succeeded by: Vasyl Durdynets

Governor of Dnipropetrovsk Oblast
- In office March 1992 – June 1994
- President: Leonid Kravchuk
- Preceded by: Mykola Zadoya
- Succeeded by: Mykola Derkach

Chairman of the Dnipropetrovsk Oblast Council
- In office 26 June 1994 – 14 May 1998
- Preceded by: Viktor Bogatyr
- Succeeded by: Eduard Dubinin

People's Deputy of Ukraine
- In office 15 May 1990 – 18 June 1992
- Constituency: Dnipropetrovsk Oblast, No. 107
- In office 24 July 1994 – 7 February 2002
- Constituency: Dnipropetrovsk Oblast, No. 105 (1994–1998); Dnipropetrovsk Oblast, No. 40 (1998–2002)

Personal details
- Born: 23 January 1953 (age 73) Karpivka, Shyroke Raion, Ukrainian SSR, Soviet Union (now Ukraine)
- Party: Hromada (1994–2002)
- Other political affiliations: CPSU (1985–1991)
- Spouse: Tamara
- Children: 6

Military service
- Allegiance: Soviet Union
- Branch/service: Soviet Army
- Years of service: 1971–1973

Pavlo Ivanovych Lazarenko (Ukrainian: Павло Іванович Лазаренко, Ukrainian pronunciation: [pɐu̯ˈlɔ iˈwanowɪt͡ʃ lɐzɐˈrɛnko]; born 23 January 1953) is a Ukrainian convicted criminal, international fugitive, and a former politician who served as Prime Minister of Ukraine from 1996 to 1997.

Born in 1953 to a peasant family in southern Ukraine, Lazarenko was active in agricultural activities before joining politics in the late 1980s. Originally Governor of Dnipropetrovsk Oblast, Lazarenko was in 1995 made First Vice Prime Minister of Ukraine for energy affairs, placing him in charge of acquiring energy from foreign countries. Less than a year later, he was appointed by President Leonid Kuchma as prime minister, serving for just over a year before being replaced by Valeriy Pustovoitenko on 2 July 1997.

Lazarenko's time as prime minister and subsequent trials have established him as one of the most corrupt, authoritarian, and unpopular politicians in Ukrainian history. According to United Nations reports, Lazarenko stole around $200 million from the Ukrainian government. Following his 1999 flight from Ukraine, Lazarenko fled to the United States, where he was subsequently tried for extortion, money laundering, and wire fraud, and sentenced. Since 1999, he has been living in exile in the United States due to criminal charges against him in Ukraine.

== Early life and career ==
=== Birth and family ===
Pavlo Lazarenko was born in the village of Karpivka (located near Kryvyi Rih) on 23 January 1953 into a family of peasant farmers. His father, Ivan Tryfonovych Lazarenko, was born in 1926 in the village of Hnidyn, near Kyiv. Following Ivan's birth, the family moved to what is now Kherson Oblast, where they worked as farmers. In 1932, the family Lazarenko family moved again to Karpivka, where Pavlo would be born. Pavlo's grandfather, Tryfon Lazarenko, joined the Red Army in 1944 and was killed during World War II. After the war, Ivan established a 560 ha (1,400 acres) farm in Karpivka, where Pavlo was born.

=== Early career ===
In 1970, Pavlo got a job as a driver in the kolkhoz "Zoria Komunizma" (Dawn of Communism), in Shyroke Raion. From May 1971 to June 1973, Lazarenko served in the Soviet Army, on the border with Afghanistan.

After his military service, from 1973 to 1978 Lazarenko studied at the Dnipropetrovsk State Agrarian University in the Agronomic Department. After graduating, Lazarenko was recognised as an agronomist. From 1978 to 1983, he worked variously as agronomist, chief agronomist, and head of kolkhoz administration in the Kalinin kolkhoz in Novomoskovsk Raion.

In 1984, Lazarenko was appointed a head of agricultural department of Tsarychanka Raion. From 1985 to 1987 he worked as a Communist Party functionary in Tsarychanka Raion, and from 1987 to 1990, Lazarenko worked for the Communist Party of Dnipropetrovsk Oblast in agricultural production and food industry sectors. In February 1990, he was elected as head of Agro-Industrial Complex of Dnipropetrovsk Oblast.

== Governor of Dnipropetrovsk Oblast ==
In August 1991, shortly following the Declaration of Independence of Ukraine, Lazarenko was chosen as First Deputy Governor of Dnipropetrovsk Oblast.

In March 1992, President of Ukraine Leonid Kravchuk appointed Lazarenko as Governor of Dnipropetrovsk Oblast. Lazarenko's candidacy was nominated by the council of working groups conference of the Dnipropetrovsk State Agrarian University, whose decision was supported by over 200 groups. Leonid Kuchma, then a People's Deputy, at that time proposed Valeriy Pustovoitenko, who would also later become prime minister.

Lazarenko remained as Governor until June 1994. Although he sided with incumbent Kravchuk in the 1994 Ukrainian presidential election, he managed to establish close ties with the election winner, Leonid Kuchma.

== First Vice Prime Minister of Ukraine ==
At the recommendation of the Prime Minister of Ukraine Yevhen Marchuk, Kuchma appointed Lazarenko the First Vice Prime Minister for Energy Affairs on 5 September 1995. As the government official in energy affairs, he was charged with a task of negotiating gas supplies with Russia and Turkmenistan. Already next year in 1996, Ukraine reported no debts to the Russian Gazprom for the first since its independence. In 1996 Lazarenko became Doctor of Economic Sciences.

== Prime Minister of Ukraine ==
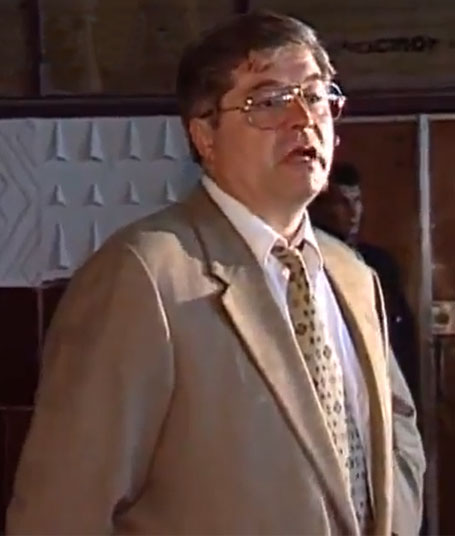
Lazarenko in 1996

On 28 May 1996, Kuchma confirmed Lazarenko as the Prime Minister of Ukraine within the powers stipulated by the existing "Constitutional Agreement". On 10 July 1996, less than two weeks after adopting a new Constitution of Ukraine, the Verkhovna Rada approved the appointment of Lazarenko as prime minister.

On 16 July 1996, Lazarenko survived an attempt on his life when a bomb exploded near his blocked car en route from Kyiv to Boryspil airport.

=== Conflict with the Donetsk Clan and murders of opponents ===
Lazarenko was involved in a prolonged and bitter struggle for economic domination with the emerging Donetsk Clan, an industrial and political group based in Donetsk and led by Viktor Yanukovych.

Lazarenko has been linked to the deaths of several of his political opponents, though he has repeatedly denied his involvement in any assassinations. On 3 November 1996, Yevhen Shcherban, a prominent member of the Verkhovna Rada and natural gas executive, was murdered at Donetsk Airport, a few months after the assassination attempt on Lazarenko, which some media sources accused Shcherban of having a role in.

Following his departure from the office of prime minister, Lazarenko also allegedly ordered the assassination of Vadym Hetman, an independent People's Deputy who had been active in economic reform efforts.

=== Privatisation ===
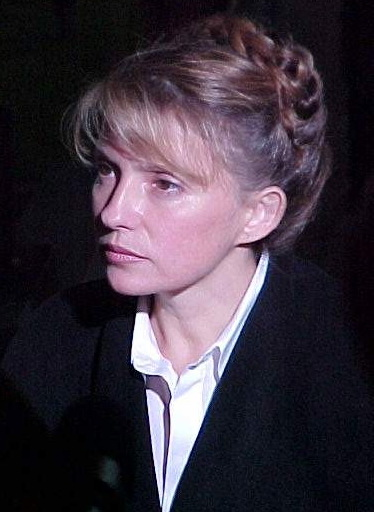
Yulia Tymoshenko (pictured here in 2002) was important in Lazarenko's privatisation efforts.

While in charge of the Cabinet, Lazarenko reportedly exercised control over many lucrative business projects and speculatively charged 50 percent of profits for his patronage. At that time, he maintained a close business relationship with Yulia Tymoshenko, then the CEO of United Energy Systems of Ukraine, a monopoly that imported Russian natural gas. Forbes described Lazarenko and Tymoshenko as "the Ukrainian Bonnie and Clyde" for their theft of money in the oil and gas sector.

He may have also plotted against Oleksandr Volkov, a close associate of President Kuchma. Reportedly, Volkov became aware of the planned assassination and made a phone call to Lazarenko threatening appropriate revenge.

=== Corruption ===
According to a report by the United Nations, approximately $200,000,000 was looted by Lazarenko from the government of Ukraine during his tenure in office.

Lazarenko is reported to have abused his official authority as Prime Minister of Ukraine to extort nearly 50% of businessman Peter Kiritchenko's $60 million in profits. Lazarenko then ordered him to assist in laundering the proceeds to accounts in Poland, Switzerland, Antigua, and eventually in the United States, where a shell company was used to conceal his property purchases. Kiritchenko pleaded guilty to one count of receipt of stolen property and agreed to testify against Lazarenko.

In 1998, he made unlawful transfers of $2.3 million from one Dugsbery account at WestAmerica Bank, which can be traced back to Mr. Lazarenko's Lady Lake bank account in the Bahamas, to an account at Bank Boston Robertson Stevens. Both the funds in this account and those in a San Francisco EuroFed can be traced back to Lazarenko's CARPO-53 account, where he deposited funds from the Naukovy fraud and from his extortion of Mr. Kiritchenko's funds. In total, Lazarenko was found to have laundered over $15 million from his Swiss bank account which ultimately ended up in Kiritchenko's EuroFed accounts in San Francisco. A Geneva court in June 2000 tried and convicted Lazarenko in absentia for laundering $6.6 million in illicit proceeds.

In a special investigative report conducted by Kelly Carr and Brian Grow, two Reuters journalists, it is stated that Lazarenko "was once ranked the eighth-most corrupt official in the world by watchdog group Transparency International" and that "Court records submitted in Lazarenko's criminal case and documents from a separate civil lawsuit, as well as interviews with lawyers familiar with the matter, indicate Lazarenko controls a shelf company incorporated in Cheyenne that owns an estimated $72 million in real estate in Ukraine through other companies". Lazarenko's shelf corporation is reportedly named Capital Investments Group.

He acquired the majority of his illegal funds through his activities in the gas and energy sector of Ukraine, both as Vice Prime Minister for Energy Affairs and as prime minister. He was reported by Radio Free Europe/Radio Liberty to have been guilty of money laundering in the United States, and has routinely been on Transparency International's lists of most corrupt officials.

In the 2004 Global Corruption Report, Lazarenko made it into the list of the World's Most Corrupt Leaders. He was listed eighth, and was said to have amassed between $114 million to $200 million.

== Fall from power ==
By mid-1997, Lazarenko had fallen out of favour with Kuchma, who suspected him of making plans to run for president in the 1999 Ukrainian presidential election. Kuchma later regretted Lazarenko's appointment as his "gravest mistake".

Lazarenko, who had no previous record of serious illness, was unexpectedly hospitalised in late June 1997. It has been alleged that he spent the two weeks of the leave for the sickness in vain attempts to mend fences with Kuchma. Technically, under the Ukrainian labour code law, a hospitalized individual may not be terminated from his position. However, when his dismissal became imminent, Lazarenko resigned on 2 July 1997, on his own initiative.

In the 1998 Ukrainian parliamentary election, he was once again elected to the Verkhovna Rada from electoral district No. 40 of Dnipropetrovsk Oblast as part of Hromada party. In the Verkhovna Rada, Lazarenko became a leader of the Hromada parliamentary faction. Hromada frequently sided with Socialist Party of Ukraine of Oleksandr Moroz.

== Flight from Ukraine and criminal charges ==
In December 1998, Lazarenko was arrested in Basel, Switzerland as he entered the country on a Panamanian passport. Lazarenko was charged with money laundering, and indicted. However, he was released on bail shortly afterwards, and fled Europe to the United States in 1999, fearing retribution from Kuchma after his fall from grace.

In February 1999, shortly after arriving in the United States, Lazarenko was again arrested, this time on charges of visa irregularities. This case soon expanded to cover Lazarenko's various crimes, and he was eventually convicted of extortion, money laundering, and wire fraud in 2004, and sentenced to 9 years in federal prison on 25 August 2006.

On 18 October 2006, an appeal stemming from Lazarenko's conviction (but not the appeal of the conviction) was heard by a three-judge panel of the United States Court of Appeals for the Ninth Circuit, which included former Supreme Court Justice Sandra Day O'Connor sitting by designation. Lazarenko was incarcerated at the Federal Correctional Institution in Dublin, California. U.S. District Court Judge Charles Breyer cut Lazarenko's sentence from 108 to 97 months in prison on 19 November 2009. The court took into account that the Ninth Circuit Court of Appeals had dismissed approximately half the counts he was convicted of, leaving convictions only for acts committed 17 years previously.

In November 2009, Interior Minister of Ukraine Yuriy Lutsenko stated that if Lazarenko returned to Ukraine he would be detained, as he was on the international wanted list.

Lazarenko was imprisoned at FCI Terminal Island until 1 November 2012. Following the end of his sentence, he applied for residency in the United States, citing the 2011 arrest of Yulia Tymoshenko, who was coincidentally a close ally of Lazarenko as prime minister. According to Lazarenko's defense lawyer Viktor Chevhuz, the United States Citizenship and Immigration Services were to deal with this application by the end of 2013. Chevhuz claimed that this could lead to the demand to Lazarenko to leave the country within 72 hours with the right to fly anywhere, or, "A deportation to a country from which he arrived - Greece, because there is no extradition treaty with Ukraine". Chevhuz further expected Lazarenko to not return to Ukraine "as the criminal cases against him, which had been previously dropped, may be reopened".

Immediately after his 1 November 2012 release, the Prosecutor General's Office of Ukraine stated that as soon as Lazarenko would return to Ukraine he would be arrested for his involvement in around 50 criminal cases. In 2012, Prosecutor General of Ukraine Viktor Pshonka announced the involvement of Lazarenko, alongside Tymoshenko, in the murder of Yevhen Shcherban and Alexander Momot in 1996, and the assassination of banker Vadym Hetman.

Lazarenko formerly owned a $6.75 million mansion in Marin County, California, which was purchased with money from the Ukrainian budget. In 2013, US authorities confiscated the mansion, in connection with his 2004 money laundering conviction. Authorities have also sanctioned the seizure of a Pablo Picasso lithograph he is rumoured to possess.

As of July 2016, he was living with his wife and children in California, with his application for asylum still pending. Lazarenko was mentioned in the Panama Papers and the Suisse secrets.

== Personal life ==
Lazarenko was married to his wife Tamara (born 1954) and has one son and two daughters. According to The Ukrainian Weekly; at the time of his 1998 arrest in Switzerland, Lazarenko's wife and children were living in a mansion worth US$7 million in Novato, near San Francisco. Lazarenko's son is Roman Lazarenko, born 17 April 2001.

Lazarenko is currently married to Oksana Tsykova, an attorney in Daniel Horowitz's Law Practice in the California East San Francisco Bay Area, with whom he has 3 children.

== In the media ==
=== Investigative journalism ===
Pavlo Lazarenko's activity was investigated by many Ukrainian journalists. Among them the most notable success was achieved by the following ones:

- Vadym Klymentyev, deputy editor of the Dnipropetrovsk newspaper Our City (Nashe Misto), editor in chief of Dnipropetrovsk municipal newspaper "Zoria".
- Mykola Kravchuk, editor in chief of Dnipropetrovsk newspaper Our City (Nashe Misto). In 2000 Nikolay Kravchuk, being an editor of an editorial in opposition to Lazarenko, was splashed in the face with acid by an unknown person. Then journalists accused Pavel Lazarenko of the attack.
- Borys Filatov, journalist, lawyer, author and host of the television program "The provincial chronicles", which went on air of Dnipropetrovsk 9th channel; in 2010 the TV show called "The provincial forecasts" went on the air of Dnipropetrovsk regional state TV and radio company (51 channel).
- Borys Braginsky, a political journalist, first deputy chairman of the Dnipropetrovsk regional organization of the National Union of Journalists of Ukraine.
- Serhiy Leshchenko, a political journalist, deputy editor of the online publication "Ukrainian Truth"
- Serhiy Rakhmanin, editor of the Ukrainian policy department of the newspaper Mirror Weekly, a member of the All-Ukrainian commission on journalistic ethics, author and host of "No slogans" program (joint project of "Public Radio" and radio "Continent").

In 2008, according to the results of collective investigative journalism, the book "The Phenomenon of Lazarenko. Villain or Genius?" edited by Vadym Klymentyev was published. It was dedicated to the analysis of the politicians' life course.

According to the results of investigations of journalist Borys Filatov two documentaries, that revealed the essence of the charges against Mr. Lazarenko in the U.S., were filmed.

== Awards ==
Lazarenko is a recipient of the Order of Prince Yaroslav the Wise in 1995 and two orders of Saint Volodymyr from the Ukrainian Orthodox Church (Moscow Patriarchate).

== See also ==
- Politics of Ukraine

Political offices
Preceded by Yevhen Marchuk	Prime Minister of Ukraine; 1996–1997	Succeeded by Valeriy Pustovoitenko
