= Apostolove Raion =

Former subdivision of Dnipropetrovsk Oblast, Ukraine

Apostolove Raion Апостолівський район
- Raion
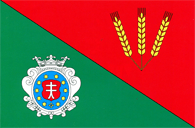
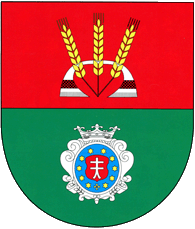
- Flag Coat of arms

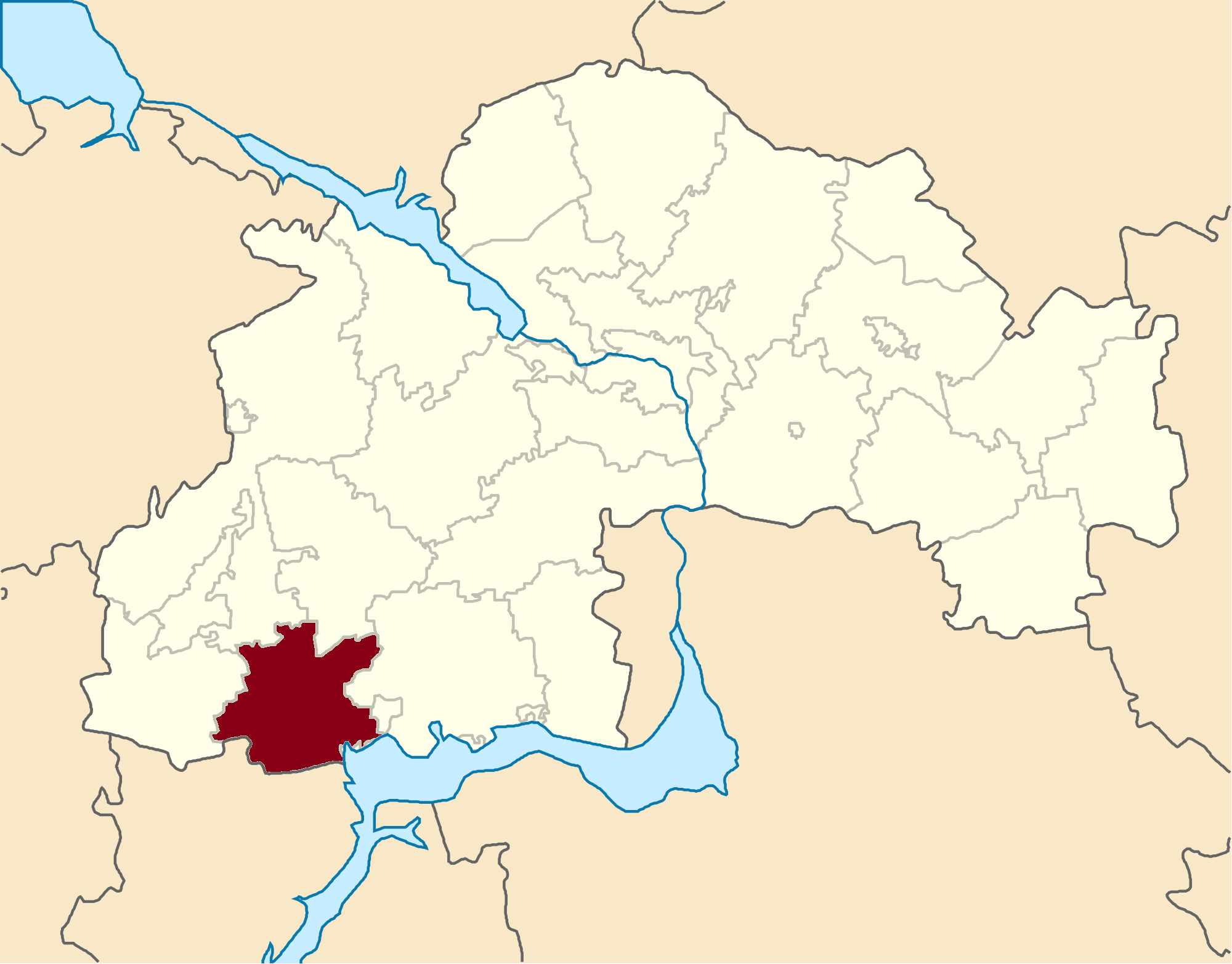
- Coordinates: 47°39′36″N 33°39′36″E
- Country: Ukraine
- Region: Dnipropetrovsk Oblast
- Disestablished: 18 July 2020
- Admin. center: Apostolove
- Subdivisions: List: — city councils; — settlement councils; — rural councils; Number of localities: — cities; — urban-type settlements; — villages; — rural settlements

Area
  - Total: 1,380 km^{2} (530 sq mi)

Population (2020)
  - Total: 52,509
  - Density: 38.0/km^{2} (98.5/sq mi)
- Time zone: UTC+02:00 (EET)
  - Summer (DST): UTC+03:00 (EEST)
- Area code: +380
- Website: http://www.apost-rn.dp.gov.ua/

Apostolove Raion (Ukrainian: Апостолівський район) was a raion (district) of Dnipropetrovsk Oblast, southeastern-central Ukraine. Its administrative centre was located at the town of Apostolove. The raion was abolished on 18 July 2020 as part of the administrative reform of Ukraine, which reduced the number of raions of Dnipropetrovsk Oblast to seven. The area of Apostolove Raion was merged into Kryvyi Rih Raion. The last estimate of the raion population was 52,509 (2020 est.).

At the time of disestablishment, the raion consisted of four hromadas:

- Apostolove urban hromada with the administration in Apostolove;
- Hrushivka rural hromada with the administration in the selo of Hrushivka;
- Nyva Trudova rural hromada with the administration in the selo of Nyva Trudova;
- Zelenodolsk urban hromada with the administration in the city of Zelenodolsk.
