= Zelenodolsk, Ukraine =

City in Dnipropetrovsk Oblast, Ukraine

Zelenodolsk Зеленодольськ
- City
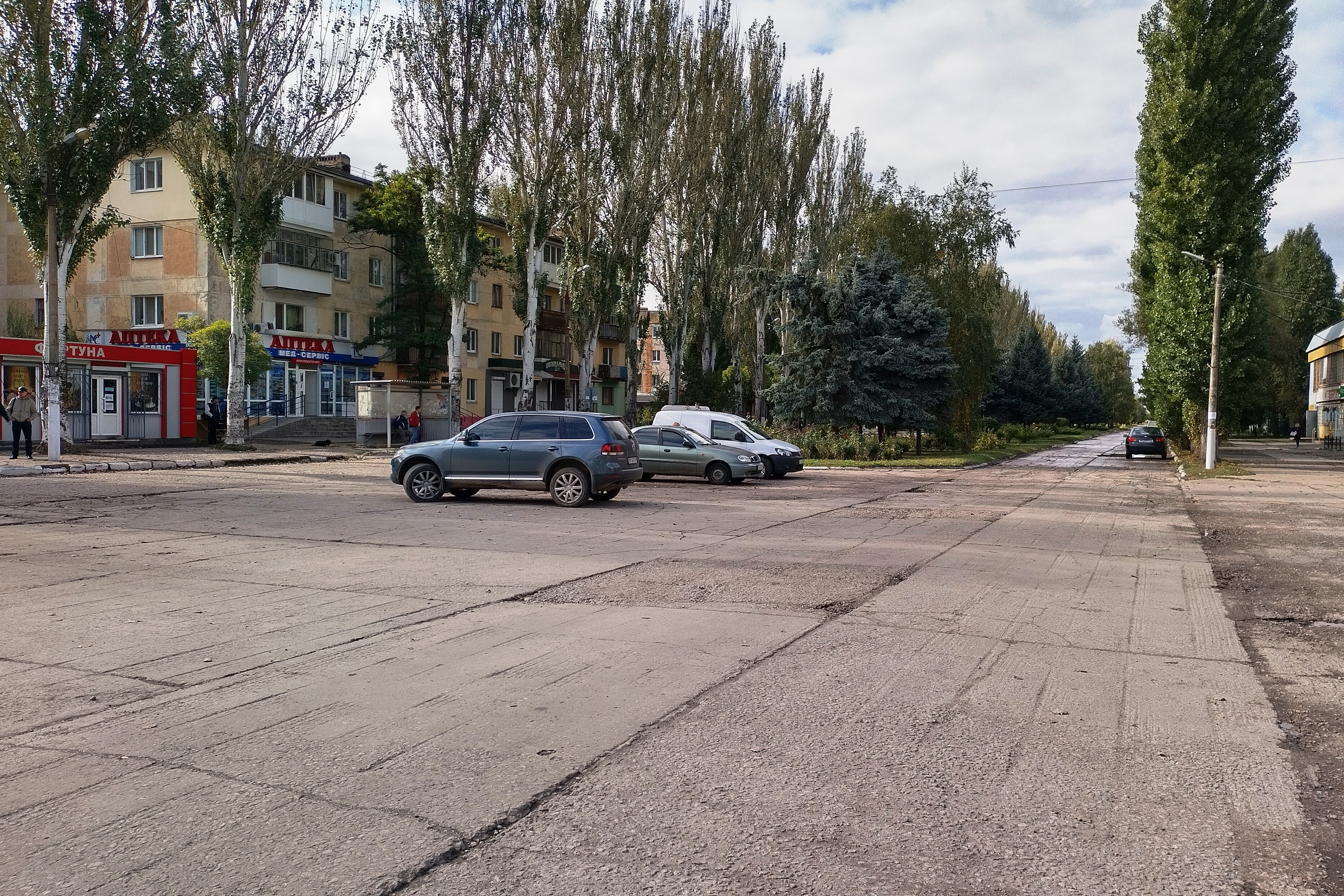
- Independence Avenue

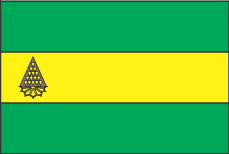
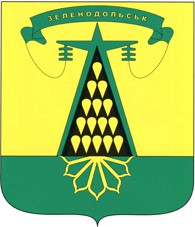
- Flag Coat of arms
- Interactive map of Zelenodolsk
- Location of Zelenodolsk Zelenodolsk (Ukraine)
- Coordinates: 47°33′57″N 33°38′47″E
- Country: Ukraine
- Oblast: Dnipropetrovsk Oblast
- Raion: Kryvyi Rih Raion
- Hromada: Zelenodolsk urban hromada
- Founded: 1961
- City rights: 1993

Population (2022)
  - Total: 12,692
- Postal code: 53860
- Area code: +380 5655

Zelenodolsk (Ukrainian: Зеленодольськ, IPA: [zeˌlɛnoˈdɔlʲsʲk]) is a city in Kryvyi Rih Raion, Dnipropetrovsk Oblast, Ukraine. It hosts the administration of Zelenodolsk urban hromada, one of the hromadas of Ukraine. As of the end of 2024, 12,000 people live in the city.

== History ==
Until 18 July 2020, Zelenodolsk belonged to Apostolove Raion. The raion was abolished in July 2020 as part of the administrative reform of Ukraine, which reduced the number of raions of Dnipropetrovsk Oblast to seven. The area of Apostolove Raion was merged into Kryvyi Rih Raion.

At the beginning of the Russian invasion of Ukraine, Zelenodolsk mayor Dmytro Neveselyi commanded a territorial defense detachment consisting of 300 local volunteers armed only with light weapons. By the evening of 24 February 2022, the unit had established checkpoints along the Zelenodolsk hromada's entire border with Kherson Oblast.

According to Neveselyi, during the first four weeks of the Russian invasion of Ukraine, there were no regular Ukrainian soldiers in the area, and the local territorial defense was the only Ukrainian force defending Zelenodolsk. The unit reportedly held a 75-kilometer front line on the Kherson Oblast-Dnipropetrovsk Oblast border, which encompassed Zelenodolsk and Marianske.

Neveselyi credits the territorial defense unit with preventing Russian forces from entering Dnipropetrovsk Oblast and capturing the Kryvyi Rih thermal power station in late February 2022.

In late March 2022, the Ukrainian military arrived in the area and pushed Russian forces deeper into Kherson Oblast.

Zelenodolsk and nearby villages experienced Russian shelling on a near-daily basis during 2022, resulting in the destruction of about 70% of the village's houses.

== Demographics ==
As of the 2001 Ukrainian census, the town counted a population of 14,986 inhabitants. In terms of ethnic backgrounds, ethnic Ukrainians constituted a large majority, followed by a significant Russian community and smaller minorities, such as Belarusians. The exact ethnic and linguistic composition of the settlement was as follows:

Ethnic groups in Zelenodolsk
	percent
Ukrainians	78.26%
Russians	19.40%
Belarusians	0.98%
Moldovans	0.21%
Tatars	0.17%
Germans	0.13%
Armenians	0.12%
others	0.73%

First languages in Zelenodolsk
	percent
Ukrainian	72.0%
Russian	27.5%
Belarusian	0.2%
Moldovan	0.1%
Armenian	0.1%
others	0.2%

== Notable people from Zelenodolsk ==
- Ruslan Dzhalilov (born 1982), Ukrainian canoeist
- Vyacheslav Sharpar (born 1987), Ukrainian footballer
