= Karpivka, Dnipropetrovsk Oblast =

Karpivka Карпівка
- Village
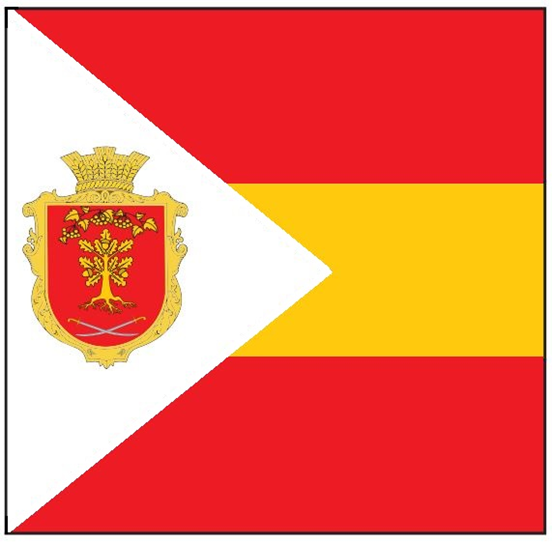

- Location of Karpivka in Dnipropetrovsk Oblast#Ukraine Karpivka (Ukraine)
- Coordinates: 47°39′57″N 33°07′14″E
- Country: Ukraine
- Oblast: Dnipropetrovsk Oblast
- Raion: Kryvyi Rih Raion
- Elevation: 95 m (312 ft)

Population (2001)
  - Total: 836
- Time zone: UTC+2 (EET)
- Postal index: 53742
- Area code: +380-5657

Karpivka (Ukrainian: Карпівка) is a village in the Kryvyi Rih Raion of Dnipropetrovsk Oblast (region), Ukraine. It hosts the administration of Karpivka rural hromada, one of the hromadas of Ukraine.

Until 18 July 2020, Karpivka belonged to Shyroke Raion. The raion was abolished in July 2020 as part of the administrative reform of Ukraine, which reduced the number of raions of Dnipropetrovsk Oblast to seven. The area of Shyroke Raion was merged into Kryvyi Rih Raion.

== Demographics ==
According to the 1989 census of the Ukrainian SSR, the population of the village was 752, of which 367 were men and 385 were women.

According to the 2001 census of Ukraine, 836 people lived in the village.

== Language ==
Distribution of the population by native language according to the 2001 census:

Language	Percentage
Ukrainian	93.40 %
Russian	4.43 %
Gagauz	0.48 %
Moldovan (Romanian)	0.48 %
Belarusian	0.24 %
Others	0.47 %

== Notable people ==
- Pavlo Lazarenko (born 1953), politician, Prime Minister of Ukraine from 1996 to 1997
