= Zaporizke, Sofiivka settlement hromada, Kryvyi Rih Raion, Dnipropetrovsk Oblast =

Zaporiz'ke Запорізьке
- Village
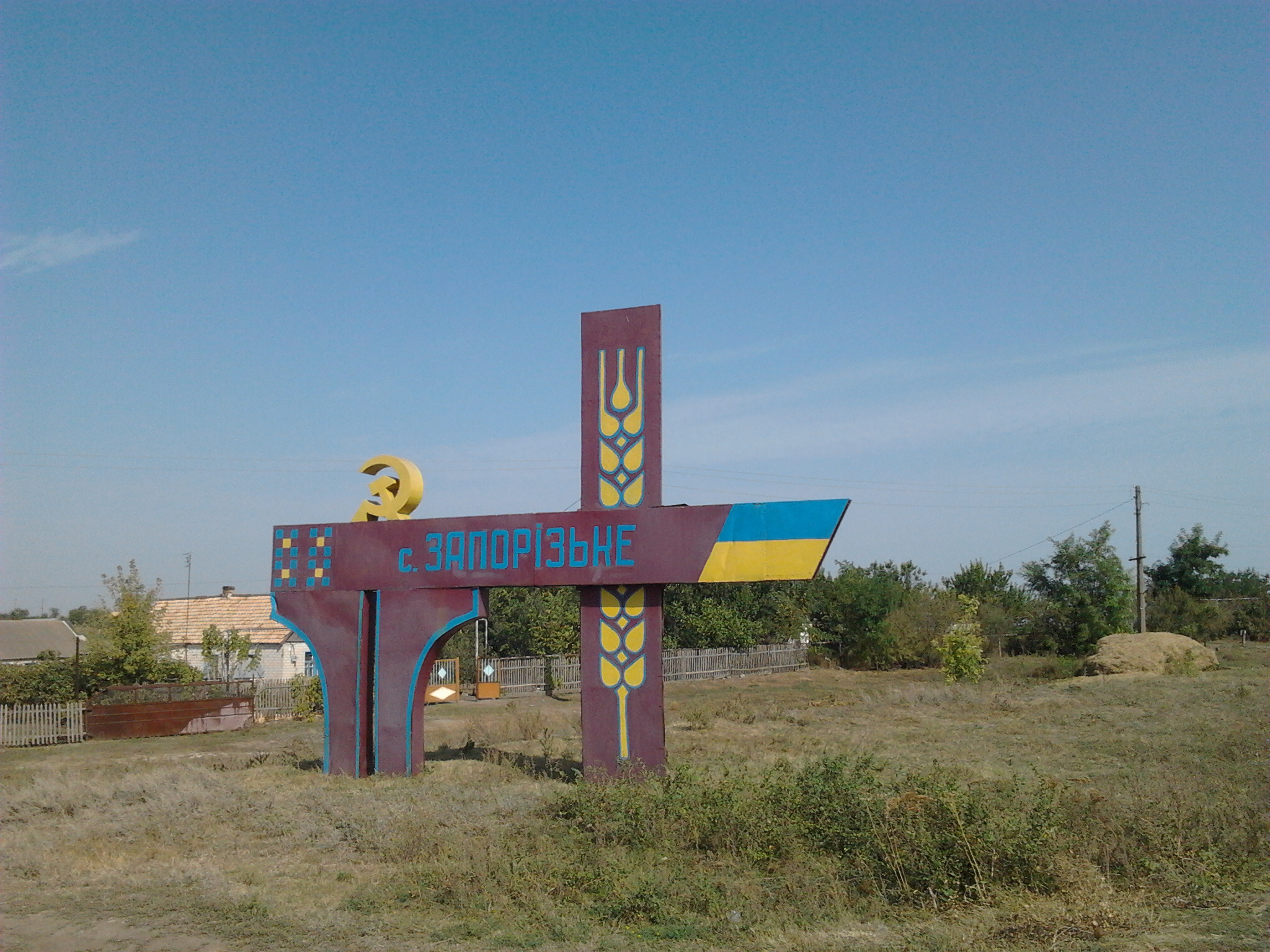

- Location of Zaporis'ke in Ukraine
- Coordinates: 48°8′3″N 33°56′5″E
- Country: Ukraine
- Oblast: Dnipropetrovsk Oblast
- Raion: Kryvyi Rih Raion
- Established: 1759
- Elevation: 121 m (397 ft)

Population (2016)
  - Total: 629
- Time zone: UTC+2 (EET)
- Postal index: 53140
- Area code: +380-5650

Zaporizke (former Vasylivka, Engelhardt-Vasylivka) is a village in Ukraine, in Kryvyi Rih Raion of Dnipropetrovsk Oblast (region). The local body is the Zaporizke village council. Zaporizke belongs to Sofiivka settlement hromada, one of the hromadas of Ukraine. The population is 629 residents.

Village Day is celebrated on the first Sunday of September.

== Geographical location ==
The village is in the south-western part of Dnipropetrovsk region, in the north of Sofiyivka area, on the Kam'yanka river. Upstream 1 kilometre (0.62 mi) is the village Brats'ke, downstream is the village Sofiyivka. The river dries up at this point and has several dams.

== Historical information ==
The village is the oldest in the Sofiyivka area and was founded in 1759 as a Cossack settlement. In 1786 a German landlord Vasil Engelhardt got six thousand acres of land along the river Kam'yanka and founded the village. At first only 17 peasants lived there. Engelhardt' son General Vasil inherited the land and built two mills (currently the farm) on the right bank of the Kam'yanka river. Later the village was named Engelhardt-Vasylivka. In 1875 a church-run school was built from clay. It had three classes and children went to school only in the winter. In 1885 General Vasil built a wooden church of Transfiguration (the garage is now on that place).

As of 1886 the village was the center of Engelhardt-Vasilyvka district, Verkhnodniprovsk uyezd, Yekaterinoslav Governorate and counted to 364 people, 114 farm yard, Orthodox Church. In the 1897 the number of inhabitants increased to 1,027 persons (519 males and 508 – female), 1026 of which – the Eastern Orthodox faith. In 1908 the number of inhabitants was 1399 persons (702 men and 697 women).

=== Historical names ===
People used to name streets and areas of the village. "Lousy (Voshiva)" – on the right side of the landlord's pond where two families began to build their houses and clang to this place like lice. On the left side of the pond, split by the dam, there were many frogs, which croaked endlessly. On this fertile ground people began to build a new street and named it "Zhabolupivka".

=== The beginning of the twentieth century ===
Most villagers were landless, with no holdings. Before the Revolution of 1917 there were about 20 wealthy families in the village who owned 25 hectares (62 acres) of land and agricultural machinery. During lean years poor people exchanged their houses (huta) for a peck or two of grain.

In 1905 year Communist emissaries came to the village from Malosofiivka with the aim of distributing leaflets. They urged villagers to smash aristocratic estates. Among those who joined these calls – S. Shcherbakov, K. Kolesnik T. Dorozhon. The village head Pylypenko made a list of rebels and sent it to Sofiivka for an officer Burilov. Soon gendarmes arrived in the village. But the residents of Engelhardt-Vasylivka with spading forks in their hands surrounded the gendarmes and tore the list. Then the Police came to the aid with hundreds of Russian Cossacks. There was a tough massacre of rebellious peasants. the organizers of the rebellion were whipped with rods, Dorozhona T. and K. Kolesnik were thrown into prison.

=== The Soviet prewar period ===
In December 1917, the Council of Peasants' Deputies was elected in the village, which included I. I. Garkusha, Z. T. Babenko, S. M. Kolisnyk, G. S. Pylypenko and others. In early February 1918 John G. Babenko, Grigory Garkusha, Stephen N. Pylypenko, Stephen Mynovych Didushov, Gregory Pavlovich Kolesnik and Dmitri Lavrent'evich Myntus joined the Red Army.

In March 1918 German Empire troops came to the village and committed a brutal massacre of activists. Ten people were sentenced to death. During the Soviet-Ukrainian war of 1917–1921. Engelhardt-Vasylivka passed from time to time under the authority of the RIA of Ukraine headed by Nestor Makhno, the Volunteer Army of the Russian Empire and others up to the summer of 1918 when the Red detachments came to, Enhelhardt- Vasylivka and established the Soviet regime there. Harkusha Ivan Ivanovich and Demchenko Gregory Yevmenovych were elected as delegates to Katerynoslav First Ukrainian Congress (Congress of Ukrainian provincial council, as it is called), held on 21–22 May 1917 in Katerynoslav. These local delegates brought back the regulations of the Soviet regime. Soon, the Committee of poor peasants was established in the village.

The Soviet authority was set up in 1918 Bondarenko Archip Grigorovich was chosen as the Chairman of the Village Council in 1919, later it was Mikhail Efim Kolesnik (up to 1939).

In 1924, the villagers created the first TSOz (partnership for joint cultivation of land), headed by Sergey Kolesnik.

In 1925, the Vasylivska village was included in Sofiivka Raion, Kryvyi Rih okruha of the province Katerinoslav, The Vasylivska village council consisted of the villages Vasylivka, Dovhivka, May Day, and the isolated Spokoystviye farmstead. At the time the Partnership "New Life", chaired by Harkusha Ivan Ivanovich, was first organized in the Sofiyivka Raion consisting of twelve households. It had three horses, a cook, a reaper, a thresher and three cows. Collectivization started, wealthy people were dekulakizated, The Soviet regime took away grain, livestock, tools. Each family paid prodnalog (food tax).

In 1930 the Vasylivska Village Council consisted of v. Vasylivka (the collective farm named Petrovsky) and v. Brats'ke (the collective farm named Stalin). The land was cultivated by horses and oxen, sheaves were driven on wagons, grain was threshed with Garman (hewn stone). During Holodomor 1931–1933 years the villagers for surviving had to eat mushrooms, soybeans, tonkonih, press cake, to pick up spikelets, acacia blossoms, horse dock, of which matorzhenyky (a kind of shortcake) were baked, zatirka (a soup with flour) was cooked. Members of collective farms were given 1 kg (2.2 lb) of flour per family a month and one cup of milk a day.

On the eve of the war the collective farm had six farm tractors (four – HTZ and two - CTZ) and four harvesters. A medical center was located in an ordinary village house, in which Hom'ak Vasyl Onykiyovych and Maria G. Demchenko worked as feldshers.

=== The German-Soviet war ===
The occupation of the village started at harvest time of 1941. The Germans divided the collective farm into ten (10 families) and forced people to cultivate the land, and to clear roads in summer. Boys and girls were forcibly taken to Germany, among these Katrushenko Ganna (born 1926), Kovbasa Mykola (born in 1926), Polina Rudenko V. (born in 1924), Chorniy Vasil Kirillovich (born in 1925.) Tarasenko Sophia Danylivna (born in 1925), Kovalenko Lyudmila Antonivna (born in 1923), Dudar Anna K. (born in 1920), Gatsenko Nina Sydorivna (born in 1921), Demchenko Mykola Petrovich and others. The occupation of the village lasted for more than two years. During the liberation battles, that were a month long, the part of the main street (currently Postniy street) were burned (from the house no. 137 to the end of the village in the direction of v.Brats'ke). The house of Demchenko Ivan Ivanovich and Ganna Semyoniovna was a seat of a military ambulance. The hospital was located in the school building. The villagers looked after the wounded, washed their clothes, and fed them.

On 28 November 1943 the soldiers of 195 (Novomoskovsk) and 353 (Dnieprodzerzinsk) rifle divisions liberated the village. Vasylivka. On the same day the Vasilevka village council recovered its activity. In 1944, Harkusha Ivan Ivanovich was elected as the head of the Vasilevka village council. In 1944 and 1945 respectively, the secretary of the village council was Shpoont Galina Safonivna. Later the heads of the village council were Kolesnik Dmitry Tihonovich and Tkach Ivan. The secretary of the village council executive committee was Andrew H. Pylypenko.

In 1945 all corpses from the graves around were placed in a mass grave that is now in front of the school building. Hundreds of soldiers, among them a woman who died during the bombing of her native village are buried there.

=== The Soviet post-war period ===
In 1945 year there worked a seven-year school and a two-year School of Village Youth (teachers Smiyanenko, Yastroob M.). At the village council so called "soldiers of cultural army" Smiyanenko, Artemenko, Manzyuk carried on their activity.

In 1958, the collective farm named Stalin joined that of Petrovsky. At that time, the collective farm named Petrovsky had two trucks GAZ-51 (drivers Pylypenko Mykola Okafiyovych and Kolesnik Dmitri Tihonovich), 25 oxen, 100 horses (the horse team was there where is the house 145 in Postniy street now). They took tractors from MTS. The collective farm land amounted to 3200–3500 hectares. In the period 1954–1959 the chairman of the collective farm was Ivan P. Barylchenko, awarded the Order of the Red Banner of Labor in 1958. During this time the villagers built the double and four-row cow-houses (the head of dairy farms was Dorozhon A.S), a garage, put up water pipes (before this they carried water with milkmaid's yokes from three wells). The collective farmer's working day lasted 12 hours (from 7 am to 7 pm). They worked hard on fields, farms, and corn floors. In arid 1954 farmers got 200 grams (7.1 oz) of bread for one workday unit, and in 1955 they sewed their clothes of cloak-tents. In 1956 the kolkhoz farmers passed 150 tons of apples to the State and in 1957–1958 years the collective farm named Petrovsky was one of the best to deliver the meat (pork) to the State and already had 20 hectares (49 acres) of garden area. A calf-woman Nina Sydorivna Gatsenko received the "Order of Honor". She had a group of 30 calves and carried food and water for them with buckets, cleaning calves by hand. And thanks to it the weight of the calves increased 800–1,000 g (28–35 oz) per day.

On 1 July 1958 the Vasylivska village council was included into Sofiivka Raion of Dnipropetrovsk Oblast. Over the years, they built a pig farm, a poultry farm and a sheep farm. The village was spreading, the number of tractors, combine-harvesters, machinery were increasing, the heads of the collective farm replaced each other. From 1960 the chairman of the kolkhoz was Ivan Moysa, from 1967 it was Boris T. Bershadskiy, later Bilov Ivan, from 1976 Vereshchak S. In the period from 1966 to 1972 the garage housed 40 various vehicles (garage foreman Mikhail Pilipenko). In 1970 dairy farm no. 2 expanded and a dairy complex was built; milking machines were introduced. The dairy farms no. 2 repeatedly took prizes in the district and region (headed by Kolesnik A. for 18 years). The milkmaids Anna A. Kolesnik, Shpoont Nina G., Tarasenko Sofia Danylivna achieved yields 3,000 L (660 imp gal; 790 US gal) per cow. In 1967 they built a new club, the dining room, the village council building, the post office. The village shop sold food and household goods (managed by Kolesnik Nadiya Okafiyovna).

In 1964 the village Vasylivka was renamed to the village Zaporiz'ke (supposedly in honor of the Zaporizhian Cossacks).

From 1982 to 1992 Yalovoy Grigory was managing the collective farm after Petrovsky, He made a great contribution to rural development. During his heading the villagers built 8 km pipeline, 18 km water pipeline, constructed 20 residential buildings, made major repairs to workshops, the kindergarten, the canteen and the rural club. They also set to work a power-driven floor and the first gas dryer in the area, storage for 3,000 tons of grain, enclosed the floor and laid asphalt in its territory, asphalted the tractor brigade, laid the tile road to the farm, purchased new harvesters "Don-1500" and trucks "Kamaz". All these works were carried out at the expense of the collective farm, which often won prizes in the area and region.

=== Independent Ukraine ===
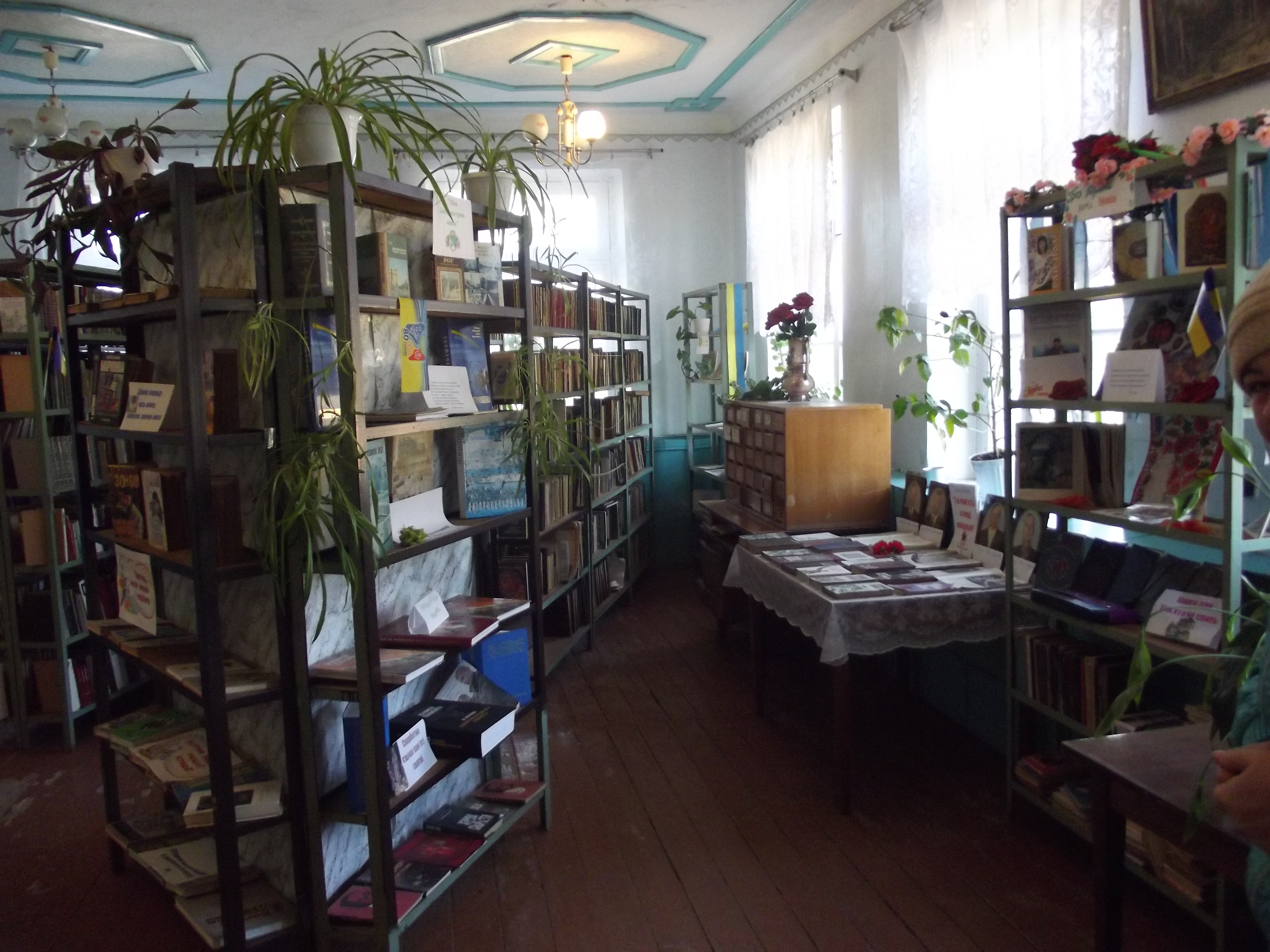
The library in the club of Zaporiz'ke

In 1992 the first private farm (SFG) "Hosanna" was created (head V. Davydenko), and in 1993, the collective farm after Petrovsky was reorganized in KSP (Collective Agricultural Enterprise) "Zaporiz'ke" (head Yaloviy G. A), and in 2000 STOV (Agricultural LTD) "Revival" and STOV "Friendship". Other private farms started their activities in 1993 – SFG "Star" (Tarasenko I.I), SFG "Omega" (Malohatko V.I), SFG "Lydia" (Brovko V.V).

From 2006 to 2015 the chairman of the village council was Lidiya Demchenko (awarded as Honorable chairman 2015 of the Dnipropetrovsk Oblast Council).

Until 18 July 2020, Zaporizke belonged to Sofiivka Raion. The raion was abolished in July 2020 as part of the administrative reform of Ukraine, which reduced the number of raions of Dnipropetrovsk Oblast to seven. The area of Sofiivka Raion was merged into Kryvyi Rih Raion.

== Notable people ==
- Bereza Roman – senior soldier of the Armed Forces of Ukraine, served in the Russian-Ukrainian war 2014–2015 years. Lost in action during the battle of Ilovaysk.
- Postniy Alexiy – the Hero of the Soviet Union.
- Andreichenko S.S – the Soviet sculptor, graduated from high school in the village Engelhardt-Vasylivka in 1934.

== Social life ==
- Zaporiz'ke secondary school І-ІІІ levels
- Health post
- Club

== Sources ==
- Zaporiz'ke
- Unofficial site of the village Zaporiz'ke
- Weather in Zaporiz'ke village
- Memories of Zaporiz'ke villagers (en)
- The rebel family of Kovalenko from Engelhardt-Vasilyevka region of Kryvyi Rih eng subs
