= Sofiivka Raion =

Former subdivision of Dnipropetrovsk Oblast, Ukraine

Sofiivka Raion Софіївський район
- Raion
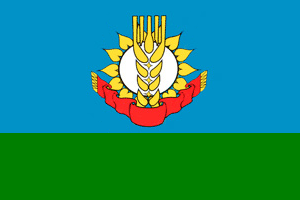
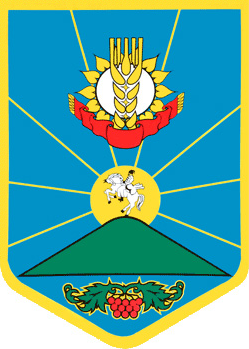
- Flag Coat of arms

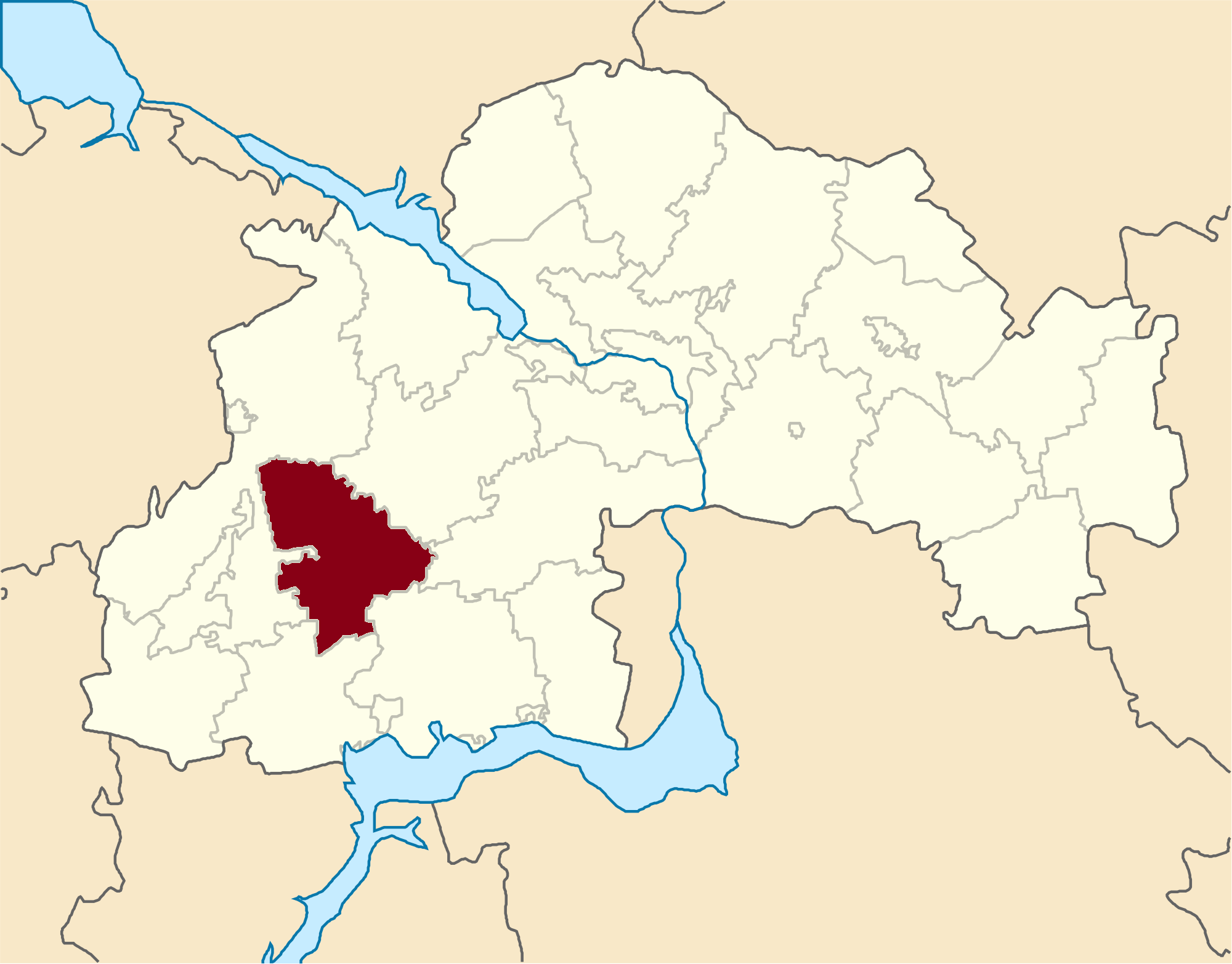
- Coordinates: 48°03′N 33°52′E
- Country: Ukraine
- Region: Dnipropetrovsk Oblast
- Disestablished: 18 July 2020
- Admin. center: Sofiivka
- Subdivisions: List: — city councils; — settlement councils; — rural councils; Number of localities: — cities; — urban-type settlements; — villages; — rural settlements

Area
  - Total: 1,379 km^{2} (532 sq mi)

Population (2020)
  - Total: 20,562
  - Density: 14.91/km^{2} (38.62/sq mi)
- Time zone: UTC+02:00 (EET)
  - Summer (DST): UTC+03:00 (EEST)
- Area code: +380

Sofiivka Raion (Ukrainian: Софіївський район) was a raion (district) of Dnipropetrovsk Oblast, southeastern-central Ukraine. Its administrative centre was located at the urban-type settlement of Sofiivka. The raion was abolished on 18 July 2020 as part of the administrative reform of Ukraine, which reduced the number of raions of Dnipropetrovsk Oblast to seven. The area of Sofiivka Raion was merged into Kryvyi Rih Raion. The last estimate of the raion population was 20,562 (2020 est.).

At the time of disestablishment, the raion consisted of three hromadas:

- Devladove rural hromada with the administration in the settlement of Devladove;
- Sofiivka settlement hromada with the administration in Sofiivka;
- Vakulove rural hromada with the administration in the selo of Vakulove.

Zaporizke was the oldest village in the Sofiivka Raion.
