= Shyroke =

Rural locality in Dnipropetrovsk Oblast, Ukraine

Shyroke Широке
- Rural settlement
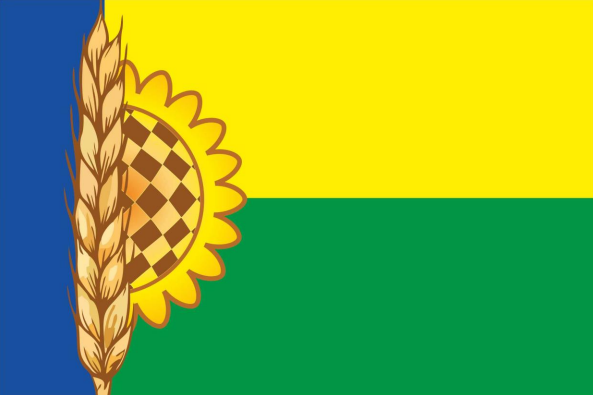
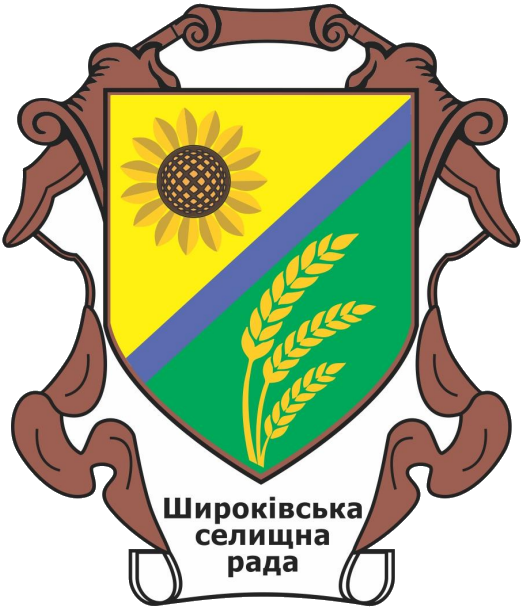
- Flag Seal

- Location within Ukraine
- Coordinates: 47°41′4″N 33°16′22″E
- Country: Ukraine
- Oblast: Dnipropetrovsk Oblast
- Raion: Kryvyi Rih Raion

Population (2022)
  - Total: 9,623
- Time zone: UTC+2 (EET)
  - Summer (DST): UTC+3 (EEST)

Shyróke (Ukrainian: Широке; Russian: Широкое) is a rural settlement in Kryvyi Rih Raion, Dnipropetrovsk Oblast, southern Ukraine. It hosts the administration of Shyroke settlement hromada, one of the hromadas (communities) of Ukraine. Population: 9,623 (2022 estimate).

Shyroke is located on the left bank of the Inhulets, several kilometers east and south of the city of Kryvyi Rih.

== History ==
Until 18 July 2020, Shyroke was the administrative center of Shyroke Raion. The raion was abolished in July 2020 as part of the administrative reform of Ukraine, which reduced the number of raions of Dnipropetrovsk Oblast to seven. The area of Shyroke Raion was merged into Kryvyi Rih Raion.

On 3 September 2022, during the Russian invasion of Ukraine, the settlement came under fire, with several houses destroyed.

Until 26 January 2024, Shyroke was designated urban-type settlement. On this day, a new law entered into force which abolished this status, and Shyroke became a rural settlement.

== Economy ==
=== Transportation ===
Shyroke is connected by a road with Kryvyi Rih. It also has access to the highway connecting Kropyvnytskyi and Zaporizhia via Kryvyi Rih and Nikopol.
