= Zelenodolsk urban hromada =

Zelenodolsk urban hromada Зеленодольська міська громада
- Hromada
- Interactive map of Zelenodolsk urban hromada
- Country: Ukraine
- Oblast: Dnipropetrovsk Oblast
- Raion: Kryvyi Rih Raion
- Admin. center: Zelenodolsk

Area
  - Total: 311.9 km^{2} (120.4 sq mi)

Population (2018)
  - Total: 19,485
  - Density: 62.47/km^{2} (161.8/sq mi)
- CATOTTG code: UA12060130000012028
- Settlements: 4
- Cities: 1
- Villages: 3

Zelenodolsk urban territorial hromada (Ukrainian: Зеленодольська міська територіальна громада, romanized: Zelenodolska miska terytorialna hromada) is one of the hromadas of Ukraine, located in Kryvyi Rih Raion within Dnipropetrovsk Oblast. The administrative center is the city of Zelenodolsk.

The hromada has an area of 311.9 km^{2} (120.4 mi^{2}), as well as a population of 19,485 (2018).

It was formed on July 30, 2015, by merging the Zelenodolsk City Council and the Velyka Kostromka and Marianske village councils of the Apostolove Raion.

== Composition ==
In addition to one city (Zelenodolsk), the hromada contains 3 villages:

- Mala Dolyna
- Marianske
- Velyka Dolyna
