= Shyroke Raion =

Former subdivision of Dnipropetrovsk Oblast, Ukraine

Shyroke Raion Широківський район
- Raion
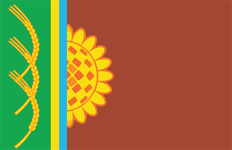
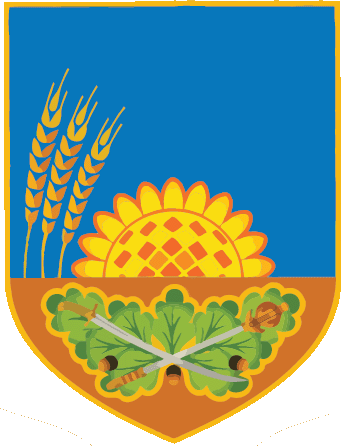
- Flag Coat of arms

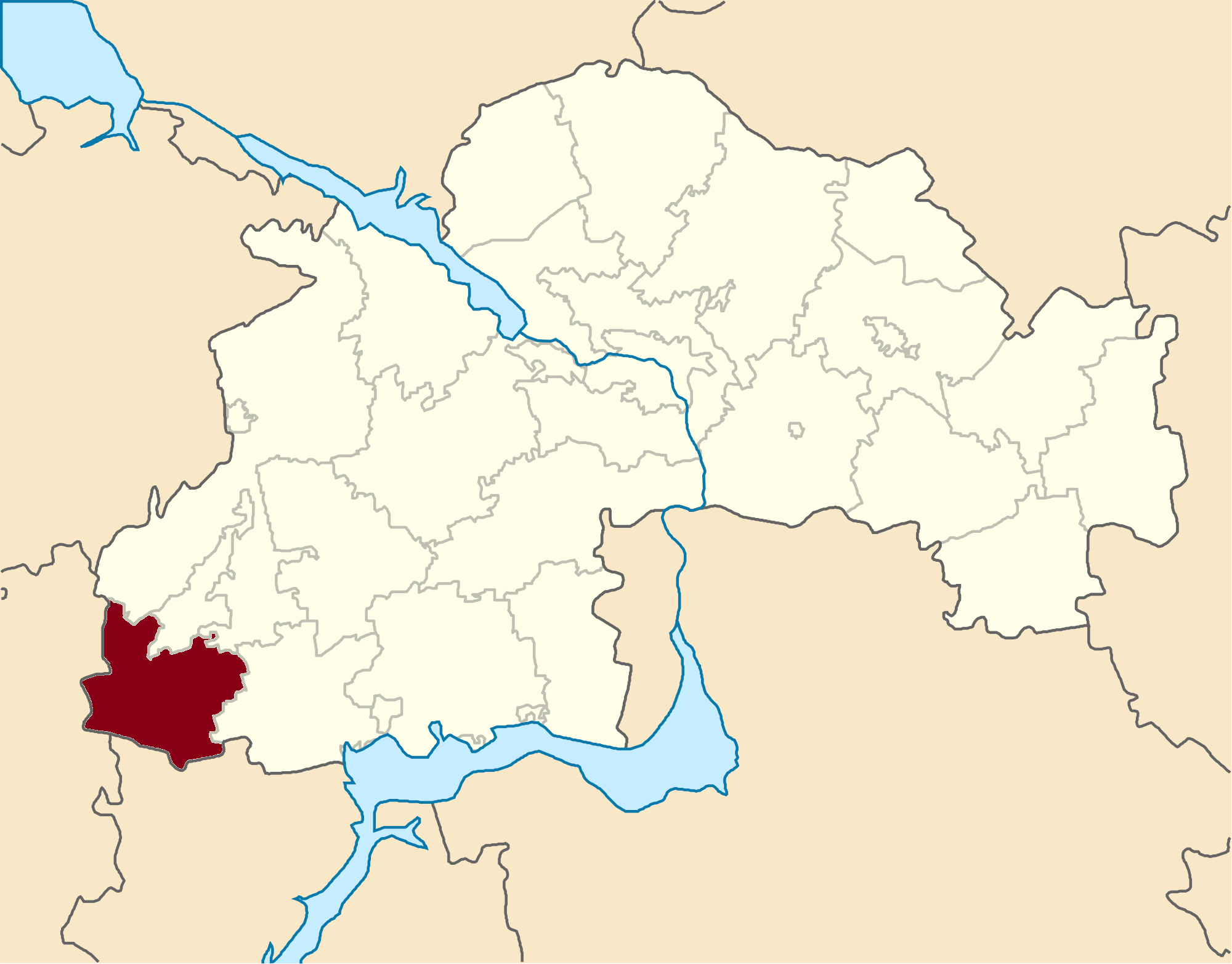
- Coordinates: 47°41′8″N 33°11′10″E
- Country: Ukraine
- Region: Dnipropetrovsk Oblast
- Disestablished: 18 July 2020
- Admin. center: Shyroke
- Subdivisions: List: — city councils; — settlement councils; — rural councils; Number of localities: — cities; — urban-type settlements; — villages; — rural settlements

Area
  - Total: 1,214 km^{2} (469 sq mi)

Population (2020)
  - Total: 25,696
  - Density: 21.17/km^{2} (54.82/sq mi)
- Time zone: UTC+02:00 (EET)
  - Summer (DST): UTC+03:00 (EEST)
- Area code: +380

Shyroke Raion (Ukrainian: Широківський район) was a raion (district) of Dnipropetrovsk Oblast, southeastern-central Ukraine. Its administrative centre was located at the urban-type settlement of Shyroke. The raion was abolished on 18 July 2020 as part of the administrative reform of Ukraine, which reduced the number of raions of Dnipropetrovsk Oblast to seven. The area of Shyroke Raion was merged into Kryvyi Rih Raion. The last estimate of the raion population was 25,696 (2020 est.).

At the time of disestablishment, the raion consisted of four hromadas:

- Hrechani Pody rural hromada with the administration in the selo of Hrechani Pody;
- Karpivka rural hromada with the administration in the selo of Karpivka;
- Novolativka rural hromada with the administration in the selo of Novolativka;
- Shyroke settlement hromada with the administration in Shyroke.
