= Sofiivka, Dnipropetrovsk Oblast =

Rural locality in Dnipropetrovsk Oblast, Ukraine

Sofiivka Софіївка
- Rural settlement
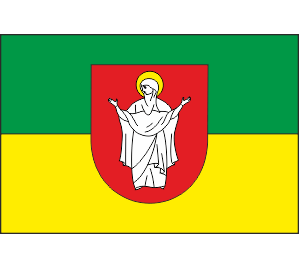
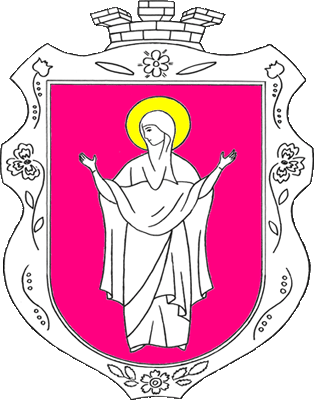
- Flag Coat of arms
- Interactive map of Sofiivka
- Location within Ukraine Location within Dnipropetrovsk Oblast
- Coordinates: 48°03′0″N 33°52′0″E
- Country: Ukraine
- Oblast: Dnipropetrovsk Oblast
- District: Kryvyi Rih District
- Metropolitan area: Kryvyi Rih Metropolitan Region

Population (2022)
  - Total: 6,329
- Time zone: UTC+2 (EET)
  - Summer (DST): UTC+3 (EEST)

Sofiivka (Ukrainian: Софіївка; Russian: Софиевка) is a rural settlement in Kryvyi Rih Raion, central Ukraine. It hosts the administration of Sofiivka settlement hromada, one of the hromadas of Ukraine. Population: 6,329 (2022 estimate).

Sofiivka is located on the banks of the Kamianka river, a right tributary of the Bazavluk in the basin of the Dnipro River.

== History ==
Until 18 July 2020, Sofiivka was the administrative center of Sofiivka District. The raion was abolished in July 2020 as part of the administrative reform of Ukraine, which reduced the number of raions of Dnipropetrovsk Oblast to seven. The area of Sofiivka Raion was merged into Kryvyi Rih Raion.

Until 26 January 2024, Sofiivka was designated urban-type settlement. On this day, a new law entered into force which abolished this status, and Sofiivka became a rural settlement.

== Economy ==
=== Transportation ===
Sofiivka is on the H11 highway which connects Dnipro and Kryvyi Rih. It also have road access to Apostolove in the south and Piatykhatky in the north.

The closest railway station is in Devladove, about 10 kilometres (6.2 mi) northwest of Sofiivka, on the railway connecting Dnipro and Kryvyi Rih.
