= Zaporizke, Nikopol Raion, Dnipropetrovsk Oblast =

Zaporizce Запорізьке
- Location of Zaporis'ke Zaporizce (Dnipropetrovsk Oblast)
- Coordinates: 47°44′08″N 34°50′48″E
- Country: Ukraine
- Oblast: Dnipropetrovsk Oblast
- Raion: Nikopol Raion
- Elevation: 100 m (330 ft)

Population (2001)
  - Total: 212
- Time zone: UTC+2 (EET)
- Postal index: 53550
- Area code: +380-5668

Zaporizke (Ukrainian: Запорізьке) is a village in Ukraine, in Nikopol Raion of Dnipropetrovsk Oblast (region). It belongs to Tomakivka settlement hromada, one of the hromadas of Ukraine.

Until 18 July 2020, Zaporizke belonged to Tomakivka Raion. The raion was abolished in July 2020 as part of the administrative reform of Ukraine, which reduced the number of raions of Dnipropetrovsk Oblast to seven. The area of Tomakivka Raion was merged into Nikopol Raion.

== Sources ==
- Weather in Zaporiz'ke village
