= Kryvyi Rih Raion =

Subdivision of Dnipropetrovsk Oblast, Ukraine

Kryvyi Rih Raion Криворізький район
- Raion
- Kryvorizkyi raion
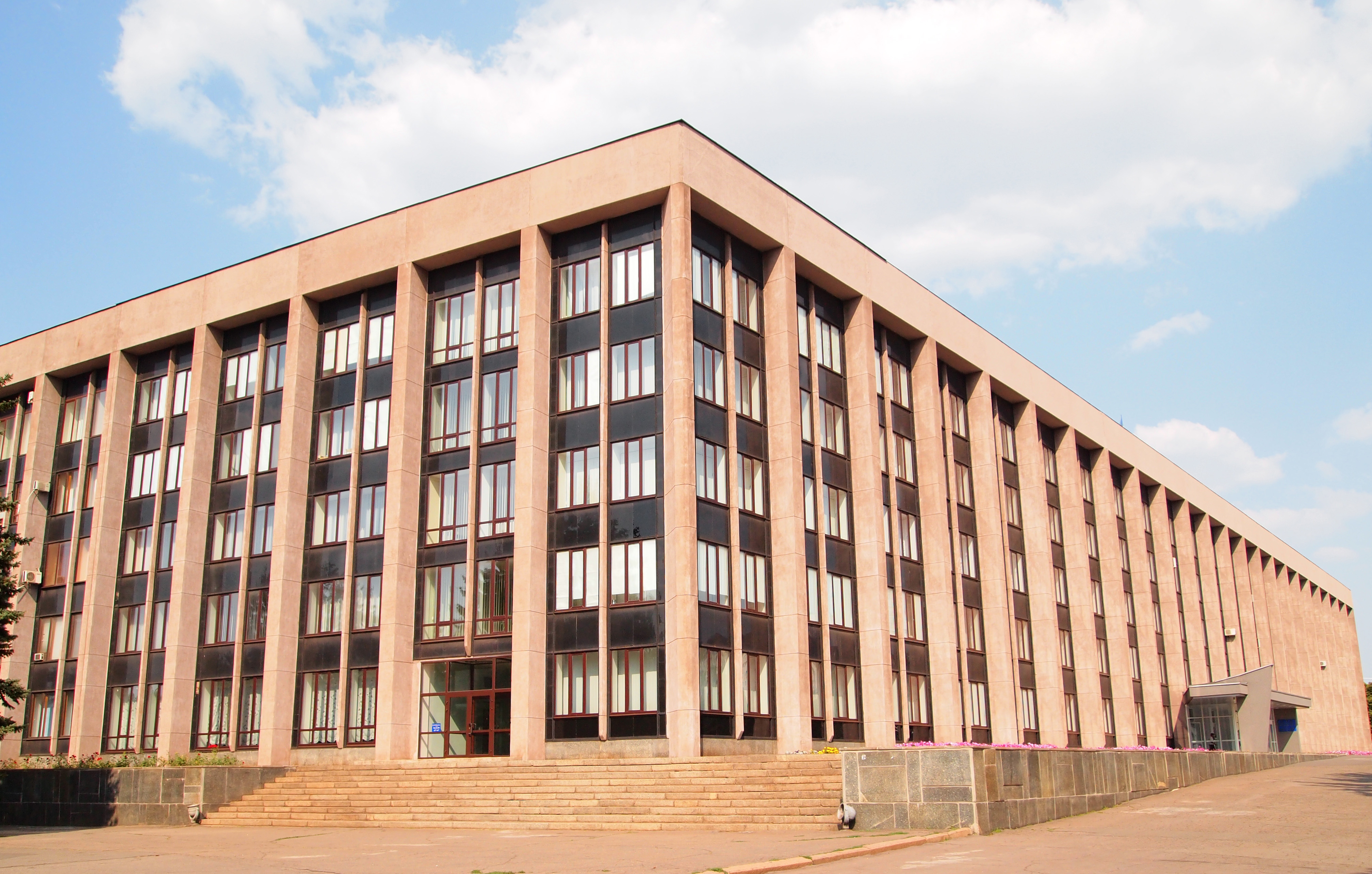

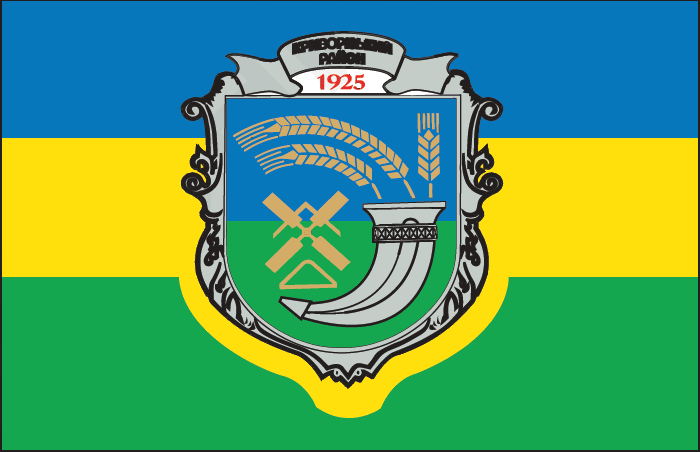
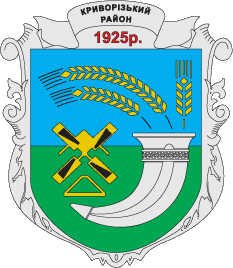
- Flag Coat of arms

- Coordinates: 47°59′49″N 32°59′58″E
- Country: Ukraine
- Oblast: Dnipropetrovsk Oblast
- Admin. center: Kryvyi Rih
- Subdivisions: 15 hromadas

Area
  - Total: 5,717.4 km^{2} (2,207.5 sq mi)

Population (2022)
  - Total: 743,934
  - Density: 130.12/km^{2} (337.00/sq mi)
- Time zone: UTC+02:00 (EET)
  - Summer (DST): UTC+03:00 (EEST)
- Area code: +38 056

Kryvyi Rih Raion (Ukrainian: Криворізький район) is a raion (district) of Dnipropetrovsk Oblast situated in central and southern Ukraine. Its administrative centre is the city of Kryvyi Rih. Population: 743,934 (2022 estimate).

On 18 July 2020, as part of the administrative reform of Ukraine, the number of raions of Dnipropetrovsk Oblast was reduced to seven, and the area of Kryvyi Rih Raion was significantly expanded. Three abolished raions, Apostolove, Shyroke, and Sofiivka Raions, as well as Kryvyi Rih Municipality, were merged into Kryvyi Rih Raion. The January 2020 estimate of the raion population was 43,807 (2020 est.).

== Subdivisions ==
=== Current ===
After the reform in July 2020, the raion consisted of 15 hromadas:

- Apostolove urban hromada with the administration in the city of Apostolove, transferred from Apostolove Raion;
- Devladove rural hromada with the administration in the settlement of Devladove, transferred from Sofiivka Raion;
- Hleiuvatka rural hromada with the administration in the selo of Hleiuvatka, retained from Kryvyi Rih Raion;
- Hrechani Pody rural hromada with the administration in the selo of Hrechani Pody, transferred from Shyroke Raion;
- Hrushivka rural hromada with the administration in the selo of Hrushivka, transferred from Apostolove Raion;
- Karpivka rural hromada with the administration in the selo of Karpivka, transferred from Shyroke Raion;
- Kryvyi Rih urban hromada with the administration in the city of Kryvyi Rih, transferred from Kryvyi Rih Municipality;
- Lozuvatka rural hromada with the administration in the selo of Lozuvatka, retained from Kryvyi Rih Raion;
- Novolativka rural hromada with the administration in the selo of Novolativka, transferred from Shyroke Raion;
- Novopillia rural hromada with the administration in the selo of Novopillia, retained from Kryvyi Rih Raion;
- Nyva Trudova rural hromada with the administration in the selo of Nyva Trudova, transferred from Apostolove Raion;
- Shyroke settlement hromada with the administration in the rural settlement of Shyroke, transferred from Shyroke Raion;
- Sofiivka settlement hromada with the administration in the rural settlement of Sofiivka, transferred from Sofiivka Raion;
- Vakulove rural hromada with the administration in the selo of Vakulove, transferred from Sofiivka Raion;
- Zelenodolsk urban hromada with the administration in the city of Zelenodolsk, transferred from Apostolove Raion.

=== Before 2020 ===
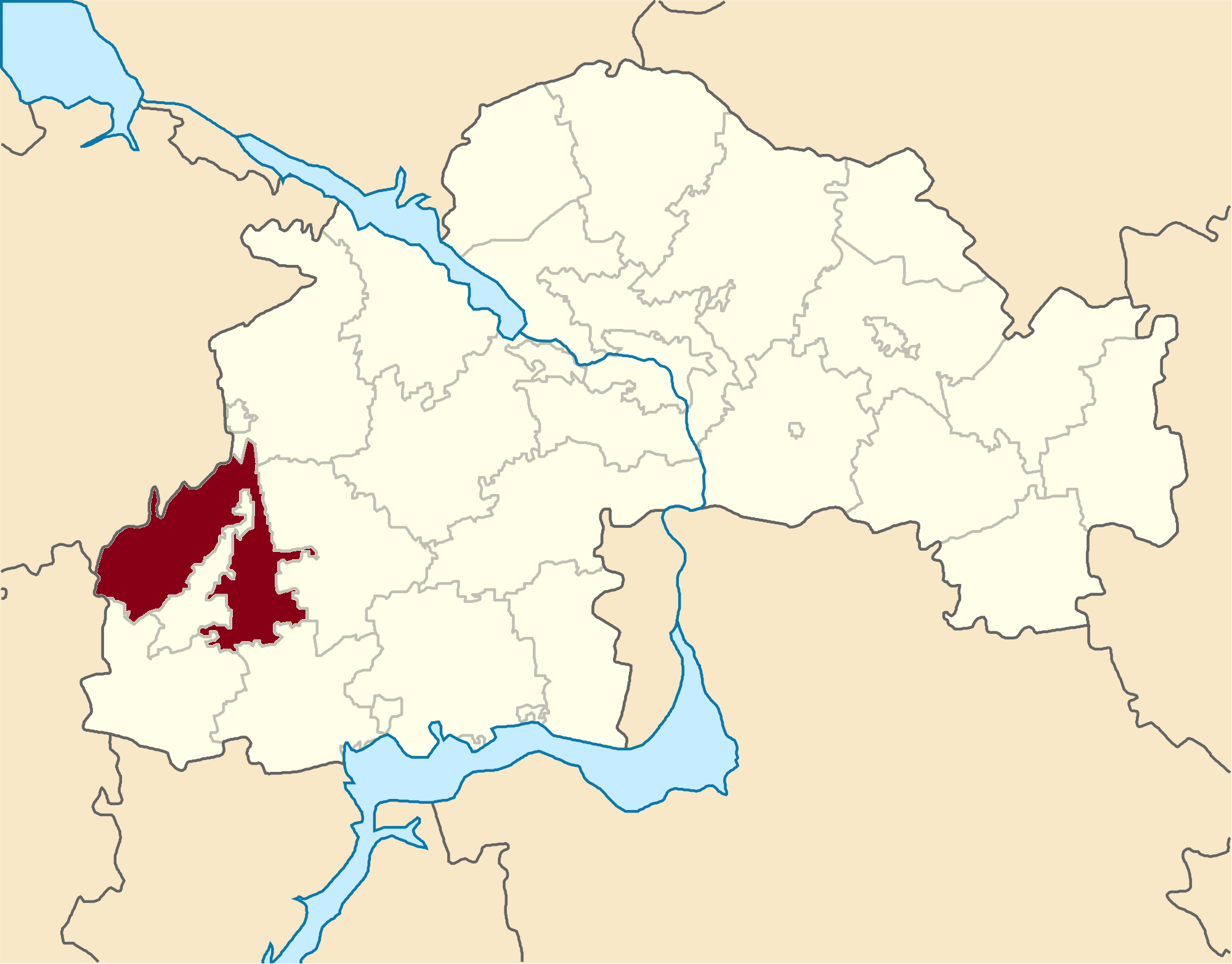
Kryvyi Rih Raion in Dnipropetrovsk Oblast before 2020

Before the 2020 reform, the raion consisted of three hromadas:

- Hleiuvatka rural hromada with the administration in Hleiuvatka;
- Lozuvatka rural hromada with the administration in Lozuvatka;
- Novopillia rural hromada with the administration in Novopillia.

== Geography ==
=== Climate ===
Kryvyi Rih experiences a dry continental climate with hot summer (Dfa) according to the Köppen climate classification system, like much of Ukraine. This tends to generate warm summers and cold winters with relatively low precipitation. Snowfalls are not common in the city, due to the urban warming effect. However, districts that surround the city receive more snow and roads leading out of the city can be closed due to snow.

Climate data for Kryvyi Rih
Month	Jan	Feb	Mar	Apr	May	Jun	Jul	Aug	Sep	Oct	Nov	Dec	Year
Record high °C (°F)	13.0 (55.4)	18.9 (66.0)	23.5 (74.3)	28.9 (84.0)	35.8 (96.4)	36.4 (97.5)	38.6 (101.5)	39.6 (103.3)	32.2 (90.0)	31.7 (89.1)	21.7 (71.1)	15.3 (59.5)	39.6 (103.3)
Mean daily maximum °C (°F)	−0.2 (31.6)	0.6 (33.1)	7.3 (45.1)	15.6 (60.1)	22.0 (71.6)	25.2 (77.4)	28.7 (83.7)	28.9 (84.0)	21.8 (71.2)	13.9 (57.0)	7.8 (46.0)	0.7 (33.3)	14.4 (57.9)
Daily mean °C (°F)	−3.5 (25.7)	−3.1 (26.4)	1.9 (35.4)	9.6 (49.3)	15.9 (60.6)	19.5 (67.1)	21.8 (71.2)	21.2 (70.2)	15.6 (60.1)	9.1 (48.4)	2.3 (36.1)	−2.1 (28.2)	9.0 (48.2)
Mean daily minimum °C (°F)	−5.5 (22.1)	−5.4 (22.3)	−0.9 (30.4)	4.3 (39.7)	10.5 (50.9)	14.1 (57.4)	16.9 (62.4)	16.3 (61.3)	11.1 (52.0)	5.2 (41.4)	1.5 (34.7)	−4.4 (24.1)	4.3 (39.7)
Record low °C (°F)	−27.2 (−17.0)	−27.3 (−17.1)	−21.0 (−5.8)	−8.9 (16.0)	−1.6 (29.1)	2.8 (37.0)	7.3 (45.1)	5.0 (41.0)	−3.7 (25.3)	−10.0 (14.0)	−18.6 (−1.5)	−24.5 (−12.1)	−27.3 (−17.1)
Average precipitation mm (inches)	30 (1.2)	29 (1.1)	24 (0.9)	28 (1.1)	45 (1.8)	62 (2.4)	58 (2.3)	32 (1.3)	38 (1.5)	37 (1.5)	31 (1.2)	28 (1.1)	442 (17.4)
Source: Pogoda.ru.net
