= Vinogradovo =

Vinogradovo (Russian: Виноградово) or Vynohradove (Ukrainian: Виноградове) is the name of several settlements in Eastern Europe:

== Russia ==
- Vinogradovo, Sheksninsky District, Vologda Oblast

== Ukraine ==
- Vynohradove, Kherson Oblast
- Vynohradove, Crimea
- Vynohradiv, a city in Zakarpattia Oblast formerly known as Vinogradovo in Russian.

== See also ==
- Vinogradov
