= Podo-Kalynivka =

Village in Kherson Oblast

Podo-Kalynivka Подо-Калинівка
- Village
- Interactive map of Podo-Kalynivka
- Location of Podo-Kalynivka within Ukraine Podo-Kalynivka (Ukraine)
- Coordinates: 46.515833°N 33.121944°E
- Country: Ukraine
- Oblast: Kherson Oblast
- Raion: Kherson Raion
- Hromada: Yuvileine rural hromada

Population (2001 census)
  - Total: 1,744
- Time zone: UTC+2 (EET)
  - Summer (DST): UTC+3 (EEST)
- Postal code: 75124
- Area code: +380 5542

Podo-Kalynivka (Ukrainian: Подо-Калинівка; Russian: Подо-Калиновка) is a village in Kherson Raion (district) in Kherson Oblast of southern Ukraine, at about 40.61 kilometres (25.23 mi) east-southeast (ESE) of the centre of Kherson city. It belongs to Yuvileine rural hromada, one of the hromadas of Ukraine.

== History ==
The village of Podo was originally founded by settlers from the village of Kozachi Laheri, and was named because of its oval-shaped depressions or lowlands. The other village, Kalynivka, was founded by settlers from Velyki Kopani, and was named after the planted viburnum that was present in nearly every yard. After the 1940s, the two villages were merged into Podo-Kalynivka. During the Soviet occupation, the village organized a collective farm called Kalinin (after Mikhail Kalinin), which later became the state farm "Banner of Communism". It cultivated 3,800 hectares of agricultural land, and specialized in grain and dairy production.

As a result of redistricting, on 17 July 2020 the village became part of the Kherson Raion. Since February 2022, during the beginning of the Russian invasion of Ukraine, the city has been temporarily occupied by Russian forces. In February 2024, the Armed Forces of Ukraine hit a concentration of Russian servicemen on a training grounds, during which about 60 Russians were killed.

The village has a large cemetery of Soviet soldiers and a monument in honor of them. In 2008, a memorial sign was created to honor the victims of the Holodomor.

== Demographics ==
As of the 2001 Ukrainian census, the settlement had 1,744 inhabitants. Their native languages were 95.20% Ukrainian, 4.35% Russian, 0.11% Belarusian and "Moldovan" (Romanian), and 0.06% Polish.
