= Nova Maiachka =

Rural locality in Kherson Oblast, Ukraine

Nova Maiachka Нова Маячка
- Rural settlement
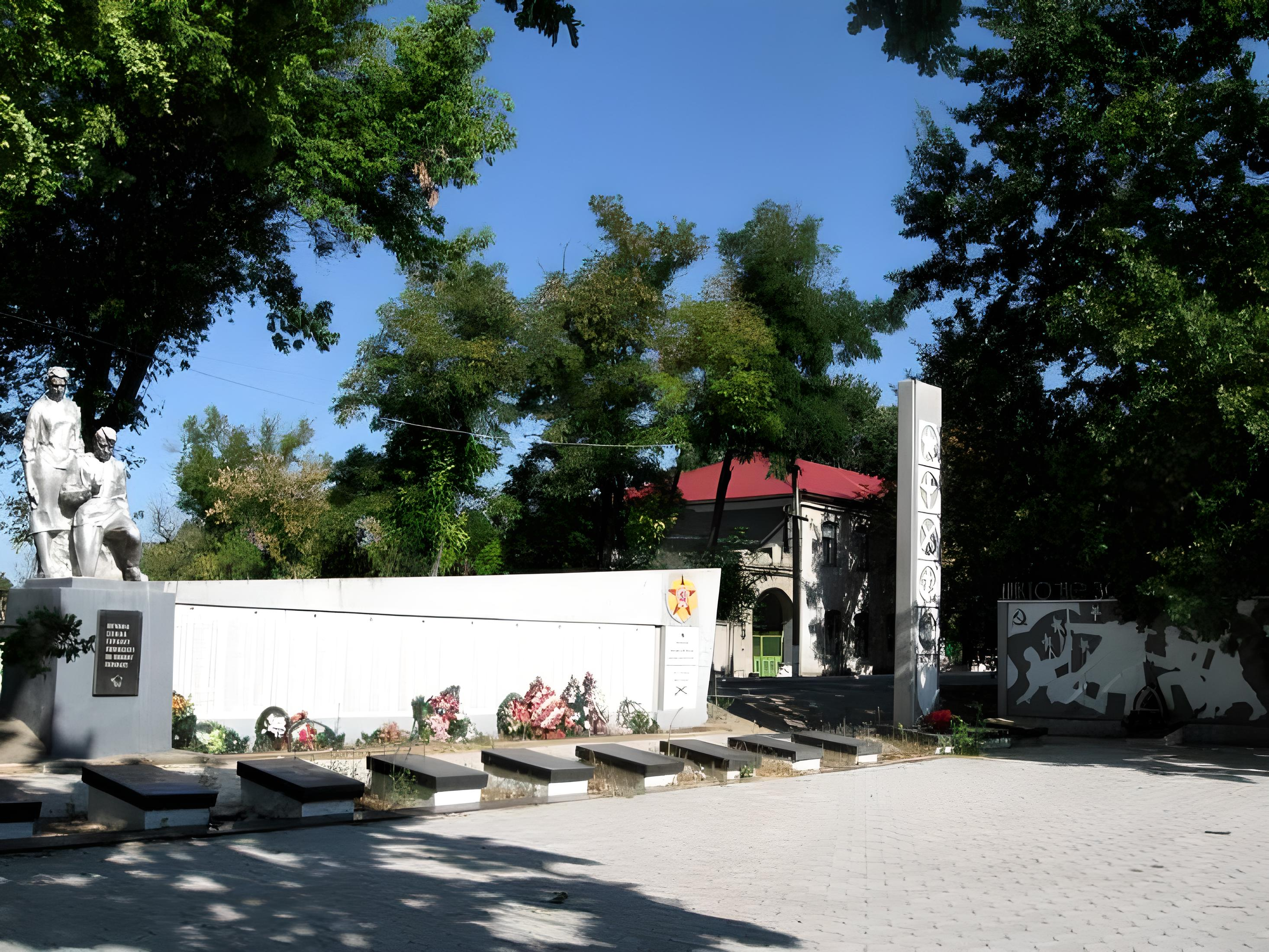
- Nova Maiachka

- Location in Kherson Oblast Location in Ukraine
- Country: Ukraine
- Oblast: Kherson Oblast
- Raion: Kherson Raion
- Hromada: Yuvileine rural hromada

Area
  - Total: 14.219 km^{2} (5.490 sq mi)

Population (2022)
  - Total: 6,585 ▼
  - Density: 463.1/km^{2} (1,199/sq mi)
- Time zone: UTC+2 (EET)
  - Summer (DST): UTC+3 (EEST)

Nova Maiachka (Ukrainian: Нова Маячка [noˈwɑ mɐˈjɑtʃkɐ]; Russian: Новая Маячка, romanized: Novaya Mayachka) is a rural settlement in Kherson Raion, Kherson Oblast, southern Ukraine. It is located approximately 30 kilometres (19 mi) east of the city of Kherson, next to Oleshky Sands. Nova Maiachka belongs to Yuvileine rural hromada, one of the hromadas of Ukraine. It has a population of 6,585 (2022 estimate).

== History ==
Until 18 July 2020, Nova Maiachka belonged to Oleshky Raion. The raion was abolished in July 2020 as part of the administrative reform of Ukraine, which reduced the number of raions of Kherson Oblast to five. The area of Oleshky Raion was merged into Kherson Raion.

Until 26 January 2024, Nova Maiachka was designated urban-type settlement. On this day, a new law entered into force which abolished this status, and Nova Maiachka became a rural settlement.

== Economy ==
=== Transportation ===
The settlement has access to Highway M14, connecting Kherson with Mariupol via Melitopol.

== See also ==
- Russian occupation of Kherson Oblast
