= 2025 Khorly strike =

Attack in Ukraine

- Part of the Russo-Ukrainian war (2022–present)
- Impact of the Hotel strike
- Location: Khorly, Ukraine; 46°04′42″N 33°17′19″E
- Target: Hotel and cafe in Khorly, Ukraine
- Date: 31 December 2025 – 1 January 2026
- Executed by: Ukraine (accused by Russia)
- Casualties: 29 (including 2 children) killed 31 (including 5 children) injured
- Location within Ukraine

On the night of 31 December 2025 to 1 January 2026, a drone strike killed 29 people at a hotel and restaurant in Khorly, Kherson Oblast, Ukraine. The strike took place in Russian-occupied territory during the Russo-Ukrainian war (2022–present).

== Background ==
At the beginning of 2022, during the 2022 Russian invasion of Ukraine, the village of Khorly in the Kalanchak settlement hromada of Skadovsk Raion, Kherson Oblast, Ukraine, was occupied by Russia.

== Events ==
A fire caused by a drone strike

According to statements by Vladimir Saldo, head of the Russian-installed administration of Kherson Oblast, the strike on a hotel and cafe in the village of Khorly was carried out by the Ukrainian side on the night of 31 December 2025, to 1 January 2026, using three UAVs.

The "Ukrayinska Khata" restaurant was attacked, where, according to Saldo, a New Year's celebration was underway. Published footage shows the near-total destruction of the restaurant, as well as damage to the "Leo" hotel. According to Saldo, the first attack occurred a few minutes before midnight, with more than 100 people inside the restaurant at the time. Two more strikes followed on the restaurant, one of which involved a UAV carrying an incendiary charge. A fire broke out, trapping guests inside the premises. According to the Russian side, Ukrainian drones hovered over the attack site afterward, preventing emergency services from reaching the scene.

According to information from former Verkhovna Rada deputy Oleg Tsaryov, obtained from eyewitnesses, the third strike caused the restaurant to catch fire, and the blaze was extinguished only by morning. According to Vladimir Saldo, the people gathered at the restaurant on New Year's night had no connection to military activities. Ukrainian sources reported that Russian military personnel and occupation administration staff were celebrating at the restaurant with their families. Oleg Tsaryov suggested that military personnel might have been among the restaurant's guests, given its location in a frontline area.

According to the Russian Investigative Committee, 29 people were killed in the strikes (including two children), with 31 people, including five children, hospitalized. By 2 January Russian authorities had published the names of 12 people killed in the strike, at least three of whom were linked to the Russian occupation administration. Referring to Ukrainian sources and Telegram channels, the BBC reported that among the dead were a former head of a Russian Interior Ministry department in occupied Kalanchak, 16 km from Khorly; the head of the information technology department of the Kalanchak occupation administration; a former employee of the occupation election commission in occupied Crimea; and an employee of the Kalanchak occupation administration department. The cafe and hotel owner was also killed; reports stated she "began cooperating with Russian occupation authorities in 2023". One Russian military correspondent claimed that a Serbian citizen was injured in the Khorly explosion; Serbian mercenaries fight Ukraine on Russia's side.

According to the Russian Ministry of Foreign Affairs, 50 people were injured.

Vladimir Saldo also published photos showing a large number of bodies under the debris. The Moscow Times geolocated images published by Saldo, confirming they were taken near the "Ukrayinska Khata" restaurant and "Leo" hotel in Khorly. An anonymous Ukrainian source told AFP that the strike targeted a gathering of military personnel that was closed to civilians.

== Reactions ==
=== Russia ===
The Russian Ministry of Defense accused Ukraine of carrying out a terrorist act. The Russian Investigative Committee opened a criminal case in connection with the incident.

=== Ukraine ===
On 2 January 2026, Ukraine's General Staff denied any involvement by the Armed Forces of Ukraine in the Khorly strikes.

== See also ==
- 2024 Lysychansk missile strike
- 3 May 2023 Kherson strike
- Makiivka military quarters shelling
- Battle of Kherson
