= Brylivka, Kherson Oblast =

Rural locality in Kherson Oblast, Ukraine

Brylivka Брилівка
- Rural settlement
- Interactive map of Brylivka
- Location in Kherson Oblast Location in Ukraine
- Country: Ukraine
- Oblast: Kherson Oblast
- Raion: Kherson Raion
- Hromada: Vynohradove rural hromada

Population (2022)
  - Total: ▼4,130
- Time zone: UTC+2 (EET)
  - Summer (DST): UTC+3 (EEST)

Brylivka (Ukrainian: Брилівка; Russian: Брилёвка) is a rural settlement in Kherson Raion, Kherson Oblast, southern Ukraine. It is located in the steppe about 50 kilometres (31 mi) southeast of Kherson and 30 kilometres (19 mi) north of the Black Sea coast. Brylivka belongs to Vynohradove rural hromada, one of the hromadas of Ukraine. It has a population of 4,130 (2022 estimate).

== History ==
Until 18 July 2020, Brylivka belonged to Oleshky Raion. The raion was abolished in July 2020 as part of the administrative reform of Ukraine, which reduced the number of raions of Kherson Oblast to five. The area of Oleshky Raion was merged into Kherson Raion.

Until 26 January 2024, Brylivka was designated urban-type settlement. On this day, a new law entered into force which abolished this status, and Brylivka became a rural settlement.

== Economy ==
=== Transportation ===
Brylivka railway station is on the railway which used to connect Kherson with Dzhankoi; however, after the Russian annexation of Crimea in 2014, the trains only run as far as Vadym, close to the border with Crimea. There is infrequent passenger traffic.

On 30 July 2022, the Ukrainian army claimed that it struck a Russian train in Brylivka.

The settlement has access to Highway M17 which runs northwest to Kherson and southeast to the border with Crimea.

== See also ==
- Russian occupation of Kherson Oblast
