= Konstantin Basyuk =

Russian politician (born 1966)

- Константин Басюк
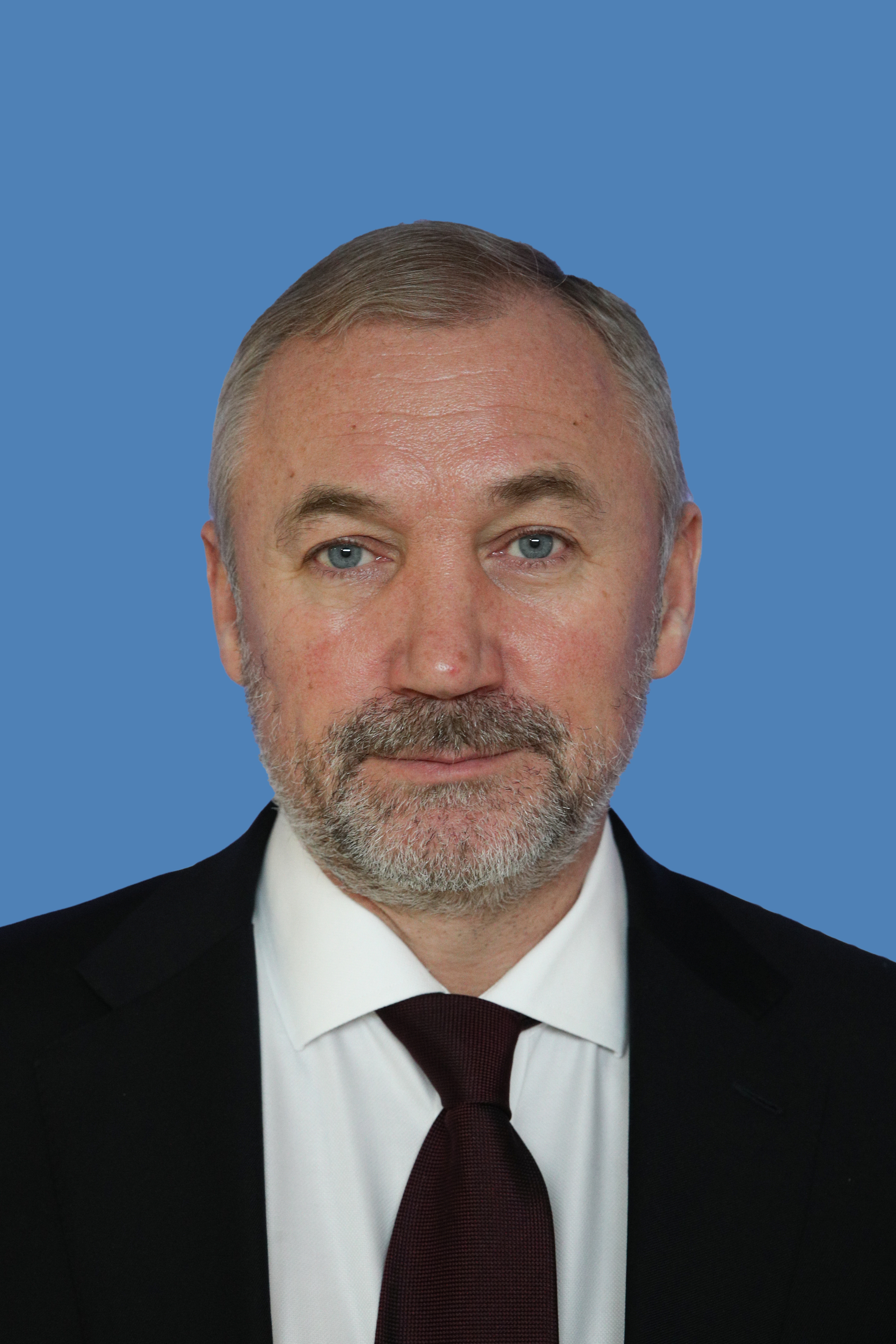

Russian Federation Senator from Kherson Oblast
- Incumbent
- Assumed office 20 December 2022
- Preceded by: seat established

Personal details
- Born: Konstantin Vladimirovich Basyuk; 29 May 1966 (age 60) Taldy-Kurgan, Kazakh SSR, Soviet Union (now Kazakhstan)

Konstantin Vladimirovich Basyuk (Russian: Константин Владимирович Басюк; born on 29 May 1966) is a Russian businessman and politician, who serves as Russian Federation Senator from Kherson Oblast since 2022.

He is the first Senator from the region, which was annexed from Ukraine after the 2022 invasion.

== Biography ==
Konstantin Basyuk was born on 29 May 1966 in Taldy-Kurgan, Kazakh SSR, Soviet Union.

In 1987, he graduated from the F. E. Dzerzhinsky Higher Border School of the KGB. In 1988, he graduated from the Higher School of the KGB. He then served in Soviet (and later Russian) state security structures, including the Ministry of Security, the Federal Counterintelligence Service and the Federal Security Service (the successor to the KGB).

In 1998, he moved to the private sector. From September to October, he was an advisor to the president of Alliance Group OJSC, before stepping down to assume the directorship of the Department for Relations with State and Public Organizations of Alliance Group OJSC, a position he held until December 2001. He was subsequently promoted, becoming Vice President of Alliance Group OJSC. In December 2004, he became the President of CJSC ALLIANCE-PROM.

Basyuk has worked in the field of civil aviation since 2005, and is the chairman of the board of directors of Khabarovsk Airport JSC, the president of Komaks Management Company LLC, is a member of the board of directors of Vladivostok International Airport JSC.

Basyuk entered politics during the 2022 Russian invasion of Ukraine, becoming an advisor to the Head of Russian occupation authorities in the Kherson Oblast, Vladimir Saldo.

In December 2022, shortly after Russia annexed Kherson Oblast, a move condemned by the United Nations as illegal, Basyuk was appointed as the region's representative in the Federation Council by now-Governor Saldo. He was sanctioned by the European Union for taking up the role. A second representative will be chosen by the new regional legislature after country-wide regional elections in September 2023.
