= Abrykosivka, Kherson Oblast =

Rural settlement in Kherson Oblast, Ukraine

Abrykosivka Абрикосівка
- Rural settlement
- Interactive map of Abrykosivka
- Location of Abrykosivka within Ukraine Abrykosivka (Ukraine)
- Coordinates: 46.488056°N 33.071111°E
- Country: Ukraine
- Oblast: Kherson Oblast
- Raion: Kherson Raion
- Hromada: Velyki Kopani rural hromada
- Founded: 1928

Area
  - Total: 42.661 km^{2} (16.472 sq mi)
- Elevation: 18 m (59 ft)

Population (2001 census)
  - Total: 1,204
  - Density: 28.22/km^{2} (73.10/sq mi)
- Time zone: UTC+2 (EET)
  - Summer (DST): UTC+3 (EEST)
- Postal code: 75134
- Area code: +380 5542

Abrykosivka (Ukrainian: Абрикосівка; Russian: Абрикосовка) is a rural settlement in Kherson Raion, Kherson Oblast, southern Ukraine, located 38.67 kilometres (24.03 mi) southeast by east (SEbE) of the centre of Kherson city. It belongs to Velyki Kopani rural hromada, one of the hromadas of Ukraine.

== History ==
The village was founded in the 1890s as a hamlet. In 1929, the Kherson Cannery opened a farm in the village for planting apricot orchards, and the area was referred to as "kombinat" (industrial complex), then it was named after the collective farm of Frunze of the nearby village of Velyki Kopani. On 24 September 1965, the local division of the farm was split to make an independent village and collective farm called Raduzhnyi, and the village was officially called Abrykosivka (due to the prior Kheran Cannery).

In March 2023, during the Russo-Ukrainian War, members of the Atesh underground resistance blew up sections of the railway that connected Abrykosivka and Radensk. According to the group, the purpose was to prevent the Russians from receiving supplies, and the supply line was cut this way. As of April 2025, the village remains occupied by Russian forces.

== Demographics ==
According to the 2001 Ukrainian Census, the only official census taken in post-independence Ukraine, the population of the village was 1,204 people. Of the people residing in the village, their mother tongue is as follows:

Language	Percentage of Population
Ukrainian	87.79%
Russian	11.79%
Other	0.42%

== Monuments ==
There is a monument located in the village honoring the residents who died during the Great Patriotic War. There also used to be a monument dedicated to Vladimir Lenin, but it was dismantled in 2015 under Ukraine's decommunization law. However, it was restored in 2025 by so-called "activists" according to Russian media.
