= Khorly =

Resort village in Kalanchak Raion, Ukraine

Coordinates: 46°04′48″N 33°17′44″E

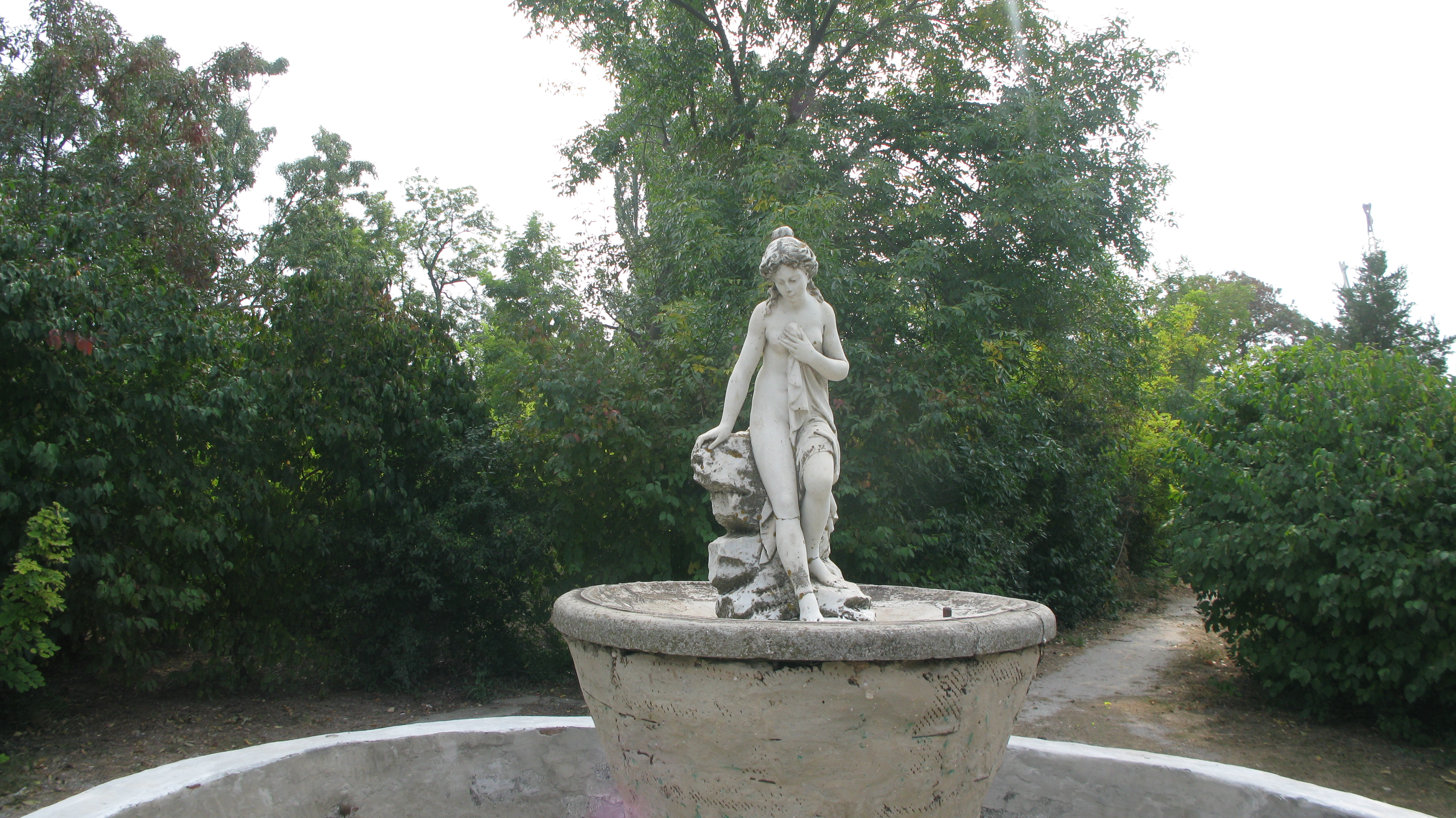
Decorative sculpture “Bathing Woman” from the 18th century in Khorly

Khorly (Russian: Хорлы; Ukrainian: Хорли) is a resort village in the Kherson Oblast of Ukraine.

== History ==
=== Establishment ===
The village was founded by Sophia Falz-Fein, as upon becoming the widow of a landowner baron in 1890, she received a large inheritance.

In 1897 , Falz-Fein laid out a park in this place, began construction of an office with a hotel for sailors, a weather station, a post office and a telegraph office. In September 1898, a telephone line was opened connecting Khorly with Perekop, Askania-Nova, and Skadovsk.

On January 26, 2021, as a result of decentralization, Khorly became part of the Kalanchak settlement hromada.

=== War ===
On January 1, 2026, according to Svetlana Petrenko, spokeswoman of Russia’s main criminal investigation agency, the Investigative Committee, said in a statement that a Ukrainian drone strike on the Ukrainian Hata cafe and Leo hotel in Khorly, Ukraine, killed at least 27 people, including two minors. She claims that at least 100 civilians were celebrating New Year’s Eve overnight into Thursday at the resort village. A total of 31, including five minors, were hospitalized with injuries. Russian sources, namely the Russian-installed governor of Kherson Oblast, Vladimir Saldo in the occupied portions of Ukraine, also claimed a strike occurred, publishing photos on Telegram of the fire and its aftermath. This information has not been verified, and Ukraine has denied involvement. Additionally, following the drone strike on the Ukrainian Hata cafe and Leo hotel in the resort village of Khorly, Russian authorities in the region announced the death of Serhiy Bohan, the head of the occupation police in Kalanchak, Ukraine.
