= Sokolohirne =

Village in Kherson Oblast, Ukraine

Sokolohirne Сокологірне
- Village
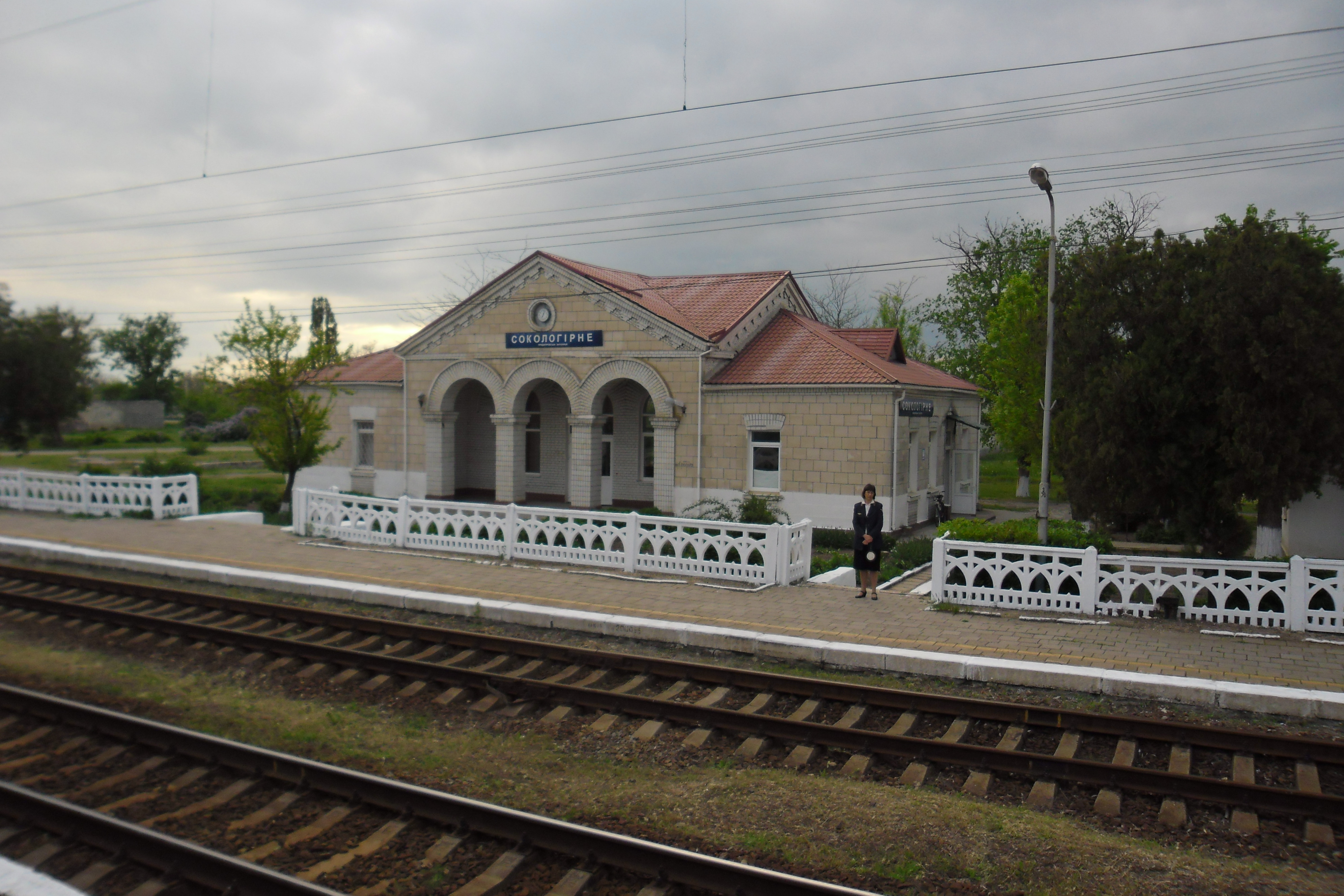
- Railway station Sokolohirne
- Interactive map of Sokolohirne
- Location of Sokolohirne in Kherson Oblast Sokolohirne (Ukraine)
- Coordinates: 46.499444°N 34.945556°E
- Country: Ukraine
- Oblast: Kherson Oblast
- Raion: Henichesk Raion
- Founded: 1874

Area
  - Total: 6.43 km^{2} (2.48 sq mi)
- Elevation: 24 m (79 ft)

Population (2001 census)
  - Total: 790
  - Density: 120/km^{2} (320/sq mi)
- Time zone: UTC+2 (EET)
  - Summer (DST): UTC+3 (EEST)
- Postal code: 75521
- Area code: +380 5534

Sokolohirne (Ukrainian: Сокологірне; Russian: Сокологорное) is a village in Henichesk Raion (district) in Kherson Oblast of southern Ukraine, at about 178.9 kilometres (111.2 mi) east by south (EbS) of the centre of Kherson city. It belongs Henichesk urban hromada, one of the hromadas of Ukraine.

== History ==
The village was officially founded in 1874. The name Sokolohirne comes from the surname of the owner of the lands on which the village was founded. After its occupation by the Soviet Union in 1918, the collective farm "Red Banner" was organized. In 1930, it was later renamed Path of Ilyich, which managed 4,00 hectares of agricultural land. During the Great Patriotic War, 420 residents of the village fought against the Germans, and after Soviet liberation from the Germans, the village was used by Soviet intelligence agents utilizing radio transmitters to collect and transmit information.

On 14 June 2020 the village became part of the Henichesk Raion under Order No. 726. However, on 17 July 2020, as a result of another administrative-territorial reform and the liquidation of the Henichesk Raion it was re-organized into the present-day Raion, which incorporated three abolished raions.

The village was captured by Russian forces in 2022, during the Russian invasion of Ukraine.

== Geography ==
The village of Sokolohirne adjoins the village of Rozivka (Melitopol district). A railway line passes through the village, the Sokolohirne station. The M18 E105 highway passes nearby.

== Demographics ==
According to the 2001 Ukrainian Census, the only official census taken in post-independence Ukraine, the population of the village was 790 people. Among the residents of the village, the distribution of the population by mother tongue according to the census is:

| Language | Percentage of Population |
|---|---|
| Ukrainian | 81.05% |
| Russian | 17.71% |
| Armenian | 0.75% |
| Moldovan | 0.12% |
| Other | 0.37% |
