= Yuvileine rural hromada =

Coordinates: 46°32′07″N 33°13′56″E

Yuvileine rural hromada Ювілейна сільська громада
- Hromada
- Interactive map of Yuvileine rural hromada
- Country: Ukraine
- Oblast: Kherson Oblast
- Raion: Kherson Raion
- Admin. center: Yuvileine
- Settlements: 8
- Rural settlements: 3
- Villages: 5

Yuvileine rural hromada (Ukrainian: Ювілейна сільська громада) is a hromada of Ukraine, in Kherson Raion, Kherson Oblast. Its administrative center is the rural-type settlement Yuvileine.

== History ==
The amalgamated hromada was formed in 2017 with the voluntary amalgamation of the Podo-Kalynivka hromada, Chaslyve hromada, and the previous Yuvileine hromada, all of which were located in the Oleshky Raion at the time of its founding. In 2018, the charter of the hromada was formally approved by the Oleshky Raion Department of Justice.

On 17 July 2020, as a result of the abolition of Oleshky Raion, the hromada was transferred to Kherson Raion. Since September 2022, by decree No. 658, the village head of the hromada was established as Serhii Petrochenko. He was established as part of a military administration after martial law was declared following the Russian invasion.

Since the start of the Russian invasion of Ukraine in February 2022, the hromada has been occupied, as it was not part of the left-bank of the Dnieper that was deoccupied during the Kherson counteroffensive.

== Settlements ==
According to the 2018 budget, the hromada had a population total of 5,824 people within an area of 324.56 km2. It received 3,542.1 thousand hryvnias as part of its allotment.

The hromada contains the urban-type settlement Nova Maiachka, two rural-type settlements (Chaslyve and Yuvileine) and five villages: Druzhne, Marchenka, Podo-Kalynivka, Pryvilne, Stara Maiachka.
