= Kalanchak =

Rural locality in Kherson Oblast, Ukraine

- Rural settlement
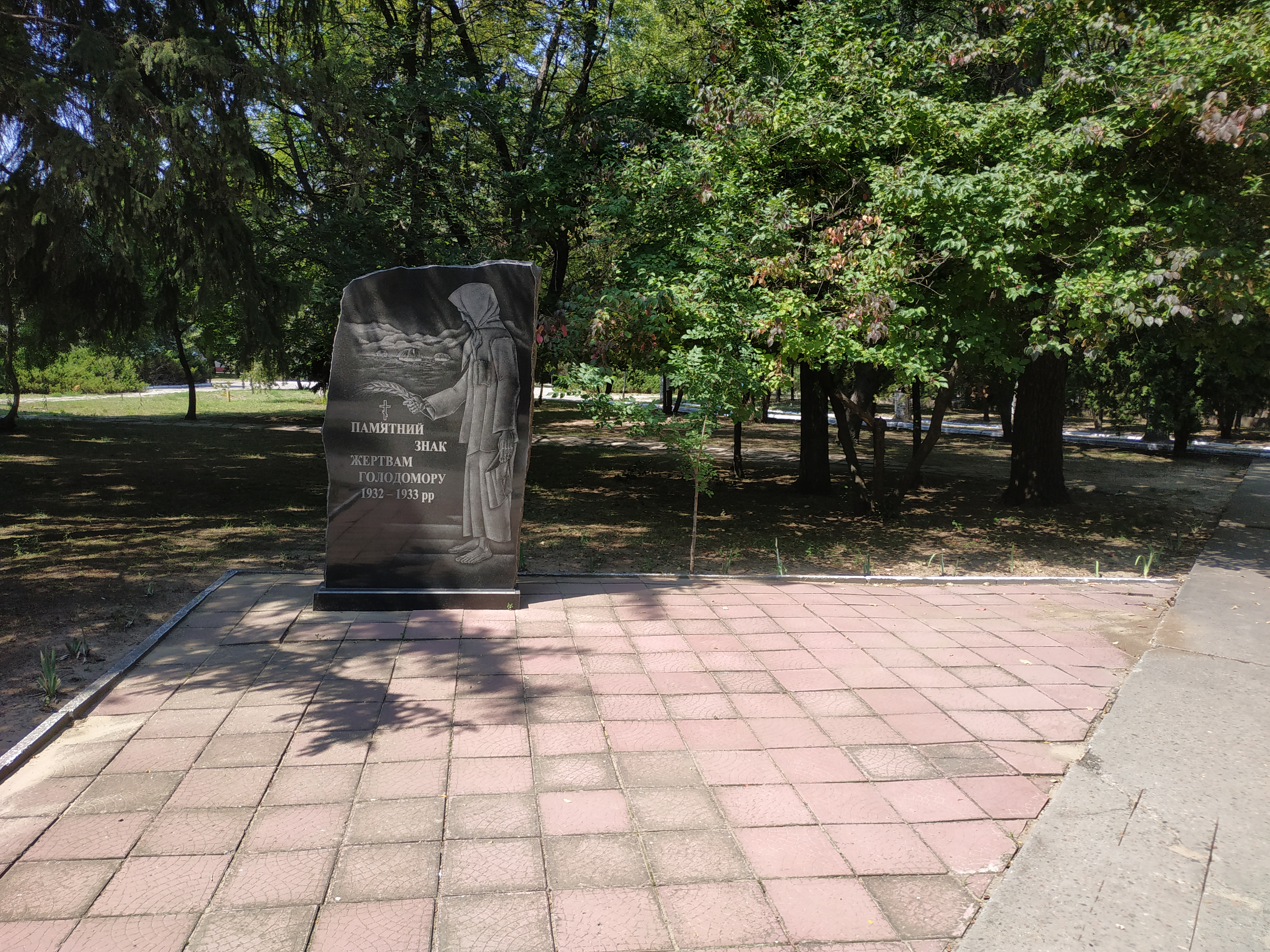
- Memorial to Holodomor victims

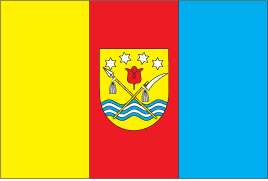
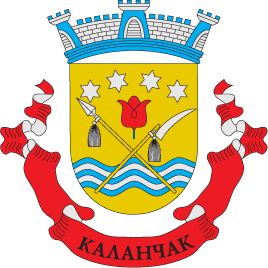
- Flag Coat of arms

- Location within Kherson Oblast Location within Ukraine
- Coordinates: 46°15′08″N 33°17′26″E
- Country: Ukraine
- Oblast: Kherson Oblast
- Raion: Skadovsk Raion
- Hromada: Kalanchak settlement hromada

Area
  - Total: 21.706 km^{2} (8.381 sq mi)

Population (2022)
  - Total: ▼8,977
- Postal code: 75800
- Area code: +380-5530

Kalanchak (Ukrainian: Каланчак, Russian: Каланчак) is a rural settlement in Skadovsk Raion, Kherson Oblast, southern Ukraine. It hosts the administration of the Kalanchak settlement hromada, one of the hromadas of Ukraine. It has a population of 8,977 (2022 estimate).

== History ==
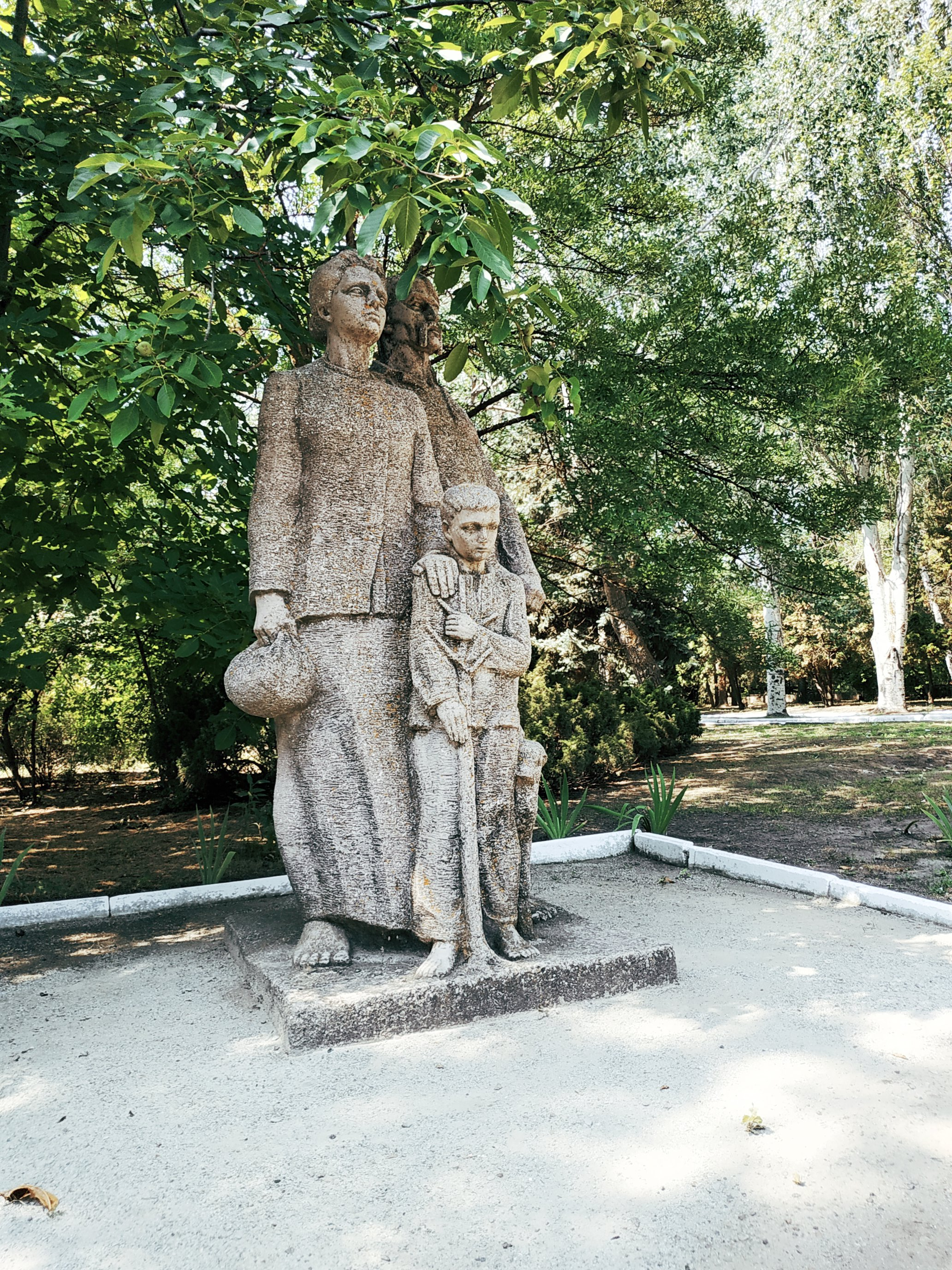
Monument to first inhabitants of Kalanchak

In the Middle Ages, there was a fortification referred to as kale-kucuk (small fortress in Crimean Tatar). The settlement was founded in 1794 as a home for exiled participants in the Turbai uprising.

During the Ukrainian War of Independence, from 1917 to 1920, it passed between various factions. Afterwards, it was administratively part of the Mykolaiv Governorate of Ukraine.

Until 18 July 2020, Kalanchak was the administrative center of Kalanchak Raion. The raion was abolished in July 2020 as part of the administrative reform of Ukraine, which reduced the number of raions of Kherson Oblast to five. The area of Kalanchak Raion was merged into Skadovsk Raion.

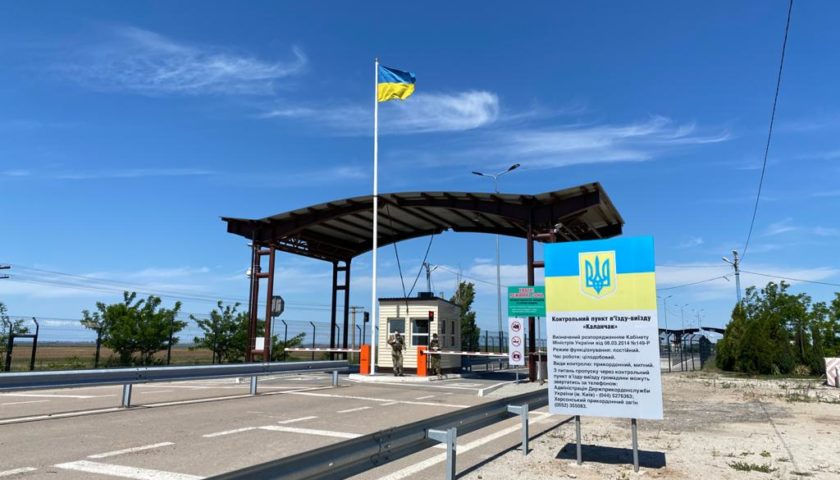
Ukrainian checkpoint for the de facto border between Ukraine and Russian-occupied Crimea in 2021

Kalanchak became the site of the first attack on Ukraine during the Russian invasion of Ukraine, when Russian soldiers attacked an outpost in the town.

On 25 February 2022, the second day of the Russian invasion of Ukraine, Kalanchak appeared in the Russian-controlled area on a map published by the Institute for the Study of War.

Until 26 January 2024, Kalanchak was designated urban-type settlement. On this day, a new law entered into force which abolished this status, and Kalanchak became a rural settlement.

== Demographics ==
As of the 2001 Ukrainian census, Kalanchak had a population of 11,116 inhabitants, which was almost entirely ethnically Ukrainian. Small Russian, Armenian, Moldovan, Belarusian minorities also live in the town, as well as some Romani people. The native language composition was as follows:

Native Languages in Kalanchak
	percent
Ukrainian	92.6%
Russian	6.7%
Armenian	0.2%
Belarusian	0.1%
Moldovan	0.1%
Romani	0.1%
others	0.1%

== Transportation ==
Kalanchak railway station is located in Myrne approximately 10 kilometres (6.2 mi) east of the settlement. It is on the railway which used to connect Kherson with Dzhankoi; however, after the Russian annexation of Crimea in 2014, the trains only run as far as Vadym, close to the border with Crimea. There is infrequent passenger traffic.

The settlement has access to Highway M17, which runs north to Kherson and south to the border with Crimea.

== See also ==
- Russian occupation of Kherson Oblast
