= Velyki Kopani rural hromada =

- Hromada
- Interactive map of Velyki Kopani rural hromada
- Country: Ukraine
- Oblast: Kherson Oblast
- Raion: Kherson Raion
- Admin. center: Velyki Kopani

Velyki Kopani rural hromada (Ukrainian: Великокопанівська сільська об'єднана територіальна громада) is a hromada (community) in southern Ukraine, located in Kherson Raion, Kherson Oblast. Its administrative center is the village Velyki Kopani.

It has an area of 112.8 square kilometres (43.6 mi^{2}), and a population of 6,887.

== Settlements ==
The community includes two villages (Velyki Kopani and Dobrosillia) and one rural-type settlement: Abrykosivka.

== History ==
In 2016, when the hromada was formed, it merged the Abrykosivka hromada and the previous Velyki Kopani hromada, both of which were previously located within the Oleshky Raion for a total of around 7,000 residents. Since the merger, the hromada has moved to direct budget relations within the state, created a local administrative state center, and drafted sustainable development strategies aided by the USAID DOBRE program. The main challenges for the hromada have been poor road infrastructure and tax leakage.

The first elections for the village head of the hromada were held shortly after its formation in 2016 on 18 December 2016. In 2020, with the help of USAID, the hromada's IT strategy was developed of aim for the implementation of digital solutions. Pursuant to this, the official website was created along with pages on social media networks, electronic queues were implemented, and open wi-fi zones were placed around the hromada from the community budget. Also during this year due to administrative-territorial reform and the liquidation of the Oleshky Raion, the hromada was incorporated into the Kherson Raion.
