= Yelena Dmitruk =

Russian politician (born 1980)

- Елена Дмитрук
- Dmitruk (left) in 2026.

Member of the State Duma
- Incumbent
- Assumed office 30 September 2026
- Preceded by: Constituency created
- Constituency: Kherson (No. 187) (Note: Her constituency, Kherson, has been partially occupied by Russia since the 2022 Russian invasion of Ukraine. Ukraine recaptured all of the right bank of the Dnieper, including its seat, Kherson, during the 2022 Kherson counteroffensive, leaving Russia to only control the left-bank. Russia later declared the annexation of Kherson despite not controlling all of it. The UN General Assembly rejected the annexation under Resolution ES-11/4, and the vast majority of international countries do not recognise it either. The constituency is still internationally considered part of Ukraine, although the portions that remain under Russian control are designated to be under Russian occupation.)

Personal details
- Born: Yelena Leonidovna Dmitruk; 15 January 1972 (age 54) Kherson, Ukrainian SSR, Soviet Union
- Party: United Russia
- Education: Kherson State University (1994)

Yelena Leonidovna Dmitruk (Russian: Елена Леонидовна Дмитрук; Ukrainian: Олена Леонідівна Дмитрук born 15 January 1972) is a Russian and formerly Ukrainian politician and businesswoman who has served as a member of the State Duma of the 9th convocation for the United Russia party since 2026.

== Early life ==
Dmitruk was born on 15 January 1972. After graduating from secondary school, she attended Kherson State University, where she graduated from in 1994 with a degree in mathematics and also later finance and credit. Prior to 2022, she was a chief economist and then ran various commercial enterprises, such as the Yantar Trading House, Building Structures Plant, Zernokom Agroyug, and KhersonLift. She also owned a bakery known as PJSC "Kamianskyi" in Beryslav, and after 2022 she also seized the management of the Nova Kakhovka Bakery LLC and the Nova Kakhovsky Trade and Purchasing Consumer Cooperative.

== Political career ==
Dmitruk first attempted to enter politics in 2015, when she ran with the pro-Russian Opposition Bloc for a seat in the Kherson City Council within the 44th district, although she was ultimately not selected.

=== 2022-2026: Early career in Kherson ===
Shortly after the 2022 Russian invasion of Ukraine, Russia seized all of Kherson Oblast, although by 2023 this was significantly reduced after the 2022 Kherson counteroffensive, in which Ukraine recaptured all of the right bank, including Kherson itself, forcing the de facto capital to be Henichesk. Dmitruk would end up siding with the Russians, and began collaborating after she crossed the border from Crimea, where she had lived permanently, to Kherson in June 2022. In 2023, she was included in the United Russia list for the elections to the Russian Kherson Regional Duma, alongside Vladimir Saldo and Igor Kastyukevich. She was successfully elected in September 2023, and later received her mandate as a deputy. She was then elected first deputy head of the Kherson Regional Duma, and also became the regional coordinator of the federal project "Entrepreneurship".

=== 2026-present: State Duma ===
In 2026, Dmitruk announced her intentions to run in the 2026 Russian legislative elections to the 9th convocation with United Russia. The district she ran in, No. 187, included all of Kherson Oblast, even though de facto Russia only controlled some of it; also, unlike most districts, the list of municipalities/cities that reside within it was not named. In the end, she won with 77.36% of the votes. Her main opponents, Ramil Zamaletdinov and Ivan Shumakov, won 8.11% and 7.47%, respectively. In an interview afterwards with a Russian news outlet, she said her main task would be integrating Kherson into Russia as soon as possible, and that she would also like to focus on education and healthcare.

== Personal life ==
She was married to Mykola Dmitruk, a former People's Deputy of Ukraine in the Verkhovna Rada from 2012 to 2014 with the Party of Regions. He passed away in 2021 due to a heart attack. They had one daughter, Sophia. Accordng to Ukrainian sources, she and her daughter had had Russian passports prior to 2022, obtaining them in 2020 in the Nizhny Novgorod Oblast, where they listed their residence near Yalta in Crimea. After obtaining them, they lived in Moscow, with Sofia studying at the Russian Academy of National Economy and Public Administration. Even after she was elected in 2023, Yelena was said to still live in Simferopol while her daughter resided in Moscow.

== International sanctions ==
In 2026, Makarov was included on the international sanctions list of the European Union for her association with United Russia and for participation in the elections with Kherson. She has also been included on the French sanctions register as part of his sanctions under the EU, and the national asset freezing list of Monaco in compliance with the EU since 2026. In Ukraine, he has been included in the sanction list since 2026.
