= Vynohradove rural hromada =

Coordinates: 46°23′18″N 32°59′10″E

Vynohradove rural hromada Виноградівська сільська громада
- Hromada
- Interactive map of Vynohradove rural hromada
- Country: Ukraine
- Oblast: Kherson Oblast
- Raion: Kherson Raion
- Admin. center: Vynohradove
- Settlements: 7
- Villages: 6
- Towns: 1

Vynohradove rural hromada (Ukrainian: Виноградівська сільська громада) is a hromada of Ukraine, located in Kherson Raion, Kherson Oblast. Its administrative center is the village Vynohradove.

== History ==
The hromada was formed on 9 December 2016 in pursuance of Resolution No. 998 in accordance with the Law of Ukraine on voluntary amalgamation of territorial communities, which merged the Brylivka (Brylivka, Myrne), Vynohradove (Vynohradove), and Tarasivka (Klyny, Pryvitne, Tarasivka, Ridne) hromadas together, all of which were located in the Oleshky Raion. The charter was officially approved on September 2017. In July 2020, by the resolution of the Verkhovna Rada 807-IX, the raion in which the hromada had been under, Oleshky, was abolished and the territory was instead merged into that of the Kherson Raion. On 10 May 2023 Valeriy Melnychenko was appointed head of the hromada.

The hromada has been occupied by Russian forces since the start of the Russian invasion of Ukraine. The then Russian-installed deputy head of the Kherson military administration in Kherson Oblast, Kirill Stremousov, accused the head of the hromada of not working with Russian authorities. He threatened the head of the hromada with being removed and punished.

== Settlements ==
The hromada contains the urban-type settlement Brylivka and 6 villages: Klyny, Myrne, Pryvitne, Ridne, Tarasivka, and Vynohradove.
