= Klyny =

Klyny Клини́
- Village
- Interactive map of Klyny
- Location of Klyny within Ukraine Klyny (Ukraine)
- Coordinates: 46°24′25″N 33°03′01″E
- Country: Ukraine
- Oblast: Kherson Oblast
- Raion: Kherson Raion

Area
  - Total: 26.07 km^{2} (10.07 sq mi)
- Elevation: 18 m (59 ft)

Population (2001 census)
  - Total: 534
  - Density: 20.5/km^{2} (53.1/sq mi)
- Time zone: UTC+2 (EET)
  - Summer (DST): UTC+3 (EEST)
- Postal code: 75141
- Area code: +380 5542

Klyny (Ukrainian: Клини́) is a village in Ukraine, located in Vynohradove rural hromada, Kherson Raion, Kherson Oblast.

== History ==
On 28 October 1959, the Klyny state form was founded, which was based on Department No. 3 of the Frunze Velyokopanivsky state farm. This area of the state farm was later the basis for the village. The village was founded in 1967. The village gets it name, which in English translates to "Wedges", due to its geographical location: it fits into a triangle of roads with a wedge.

Since the early days of the Russian invasion of Ukraine in 2022, the village has remained under Russian occupation, as the village is located on the left-bank of the Dnieper in Kherson Oblast, with only the right-bank being liberated in late 2022 during the Kherson counteroffensive.

== Demographics ==
According to the 2001 Ukrainian Census, the only official census taken in post-independence Ukraine, the population of the village was 534 people. Of the people residing in the village, their mother tongue is as follows:

Language	Percentage of Population
Ukrainian	91.20%
Russian	7.12%
Moldovan (Romanian language)	1.12
Other	0.56%

Previously, according the 1989 Soviet Census, the population of the village was 488 people, of which 229 were men and 259 were women.
