= Semyon Mashkautsan =

Russian state official (born 1990)

Semyon Alekseyevich Mashkautsan (Russian: Семён Алексеевич Машкауцан; born March 2, 1990) is a Russian state official, on August 17, 2022 illegally appointed "Deputy Prime Minister of Kherson Oblast" and "Minister of Industry of Kherson Oblast" by Russia, which illegally occupies a number of territories of Ukraine, including Kherson Oblast. Due to this he was sanctioned by the Great Britain (2022), European Union (2024), and some other countries.

== Biography ==
Mashkautsan was born in Chelyabinsk, Russia, to a family that came from Soviet nomenklatura and went into business. He graduated from the Moscow State University and Moscow State Institute of International Relations. After participating in the program for the development of the management personnel reserve (Note: The official name of the proogram: "программа развития кадрового управленческого резерва Высшей школы государственного управления Российской академии народного хозяйства и государственной службы при Президенте Российской Федерации". Mashkautsan personally addressed to Vladimir Putin during Putin's 2023 meeting with the graduates of the program.), since 2015 he held various senior positions in federal executive bodies of Russia. On the occasion of the appointment of Mashkautsan as director of the department of metallurgy and materials of the Ministry of Industry and Trade, industrial analyst Moisei Gelman noted that Mashkautsan had graduated from the MSU in international relations and expressed doubts that he was capable of handling modern complex industrial technologies.

After illegal elections held in September 2023 he became so-called "Deputy Head of Government" of Kherson Oblast.
