= Vynohradove, Kherson Oblast =

Vynohradove, Kherson Oblast Виноградове
- Village
- Location within Kherson Oblast Location within Ukraine
- Coordinates: 46°22′10″N 32°56′10″E
- Country: Ukraine
- Oblast: Kherson Oblast
- Raion: Kherson Raion
- Hromada: Vynohradove rural hromada
- Founded: 1794

Population
  - Total: 4,636

Vynohradove (Ukrainian: Виноградове) is a village in southern Ukraine, located in Kherson Raion, Kherson Oblast. Before 1946, it was named Chalbasy (Ukrainian: Чалбаси). It has a population of 4636 people. It is the center of Vynohradove rural hromada.

== Administrative status ==
Until July 2020, Vynohradove was in the Oleshky Raion of Kherson Oblast. The raion was abolished in July 2020 as a result of the administrative reform of Ukraine's districts, which reduced the number of raions of Kherson Oblast to five, merging Oleshky Raion into Kherson Raion.

== History ==
The village was founded as Chalbasy in 1794 as one of many destinations for exiled insurgents who had taken part in the Turbai uprising. Before then, Chalbasy had been the site of a former Tatar settlement. The location in the steppes in which the village was built was "waterless". Additionally, imperial authorities forbade them from digging wells, forcing them to travel to the Dnipro river 50 kilometres (31 mi) away to collect water. The punishment for digging a well occasionally included hard labor. After a few years, residents eventually discovered a natural well in the wilderness. The prohibition on digging wells was only lifted by the beginning of the 19th century. By 1799, Chalbasy had 1,139 inhabitants, of whom 622 were men and 517 were women.

By 1886, 4788 people lived in Chalbasy, which also contained an Orthodox church and a school. As a result of the Holodomor, 195 people in the village died. In 1946, Chalbasy was renamed to Vynohradove.

Vynohradove was occupied by Russian forces during the Russian invasion of Ukraine. In June 2022, Kirill Stremousov, then the Russian-installed deputy leader of occupied Kherson Oblast complained about resistance from citizens of the village, specifically reporting on "sabotage" by the leader of Vynohradove rural hromada. On 11 May 2023, Ukrainian President Volodymyr Zelenskyy created a military administration for the village.

== Demographics ==
According to the 2001 Ukrainian census, the native languages of the inhabitants were:

Language	%
Ukrainian	95.43%
Russian	3.60%
Armenian	0.65%
Belarusian	0.06%
Hungarian	0.02%
Romani	0.02%
Others	0.22%
