= Myrne, Skadovsk Raion, Kherson Oblast =

Rural locality in Kherson Oblast, Ukraine

Myrne Мирне
- Rural settlement
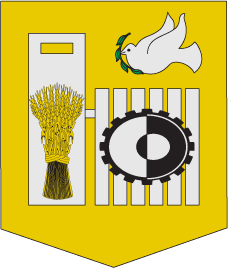
- Coat of arms

- Location in Kherson Oblast Location in Ukraine
- Country: Ukraine
- Oblast: Kherson Oblast
- Raion: Skadovsk Raion
- Hromada: Myrne settlement hromada

Population (2022)
  - Total: ▼1,800
- Time zone: UTC+2 (EET)
  - Summer (DST): UTC+3 (EEST)

Myrne (Ukrainian: Мирне, lit. 'peaceful'; Russian: Мирное) is a rural settlement in Skadovsk Raion, Kherson Oblast, southern Ukraine. It is located in the steppe approximately 10 kilometres (6.2 mi) from the Black Sea coast. Myrne hosts the administration of Myrne settlement hromada, one of the hromadas of Ukraine. It has a population of 1,800 (2022 estimate).

== History ==
Until 18 July 2020, Myrne belonged to Kalanchak Raion. The raion was abolished in July 2020 as part of the administrative reform of Ukraine, which reduced the number of raions of Kherson Oblast to five. The area of Kalanchak Raion was merged into Skadovsk Raion.

Until 26 January 2024, Myrne was designated urban-type settlement. On this day, a new law entered into force which abolished this status, and Myrne became a rural settlement.

Myrne was captured by Russia during the 2022 Russian invasion of Ukraine

In August 2026, Myrne was recaptured by the Ukrainian Ground Forces

== Economy ==
=== Transportation ===
Kalanchak railway station is located in Myrne. It is on the railway which used to connect Kherson with Dzhankoi; however, after the Russian annexation of Crimea in 2014, the trains only run as far as Vadim, close to the border with Crimea. There is infrequent passenger traffic.

The settlement has access to Highway M17, which runs northwest to Kherson and southeast to the border with Crimea.

== See also ==
- Russian occupation of Kherson Oblast
