= Yuvileine, Kherson Oblast =

Village in Kherson Oblast, Ukraine

Yuvileine Ювілейне
- Village
- Location within Kherson Oblast Location within Ukraine
- Coordinates: 46°29′2.8″N 33°12′45.6″E
- Country: Ukraine
- Oblast: Kherson Oblast
- Raion: Kherson Raion
- Hromada: Yuvileine rural hromada

Area
  - Total: 2 km^{2} (0.77 sq mi)

Population
  - Total: 1,558
  - Density: 780/km^{2} (2,000/sq mi)
- Time zone: UTC+2 (EET)
  - Summer (DST): UTC+3 (EEST)
- Postal Code: 75126
- Area code: +380 5542
- Website: https://yuvileyna-gromada.gov.ua/

Yuvileine (Ukrainian: Ювілейне) is a village located in Kherson Raion, Kherson Oblast, Ukraine, south-east of the town of Oleshky. It hosts the administration of the Yuvileine rural hromada, one of the hromadas of Ukraine.

== Geography ==
The village is situated 48 km south east of the administrative centre of the oblast, the city of Kherson, and is 8 km south east of the Oleshky Sands National Nature Park. It has an area of 2 km^{2} and a population of approximately 1,558 people.

== Administrative status ==
Until July 2020, Yuvileine was in the Oleshky Raion of Kherson Oblast. The raion was abolished in July 2020 as a result of the administrative reform of Ukraine's districts, which reduced the number of raions in Kherson Oblast to five, merging Oleshky Raion into Kherson Raion.

== Russian invasion and occupation ==
When Russia invaded Ukraine in 2022, most of Kherson Oblast was captured along with Yuvileine which was captured on the first day of the war, 24 February 2022. The western part of the Oblast, including Kherson and all settlements on the right bank of the Dnipro river, were later liberated by the Ukrainian Armed Forces in November 2022. However, Yuvileine remained occupied. In November 2023, the National Resistance Center of Ukraine claimed that a Ukrainian strike had killed at least five high-ranking Russian officers in the occupied village.

== Demographics ==
As of the 2001 Ukrainian census, Yuvileine had a population of 1,558 inhabitants. The linguistic composition of the population was as follows:

Native languages in Yuvileine
	percent
Ukrainian	92.6%
Russian	5.8%
Romanian	0.3%
Bulgarian	0.2%
Belarusian	0.1%
others	1.1%
