= Oleshky Raion =

Former subdivision of Kherson Oblast, Ukraine

Oleshky Raion Олешківський район
- Raion
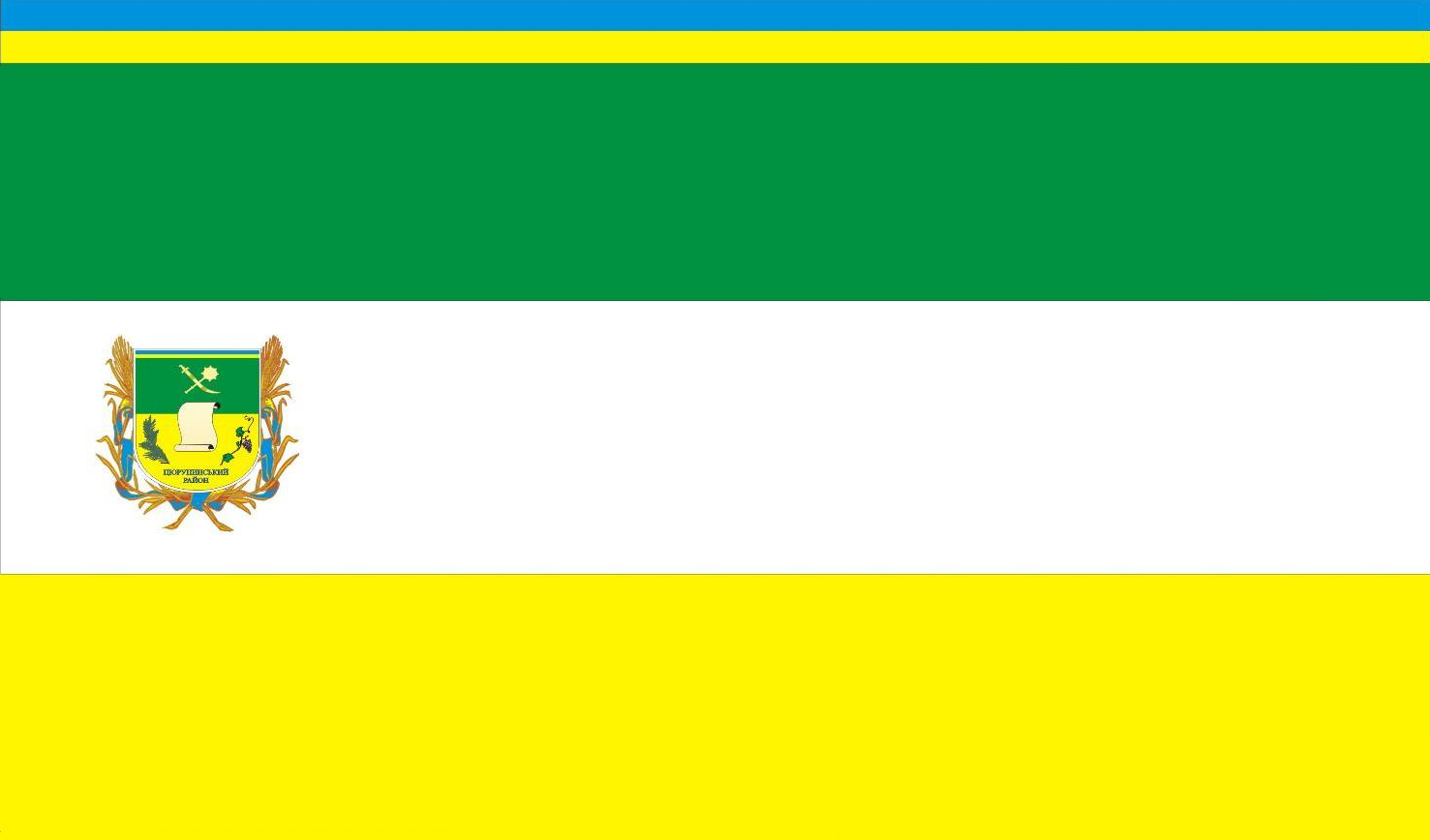
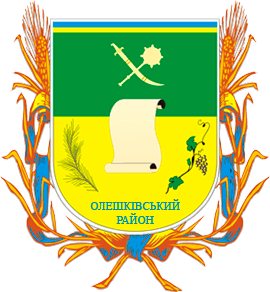
- Flag Coat of arms

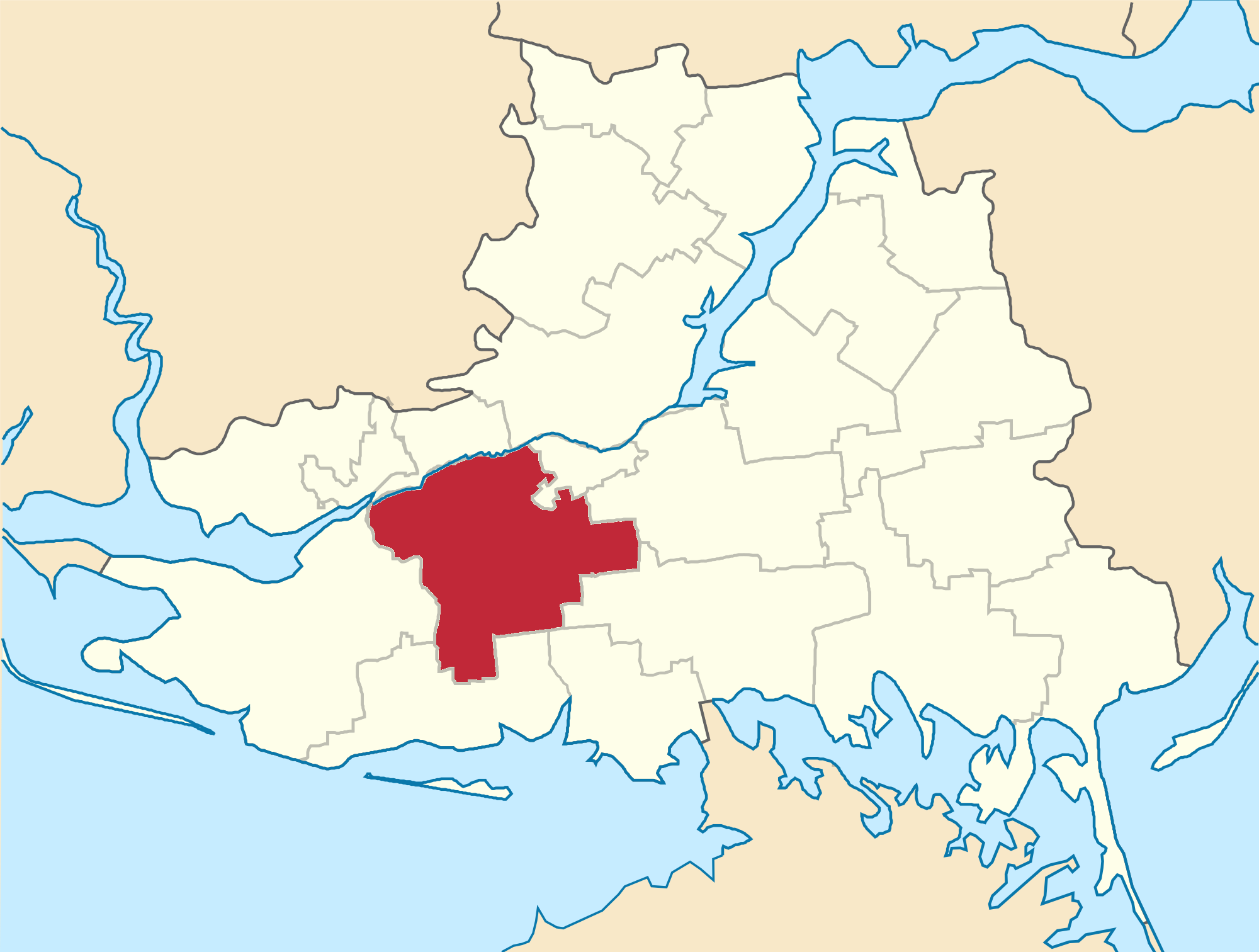
- Coordinates: 46°31′N 33°01′E
- Country: Ukraine (occupied by Russia)
- Region: Kherson Oblast
- Established: 1923
- Disestablished: 18 July 2020
- De-facto reestablishment: 8 July 2022
- Admin. center: Oleshky
- Subdivisions: List: 1 — city councils; 2 — settlement councils; 12 — rural councils; Number of localities: 1 — cities; 2 — urban-type settlements; 23 — villages; 5 — rural settlements

Government
  - Governor: Ruslan Khomenko (de-facto)

Area
  - Total: 1,800 km^{2} (690 sq mi)

Population (2020)
  - Total: 70,128 ▼
  - Density: 39/km^{2} (100/sq mi)
- Time zone: UTC+02:00 (EET)
  - Summer (DST): UTC+03:00 (EEST)
- Postal index: 75100—75145
- Area code: +380 5542
- Website: https://aleshki-r74.gosweb.gosuslugi.ru/ (Russian-administered)

Oleshky Raion (Ukrainian: Олешківський район) Formerly called Tsiurupynsk Raion, was one of the 18 administrative raions (a district) of Kherson Oblast in southern Ukraine. Its administrative center was located in the city of Oleshky. The raion was abolished on 18 July 2020 as part of the administrative reform of Ukraine, which reduced the number of raions of Kherson Oblast to five. The area of Oleshky Raion was merged into Kherson Raion. The last estimate of the raion population was 70,128 (2020 est.)

== History ==
The Oleshky Raion was originally formed in 1923 in the Ukrainian SSR, in 1928 the Raion was renamed to the Tsiurupynsk Raion.

In May 2016, the Verkhovna Rada renamed Tsiurupynsk Raion back to Oleshky Raion conform with the law prohibiting names of the communist origin.

At the time of disestablishment, the raion consisted of four hromadas:

- Oleshky urban hromada with the administration in Oleshky;
- Velyki Kopani rural hromada with the administration in the selo of Velyki Kopani;
- Vynohradove rural hromada with the administration in the selo of Vynohradove;
- Yuvileine rural hromada with the administration in the settlement of Yuvileine.

During the Russian occupation of Kherson Oblast, the Russian-installed governor Vladimir Saldo, signed a decree on July 8, 2022 and restorned the district with the name "Aleshkinsky District" and Ruslan Khomenko as its first governor.

At the time of reestablishment, the district is consisted of 9 departmennst.

- Aleshkinsky city department
- Abrikosovsky territorial department
- Brilevsky territorial department
- Velikokopanskaya territorial department
- Vinogradovsky territorial department
- Novomayachkovsky territorial department
- Radensky territorial department
- Schastlivsky territorial department
- Tarasovsky territorial department
