= Vinogradov (disambiguation) =

Vinogradov is a Russian surname.

Vinogradov (with variant spellings) may also refer to:

- Mons Vinogradov, lunar mountains named after Alexander Pavlovich Vinogradov
- Vinogradov (crater), Martian impact crater
- Vinogradov fracture zone, Antarctic undersea fracture zone
- Vynohradiv, city in Western Ukraine
- Russian destroyer Admiral Vinogradov, Udaloy-class destroyer of the Russian Navy

== See also ==
- Bombieri–Vinogradov theorem, in math
- Vinogradov's theorem, in math
- Vinogradov's jerboa, a rodent species in the family Dipodidae
- Vinogradov's jird, a rodent species in the family Muridae
