= 2024 Lysychansk missile strike =

2024 missile strike in Ukraine in the Russo-Ukrainian war

February 2024 Lysychansk missile strike
- Part of the Russo-Ukrainian war (2022–present)
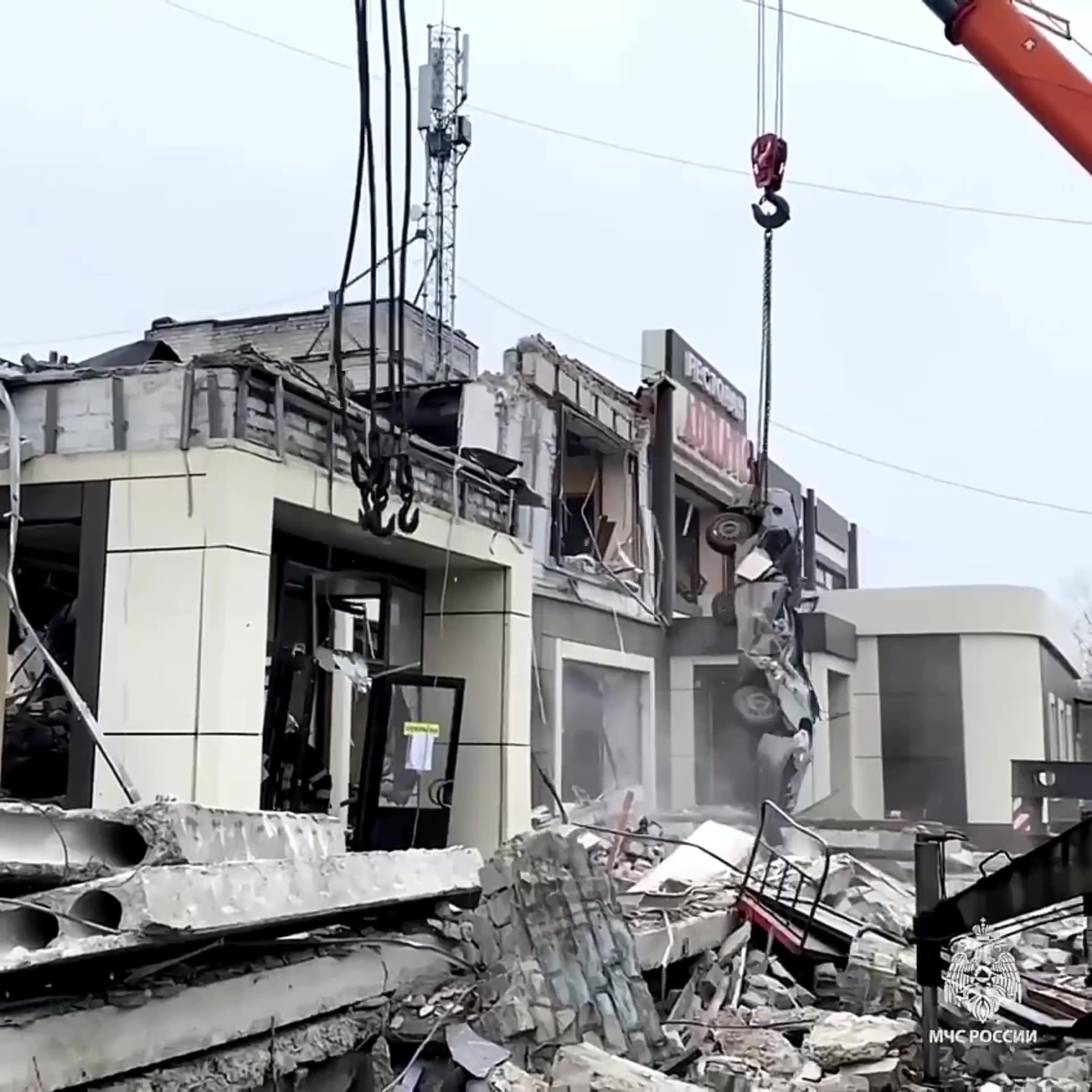
- Aftermath of the strike
- Location: 48°54′53″N 38°24′36″E; Lysychansk, Ukraine
- Date: 3 February 2024
- Attack type: Airstrike
- Deaths: 28+ (claimed by Russia)
- Perpetrator: Ukraine (claimed by Russia)

On 3 February 2024, a Ukrainian missile struck a cafe in the Russian occupied city of Lysychansk as part of the Russo-Ukrainian war (2022–present). Russian sources claimed 28 civilians, including three high-ranking collaborators, were killed in the cafe, while Ukraine has not yet commented on the attack.

== Attack ==
=== Background ===
Lysychansk was the site of a pitched battle in June 2022 which, after over a week, saw the city captured by elements of the Russian Armed Forces and the Luhansk people's militia, and a collaborationist government was established and placed under the control of the Luhansk People's Republic (LPR), a separatist puppet state that claims control over all of Ukraine's Luhansk Oblast.

=== Strike ===
Russian state media had difficulty identifying the store which was targeted, first calling it a bakery, and then a restaurant, before the location was identified as the Adriatica café by milblogers. Eduard Sakhnenko, the Russian-installed mayor of Lysychansk reported that the attack was a missile strike and that there where at least 28 civilian casualties, three of which were local politicians including a member of the LPR's executive branch.

=== Victims ===
The missile strike targeted the Adriatica café during the birthday celebrations of Ivan Zhushma, a local collaborator and a member of the legislature of the LPR. Russian state news agency RIA Novosti stated that the attack killed several high-ranking LPR officials including:

- Alexey Poteleschenko — Luhansk People's Republic's Emergency Situations Minister
- Artem Trostyansky — Member of the People's Council of the Luhansk People's Republic
- Ivan Zhushma — Member of the People's Council of the Luhansk People's Republic

== See also ==
- Timeline of the Russo-Ukrainian war (1 December 2023 – 31 March 2024)
