= Kalanchak Raion =

Former subdivision of Kherson Oblast, Ukraine

Kalanchakskyi Raion Каланчацький район
- Raion
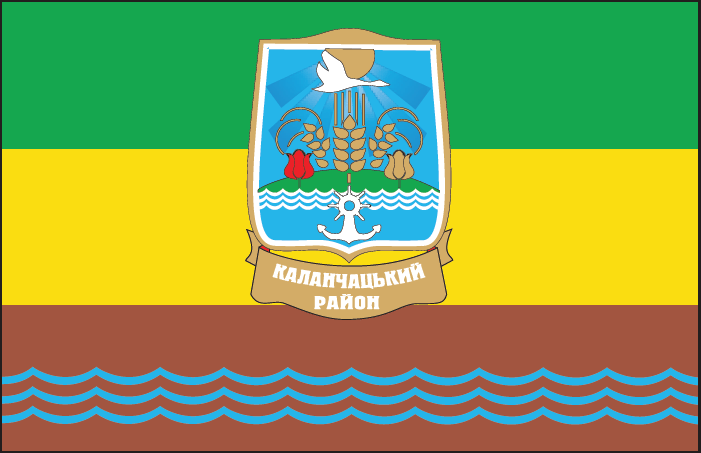
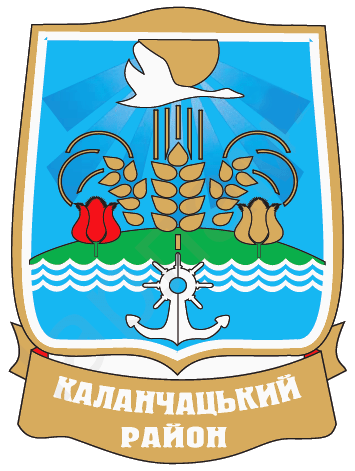
- Flag Coat of arms

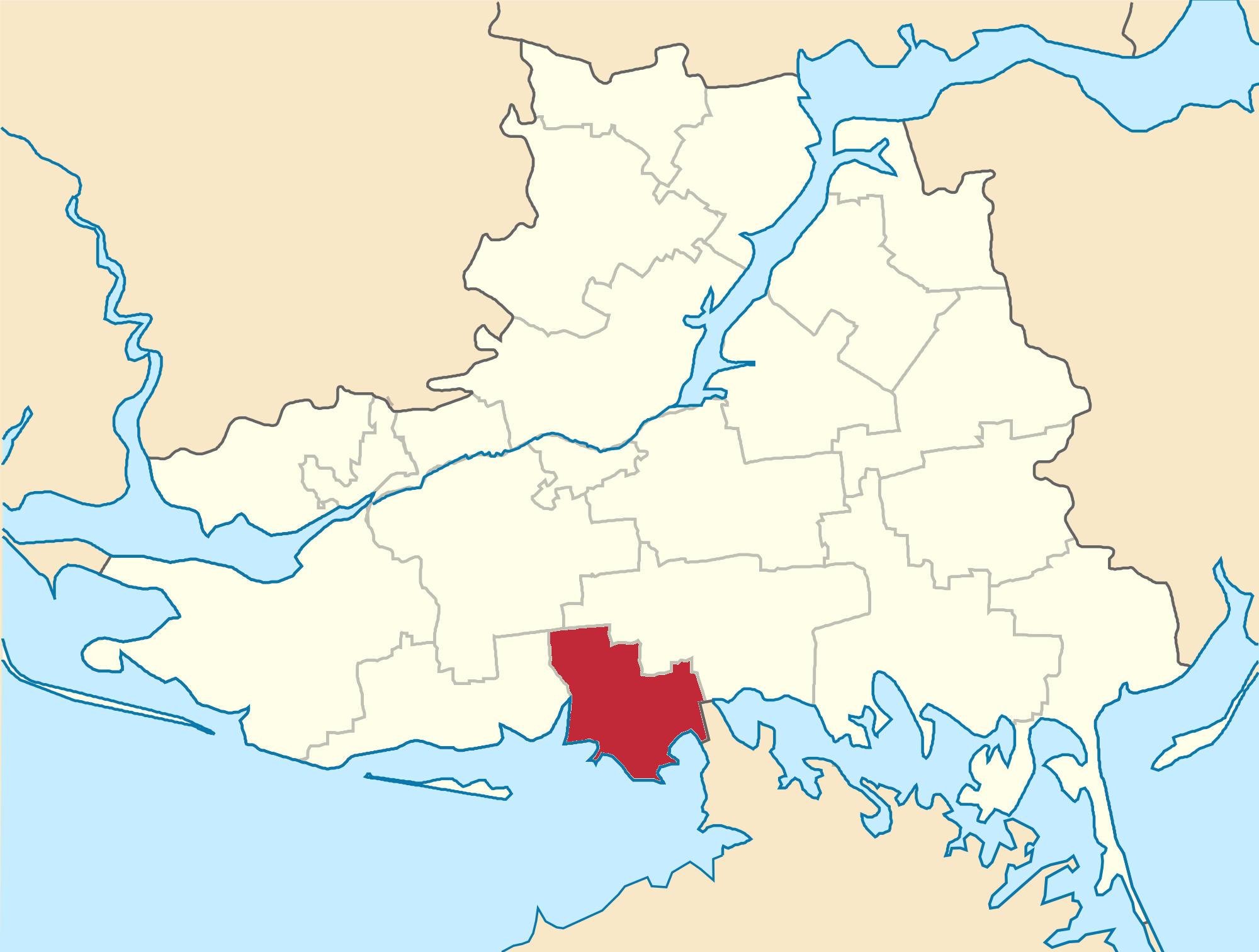
- Coordinates: 46°8′52.6734″N 33°22′44.8746″E
- Country: Ukraine
- Region: Kherson Oblast
- Established: 1939
- Disestablished: 18 July 2020
- Admin. center: Kalanchak
- Subdivisions: List: 0 — city councils; 2 — settlement councils; 10 — rural councils; Number of localities: 0 — cities; 2 — urban-type settlements; 19 — villages; 1 — rural settlements

Government
  - Governor: Volodymyr Zinchuk

Area
  - Total: 915 km^{2} (353 sq mi)

Population (2020)
  - Total: 21,032 ▼
  - Density: 23.0/km^{2} (59.5/sq mi)
- Time zone: UTC+02:00 (EET)
  - Summer (DST): UTC+03:00 (EEST)
- Postal index: 75800—75841
- Area code: +380 5530

Kalanchak Raion (Ukrainian: Каланчацький район) was one of the 18 administrative raions (a district) of Kherson Oblast in southern Ukraine. Its administrative center was located in the urban-type settlement of Kalanchak. The raion was abolished on 18 July 2020 as part of the administrative reform of Ukraine, which reduced the number of raions of Kherson Oblast to five. The area of Kalanchak Raion was merged into Skadovsk Raion. The last estimate of the raion population was 21,032 (2020 est.)

At the time of disestablishment, the raion consisted of two hromadas:

- Kalanchak settlement hromada with the administration in Kalanchak;
- Myrne settlement hromada with the administration in the urban-type settlement of Myrne.
