= Vynohradove, Crimea =

Human settlement in Republic of Crimea

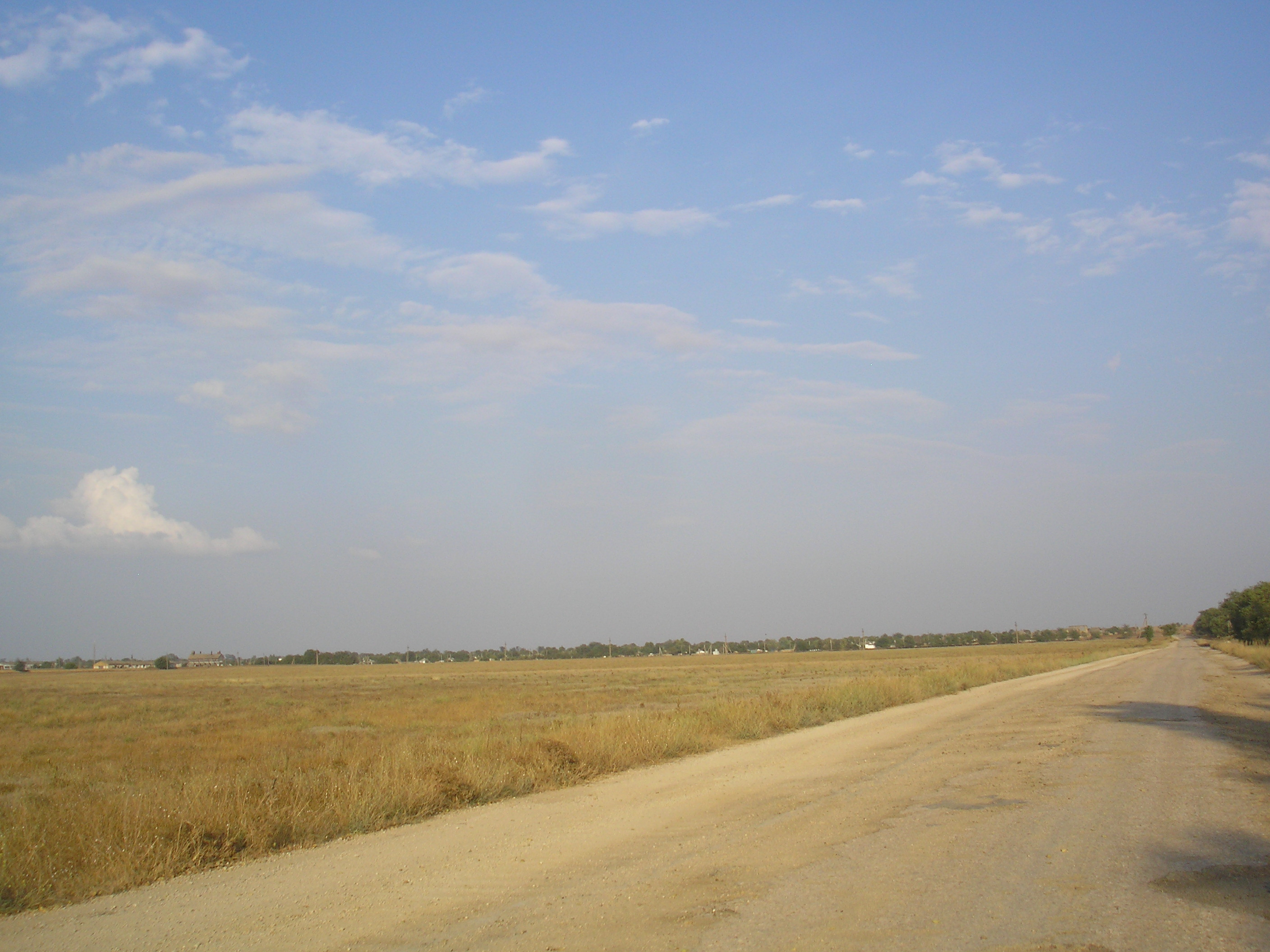
Village Vinogradovo, Saki district, Crimea

Vynohradove (Ukrainian: Виноградове, Russian: Виногра́дово, romanized: Vinogradovo), known as Boz-Ohlu-Montanay (Crimean Tatar: Боз Огълу Монтанай, romanized: Boz Oğlu Montanay; Ukrainian: Боз-Оглу-Монтанай; Russian: Боз-Оглу́-Монтана́й, romanized: Boz-Oglu-Montanay) before 1948, is a village in Saky Raion, Crimea.

== Demographics ==
According to the 2001 Ukrainian census, 76.69% of the population spoke Russian, 20.08% spoke Ukrainian, and 1.37% spoke other languages.

== Features ==
In 2016, the village had 7 streets. In 2009, according to the village council, the village occupied an area of 160 hectares (0.62 sq mi; 1.6 km^{2}) hectares, on which 1117 residents were registered in 417 households. There is a secondary school in the village, a kindergarten, a House of Culture, a library, and a church.

The village is connected by bus to Yevpatoria and neighboring settlements.
