= Igor Kastyukevich =

Russian politician and Mayor of Kherson

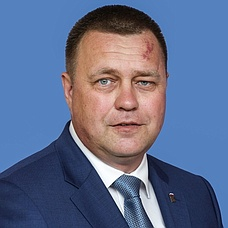

Senator of the Federation Council from the Kherson Oblast
- Incumbent
- Assumed office 20 September 2023
- Governor: Vladimir Saldo
- Preceded by: position has been established

Member of the Kherson Oblast Duma
- In office 10 September – 20 September 2023
- Constituency: Kherson Oblast

Member of the State Duma
- In office 19 September 2021 – 20 September 2023
- Succeeded by: Alexander Sidyakin
- Constituency: Voronezh Oblast

Personal details
- Born: 6 December 1976 (age 49) Saratov, Russian Soviet Federative Socialist Republic, USSR
- Party: United Russia
- Education: Saratov Military Institute Of Internal Troops Of The Ministry Of Internal Affairs Of Russia

Igor Yurievich Kastyukevich (Russian: Игорь Юрьевич Кастюкевич; born 6 December 1976 in Saratov) is a Russian political. Senator of the Federation Council of the Russia from the Kherson Oblast from 20 September 2023 year.

First Deputy Chairman of the State Duma Russia committee on Youth Policy, deputy of the 8th State Duma Russia from 2021 to 2023.

== Biografy ==
He was born on December 6, 1976, in Saratov.

In 1999, he graduated from the Law Faculty of the Saratov Military Institute of Internal Troops of the Ministry of Internal Affairs of the Russian Federation (now the Saratov Military Institute of the National Guard Russia), and in 2006, he graduated from the Stolypin Volga Region Academy of Public Administration (now the Stolypin Volga Region Institute of Management within the Russian Presidential Academy of National Economy and Public Administration).

From 1999 to 2003, he served in the Russian Armed Forces.

In 2003 he started working in the sports development department of the Ministry of Youth Policy, Sports and Tourism of Saratov Oblast. He left the post to become the head of the combat sports center in Saratov Oblast.

From 2008 to 2011, he headed the Saratov Children's and Youth Sports School in martial arts.

In 2011–2020, he headed the National Aikido Council of Russia.

In 2017, he was appointed the head of the department of Youth Projects of the All-Russia People's Front.

In 2018, he joined the Presidential Council for the Implementation of State Policy in the Field of Family and Child Protection.

Since 2021 to 2023, he has served as deputy of the 8th State Duma Russia.

Since October 7, 2021, he has been the Deputy Head of the United Russia faction, led by Vladimir Vasilyev.

Since November 2021, he has been a member of the General Council Commission of the «United Russia» Party for the Protection of Maternity, Childhood, and Family Support.

From 2021 to 2023, he served as the First Deputy Chairman of the State Duma Russia Committee on Youth Policy under Artem Metelev.

Since February 2022, he has been the Youth Affairs Coordinator for the «United Russia» political party. His responsibilities include coordinating the activities of the Young Guard United Russia, developing proposals for the party's General Council Presidium on implementing youth programs, and improving youth policy.

Since December 8, 2022, he has been the Secretary of the regional branch of the United Russia party in the Kherson region. He is also a member of the party's General Council.

From 10 September to 20 September 2023, – member of the first convocation of the Kherson Oblast Duma.

20 September 2023 year later was appointed as a senator of the Federation Council of Russia from the regional legislature.

== Awards ==
He was awarded the Order of Courage (2022). He has a commendation (2015) and an honorary certificate (2020) from the President of the Russian Federation.

He is one of the winners managers of the «Leaders of Russia. Politics». competition (2020).

He is a candidate for a master's degree in SAMBO.

== Activities ==
Kastyukevich is the author of several projects that became winners of social and cultural competitions. For example, the project “Bring Your Child to Sports!” helps parents and children understand which sports club to choose and how to develop a love for an active lifestyle.

He is the initiator of the nationwide project “Coach”, aimed at the socialization of troubled teenagers.

In 2020, he became one of the winners of the competition “Leaders of Russia. Politics.”

In the summer of 2021, he led a volunteer mission to eliminate the consequences of wildfires in Yakutia. Under his leadership, about a hundred volunteers from 19 regions of the country helped restore the republic after the fires for two weeks.

== Sanctions ==
He was sanctioned by the UK government in 2022 in relation to the Russo-Ukrainian War.

He is one of the members of the State Duma the United States Treasury sanctioned on 24 March 2022 in response to the 2022 Russian invasion of Ukraine.
