= Velyki Kopani =

Velyki Kopani Великі Копані
- Village
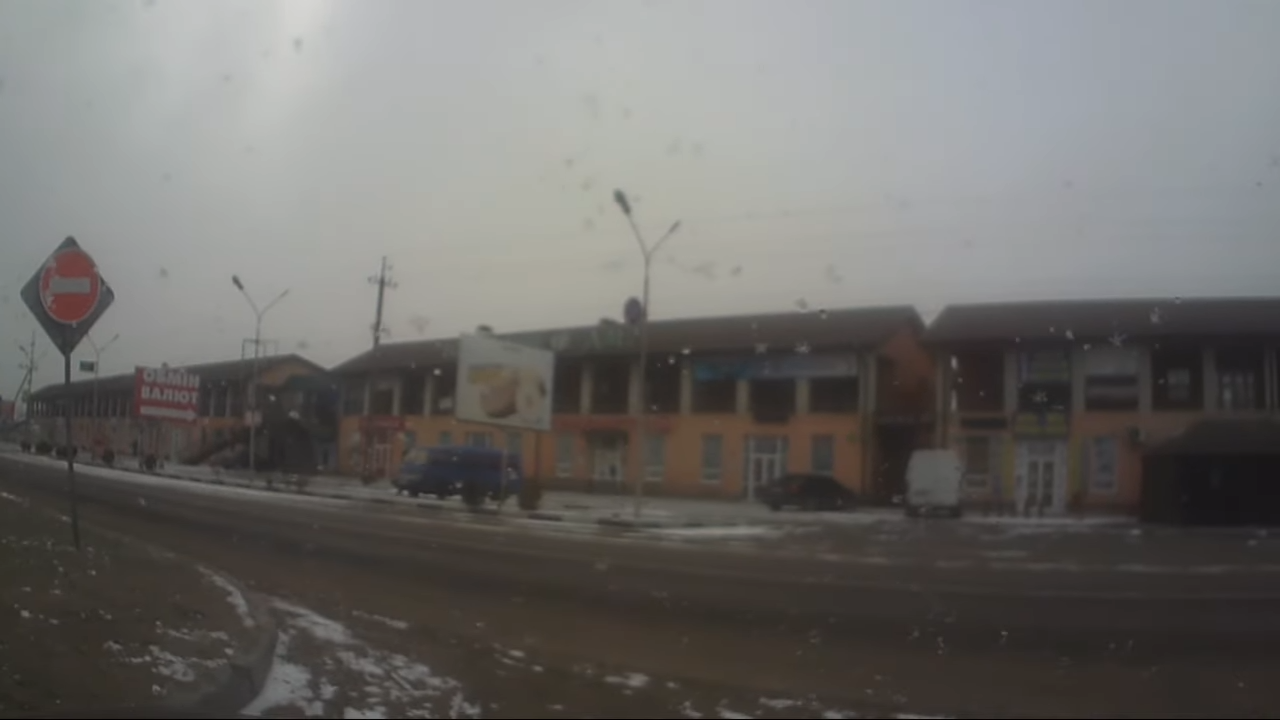
- A street in Velyki Kopani, pictured in March 2022

- Location within Kherson Oblast Location within Ukraine
- Coordinates: 46°29′20″N 32°58′28″E
- Country: Ukraine
- Oblast: Kherson Oblast
- Raion: Kherson Raion
- Hromada: Velyki Kopani rural hromada
- Founded: 1795

Population
  - Total: 5,654
- Area code: 05542
- Website: https://kopani.org.ua/

Velyki Kopani (Ukrainian: Великі Копа́ні) is a village (selo) in southern Ukraine, located in Kherson Raion, Kherson Oblast. It has a population of 5654 people. It is located 44 km from the city of Kherson.

It is the administrative center of Velyki Kopani rural hromada, one of the hromadas (communities) of Ukraine.

== History ==
As of 1886, 3990 people lived in the area, and there was an Orthodox church in the village, a school, 5 benches, and two fairs every year.

=== 21st century ===
During the COVID-19 pandemic, the Nezhdana market was closed due to safety concerns. In June 2021, Deutsche Welle reported that all management positions in the village were held by women, and the positive consequences of that.

During the 2022 Russian invasion of Ukraine, it has been occupied by the Russian Armed Forces.

== Economy ==
The Nezhdana market in Velyki Kopani is the largest wholesale market in southern Ukraine.

== Demographics ==
According to the 1989 Ukrainian census, 4640 people lived in the village, of whom 2087 were men and 2553 were women.

By 2001, the population had increased to 5675. According to the 2001 Ukrainian census, the native languages of the population of the city were:

Language	Percentage
Ukrainian	91.03 %
Russian	6.77 %
Armenian	1.43 %
Romanian	0.28 %
Belarusian	0.19 %
Hungarian	0.04 %
Bulgarian	0.02 %
Greek	0.02 %
Other	0.22 %

== Notable people ==
- Pavlo Shushko (born 2000), footballer
