= Russian occupation of Kherson Oblast =

Russian military occupation in region of Ukraine

- the Russo-Ukrainian war (2022–present)
- Territory of Kherson Oblast controlled by Russia shown in pink; territory claimed but not controlled shown in yellow and blue.
- Location: Kherson Oblast, Ukraine
- Date: February 2022 – present

The ongoing military occupation of Ukraine's Kherson Oblast by Russian forces began on 24 February 2022, when Russian forces invaded Ukraine from Crimea. It was administered under a Russian-controlled military-civilian administration until 30 September 2022, when the Russian government declared it had annexed the territory (an annexation widely regarded as illegal and unrecognized internationally). Since then Russia administers it as an internationally unrecognized federal subject of Russia.

Russia captured the city of Kherson on 1 March 2022. Kherson was the only regional capital that Russia has managed to capture in the invasion, though the cities of Donetsk and Luhansk had been controlled by Russian-backed separatists since 2014. Most of the rest of Kherson Oblast fell to Russian forces in the early months of the invasion.

Russia laid the groundwork for annexation in the following months by introducing the Russian ruble as official currency and forcibly removing the hryvnia from circulation. After holding staged referendums in September 2022, Russia declared that it had annexed Kherson Oblast on 30 September, including parts of the oblast that it did not control at the time and small occupied areas of neighboring Mykolaiv Oblast. (Note: On 30 September 2022, Russia declared that it had annexed the entirety of (1) Donetsk Oblast aka Donetsk People's Republic, (2) Kherson Oblast, (3) Luhansk Oblast aka Luhansk People's Republic, and (4) Zaporizhzhia Oblast. None of these four oblasts was entirely under Russia's control at the time. Russia also annexed a small portion of Mykolaiv Oblast that it controlled at the time, which it administratively merged into Kherson Oblast.) The United Nations General Assembly condemned the annexations as violating international law in Resolution ES-11/4.

In October 2022, as a Ukrainian counteroffensive approached the city of Kherson itself, the Russian administration's executive bodies evacuated from Kherson to the left bank of the Dnieper River. They set up a new administrative centre in Henichesk, in the far south of the Kherson region. Throughout early November 2022, Russian forces fully withdrew from all the areas of Kherson and Mykolaiv regions on the right bank of the Dnieper, including the city of Kherson proper. Ukrainian forces entered the city of Kherson on 11 November. According to Kremlin spokesman Dmitry Peskov, the Kherson region remained a "subject of the Russian Federation" despite the withdrawal.

== Background ==
Movement of Russian military vehicles from Crimea to Kherson region 24 February 2022

During the 2014 occupation of Crimea, Russian forces also occupied a gas distribution centre at the town of Strilkove on the Arabat spit in Kherson Oblast, from 15 March. In December 2014, they left territories of Kherson, including the area of Strilkove, the Ad peninsula, and the village of Chonhar.

On 24 February 2022, Russian forces began an invasion of Ukraine. Fighting began across the Kherson Oblast, resulting in multiple Russian successes. On 1 March, Russian forces captured the capital city of the oblast, Kherson, beginning a military occupation of the city.

== History ==
=== Initial military occupation ===
Shortly after Kherson was captured, the Russian Ministry of Defence said talks between Russian forces and city administrators regarding the maintenance of order were underway. An agreement was reached in which the Ukrainian flag would still be hoisted in the city while Russia established the new administration. Mayor Ihor Kolykhaiev announced new conditions for the city's residents: citizens could only go outside during daytime and were forbidden to gather in groups. Additionally, cars were only allowed to enter the city to supply food and medicine; these vehicles were to drive at minimum speeds and were subject to searches. Citizens were warned not to provoke Russian soldiers and obey any commands given.

In the first days of the invasion, Russian forces established control over and unblocked the North Crimean Canal, effectively rescinding a longstanding water blockage imposed on Crimea by Ukraine after the 2014 Russian annexation of the peninsula.

On 5 March, Kolykhaiev said that there was no armed resistance in the city and Russian troops were "quite settled". He requested humanitarian aid, stating that the city lacked power, water, and medicine. Later that day, around 2,000 protesters marched in the city center. The protesters waved Ukrainian flags, sang the national anthem, and chanted patriotic slogans. A video showed Russian soldiers firing into the air to dissuade the protestors. There were also claims that the Russian force had a list of Ukrainian activists in the city that they wanted to capture. On 9 March, the General Staff of the Ukrainian Armed Forces stated that Russia had detained more than 400 people in Kherson due to ongoing protests.

On 12 March, Ukrainian officials said that Russia was planning to stage a referendum in Kherson to establish the Kherson People's Republic, similar to the Donetsk People's Republic and the Luhansk People's Republic. Serhiy Khlan, deputy leader of the Kherson Oblast Council, said that the Russian military had called all the members of the council and asked them to cooperate. Lyudmyla Denisova, Ombudsman of Ukraine, stated that the referendum would be illegal because "under Ukrainian law any issues over territory can only be resolved by a nationwide referendum". Later that day, the Kherson Oblast Council passed a resolution stating that the proposed referendum would be illegal.

On 13 March, Ukrayinska Pravda, a Ukrainian newspaper, reported that several thousand people in Kherson took part in a protest. Russian soldiers dispersed the protest with gunfire, stun grenades, and rubber bullets, injuring several people. On the same day, the Russian occupation issued new laws in Kakhovka, Nova Kakhovka and Tavriisk preventing residents from gathering in groups, photographing the Russian military, and possessing weapons. The mayor of Skadovsk was briefly detained on 16 March.

On 22 March, the Ukrainian government warned Kherson was facing a "humanitarian catastrophe" as the city was running out of food and medical supplies and accused Russia of blocking evacuation of civilians to Ukraine-controlled territory. Russia countered by saying that its military helped deliver aid to the city's population. A local journalist stated that there was only a staged event, in which former prisoners from Crimea were brought in to act as locals welcoming the Russians and accepting their assistance. According to several media outlets, residents report intrusive checkpoints, abductions, and Russian looting of shops.

=== Military-civilian administration ===
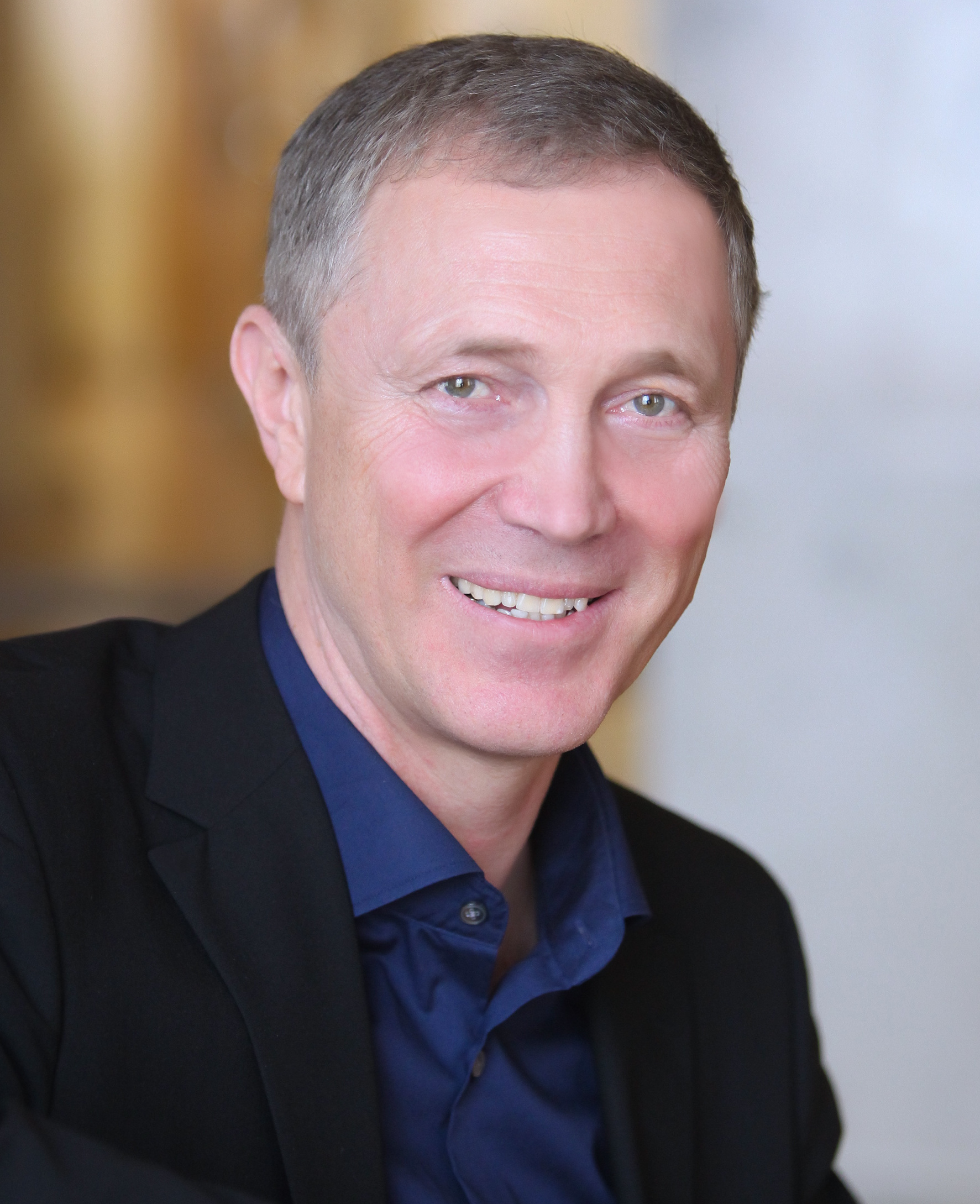
Vladimir Saldo

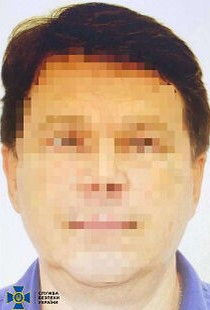
Oleksandr Kobets

In early April, Russian soldiers tore down the Ukrainian flag at the government administrative building.

On 18 April, Igor Kastyukevich, a Russian politician and deputy of the 8th State Duma, was allegedly appointed by the Russian government as a de facto mayor. Kastyukevich denied these reports.

By 26 April, Russian troops took over Kherson City's administration headquarters and appointed a new mayor, former KGB agent Oleksandr Kobets, and a new civilian-military regional administrator, ex-mayor Vladimir Saldo. The next day, Ukraine's Prosecutor General said that troops used tear gas and stun grenades to disperse a pro-Ukraine protest in the city centre.

On 27 April, the Legislative Assembly of Krasnoyarsk Krai in Siberia approved the expropriation of grain from the Kherson region. Agricultural machinery from the occupied Kherson region was also transported to remote Russian lands, including Chechnya. Lyudmila Denisova, the Ukrainian Parliament Commissioner for Human Rights, likened the plan to repeating the Holodomor, a famine in Soviet Ukraine in 1932–1933 that killed millions of Ukrainians. The plan was eventually put into action on 30 May, according to Russia. Russian officials were also working on exporting sunflower seeds. According to locals, Russian soldiers were being employed as strawberry pickers in Kherson Oblast.

On 27 April, the Ukrainian Air Force struck the Kherson TV Tower with a missile temporarily forcing Russian television off-air.

In an indication of an intended split from Ukraine, on 28 April the new military-civilian administration announced that from May it would switch the region's currency to the Russian ruble. Additionally, citing unnamed reports that alleged discrimination against Russian speakers, its deputy head, Kirill Stremousov said that "reintegrating the Kherson region back into a Nazi Ukraine is out of the question". On 29 April, Saldo stated that the official languages of the Kherson Oblast would be both Ukrainian and Russian and that the International Settlements Bank from South Ossetia would open 200 branches in Kherson Oblast soon. On 1 May, a four-month plan was adopted for a full transition to rubles. At the same time, the Ukrainian hryvnia was to remain the current currency along with the ruble for four months. On 7 May, a new coat of arms was adopted, based on the 1803 coat of arms of Kherson of the Russian Empire.

On 9 May, an Immortal Regiment event took place in Kherson City, celebrating Victory Day. Soviet-era victory flags and red banners were flown.

On 11 May 2022, Kirill Stremousov announced his readiness to send President Vladimir Putin a request for Kherson Oblast to directly join the Russian Federation without any referendum or creation of an independent "Kherson People's Republic" prior to joining. Commenting on these statements, Putin's press secretary Dmitry Peskov said that this issue should be decided by the inhabitants of the region and that "these fateful decisions must have an absolutely clear legal background, legal justification, be absolutely legitimate, as was the case with Crimea".

On 30 May 2022, the Russian-backed occupation authority in Kherson said that it had started exporting last year's grain from Kherson to Russia. They would also be working on exporting sunflower seeds. By June, the occupiers were switching Ukrainian schools to their educational curriculum and Russian SIM cards were on the market. Kolykhaiev witnessed the occupiers distributing Russian passports. A cafe frequented by the occupiers was bombed on 7 June and at least four people were injured.

On 6 June, it was reported by the Ukrainian mayor of Kherson, Ihor Kolykhaiev, that the occupiers had conducted a meeting of more than 70 Russian sympathizers aimed at conducting a referendum on the region integrating the occupied areas into Russia. His sources told him that the dates discussed were two: in September or at the end of 2022. As a Russian election was going to take place on 11 September, the Kherson vote would be scheduled to coincide with that day. An elected official in Russia named Igor Kastyukevich had discussed this plan on 7 June, following the visit to Kherson of Sergei Kiriyenko, the deputy chief of staff of the Russian presidential administration.

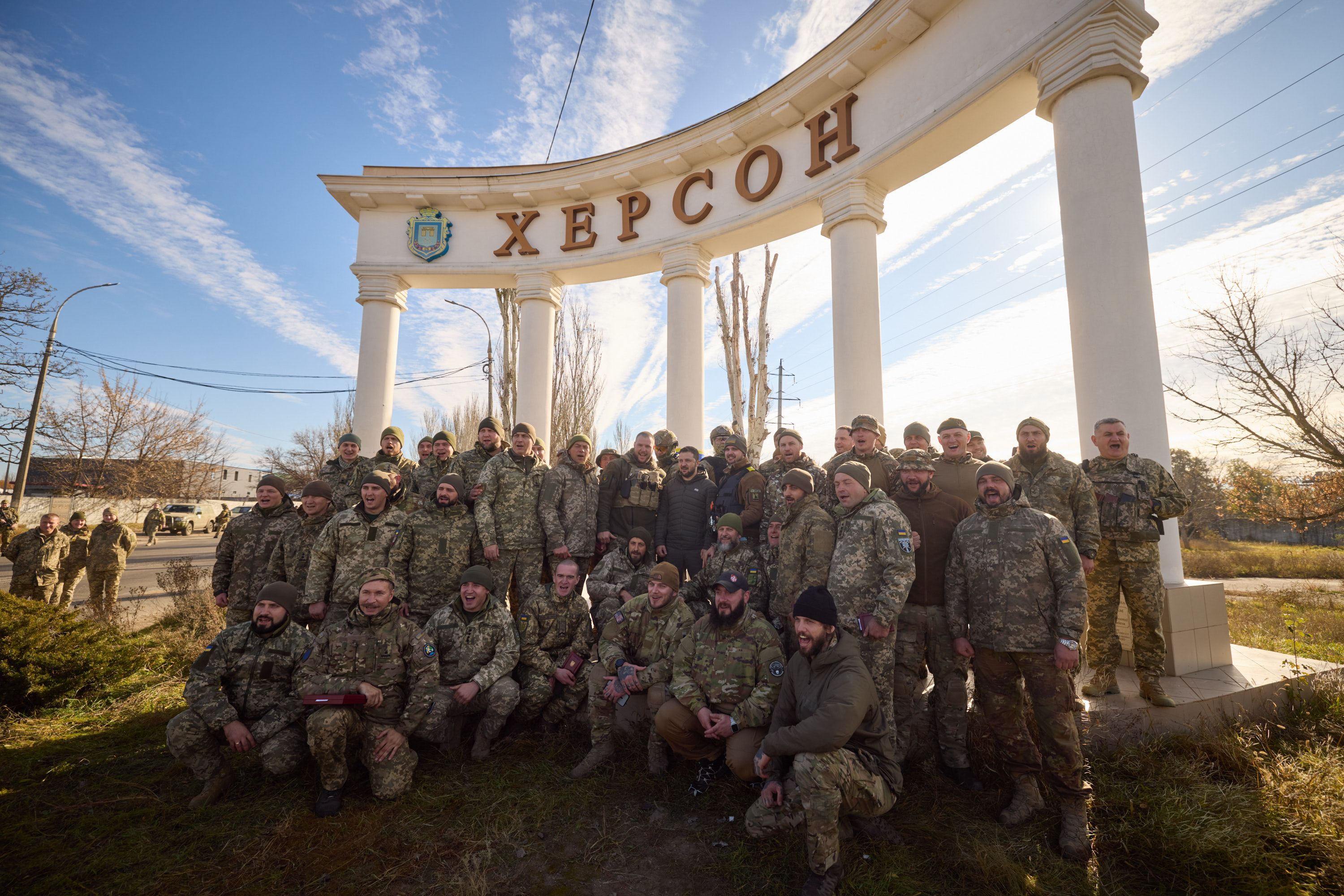
Ukrainian President Volodymyr Zelenskyy with soldiers who distinguished themselves during the liberation of Kherson

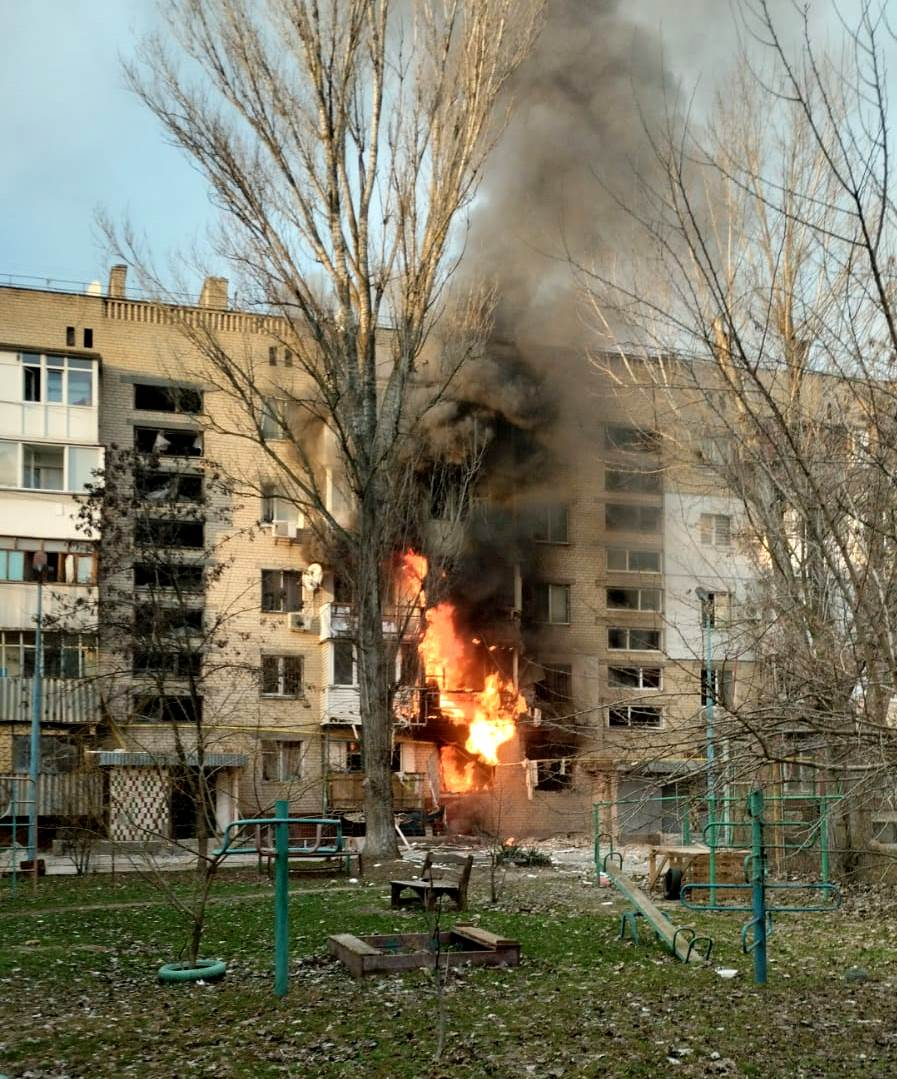
Kherson after shelling by the Russian army on 15 January 2023

On 3 June, the EU stated that it would not recognize any Russian passports issued to Ukrainian citizens in the Kherson and Zaporizhzhia regions. On 11 June, according to local officials, the first Russian passports were handed out to citizens in Kherson and Zaporizhzhia Region, including local officials such as Vladimir Saldo.

On 24 June, Dmytro Savluchenko, who led the Directorate for Family, Youth, and Sports of the Russian occupation administration, was killed by a car bomb.

On 29 June 2022, Stremousov said that "The Kherson region will decide to join the Russian Federation and become a full-fledged subject as one unified state." On the same visit, Kiriyenko spoke at the United Russia party's humanitarian aid center in Kherson: "The Kherson region's admission into Russia will be complete, similar to Crimea," recalling the 2014 Crimean status referendum. That same day, the Ukrainian mayor of Kherson, Ihor Kolykhaiev, was detained by Russian security forces.

On 5 July, Volodymyr Saldo announced that the former deputy head of government in the Russian exclave of Kaliningrad Sergei Yeliseyev, a graduate of the FSB Academy, was to assume the presidency of the oblast.

=== Annexation by Russia and Ukrainian recapture of Kherson City ===
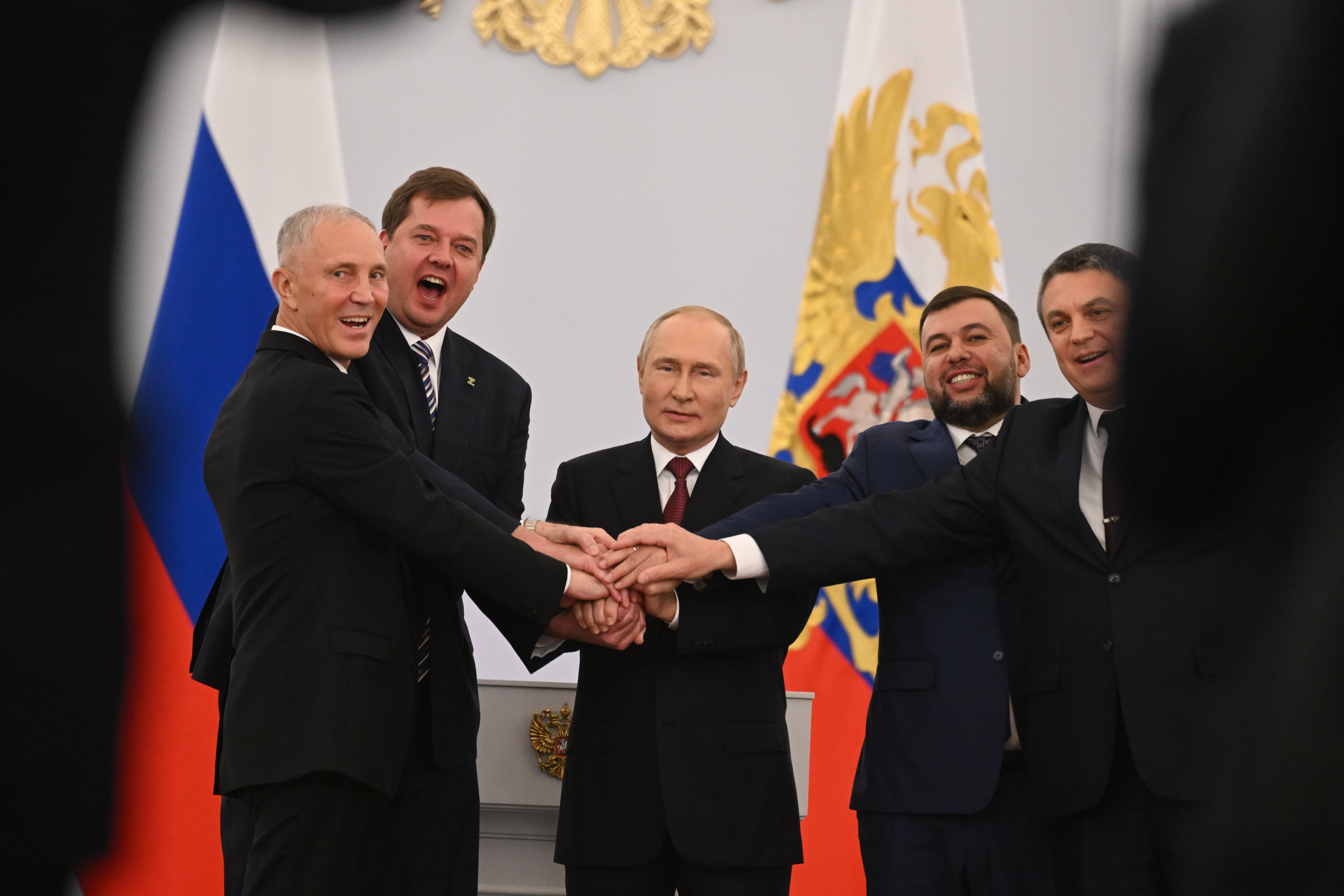
Vladimir Putin celebrating the annexations with Russian-installed leaders of the occupied regions on 30 September 2022

On 10 July, Iryna Vereshchuk, the Deputy Prime Minister of Ukraine urged civilians in the Kherson region to evacuate ahead of a future Ukrainian counteroffensive. On 27 July 2022 the surface of a section of the Antonivka Road Bridge was rendered unusable for heavy equipment, by M142 HIMARS attacks. The counteroffensive eventually was announced to have begun on 29 August 2022. They regained territory and liberated villages in northern Kherson Oblast and southern Mykolaiv Oblast gradually throughout September.

On 28 August 2022, the vice-president of the occupation administration (Kovalev) was found shot dead inside his own apartment in Zaliznyi Port. His wife was stabbed in the same attack and she died later in the hospital.

On 30 September 2022, Russia declared it was annexing four Ukrainian oblasts, including Kherson Oblast. The annexation was unrecognized by the international community, with the exception of North Korea and Syria. The United Nations General Assembly passed a resolution calling on countries not to recognise what it described as an "attempted illegal annexation" and demanded that Russia "immediately, completely and unconditionally withdraw."

In early October 2022, the Russian defensive lines in the northern parts of the oblast collapsed, leading to more Ukrainian progress. Ukrainian officials said about 1,200 km^{2} of territory had been recaptured since late August. Deputy head of the Kherson Military-Civilian Administration Kirill Stremousov died in a car crash near Henichesk on 9 November 2022. On 11 November, Ukrainian forces took back the city of Kherson. Following the loss of Kherson in November 2022, the Russian occupation force moved its temporary administrative centre to Henichesk. Kremlin spokesman Dmitry Peskov told reporters that the status of the Kherson region as a "subject of the Russian Federation" remained "unchanged" despite the withdrawal.

After being reported missing by her husband Pavel Gubarev, on 16 November 2022 Russian media reported that Ekaterina Gubareva, another deputy head of the administration, had been detained by the Russian police in relation to a corruption case involving embezzlement of public funds and suspended from her current position. Pavel Gubarev later announced on 18 November that Gubareva had been released, without offering further details.

=== Destruction of the Kakhovka Dam ===
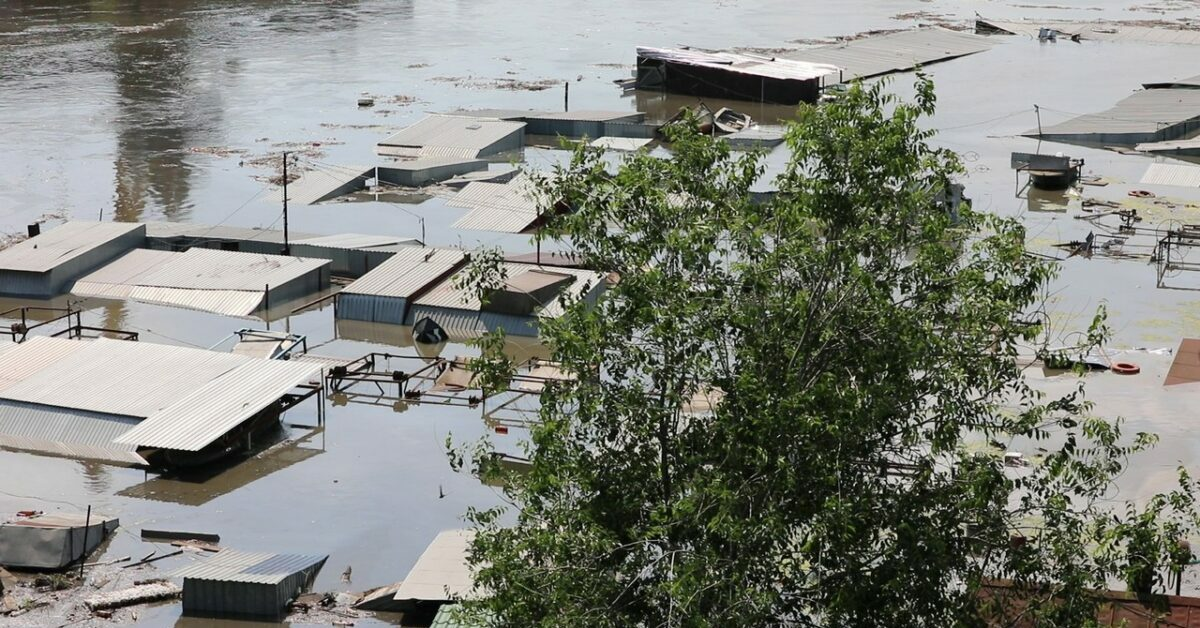
Flooding in Kherson Oblast downstream of the Kakhovka Dam

In June 2023, the Kakhovka Dam, which was under the control of Russia, was breached, flooding vast swathes of land along the Dnieper river. Many experts have concluded that Russian forces likely blew up a segment of the dam.

The consequences of the destruction of the dam are expected to become a long-term environmental disaster. According to a regional official, the death toll due to flooding had reached 29 in Russian-occupied portions of the oblast as of June 17. On 18 June, the United Nations condemned Russia for refusing to allow humanitarian access to the occupied flood-affected areas, with the UN humanitarian coordinator for Ukraine Denise Brown saying "We urge the Russian authorities to act in accordance with their obligations under international humanitarian law." Russian authorities said that their decision was motivated by unspecified "security concerns".

== Government and politics ==
=== Administration ===
The governor and the prime minister are in charge of the administration, including (as of August 2025) :

Name	Position
Vladimir Saldo	Governor
Vladimir Bespalov	Deputy Governor
Pavel Shuvalkin	First Deputy Governor
Denis Maslyakov	Deputy Governor, head of Governor's administration and of the government of Kherson Oblast
Tatyana Kuzmich	Deputy Governor
Andrey Alekseyenko	Prime Minister
Vitaly Bulyuk	First Deputy Prime Minister for Finance and Economy
Semyon Mashkautsan	Deputy Prime Minister (since August 17, 2022)
Sergey Cherevko	Deputy Prime Minister for Social Policy

=== Administrative divisions ===
On 5 August 2022, the occupation administration switched to using the old pre-2020 reform divisions of Kherson Oblast established in the USSR, with 18 districts rather than the modern five.

On 17 August, they added two urban districts around Kherson city and Nova Kakhovka. On 21 September, areas of occupied Mykolaiv Oblast were incorporated into the Kherson administration as two new municipal districts: Snigirevsky District – another former raion abolished in 2020 – and the new Aleksandrovsky District centered in the village of Oleksandrivka in Mykolaiv Oblast. By 11 November 2022, after the Ukrainian military counteroffensive, local Ukrainian officials said that the entire Mykolaiv Oblast except for the Kinburn Peninsula had been retaken.

In total, the oblast has 2 cities of oblast significance and 20 districts. The cities are Kherson and Novaya Kakhovka. The districts are: Aleksandrovka, (Note: This district is part of Mykolaiv Oblast in the Ukrainian administrative divisions) Alyoshky, Belozyorka, Beryslav, Velykaya Alexandrovka, Velykaya Lepetykha, Verkhnii Rogachyk, Vysokopolye, Genichesk, Golaya Prystan, Gornostayevka, Ivanovka, Kalanchak, Kakhovka, Nizhnye Serogozy, Novovorontsovka, Novotroitskoye, Skadovsk, Snigiryovka, and Chaplynka.

No.	Original districts					
No.	Flag	Coat of Arms	Name	Heads as of 2025	Control	
1			Aleshkinsky Municipal District	Ruslan Khomenko	Russia	
2	N/A	N/A	Belozersky Municipal District	N/A	Ukraine	
3	N/A	N/A	Berislavsky Municipal District	N/A	Ukraine	
4	N/A	N/A	Velikoaleksandrovsky Municipal District	N/A	Ukraine	
5			Velikolepetikhsky Municipal District	Olga Baranovskaya	Russia	
6	N/A	N/A	Verkhnerogachiksky Municipal District	Vitaly Vasyutinsky	Russia	
7	N/A	N/A	Vysokopolsky Municipal District	N/A	Ukraine	
8			Genichesky Municipal District	Yulia Semyakina	Russia	
9			Golopristansky Municipal District	Vitaly Titarenko	Russia	
10			Gornostayevsky Municipal District	Yuri Turulev	Russia	
11	N/A		Ivanovsky Municipal District	Alexey Malenkin	Russia	
12	N/A		Kalanchaksky Municipal District	Galina Yanoshevna	Russia	
13			Kakhovsky Municipal District	Pavel Filipchuk	Russia	
14			Nizhneserogozsky Municipal District	Vladislav Nikitenko	Russia	
15	N/A	N/A	Novovorontsovsky Municipal District		Ukraine	
16			Novotroitsky District	Evgeniya Kuzmenko	Russia	
17			Skadovsky Municipal District	Alexander Dudka	Russia	
18			Chaplynsky Municipal District	Liliya Pulyaeva	Russia	
No.	Later added					
No.	Flag	Coat of arms	Name	Heads as of 2025	Date added	Control
19	N/A	N/A	Khersonsky Urban District	N/A	17 August 2022	Ukraine
20	N/A	N/A	Novokakhovsky Urban District	Vladimir Oganesov (acting)	17 August 2022	Russia
21	N/A	N/A	Snigirevsky Municipal District	N/A	21 September 2022	Ukraine
22	N/A	N/A	Aleksandrovsky Municipal District	N/A	21 September 2022	Ukraine

=== Elections ===
Voters in Russian controlled parts of Kherson were encouraged to vote in the 2024 Russian presidential election. For the 2026 Russian legislative elections to the State Duma, a separate Kherson single‑mandate electoral district (No.187) was created. After the September election, Yelena Dmitruk was declared the winner by the Russian Central Election Commission.

== Human rights ==
=== Censorship and internet restrictions ===
On 21 July 2022, it was reported that a then-recent Russian decree had extended Russian 2022 war censorship laws to the Kherson oblast, with deportation to Russia included as a punishment for infringement.

A few weeks after taking over Kherson city, Russian soldiers seized the offices of local internet service providers and took control of the networks, rerouting data through Russian networks. Under the occupation regime, the social media sites Facebook, Instagram and Twitter were blocked, as well as Ukrainian and other news websites.

=== Sexual violence ===
As the 2022 Kherson counteroffensive liberated much of northern Kherson Oblast, Ukrainian investigation teams uncovered "widespread evidence" of sexual abuse by Russian occupation forces against the population of the region. By 3 November 2022, Ukrainian investigators had documented six alleged cases of sexual assault in newly liberated regions.

=== Torture and abduction of civilians by Russian forces ===
Dementiy Bilyi, head of the Kherson regional department of the Committee of Voters of Ukraine, said that the Russian security forces were "beating, torturing, and kidnapping" civilians in the Kherson Oblast of Ukraine. He added that eyewitnesses had described "dozens" of arbitrary searches and detentions, resulting in an unknown number of abducted persons. At least 400 residents had gone missing by 16 March, with the mayor and deputy mayor of the town of Skadovsk being allegedly abducted by armed men. An allegedly leaked letter described Russian plans to unleash a "great terror" to suppress protests occurring in Kherson, stating that people would "have to be taken from their homes in the middle of the night".

Ukrainians who escaped from occupied Kherson into Ukrainian-controlled territory provided testimonies of torture, abuse and kidnapping by Russian forces in the region. One person, from Bilozerka in Kherson Oblast, provided physical evidence of being tortured by Russians and described beatings, electrocutions, mock executions, strangulations, threats to kill family members and other forms of torture.

An investigation by BBC News gathered evidence of torture, which in addition to beatings also included electrocution and burns on people's hands and feet. A doctor who treated victims of torture in the region reported: "Some of the worst were burn marks on genitals, a gunshot wound to the head of a girl who was raped and burns from an iron on a patient's back and stomach. A patient told me two wires from a car battery were attached to his groin and he was told to stand on a wet rag". In addition to the BBC, Human Rights Watch and the United Nations Human Rights Monitoring Mission in Ukraine have reported on torture and disappearances carried out by Russian occupation forces in the region. One resident stated: "In Kherson, now people go missing all the time (...) there is a war going on, only this part is without bombs."

Kherson's elected Ukrainian mayor compiled a list of more than 300 people who had been kidnapped by Russian forces as of 15 May 2022. According to The Times, in the building housing the Russian occupation authorities, the screams of the tortured can be frequently heard throughout the corridors.

According to The Washington Post, by 15 April 824 graves had been dug at Kherson's cemetery.

On 22 July 2022, Human Rights Watch reported that Russian forces had tortured, unlawfully detained, and forcibly disappeared civilians in the occupied areas of Kherson and Zaporizhzhia regions. The purpose of the abuse seemed to be to obtain information and to instil fear so that people would accept the occupation, as Russia seeks to assert sovereignty over occupied territory in violation of international law.

== Resistance to occupation ==
=== Protests ===
On 5 March, residents of Kherson went to a rally with Ukrainian flags and chanted that the city was still Ukrainian and would never be Russian, despite Russian occupation. The Russian military opened warning fire against the protesters. At the same time, the National Police of Ukraine published a video where a Kherson police officer, holding a Ukrainian flag in his hands, jumped onto a Russian armored personnel carrier that was driving past the rally, and local residents supported his action with shouts and applause.

On 7 March, the Kherson Regional Prosecutor's Office of Ukraine, on the basis of Part 2 of Article 438 of the Criminal Code of Ukraine (violation of the laws and customs of war, associated with premeditated murder), opened a criminal case into the death of several protesters in Nova Kakhovka. According to the investigation, during a rally on 6 March, the Russian military opened fire on protesters indiscriminately "despite the fact that people were unarmed and did not pose any threat," resulting in at least one death and seven injuries.

On 20 March, protesters in Kherson confronted several Russian military vehicles and told them to "go home". New rallies against the occupation happened on 11 and 27 April, both of which were violently dispersed by Russian occupation forces and separatist militias, killing four people in the process. The Woodrow Wilson International Center for Scholars reports that medical workers in Kherson refused to go to work, in order to boycott Russian occupation forces and not treat their injured.

=== Partisan resistance ===
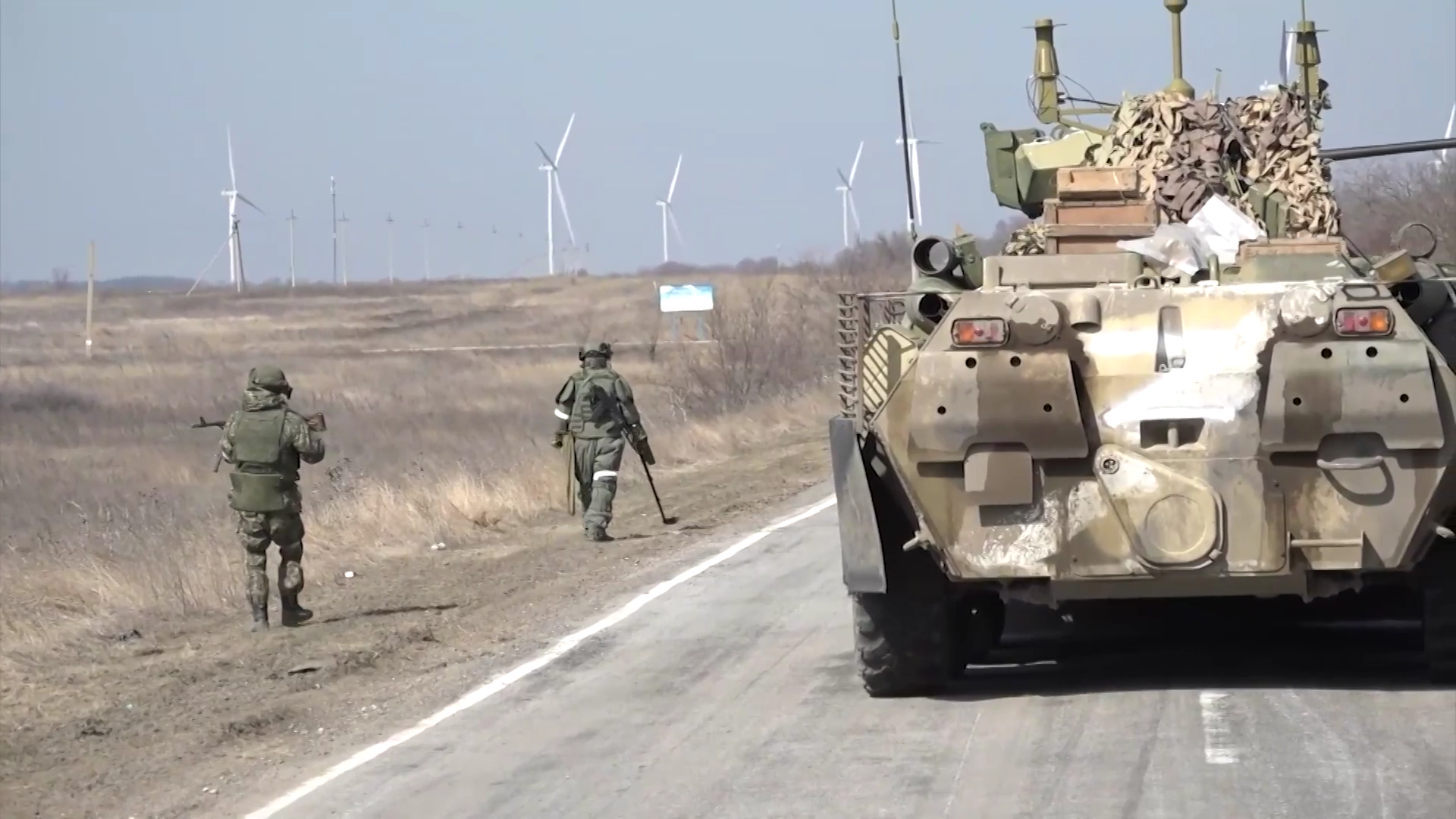
Russian engineer troops in Kherson, March 2022

According to Nezavisimaya Gazeta, the activities of the Russian-installed Salvation Committee for Peace and Order encounter constant resistance among the population, and a number of its members were killed by Chief Directorate of Intelligence (GUR) or Ukrainian partisans. Newsweek also reports that two local high-profile pro-Russian figures were shot dead in Kherson by the Ukrainian resistance.

Guided by contacts in Ukrainian security services, many ordinary citizens in Kherson City formed "a grass-roots resistance movement", becoming anti-occupation partisans. They secretly took videos of Russian forces and sent them to the Ukrainian army along with corresponding coordinates, circulated weaponry throughout the city, and even killed Russian soldiers at night, creating an atmosphere of "fear and paranoia" among the occupation forces.

On 20 April 2022, regional media from Odesa reported that pro-Russian blogger Valery Kuleshov had been killed by Ukrainian partisans in Kherson.

On 6 August, deputy head of the Russian administration in Nova Kakhovka, Vitaly Gura, was shot dead in his home. In September 2022, information emerged that Gura's assassination had been faked by the FSB.

People's Deputy of Ukraine Oleksii Kovalov, who had been accused by Ukrainian authorities of collaborating with Russian forces since early July by taking the position of deputy head of the Russian-installed Kherson Oblast government, was shot dead in his own home on 29 August 2022.

== Control of settlements ==
Map showing territorial control in Kherson Oblast

Name	Pop.	Raion	Held by	As of	More information
Arkhanhelske	1,769	Beryslav	Ukraine	3 Oct 2022	Captured by Russia in March 2022. Recaptured by Ukraine on 2 October 2022.
Beryslav	12,123	Beryslav	Ukraine	30 Mar 2022	Captured by Russia on 27 February 2022. Recaptured by Ukraine in November 2022.
Bilohrudove	275	Skadovsk	Russia	20 May 2024	Contested by Ukraine between around 30 November – 3 December 2023.
Blahodatne	1,008	Kherson	Ukraine	14 Sep 2022	Controlled by Ukraine, according to a Ukrainian military journalist.
Borozenske	2,021	Beryslav	Ukraine	10 Nov 2022	Captured by Russia in 2022. Recaptured by Ukraine on 10 November 2022.
Chaplynka	9,539	Kakhovka	Russia	27 Apr 2022	Captured by Russia in 2022.
Chornobaivka	9,275	Kherson	Ukraine	27 Mar 2022	See 2022 Chornobaivka attacks Captured by Russia on 27 February 2022. Recaptured by Ukraine on 11 November.
Chulakivka	3,087	Skadovsk	Russia	15 Mar 2022	Captured by Russia on 15 March 2022.
Davydiv Brid	1,223	Beryslav	Ukraine	4 Oct 2022	See Battle of Davydiv Brid; Captured by Russia in March 2022. Recaptured by Ukraine on 4 October 2022.
Dudchany	2,102	Beryslav	Ukraine	4 Oct 2022	
Havrylivka	1,487	Beryslav	Ukraine	4 Oct 2022	
Henichesk	19,253	Henichesk	Russia	19 Apr 2022	Captured by Russia on 24 February 2022.
Kakhovka	35,400	Kakhovka	Russia	6 Sep 2022	Captured by Russia in February 2022.
Kalynivske	1,075	Beryslav	Ukraine	9 Nov 2022	Captured by Russia on 27 April 2022. Recaptured by Ukraine on 9 November 2022.
Kherson	283,649	Kherson	Ukraine	11 Nov 2022	See Battle of Kherson and Liberation of Kherson; Captured by Russia on 1 March 2022. Recaptured by Ukraine on 11 November 2022.
Kozachi Laheri	3,726	Kherson	Russia	10 Aug 2023	
Krynky	991	Kherson	Russia	19 Jul 2024	Captured by Russia in 2022. Contested by Ukraine between around 19 October 2023 – 17 July 2024. Recaptured by Russia around 18 July 2024.
Kyselivka	2,466	Kherson	Ukraine	10 Nov 2022	Recaptured by Ukraine 10 November 2022.
Liubymivka	1,695	Beryslav	Ukraine	2 Oct 2022	Captured by Russia in March 2022. Recaptured by Ukraine on 2 October 2022.
Mykhailivka	1,020	Beryslav	Ukraine	3 Oct 2022	
Nova Kakhovka	45,069	Kakhovka	Russia	27 Feb 2022	Captured by Russia on 24 February 2022.
Novooleksandrivka	1,335	Beryslav	Ukraine	3 Oct 2022	Captured by Russia in 2022. Recaptured by Ukraine on 3 October 2022.
Novoraisk	2,376	Beryslav	Ukraine	27 Apr 2022	Captured by Russia on 27 April 2022. Recaptured by Ukraine on 10 November 2022.
Novovorontsovka	6,081	Beryslav	Ukraine	27 Apr 2022	
Oleksandrivka	2,596	Kherson	Ukraine	10 Nov 2022	Captured by Russia on 17 April 2022. Recaptured by Ukraine on 10 November 2022.
Oleshky	24,383	Kherson	Russia	24 Feb 2022	Captured by Russia on 24 February 2022.
Osokorivka	2,747	Beryslav	Ukraine	6 Apr 2022	
Pishchanivka	582	Kherson	Russia	19 Oct 2023	Captured by Russia in 2022. Contested by Ukraine between 17 and 19 October 2023.
Poima	117	Kherson	Russia	19 Oct 2023	Captured by Russia in 2022. Recaptured by Ukraine on 17 October 2023. Recaptured by Russia on 18 October 2023.
Posad-Pokrovske	2,349	Kherson	Ukraine	21 Mar 2022	Captured by Russia on 9 March 2022. Recaptured by Ukraine on 21 March 2022.
Pravdyne	1,621	Kherson	Ukraine	9 Nov 2022	Captured by Russia in 2022. Recaptured by Ukraine on 9 November 2022.
Skadovsk	17,344	Skadovsk	Russia	13 Mar 2022	Captured by Russia on 9 March 2022.
Sokolohirne	709	Henichesk	Russia	15 Oct 2022	Captured by Russia on 25 February 2022.
Stanislav	4,909	Kherson	Ukraine	10 Nov 2022	Captured by Russia in March 2022. Recaptured by Ukraine on 10 November 2022.
Tiahynka	2,031	Beryslav	Ukraine	27 Apr 2022	Captured by Russia in 2022. Recaptured by Ukraine on 10 November.
Velyka Oleksandrivka	6,487	Beryslav	Ukraine	4 Oct 2022	Captured by Russia on 10 March 2022. Recaptured by Ukraine on 4 October 2022.
Vysokopillia	3,899	Beryslav	Ukraine	4 Sep 2022	Captured by Russia on 16 March 2022. Recaptured by Ukraine on 4 September 2022.
Zolota Balka	1,681	Beryslav	Ukraine	3 Aug 2022	Recaptured by Ukraine on 2 October 2022.

== See also ==
- Outline of the Russo-Ukrainian war
- Russian-occupied territories of Ukraine (former occupation marked in italics)
  - Russian occupation of Crimea
  - Russian occupation of Chernihiv Oblast
  - Russian occupation of Donetsk Oblast
  - Russian occupation of Dnipropetrovsk Oblast
  - Russian occupation of Kharkiv Oblast
  - Russian occupation of Kyiv Oblast
  - Russian occupation of Luhansk Oblast
  - Russian occupation of Mykolaiv Oblast
  - Russian occupation of Sumy Oblast
  - Russian occupation of Zaporizhzhia Oblast
  - Russian occupation of Zhytomyr Oblast
  - Snake Island campaign
- Russian annexation of Crimea
- Russian annexation of Donetsk, Kherson, Luhansk and Zaporizhzhia oblasts
- 2022 protests in Russian-occupied Ukraine
- Collaboration with Russia during the Russo-Ukrainian war (2022–present)
- Ukrainian resistance in Russian-occupied Ukraine
