= Administrative divisions of Kherson Oblast =

Kherson Oblast is subdivided into five districts (raions) which are subdivided into territorial communities (hromadas).

== Current ==
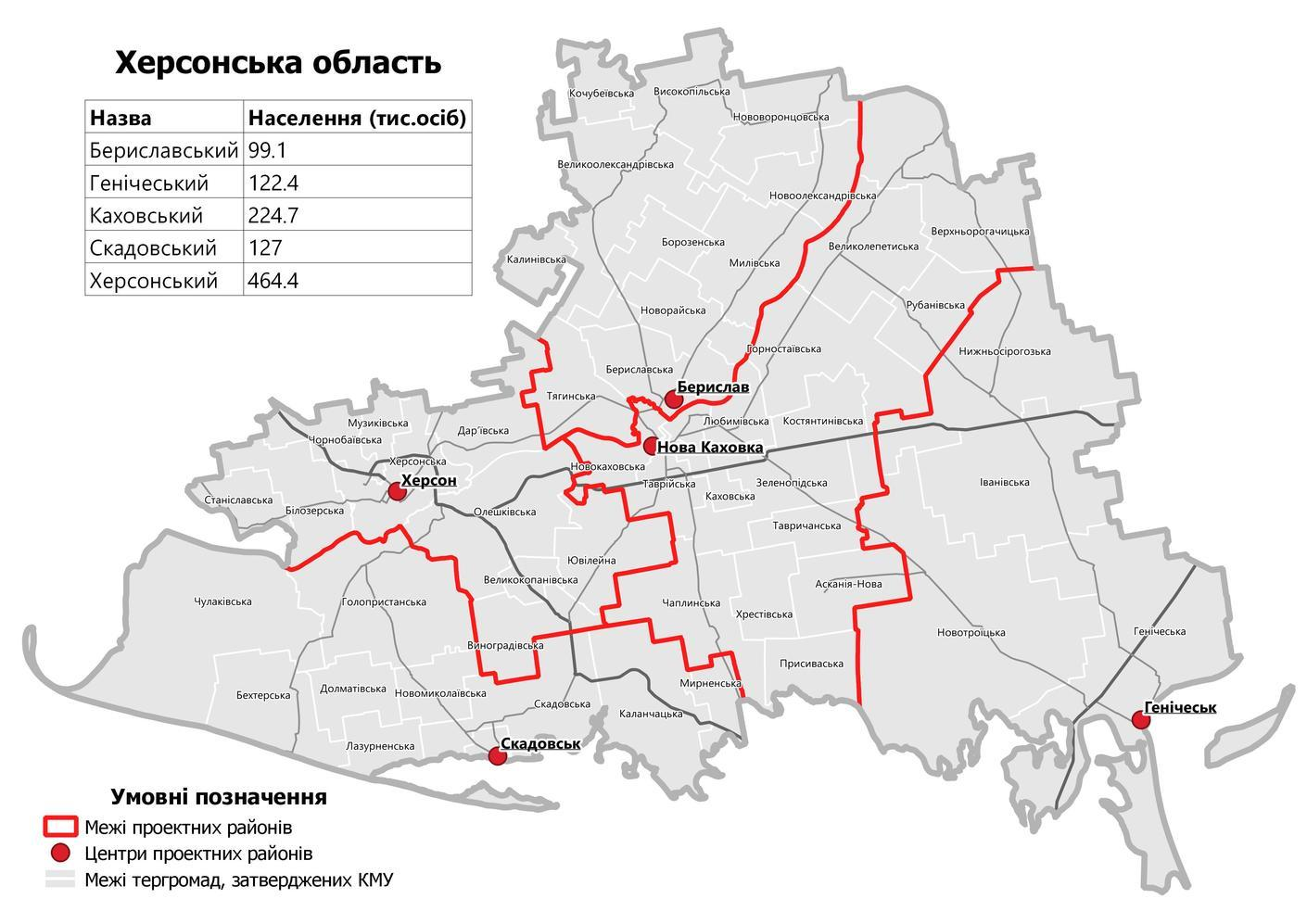
Raions of Kherson Oblast as of August 2020.

On 18 July 2020, the number of districts was reduced from eighteen to five (which now also includes the four former city municipalities). These are:

1. Beryslav (Бериславський район), the center is in the city of Beryslav;
2. Henichesk (Генічеський район), the center is in the city of Henichesk;
3. Kakhovka (Каховський район), the center is in the city of Nova Kakhovka;
4. Kherson (Херсонський район), the center is in the city of Kherson;
5. Skadovsk (Скадовський район), the center is in the city of Skadovsk.

Kherson Oblast
As of January 1, 2022
Number of districts (райони)	5
Number of hromadas (громади)	49

== Administrative divisions until 2020 ==
Raions of Kherson Oblast as of June 2020. The city of Kherson is shown in dark blue.

Before July 2020, Kherson Oblast was subdivided into 22 regions: 18 districts (raions) and 4 city municipalities (mis'krada or misto), officially known as territories governed by city councils.

- Cities under the oblast's jurisdiction:
  - Kherson Municipality
    - Cities under the city's jurisdiction:
      - Kherson (Херсон), the administrative center of the oblast
    - Urban-type settlements under the city's jurisdiction:
      - Antonivka (Антонівка)
      - Komyshany (Комишани)
      - Naddniprianske (Наддніпрянське)
      - Zelenivka (Зеленівка)
  - Hola Prystan Municipality
    - Cities under the city's jurisdiction:
      - Hola Prystan (Гола Пристань)
  - Kakhovka (Каховка)
  - Nova Kakhovka Municipality
    - Cities under the city's jurisdiction:
      - Nova Kakhovka (Нова Каховка)
      - Tavriisk (Таврійськ)
    - Urban-type settlements under the city's jurisdiction:
      - Dnipriany (Дніпряни)
- Districts (raions):
  - Beryslav (Бериславський район)
    - Cities under the district's jurisdiction:
      - Beryslav (Берислав)
    - Urban-type settlements under the district's jurisdiction:
      - Kozatske (Козацьке)
  - Bilozerka (Білозерський район)
    - Urban-type settlements under the district's jurisdiction:
      - Bilozerka (Білозерка)
  - Chaplynka (Чаплинський район)
    - Urban-type settlements under the district's jurisdiction:
      - Askania-Nova (Асканія-Нова)
      - Chaplynka (Чаплинка)
  - Henichesk (Генічеський район)
    - Cities under the district's jurisdiction:
      - Henichesk (Генічеськ)
    - Urban-type settlements under the district's jurisdiction:
      - Novooleksiivka (Новоолексіївка)
      - Rykove (Рикове), formerly Partyzany
  - Hola Prystan (Голопристанський район)
  - Hornostaivka (Горностаївський район)
    - Urban-type settlements under the district's jurisdiction:
      - Hornostaivka (Горностаївка)
  - Ivanivka (Іванівський район)
    - Urban-type settlements under the district's jurisdiction:
      - Ivanivka (Іванівка)
  - Kakhovka (Каховський район)
    - Urban-type settlements under the district's jurisdiction:
      - Liubymivka (Любимівка)
  - Kalanchak (Каланчацький район)
    - Urban-type settlements under the district's jurisdiction:
      - Kalanchak (Каланчак)
      - Myrne (Мирне)
  - Nyzhni Sirohozy (Нижньосірогозький район)
    - Urban-type settlements under the district's jurisdiction:
      - Nyzhni Sirohozy (Нижні Сірогози)
  - Novotroitske (Новотроїцький район)
    - Urban-type settlements under the district's jurisdiction:
      - Novotroitske (Новотроїцьке)
      - Syvaske (Сиваське)
  - Novovorontsovka (Нововоронцовський район)
    - Urban-type settlements under the district's jurisdiction:
      - Novovorontsovka (Нововоронцовка)
  - Oleshky (Олешківський), formerly Tsiurupynsk Raion
    - Cities under the district's jurisdiction:
      - Oleshky (Олешки), formerly Tsiurupynsk
    - Urban-type settlements under the district's jurisdiction:
      - Brylivka (Брилівка)
      - Nova Maiachka (Нова Маячка)
  - Skadovsk (Скадовський район)
    - Cities under the district's jurisdiction:
      - Skadovsk (Скадовськ)
    - Urban-type settlements under the district's jurisdiction:
      - Lazurne (Лазурне)
  - Velyka Lepetykha (Великолепетиський район)
    - Urban-type settlements under the district's jurisdiction:
      - Velyka Lepetykha (Велика Лепетиха)
  - Velyka Oleksandrivka (Великоолександрівський район)
    - Urban-type settlements under the district's jurisdiction:
      - Bila Krynytsia (Біла Криниця)
      - Kalynivske (Калинівське), formerly Kalininske
      - Karierne (Кар'єрне)
      - Velyka Oleksandrivka (Велика Олександрівка)
  - Verkhniy Rohachyk (Верхньорогачицький район)
    - Urban-type settlements under the district's jurisdiction:
      - Verkhnii Rohachyk (Верхній Рогачик)
  - Vysokopillia (Високопільський район)
    - Urban-type settlements under the district's jurisdiction:
      - Arkhanhelske (Архангельське)
      - Vysokopillia (Високопілля)
