= Syvaske =

Rural locality in Kherson Oblast, Ukraine

Syvaske Сиваське
- Rural settlement
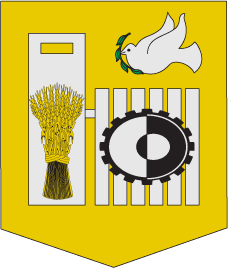
- Coat of arms

- Location in Kherson Oblast Location in Ukraine
- Country: Ukraine
- Oblast: Kherson Oblast
- Raion: Henichesk Raion
- Hromada: Novotroitske settlement hromada

Population (2022)
  - Total: ▼4,068
- Time zone: UTC+2 (EET)
  - Summer (DST): UTC+3 (EEST)

Syvaske (Ukrainian: Сиваське; Russian: Сивашское) is a rural settlement in Henichesk Raion, Kherson Oblast, southern Ukraine. It is located in the steppe, about 20 kilometres (12 mi) from Lake Syvash. Syvaske belongs to Novotroitske settlement hromada, one of the hromadas of Ukraine. Until 1935, it was called Rozhdestvenskoye. Population: 4,068 (2022 estimate).

== History ==
Until 18 July 2020, Syvaske belonged to Novotroitske Raion. The raion was abolished in July 2020 as part of the administrative reform of Ukraine, which reduced the number of raions of Kherson Oblast to five. The area of Novotroitske Raion was merged into Henichesk Raion.

Until 26 January 2024, Syvaske was designated urban-type settlement. On this day, a new law entered into force which abolished this status, and Syvaske became a rural settlement.

== Economy ==
=== Transportation ===
The closest railway station is Partyzany, about 10 kilometres (6.2 mi) east. It is on the line connecting Melitopol with Henichesk and Syvash. There is infrequent passenger traffic. The railway used to continue to Dzhankoi and Simferopol, but after the Russian annexation of Crimea in 2014, the traffic to Crimea was discontinued.

The settlement has access to Highway M18 which runs north to Melitopol and Zaporizhzhia and south to the border with Crimea.

== See also ==
- Russian occupation of Kherson Oblast
