= List of cities in Kherson Oblast =

Location of cities in Kherson Oblast, with red dots indicating Russian-occupied cities and green dots indicating Ukrainian-controlled cities.

There are nine populated places in Kherson Oblast, Ukraine, that have been officially granted city status (Ukrainian: місто, romanized: misto) by the Verkhovna Rada, the country's parliament. Settlements with more than 10,000 people are eligible for city status, although the status is also granted to settlements of historical or regional importance. As of 5 December 2001, the date of the first and only official census in the country since independence, (Note: As of 11 July 2023) the most populous city in the oblast was the regional capital, Kherson, with a population of 328,360 people, while the least populous city was Tavriisk, with 11,452 people. Following the passing of decommunization laws, one city within the oblast, Oleshky, was renamed in 2016 from its previous name, Tsiurupynsk, for its connection with people, places, events, and organizations associated with the Soviet Union. (Note: Following the occupation of Oleshky by Russian forces, de facto Russian-appointed officials reverted to the pre-2016 name of the city.) Prior to 2020, four cities in the oblast were designated as cities of regional significance (municipalities), which had self-government under city councils, while the oblast's remaining five cities were located amongst the oblast's eighteen raions (districts) as cities of district significance, which are subordinated to the governments of the raions. On 18 July 2020, an administrative reform abolished and merged the oblast's raions and cities of regional significance into five new, expanded raions. (Note: After the occupation of most of the oblast's territory during Russia's full-scale invasion of Ukraine, de facto Russian-appointed officials imposed the use of the pre-2020 reform administrative divisions in the oblast. On 21 September 2022, Russian officials added the then-occupied areas of Ukraine's Mykolaiv Oblast to the Russian occupation administration of Kherson Oblast, with the then-occupied parts of Mykolaiv Oblast being divided between the recreated Snihurivka Raion (one of Mykolaiv Oblast's pre-2020 raions) and the newly created Aleksandrovsky Raion, centered on the village of Oleksandrivka (known in Russian as Aleksandrovka). Following the 2022 Kherson counteroffensive, Ukrainian officials regained control of parts of Kherson and Mykolaiv Oblasts located west of the Dnipro river while territory in Kherson Oblast east of the river and in Mykolaiv Oblast's Kinburn Peninsula remain under Russian occupation. Since Ukrainian forces recovered Kherson city on 11 November 2022, Kherson Oblast's Russian occupation administration has been based from Henichesk, although Russian officials still claim Kherson as the capital of the oblast's Russian administration.) The five raions that now make up the oblast are Beryslav, Henichesk, Kakhovka, Kherson, and Skadovsk.

After 24 February 2022, during Russia's full-scale invasion of Ukraine, all cities in the oblast were occupied by Russian troops, including the capital, Kherson, making it the only regional capital to be captured during the invasion. Following the 2022 Kherson counteroffensive, the oblast's territory to the west of the Dnipro river, including the cities of Beryslav and Kherson, was recovered by Ukraine, while the oblast's seven cities to the east of the river have remained occupied by Russian forces. For its contributions to the country's defense during the invasion, Kherson was awarded the honorary title Hero City of Ukraine in 2022. The destruction of the Kakhovka Dam on 6 June 2023 heavily impacted the region, with cities along the banks of the Dnipro downriver from the breached dam (Hola Prystan, Kherson, Nova Kakhovka, and Oleshky) experiencing flooding.

== List of cities ==
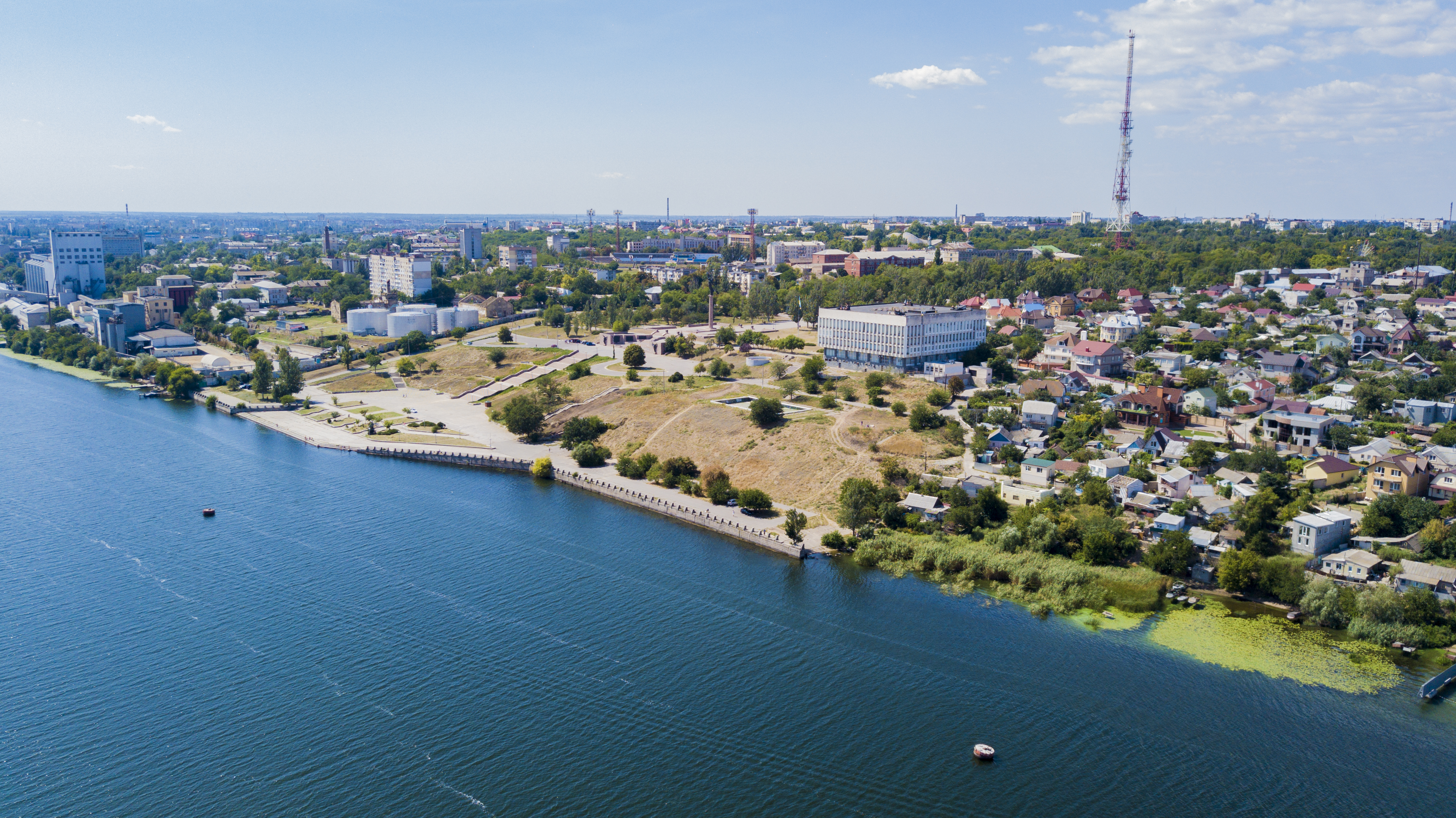
Kherson, capital and most populous city in Kherson Oblast

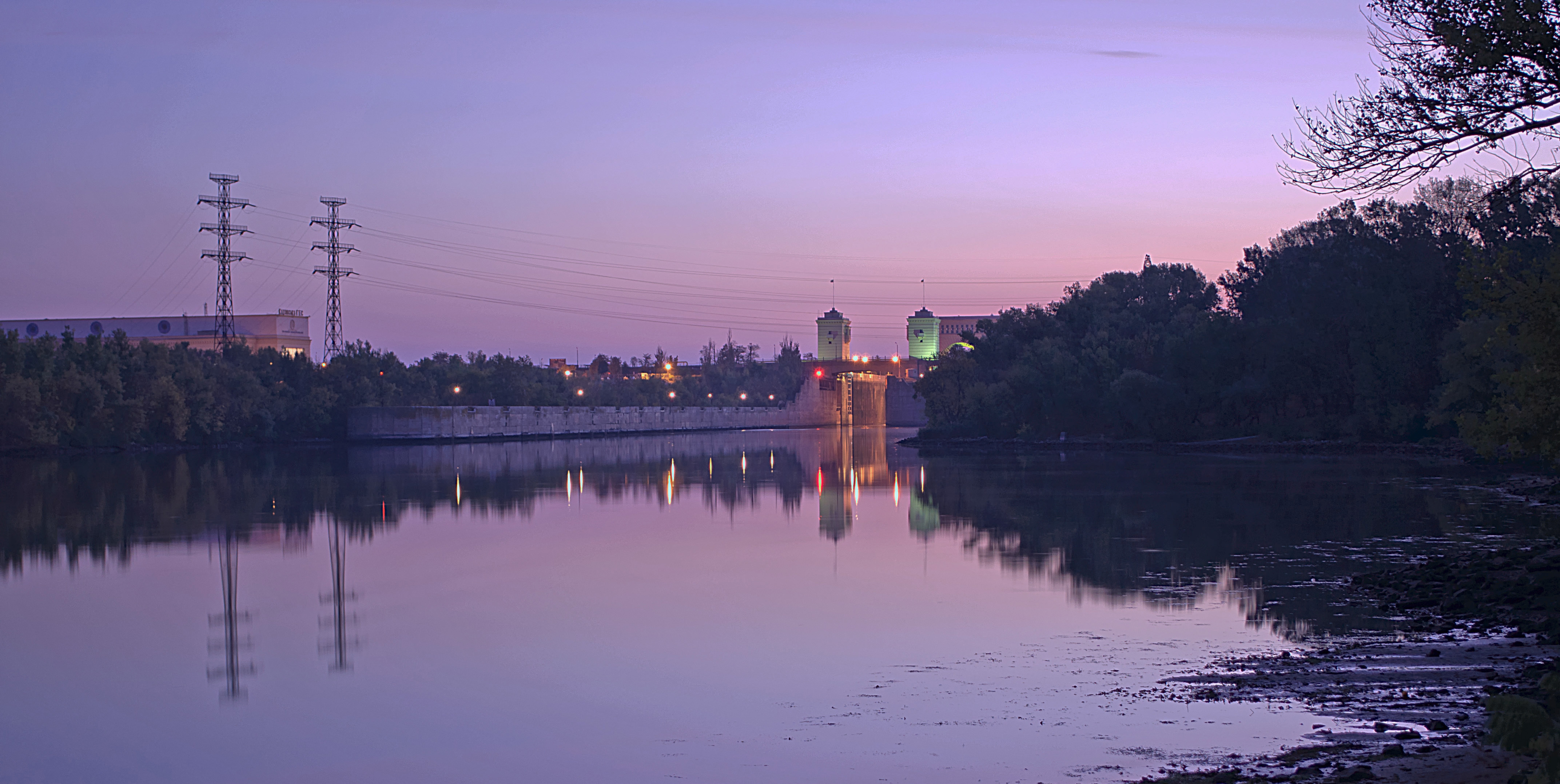
Nova Kakhovka, the oblast's second most populous city and site of the Kakhovka Hydroelectric Station

Cities in Kherson Oblast
Name	Name (in Ukrainian) (Note: Links to the Ukrainian Wikipedia articles for each city)	Raion (district)	Population (2022 estimates) (Note: The 2022 population estimates are accurate as of 1 January 2022 and are calculated by the State Statistics Service of Ukraine based on the "available administrative data on state registration of births and deaths and change of residence registration.")	Population (2001 census)	Population change
Beryslav	Берислав	Beryslav	11,895	15,455	−23.03%
Henichesk	Генічеськ	Henichesk	18,889	21,793	−13.33%
Hola Prystan	Гола Пристань	Skadovsk	13,544	16,028	−15.50%
Kakhovka	Каховка	Kakhovka	34,749	38,238	−9.12%
Kherson	Херсон	Kherson	279,131	328,360	−14.99%
Nova Kakhovka	Нова Каховка	Kakhovka	44,427	52,611	−15.56%
Oleshky	Олешки	Kherson	24,124	24,123	0.00%
Skadovsk	Скадовськ	Skadovsk	16,969	19,641	−13.60%
Tavriisk	Таврійськ	Kakhovka	10,108	11,452	−11.74%

== See also ==
- List of cities in Ukraine
