= Zelenyi Hai, Henichesk Raion, Kherson Oblast =

Village in Henichesk Raion, Kherson Oblast, Ukraine

Zelenyi Hai Зелений Гай
- Village
- Interactive map of Zelenyi Hai
- Location within Kherson Oblast Location within Ukraine
- Coordinates: 46°22′31″N 34°53′21″E
- Country: Ukraine
- Oblast: Kherson Oblast
- Raion: Henichesk Raion

Zelenyi Hai (Ukrainian: Зелений Гай) is a village in Henichesk Raion, Kherson Oblast, southern Ukraine. It belongs to Henichesk urban hromada, one of the hromadas of Ukraine. It is situated east of village Novyi Myr. However, the village is essentially abandoned, as there is no registered permanent residents living in the village, at least since the 2001 Ukrainian census as this was the last census update on population.

== History ==
The village was formally called Cherha-Pesha (Черга-Пеша), at least during Soviet times in 1941 when it was recorded as part of the General Staff of the Workers' and Peasants' Red Army (RKKA) topographic military maps (specifically the L-36 series) that were produced for reconnaissance during the Great Patriotic War. It was administratively subordinated to the Novohryhorivka village council during Soviet times. From 17 September 1941 to 29 October 1943 during the Great Patriotic War the village was occupied by German troops, before the village was regained by the Soviets.

On 17 July 2020 as a result of administrative territorial reform and liquidation of the former Henichesk hromada, it became part of the newly formed Henichesk hromada. The 2022 Russian invasion of Ukraine that resulted from the escalating Russo-Ukrainian War led to Zelenyi Hai being occupied by Russian forces during the opening days of the invasion.
