= Rykove =

Rural locality in Kherson Oblast, Ukraine

Rykove Рикове
- Rural settlement
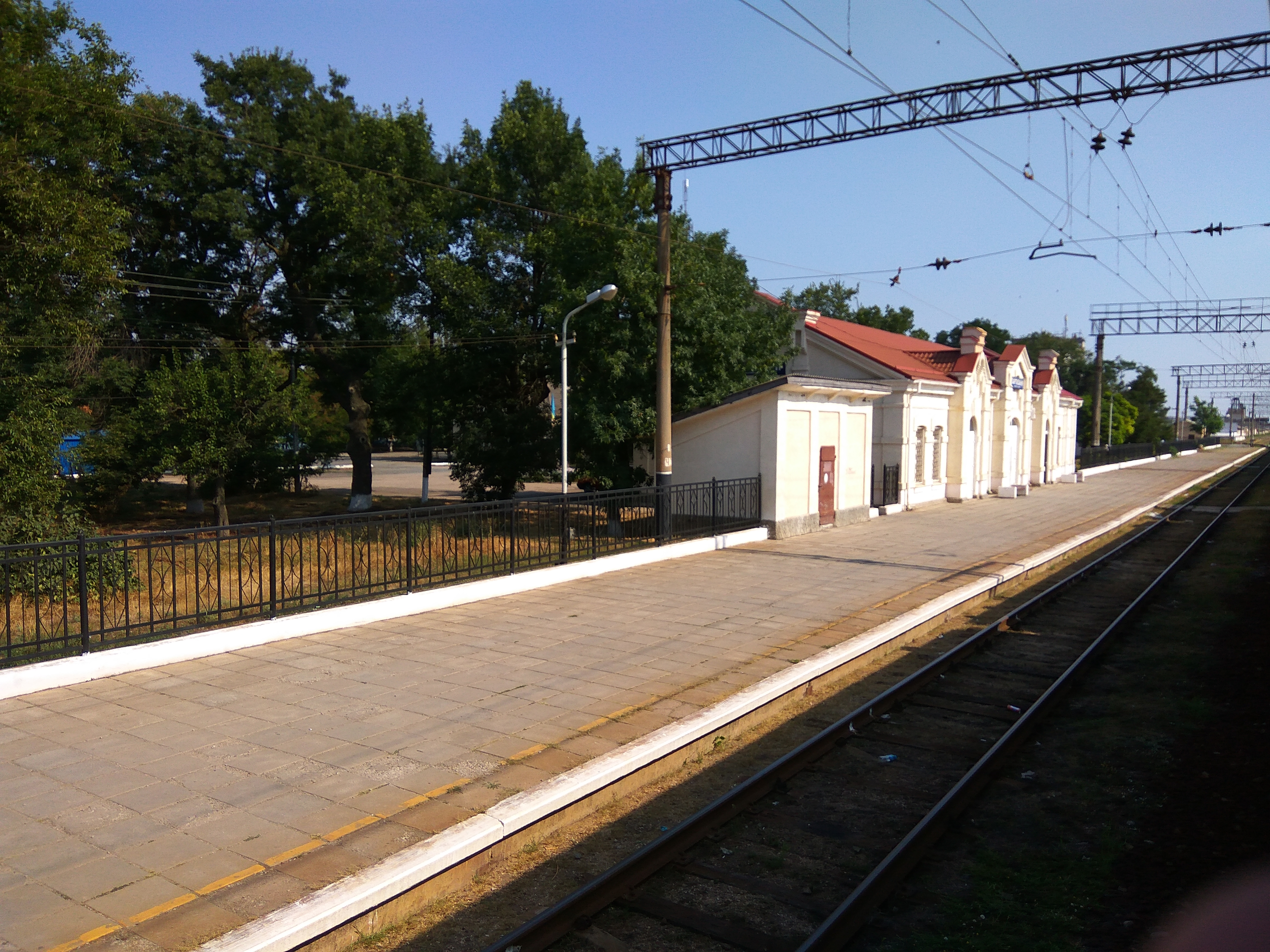
- Railway station

- Location within Kherson Oblast Location within Ukraine
- Coordinates: 46°19′51″N 34°45′9″E
- Country: Ukraine
- Oblast: Kherson Oblast
- Raion: Henichesk Raion
- Hromada: Henichesk urban hromada

Population (2022)
  - Total: ▼3,487
- Time zone: UTC+2 (EET)
  - Summer (DST): UTC+3 (EEST)

Rykove (Ukrainian: Рикове; Russian: Рыково), previously known as Partyzany (Ukrainian: Партизани) until 2016, is a rural settlement in Henichesk Raion, Kherson Oblast, southern Ukraine. It belongs to Henichesk urban hromada, one of the hromadas of Ukraine. It has a population of 3,487 (2022 estimate).

== History ==
During the Ukrainian War of Independence, from 1917 to 1920, it passed between various factions. Afterwards it was administratively part of the Zaporizhzhia Governorate of Ukraine.

On 19 May 2016, the Verkhovna Rada adopted the decision to rename Partyzany to Rykove according to the law prohibiting names of Communist origin.

Until 26 January 2024, Rykove was designated urban-type settlement. On this day, a new law entered into force which abolished this status, and Rykove became a rural settlement.

== Economy ==
=== Transportation ===
Rykove is located on the railway line connecting Melitopol with Novooleksiivka and which continues further to Dzhankoi; however, after the annexation of Crimea by the Russian Federation, all traffic to Crimea has been suspended. It is also on the M18 highway, connecting Kharkiv via Dnipro, Zaporizhzhia, and Melitopol with Crimea.

== See also ==
- Russian occupation of Kherson Oblast
