= Karierne, Kherson Oblast =

Rural locality in Kherson Oblast, Ukraine

Karierne Кар'єрне
- Rural settlement
- Location in Kherson Oblast Location in Ukraine
- Country: Ukraine
- Oblast: Kherson Oblast
- Raion: Beryslav Raion
- Hromada: Velyka Oleksandrivka settlement hromada

Population (2022)
  - Total: ▼323
- Time zone: UTC+2 (EET)
  - Summer (DST): UTC+3 (EEST)

Karierne (Ukrainian: Кар'єрне; Russian: Карьерное) is a rural settlement in Beryslav Raion, Kherson Oblast, southern Ukraine. It is located in the steppe, 2 kilometres (1.2 mi) from the right bank of the Inhulets. Karierne belongs to Velyka Oleksandrivka settlement hromada, one of the hromadas of Ukraine. It has a population of 323 (2022 estimate).

== History ==
Until 18 July 2020, Karierne belonged to Velyka Oleksandrivka Raion. The raion was abolished in July 2020 as part of the administrative reform of Ukraine, which reduced the number of raions of Kherson Oblast to five. The area of Velyka Oleksandrivka Raion was merged into Beryslav Raion.

Until 26 January 2024, Karierne was designated urban-type settlement. On this day, a new law entered into force which abolished this status, and Karierne became a rural settlement.

== Economy ==
=== Transportation ===
The closest railway station is Bila Krynytsia, on the railway connecting Apostolove and Snihurivka (with further connections to Kherson and Mykolaiv). There is some passenger traffic.

The settlement has road connections with Kryvyi Rih, Snihurivka, and Beryslav.

== See also ==
- Russian occupation of Kherson Oblast
