= Velyka Lepetykha =

Rural locality in Kherson Oblast, Ukraine

Velyka Lepetykha Велика Лепетиха
- Rural settlement
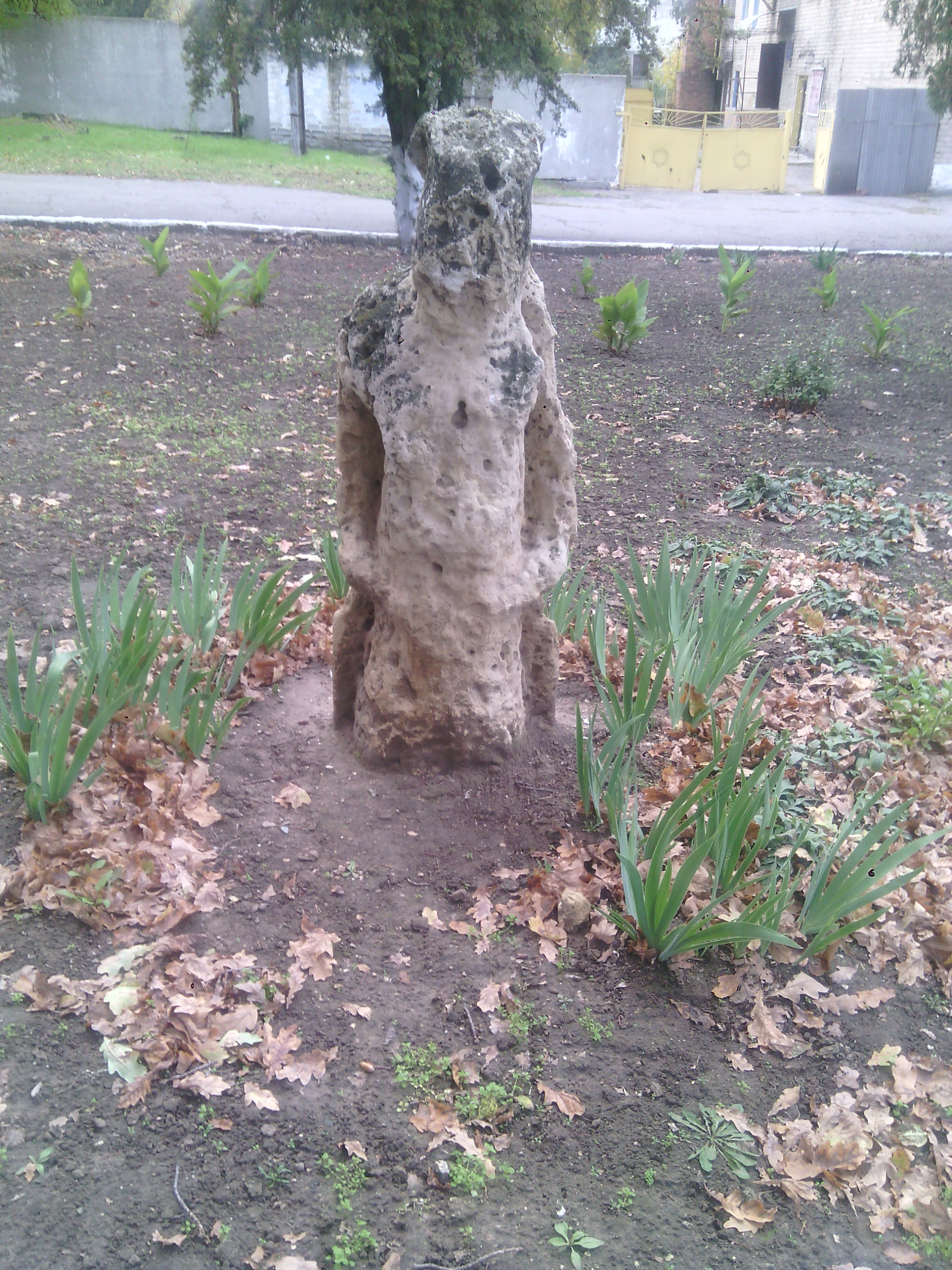
- Cuman kurgan stele in Velyka Lepetykha

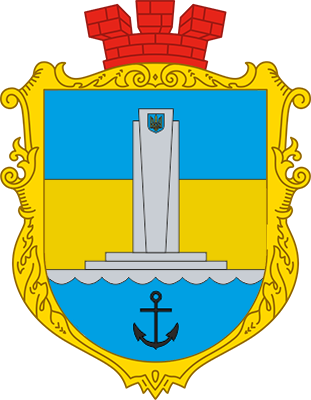
- Coat of arms

- Location within Ukraine Location within Kherson Oblast
- Coordinates: 47°09′31″N 33°55′54″E
- Country: Ukraine
- Oblast: Kherson Oblast
- Raion: Kakhovka Raion
- Hromada: Velyka Lepetykha settlement hromada

Population (2022)
  - Total: ▼7,707
- Time zone: UTC+2 (EET)
  - Summer (DST): UTC+3 (EEST)

Velyka Lepetykha (Ukrainian: Велика Лепетиха; Russian: Большая Лепетиха) is a rural settlement in Kakhovka Raion, Kherson Oblast, southern Ukraine. It hosts the administration of Velyka Lepetykha settlement hromada, one of the hromadas of Ukraine. The settlement is located on the left bank of the Kakhovka Reservoir, an artificial reservoir on the Dnieper. It has a population of 7,707 (2022 estimate).

== History ==
During the Ukrainian War of Independence, from 1917 to 1920, it passed between various factions. Afterwards it was administratively part of the Zaporizhzhia Governorate of Ukraine.

Until 18 July 2020, Velyka Lepetykha was the administrative center of Velyka Lepetykha Raion. The raion was abolished in July 2020 as part of the administrative reform of Ukraine, which reduced the number of raions of Kherson Oblast to five. The area of Velyka Lepetykha Raion was merged into Kakhovka Raion. On 24 February 2022, the village was captured by Russian forces.

Until 26 January 2024, Velyka Lepetykha was designated urban-type settlement. On this day, a new law entered into force which abolished this status, and Velyka Lepetykha became a rural settlement.

== Demographics ==
As of the 2001 Ukrainian census, Velyka Lepetykha had a population of 9,941 inhabitants, which decreased to 7,702 in early 2022. The linguistic composition of the settlement was as follows:

Languages in Velyka Lepetykha
	percent
Ukrainian	93.6%
Russian	5.6%
Romani	0.3%
Armenian	0.2%
Belarusian	0.1%
Romanian	0.1%
others	0.1%

== Economy ==
=== Transportation ===
Velyka Lepetykha has access to a paved road which follows the left bank of the Dnieper and connects Kakhovka with Kamianka-Dniprovska. In Kakhovka, there is access to the Highway M14, connecting Kherson with Mariupol via Melitopol. Another road leads to Henichesk via Nyzhni Sirohozy.

== Notable people ==
- Yevheniya Dovhodko (born 1992), Ukrainian rower
- Tymofiy Sukhar (born 1999), Ukrainian football player
