= Novotroitske, Kherson Oblast =

Rural locality in Kherson Oblast, Ukraine

Novotroitske Новотроїцьке
- Rural settlement
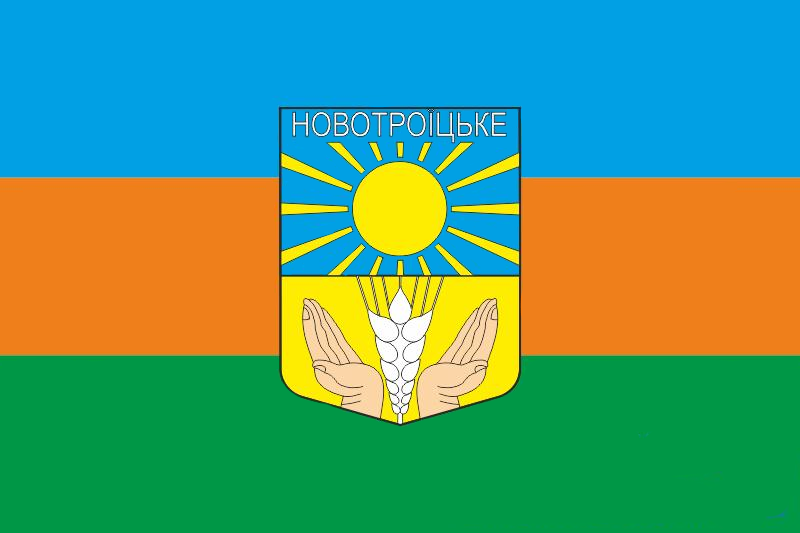
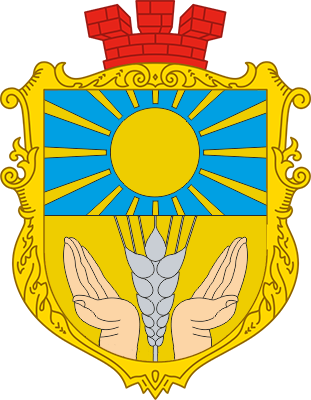
- Flag Coat of arms

- Location of Novotroitske Novotroitske (Kherson Oblast)
- Coordinates: 46°21′N 34°20′E
- Country: Ukraine
- Oblast: Kherson Oblast
- Raion: Henichesk Raion
- Hromada: Novotroitske settlement hromada
- Founded: 18?? (Novotroitske); 1816 (Velykyi Sara Bulat)

Area
  - Total: 122.3 km^{2} (47.2 sq mi)
- Elevation: 22 m (72 ft)

Population (2022)
  - Total: ▼10,535
  - Density: 88.5/km^{2} (229/sq mi)
- Time zone: UTC+2 (EET)
  - Summer (DST): UTC+3 (EEST)
- Postal code: 75300
- Area code: +380 5548

Novotroitske (Ukrainian: Новотроїцьке) is a rural settlement in Henichesk Raion, Kherson Oblast, southern Ukraine. It hosts the administration of the Novotroitske settlement hromada, one of the hromadas of Ukraine. It had a population of 10,535 (2022 estimate).

== History ==
Until 18 July 2020, Novotroitske was the administrative center of Novotroitske Raion. The raion was abolished in July 2020 as part of the administrative reform of Ukraine, which reduced the number of raions of Kherson Oblast to five. The area of Novotroitske Raion was merged into Henichesk Raion.

=== Russo-Ukrainian war ===
Novotroitske was captured by Russian ground forces on the first day of the Russian Invasion of Ukraine phase of the Russo-Ukrainian War when they crossed the nearby border of the de facto Republic of Crimea. A large column of Russian military vehicles drove through the village.

In March 2022, Ukrainian media reported that citizens held a peaceful rally against the Russian army occupation in the settlement.

In 2023, Ukraine's representative of the Kherson Oblast council, Serhiy Khlan, reported that Ukrainian Armed Forces had conducted a missile strike at a village in the district.

Until 26 January 2024, Novotroitske was designated urban-type settlement. On this day, a new law entered into force which abolished this status, and Novotroitske became a rural settlement.

== Demographics ==
As of the 2001 Ukrainian census, the settlement had a population of 11,703 inhabitants. The native language composition was as follows:

First languages (2001)
	percent
Ukrainian	83.6%
Russian	11.3%
Romani	1.2%
Belarusian	0.4%
Crimean Tatar	0.1%
Armenian	0.1%
Moldovan	0.1%
others	3.2%

== See also ==
- Russian occupation of Kherson Oblast
