= Nyzhni Sirohozy Raion =

Former subdivision of Kherson Oblast, Ukraine

Nyzhnyosirogizkyi Raion Нижньосірогозький район
- Raion
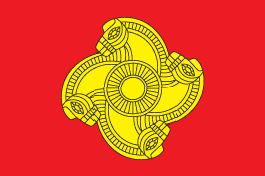
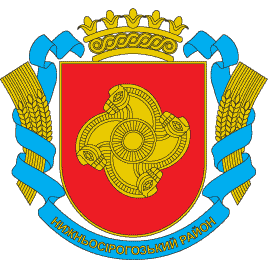
- Flag Coat of arms

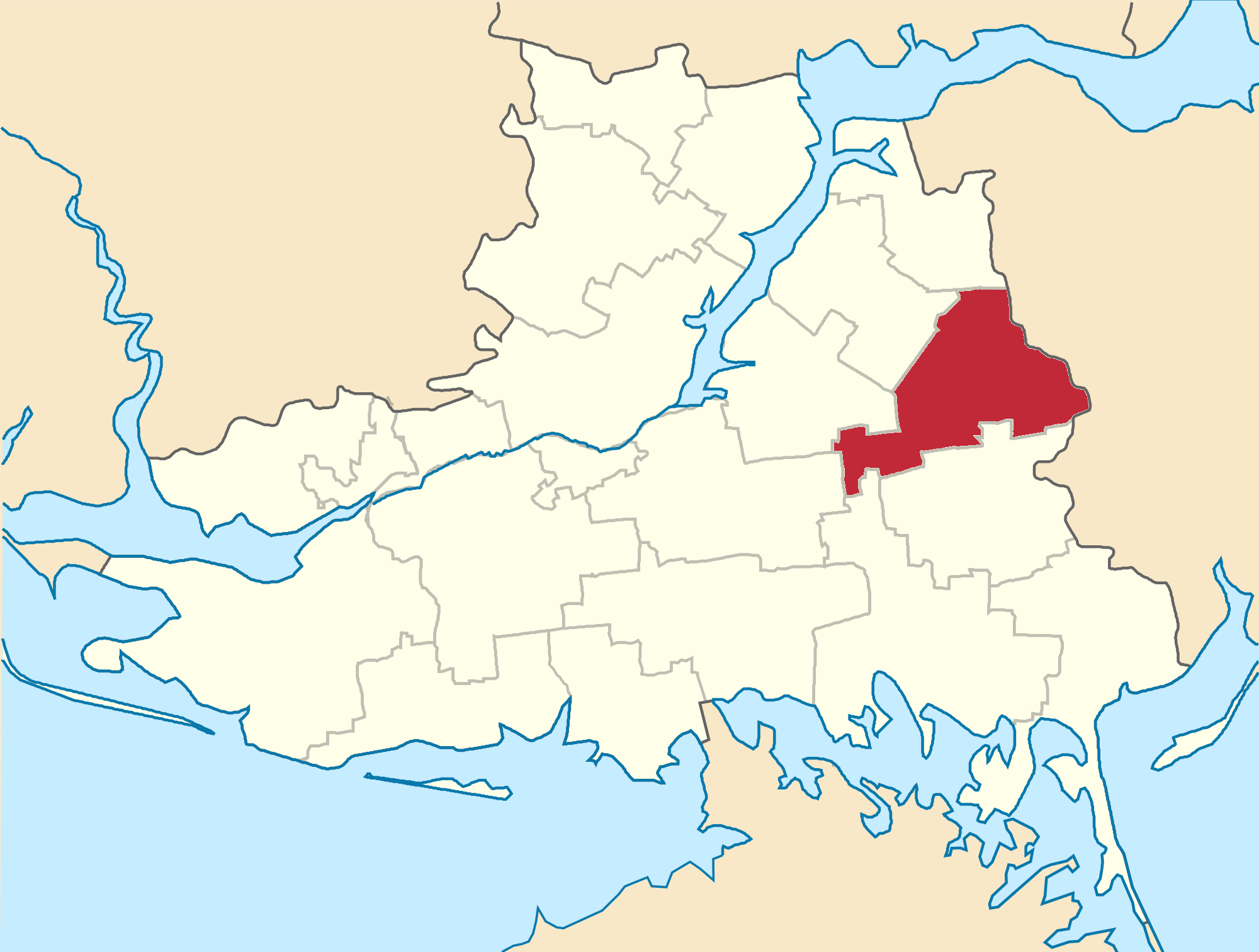
- Coordinates: 46°53′53.253″N 34°25′29.6292″E
- Country: Ukraine
- Region: Kherson Oblast
- Established: 1923
- Disestablished: 18 July 2020
- Admin. center: Nyzhni Sirohozy
- Subdivisions: List: 0 — city councils; 1 — settlement councils; 13 — rural councils; Number of localities: 0 — cities; 1 — urban-type settlements; 22 — villages; 2 — rural settlements

Government
  - Governor: Oleksandr Shylkin

Area
  - Total: 1,210 km^{2} (470 sq mi)

Population (2020)
  - Total: 15,033 ▼
  - Density: 12.4/km^{2} (32.2/sq mi)
- Time zone: UTC+02:00 (EET)
  - Summer (DST): UTC+03:00 (EEST)
- Postal index: 74700—74742
- Area code: +380 5540
- Website: http://n-serogozy.ks.ua

Nyzhni Sirohozy Raion (Ukrainian: Нижньосірогозький район) was one of the 18 administrative raions (a district) of Kherson Oblast in southern Ukraine. Its administrative center was located in the urban-type settlement of Nyzhni Sirohozy. The raion was abolished on 18 July 2020 as part of the administrative reform of Ukraine, which reduced the number of raions of Kherson Oblast to five. The area of Nyzhni Sirohozy Raion was merged into Henichesk Raion. The last estimate of the raion population was 15,033 (2020 est.)

At the time of disestablishment, the raion consisted of one hromada, Nyzhni Sirohozy settlement hromada with the administration in Nyzhni Sirohozy.

== Demographics ==
As of the 2001 Ukrainian census, the raion had a population 19,823, which decreased to 15,033 in early 2022. The population is overwhelmingly Ukrainian, but also has significant minority groups, which include Russians, Meskhetian Turks, Ukrainian Kurds, Koryo-saram and Moldovans. The exact ethnic and linguistic composition was as follows:

Ethnic groups (2001)
	percent
Ukrainians	82.21%
Russians	13.67%
Turks	0.99%
Moldovans	0.74%
Koreans	0.46%
others	1.93%

Native languages (2001)
	percent
Ukrainian	80.30%
Russian	17.45%
Turkish	0.94%
Romanian	0.39%
Kurdish	0.27%
others	0.64%
