= Nyzhni Sirohozy =

Rural locality in Kherson Oblast, Ukraine

Nyzhni Sirohozy Нижні Сірогози
- Rural settlement
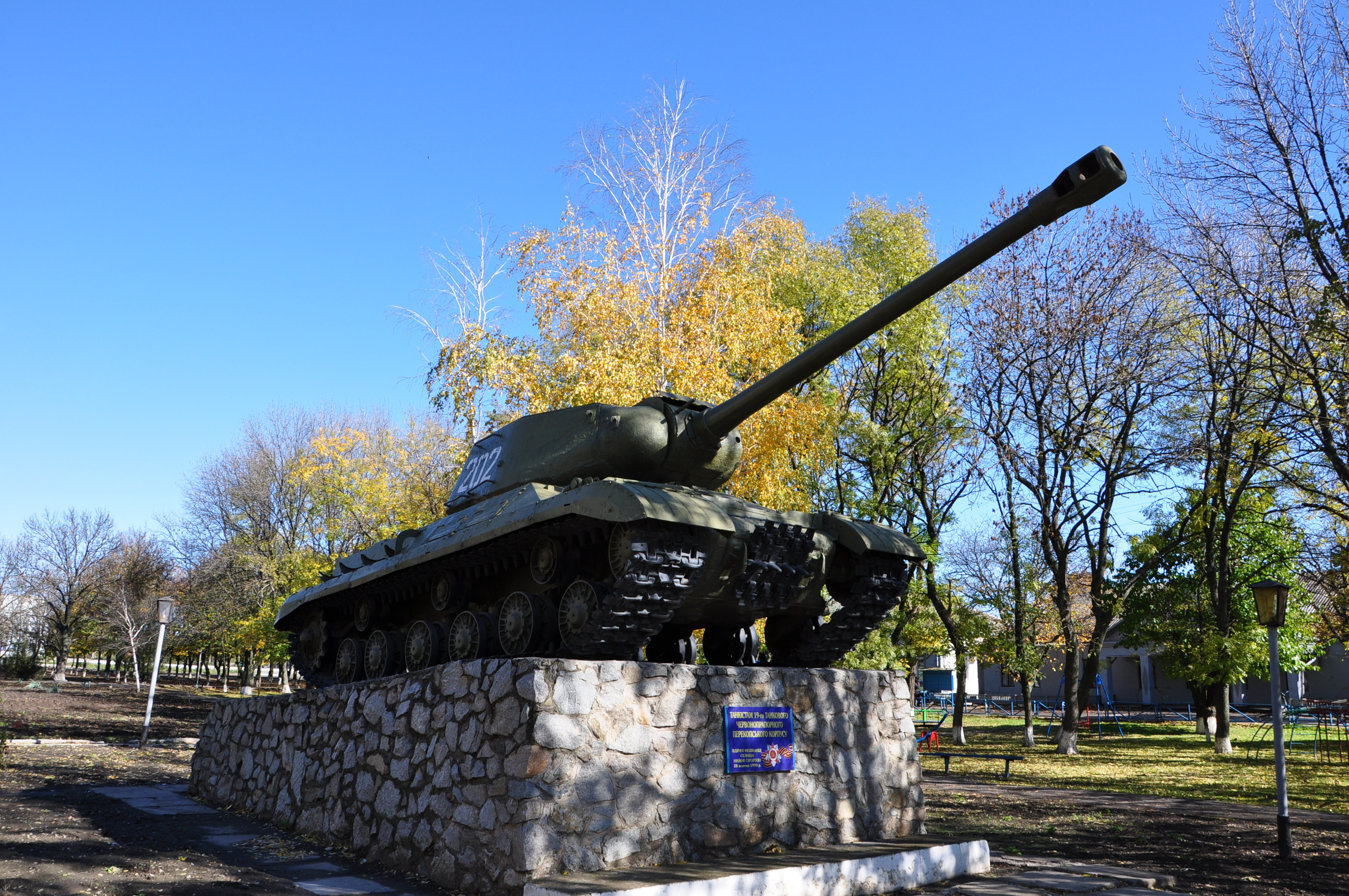
- Tank monument of Nyzhni Sirohozy

- Location within Kherson Oblast Location within Ukraine
- Coordinates: 46°50′31″N 34°22′36″E
- Country: Ukraine
- Oblast: Kherson Oblast
- Raion: Henichesk Raion
- Hromada: Nyzhni Sirohozy settlement hromada

Population (2022)
  - Total: ▼4,451
- Time zone: UTC+2 (EET)
  - Summer (DST): UTC+3 (EEST)

Nyzhni Sirohozy (Ukrainian: Нижні Сірогози; Russian: Нижние Серогозы) is a rural settlement in Henichesk Raion, Kherson Oblast, southern Ukraine. It is located inland, between Melitopol and Kherson. Nyzhni Sirohozy hosts the administration of Nyzhni Sirohozy settlement hromada, one of the hromadas of Ukraine. It has a population of 4,451 (2022 estimate).

== History ==
Until 18 July 2020, Nyzhni Sirohozy was the administrative center of Nyzhni Sirohozy Raion. The raion was abolished in July 2020 as part of the administrative reform of Ukraine, which reduced the number of raions of Kherson Oblast to five. The area of Nyzhni Sirohozy Raion was merged into Henichesk Raion.

Until 26 January 2024, Nyzhni Sirohozy was designated urban-type settlement. On this day, a new law entered into force which abolished this status, and Nyzhni Sirohozy became a rural settlement.

== Climate ==
Climate data for Nyzhni Sirohozy (1981–2010)
Month	Jan	Feb	Mar	Apr	May	Jun	Jul	Aug	Sep	Oct	Nov	Dec	Year
Mean daily maximum °C (°F)	1.0 (33.8)	1.8 (35.2)	7.7 (45.9)	16.2 (61.2)	22.7 (72.9)	26.8 (80.2)	29.8 (85.6)	29.2 (84.6)	23.2 (73.8)	15.8 (60.4)	7.4 (45.3)	2.3 (36.1)	15.3 (59.5)
Daily mean °C (°F)	−2.1 (28.2)	−1.9 (28.6)	2.8 (37.0)	9.8 (49.6)	15.9 (60.6)	20.2 (68.4)	23.0 (73.4)	22.3 (72.1)	16.6 (61.9)	10.1 (50.2)	3.6 (38.5)	−0.7 (30.7)	10.0 (50.0)
Mean daily minimum °C (°F)	−4.9 (23.2)	−5.2 (22.6)	−1.2 (29.8)	4.2 (39.6)	9.4 (48.9)	14.0 (57.2)	16.3 (61.3)	15.5 (59.9)	10.6 (51.1)	5.3 (41.5)	0.3 (32.5)	−3.5 (25.7)	5.1 (41.2)
Average precipitation mm (inches)	29.4 (1.16)	31.3 (1.23)	29.7 (1.17)	39.2 (1.54)	41.9 (1.65)	59.5 (2.34)	42.5 (1.67)	44.9 (1.77)	38.4 (1.51)	29.8 (1.17)	42.3 (1.67)	35.6 (1.40)	464.5 (18.29)
Average precipitation days (≥ 1.0 mm)	6.7	5.7	6.1	5.8	6.5	6.8	4.7	4.1	4.7	4.3	6.1	7.1	68.6
Average relative humidity (%)	87.0	84.1	78.9	68.8	64.7	65.9	60.2	58.7	66.4	75.6	86.2	88.2	73.7
Source: World Meteorological Organization

== Demographics ==
As of the 2001 Ukrainian census, the ton had a population of 5,992 inhabitants. The linguistic composition was as follows:

Native languages in Nyzhni Sirohozy
	percent
Ukrainian	92.6%
Russian	6.9%
Romanian	0.2%
Belarusian	0.1%
Armenian	0.1%
others	0.1%

== Economy ==
=== Transportation ===
Nyzhni Sirohozy has access to the Highway M14, connecting Kherson with Mariupol via Melitopol. Another road connects it with Henichesk and Velyka Lepetykha.

The closest railway station is in Sirohozy, about 10 kilometres (6.2 mi) north of the settlement, on a railway connecting Mykolaiv with Melitopol.

== See also ==
- Russian occupation of Kherson Oblast
