= Ivanivka, Kherson Oblast =

Rural locality in Kherson Oblast, Ukraine

Ivanivka Іванівка
- Rural settlement
- Location within Ukraine Location within Kherson Oblast
- Coordinates: 46°42′36″N 34°32′59″E
- Country: Ukraine
- Oblast: Kherson Oblast
- Raion: Henichesk Raion
- Hromada: Ivanivka settlement hromada

Population (2022)
  - Total: ▼4,329
- Time zone: UTC+2 (EET)
  - Summer (DST): UTC+3 (EEST)

Ivanivka (Ukrainian: Іванівка; Russian: Ивановка) is a rural settlement in Henichesk Raion, Kherson Oblast, southern Ukraine. It is located inland, north of Henichesk and west of Melitopol. Ivanivka hosts the administration of Ivanivka settlement hromada, one of the hromadas of Ukraine. It has a population of 4,329 (2022 estimate).

== Geography ==
Ivanivka is located in the central part of Black Sea Lowland.

== History ==
During the Ukrainian War of Independence, from 1917 to 1920, it passed between various factions. Afterwards it was administratively part of the Zaporizhzhia Governorate of Ukraine.

Until 18 July 2020, Ivanivka was the administrative center of Ivanivka Raion. The raion was abolished in July 2020 as part of the administrative reform of Ukraine, which reduced the number of raions of Kherson Oblast to five. The area of Ivanivka Raion was merged into Henichesk Raion.

Until 26 January 2024, Ivanivka was designated urban-type settlement. On this day, a new law entered into force which abolished this status, and Ivanivka became a rural settlement.

== Economy ==
=== Transportation ===
Ivanivka has access to the Highway M14 connecting Kherson with Mariupol via Melitopol. There is a paved road to Henichesk as well.

== Demographics ==
As of the 2001 Ukrainian census, Ivanivka had a population of 5.245 inhabitants. The native language composition was:

Native languages in Ivanivka
Languages	percent
Ukrainian	90.9%
Russian	5.5%
Moldovan	0.2%
Armenian	0.2%
Belarusian	0.1%
others	2.9%

== See also ==
- Russian occupation of Kherson Oblast
