= Ivanivka Raion, Kherson Oblast =

Former subdivision of Kherson Oblast, Ukraine

Ivanivskyi Raion Іванівський район
- Raion
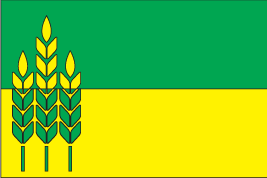
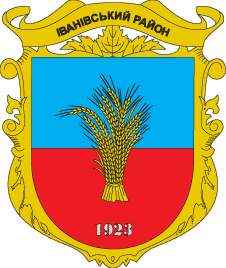
- Flag Coat of arms

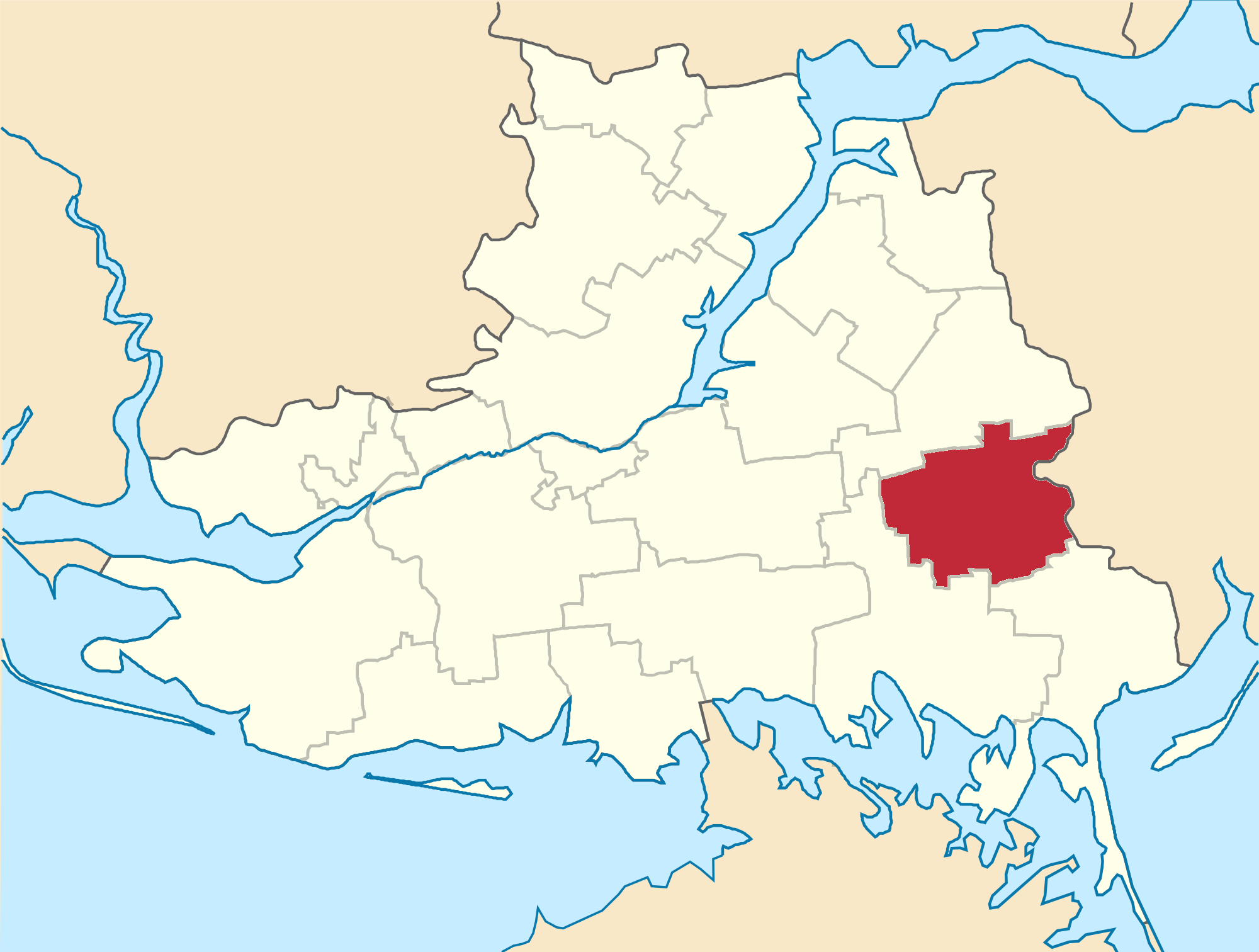
- Coordinates: 46°40′29.4888″N 34°27′55.9326″E
- Country: Ukraine
- Region: Kherson Oblast
- Established: 1923
- Disestablished: 18 July 2020
- Admin. center: Ivanivka
- Subdivisions: List: 0 — city councils; 1 — settlement councils; 14 — rural councils; Number of localities: 0 — cities; 1 — urban-type settlements; 24 — villages; 3 — rural settlements

Government
  - Governor: Dina Romanenko

Area
  - Total: 1,100 km^{2} (420 sq mi)

Population (2020)
  - Total: 13,172 ▼
  - Density: 12/km^{2} (31/sq mi)
- Time zone: UTC+02:00 (EET)
  - Summer (DST): UTC+03:00 (EEST)
- Postal index: 75400—75443
- Area code: +380 5531

Ivanivka Raion (Ukrainian: Іванівський район) was one of the 18 administrative raions (a district) of Kherson Oblast in southern Ukraine. Its administrative center was located in the urban-type settlement of Ivanivka. The raion was abolished on 18 July 2020 as part of the administrative reform of Ukraine, which reduced the number of raions of Kherson Oblast to five. The area of Ivanivka Raion was merged into Henichesk Raion. The last estimate of the raion population was 13,172 (2020 est.)

At the time of disestablishment, the raion consisted of one hromada, Ivanivka settlement hromada with the administration in Ivanivka.

== Demographics ==
As of the 2001 Ukrainian census, the raion had a population of 18,036 people. The ethnic and linguistic makeup of the raion was as follows:

Ethnic groups (2001)
| | percent |
| Ukrainians | 89.34% |
| Russians | 6.31% |
| Armenians | 0.79% |
| Tatars | 0.78% |
| Moldovans | 0.59% |
| others | 2.18% |

Native languages (2001)
| | percent |
| Ukrainian | 90.15% |
| Russian | 7.05% |
| Tatar | 0.64% |
| Armenian | 0.64% |
| Romanian | 0.39% |
| others | 1.13% |
