= Novotroitske Raion =

Former subdivision of Kherson Oblast, Ukraine

Novotroitskyi Raion Новотроїцький район
- Raion
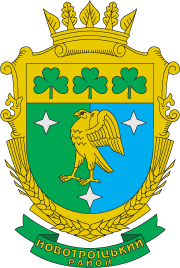
- Flag Coat of arms

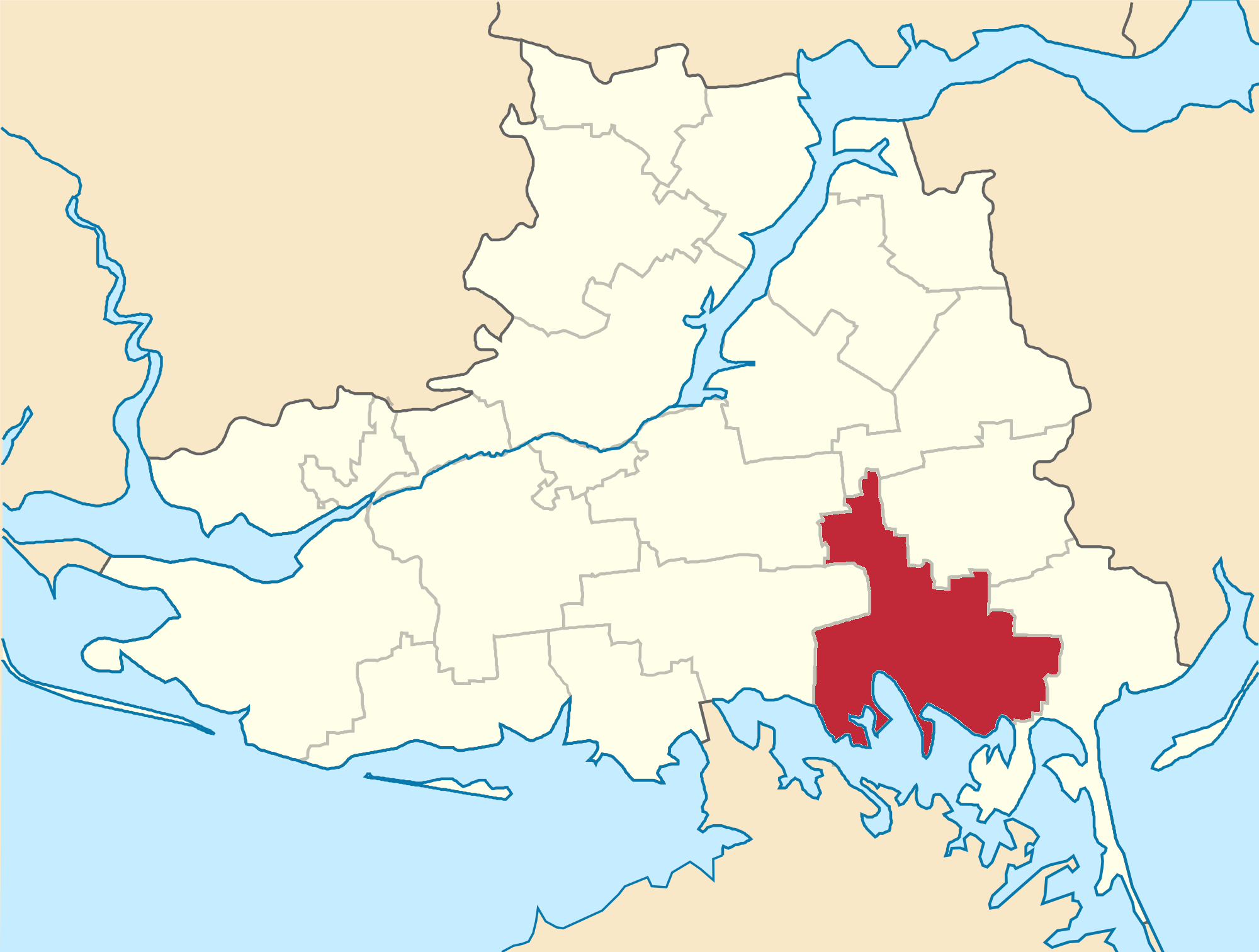
- Coordinates: 46°21′9″N 34°20′6″E
- Country: Ukraine
- Region: Kherson Oblast
- Established: 1923
- Disestablished: 18 July 2020
- Admin. center: Novotroitske
- Subdivisions: List: 0 — city councils; 2 — settlement councils; 17 — rural councils; Number of localities: 0 — cities; 2 — urban-type settlements; 42 — villages; 0 — rural settlements

Government
  - Governor: Petro Zabrovskyi

Area
  - Total: 2,298 km^{2} (887 sq mi)

Population (2020)
  - Total: 34,747 ▼
  - Density: 15.12/km^{2} (39.16/sq mi)
- Time zone: UTC+02:00 (EET)
  - Summer (DST): UTC+03:00 (EEST)
- Postal index: 75300—75362
- Area code: +380 5548

Novotroitske Raion (Ukrainian: Новотроїцький район) was one of the 18 administrative raions (districts) of Kherson Oblast in southern Ukraine. Its administrative center was located in the urban-type settlement of Novotroitske. The raion was abolished on 18 July 2020 as part of the administrative reform of Ukraine, which reduced the number of raions of Kherson Oblast to five. The area of Novotroitske Raion was merged into Henichesk Raion. The last estimate of the raion population was 34,747 (2020 est.)

At the time of disestablishment, the raion consisted of one hromada, Novotroitske settlement hromada with the administration in Novotroitske.

== Demographics ==
As of the 2001 Ukrainian census, the raion had a population of 43,025 inhabitants. The ethnic and linguistic composition of the population in the raion was as follows:

Ethnic groups (2001)
	percent
Ukrainians	86.62%
Russians	9.70%
Tatars	1.01%
Belarusians	0.56%
Gypsies	0.47%
others	1.64%

Native languages (2001)
	percent
Ukrainian	87.15%
Russian	10.67%
Tatar	0.82%
Romani	0.34%
Armenian	0.27%
others	0.74%
