= Henichesk Raion =

Subdivision of Kherson Oblast, Ukraine

Henichesk Raion Генічеський район
- Raion
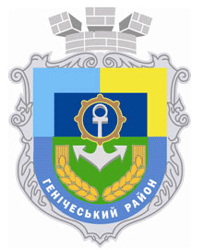
- Flag Coat of arms
- Interactive map of Henichesk Raion
- Coordinates: 46°29′N 34°33′E
- Country: Ukraine
- Oblast: Kherson Oblast
- Established: 1923
- Admin. center: Henichesk
- Subdivisions: 4 hromadas

Government
  - Governor: Valeriy Dronov

Area
  - Total: 7,120.5 km^{2} (2,749.2 sq mi)

Population (2022)
  - Total: 118,059
  - Density: 16.580/km^{2} (42.942/sq mi)
- Time zone: UTC+02:00 (EET)
  - Summer (DST): UTC+03:00 (EEST)
- Postal index: 75500—75583
- Area code: +380 5534

Henichesk Raion (Ukrainian: Генічеський район) is one of the five administrative raions (districts) of Kherson Oblast in southern Ukraine. Its administrative centre is located in the city of Henichesk. Population: 118,059 (2022 estimate).

On 18 July 2020, as part of the administrative reform of Ukraine, the number of raions of Kherson Oblast was reduced from 18 to five, and the area of Henichesk Raion was significantly expanded. Three abolished raions, Ivanivka, Nyzhni Sirohozy, and Novotroitske Raions, were merged into Henichesk Raion. The January 2020 estimate of the raion population was 58,331 (2020 est.).

In 2008, the raion had a 10% Crimean Tatar minority, with the Tatar population reaching 50% in two villages. This minority is a result of a 1967 Soviet decree that restored Tatar rights lost during the 1944 deportation of the Crimean Tatars. Because de jure they were not allowed to return to their Crimea homeland, some Tatars settled in nearby places, including Henichesk Raion. During the 2022 Russian invasion of Ukraine, the raion was captured and occupied by Russia.

== Subdivisions ==
=== Current ===
After the reform in July 2020, the raion consisted of 4 hromadas:

- Henichesk urban hromada with the administration in the city of Henichesk, retained from Henichesk Raion;
- Ivanivka settlement hromada with the administration in the rural settlement of Ivanivka, transferred from Ivanivka Raion.
- Novotroitske settlement hromada with the administration in the rural settlement of Novotroitske;
- Nyzhni Sirohozy settlement hromada with the administration in the rural settlement of Nyzhni Sirohozy;

=== Before 2020 ===
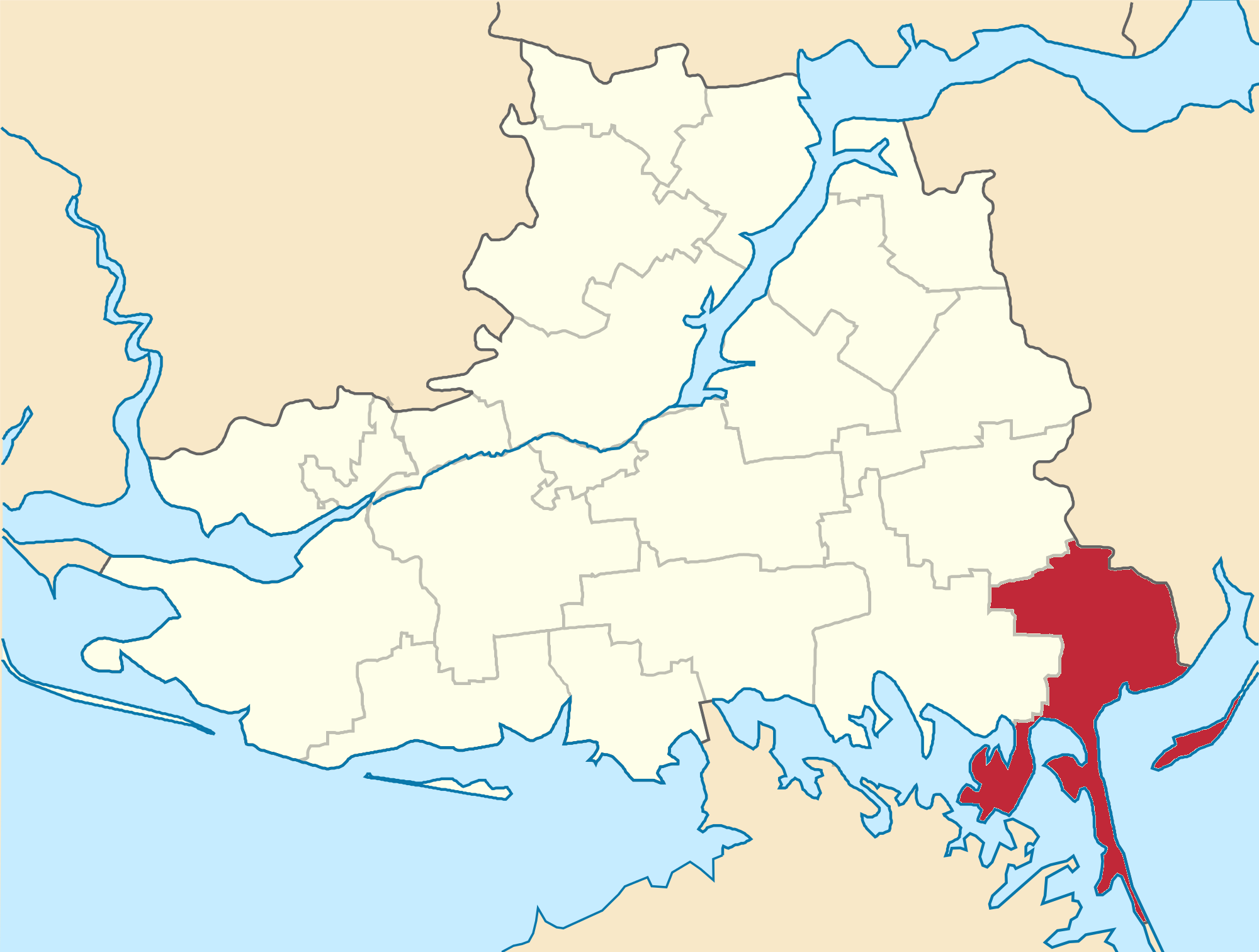
Henichesk Raion in Kherson Oblast before 2020

Before the 2020 reform, the raion consisted of one hromada. Henichesk urban hromada with the administration in Henichesk.

== Demographics ==
=== Ethnic groups & languages ===
As of the 2001 Ukrainian census, the raion (Note: Cited percentages and population figures only reflect the pre-2020 boundaries of the raion.) had a population of 66,291 inhabitants. The population is largely ethnically Ukrainian, but also includes notable Russian, Tatar and Crimean Tatar minorities. In terms of spoken languages, the district is almost equally Ukraino and Russophone. The exact ethnic and linguistic makeup was as follows:

Ethnic groups (2001)
	percent
Ukrainians	65.0%
Russians	23.4%
Tatars (Note: Many Crimean Tatars declared themselves as regular Tatars in the census)	6.2%
Crimean Tatars	2.8%
Belarusians	0.6%
Armenians	0.6%
Moldovans	0.2%
others	1.2%

Native languages (2001)
	percent
Ukrainian	46.0%
Russian	45.0%
Crimean Tatar	1.1%
Armenian	0.4%
Belarusian	0.2%
Romanian	0.1%
Romani	0.1%
others	7.1%

=== Settlements ===
Settlements in the raion include:

- Zelenyi Hai
