= Kherson Oblast =

Oblast (region) of Ukraine

Coordinates: 46°30′N 34°00′E

Kherson Oblast Херсонська область
- Oblast (Note: Partially annexed by Russia as Kherson Oblast)
- Khersonska oblast
- Flag Coat of arms
- Nickname: Херсонщина (Khersonshchyna)
- Pre-July 2020 boundary shown
- Country: Ukraine
- Established: 30 March 1944
- Administrative center: Kherson

Government
  - Governor: Oleksandr Prokudin (Note: Control over Kherson Oblast is disputed due to the 2022 Russian invasion of Ukraine. In the Russian-occupied part of the Oblast, the governor is Vladimir Saldo. Prokudin is the governor recognized by Ukraine.)
  - Oblast council: 64 seats
  - Chairperson: Oleksandr Samoylenko

Area
  - Total: 28,461 km^{2} (10,989 sq mi)

Population (2022)
  - Total: 1,001,598
  - Rank: Ranked 22nd
  - Density: 35.192/km^{2} (91.147/sq mi)

GDP
  - Total: ₴ 88 billion (€2.3 billion)
  - Per capita: ₴ 87,378 (€2,300)
- Time zone: UTC+2 (EET)
  - Summer (DST): UTC+3 (EEST)
- Postal code: 73–75
- Area code: +380-55
- ISO 3166 code: UA-65
- Vehicle registration: ВT
- Raions: 5
- Cities (total): 9
  - Regional cities: 3
- Urban-type settlements: 30
- Villages: 658
- HDI (2022): 0.740 high
- FIPS 10-4: UP08
- NUTS statistical regions of Ukraine: UA43
- Website: khoda.gov.ua

Kherson Oblast (Ukrainian: Херсонська область, romanized: Khersonska oblast, IPA: [xerˈsɔnʲsʲkɐ ˈɔblɐsʲtʲ]; Russian: Херсонская область, romanized: Khersonskaya oblast'), also known as Khersonshchyna (Херсонщина, IPA: [xerˈsɔnʃtʃɪnɐ]), is an oblast (province) in southern Ukraine. It is located just north of Crimea. Its administrative center is Kherson, on the northern or right bank of the Dnieper river, which bisects the oblast. The oblast has an area of 28,461 km^{2} and a population of 1,001,598 (2022 estimate). It is considered the 'fruit basket' of Ukraine, as much of its agricultural produce gets distributed throughout the country, with production peaking in summer.

Most of Kherson Oblast has been under Russian military occupation since it was captured early on in Russia's full-scale invasion of Ukraine in 2022. In September 2022, Russia claimed to have annexed Kherson Oblast, after arranging a disputed referendum. The referendum and the claimed annexation are internationally unrecognized. As the result of a counteroffensive operation, Ukrainian forces retook all the area on the right bank of the Dnieper, including Kherson city, by mid-November 2022.

== History ==
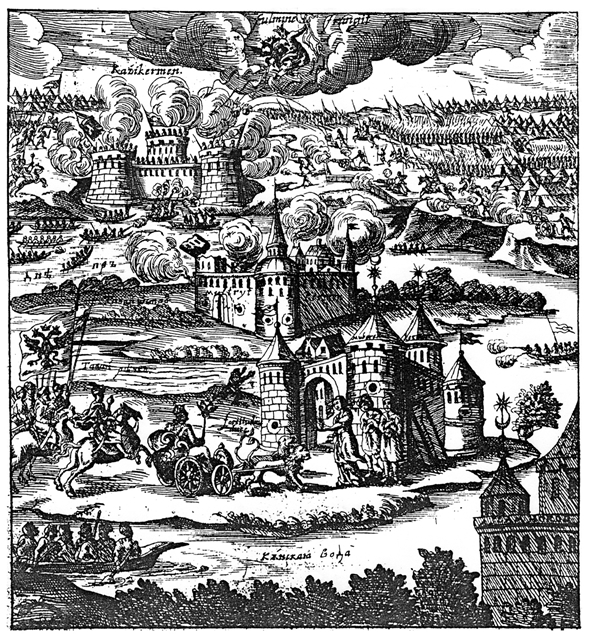
17th-century view of Kazikermen, now Beryslav

At various times throughout its history, the territory was ruled either entirely or partly by Scythia, ancient Greeks, Old Great Bulgaria, Khazars, Kipchaks, the Byzantine Empire, Kyivan Rus', Italians, the Mongol Empire, Lithuania, the Crimean Khanate, the Ottoman Empire, Poland and Russia. In medieval times, the towns of greatest importance were Oleshia, a former Byzantine, Kyivan Rus' and Genoese trading port, and Tawan/Kazikermen, a former Lithuanian customs point and Polish and Turkish fortress, which is now Beryslav. Another notable town in the early modern period was Bilchowisce, now Kherson.

In 1917–1920 the territory was variously controlled by the Ukrainians, Bolsheviks and White Russians, decisively becoming part Soviet Ukraine in 1920. It was the scene of Soviet genocidal crimes, chiefly the Holodomor of 1932–1933, and part of the Katyn massacre of 1940. During World War II, it was occupied by Germany from 1941 to 1944.

The province was established in 1944 within Soviet Ukraine. In the 1991 Ukrainian independence referendum, 90.13% of votes in Kherson Oblast were in favor of the Declaration of Independence of Ukraine.

A survey conducted by the Kyiv International Institute of Sociology in December 2014 found that 90.9% of the oblast's population opposed their region joining Russia, 1% supported the idea, and the rest were undecided or did not respond.

=== Russian invasion ===
Map showing territorial control in Kherson Oblast

As a result of the 24 February 2022 Russian invasion of Ukraine, Russian forces occupied most of the oblast. Russian-controlled parts of the oblast were governed by the "Kherson military–civilian administration" from 28 April to 30 September 2022.

On 27 July 2022, the Ukrainian army destroyed the Antonivka Road Bridge, as part of its wider campaign to isolate the Russian forces on the right bank of the Dnieper river.

On 23–27 September 2022, the Russian Federation held referendums in the occupied territories of Kherson Oblast, claiming that the result was in favor of Russian annexation. Most states have recognized that the referendums were staged and against international law.

On 29 September, the Russian Federation recognized Kherson Oblast as an independent state. The next day, Russian president Vladimir Putin announced the annexation of Kherson Oblast and signed an "accession decree" that is widely considered to be illegal. At that time, Russia was not in control of the province as a whole.

The United Nations General Assembly subsequently passed a resolution calling on countries not to recognise what it described as an "attempted illegal annexation" and demanded that Russia "immediately, completely and unconditionally withdraw".

By 11 November 2022, the city of Kherson and all the Russian-held territory on the right bank of the Dnieper had been recaptured by Ukrainian forces. The territory on the left bank is still under Russian control.

On 6 June 2023, the Kakhovka Dam was breached, causing extensive flooding downstream and prompting mass evacuations in the oblast, while the Kakhovka Reservoir was drained.

Russian authorities claimed that Russian President Vladimir Putin won 88.12% of the vote in the occupied Kherson region in the 2024 Russian presidential election, which has been described as rigged and fraudulent.

== Geography ==
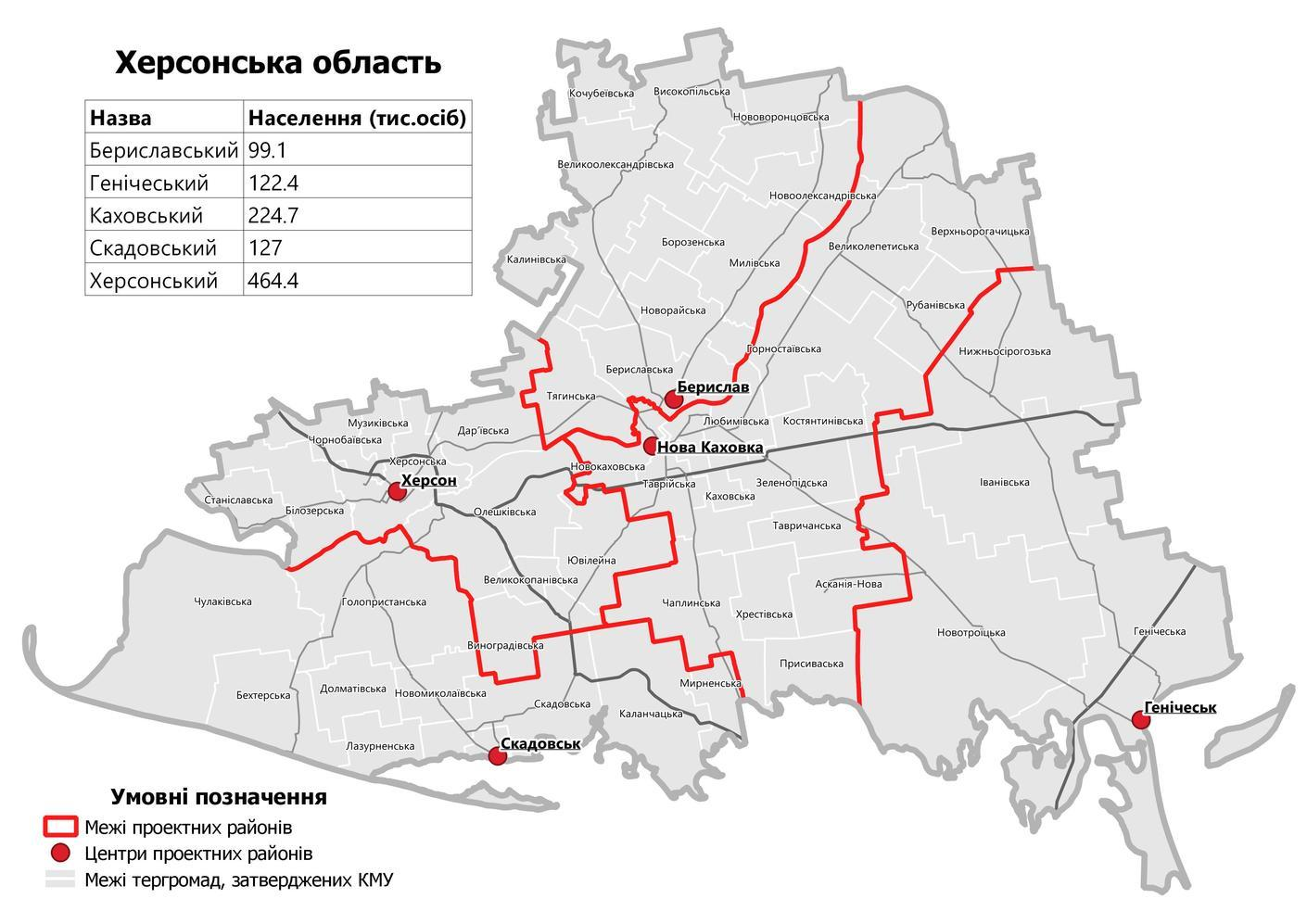
Kherson Oblast and subdivisions since July 2020

Kherson Oblast is bordered by Dnipropetrovsk Oblast to the north, the Black Sea and Crimea to the south, Mykolaiv Oblast to the west, and the Azov Sea and Zaporizhzhia Oblast to the east. The Dnieper River, which includes the Kakhovka Reservoir, runs through the oblast.

Before the 2022 Russian invasion of Ukraine, two bridges spanned the Dniper: the Kakhovka Bridge near Nova Kakhovka and the Antonivka Road Bridge at Kherson. Another significant bridge, the Daryivka Bridge crosses the Inhulets river and connects Kherson via the M14 highway to Beryslav, the other abutment of the Kakhovka Bridge.

The oblast's Henichesk Raion includes the northern portion of the Arabat Spit, a thin strip of land between the brackish Syvash and the Sea of Azov that is geographically part of the Crimean Peninsula. Due to Russia gaining de facto control of the Autonomous Republic of Crimea in 2014, this strip within Kherson Oblast was the only part of the Crimean Peninsula under Ukrainian control immediately prior to the 2022 Russian invasion of Ukraine.

Historically, it is located in Yedisan (north-western part), Zaporizhzhia (northern part) and Pryazovia (southern and eastern parts).

Kherson is the only city in the oblast with a population over 100,000. Four other cities have over 30,000; they are, in order from largest, Nova Kakhovka, Kakhovka, Oleshky and Henichesk.

== Administrative divisions ==
Until the 2020 re-organisation, the Kherson Oblast was administratively subdivided into 18 raions (districts) and 3 municipalities. The municipalities – Kherson (administrative center of the oblast), Nova Kakhovka, and Kakhovka – were directly subordinate to the oblast government. The Kherson municipality was subdivided into 3 urban districts. All information below was current as of 2015.

Name	Ukrainian name	Area (km^{2})	Population 2015	Admin. center	Urban population only
Kherson	Херсон (місто)	423	333,737	Kherson	322,260
Hola Prystan	Гола Пристань (місто)	9	14,883	Hola Prystan	14,568
Nova Kakhovka	Нова Каховкa (місто)	223	68,205	Nova Kakhovka	62,128
Kakhovka	Каховкa (місто)	16	36,958	Kakhovka	36,958
Beryslav Raion	Бериславський (район)	1,721	48,025	Beryslav	16,682
Bilozerka Raion	Білозерський (район)	1,534	66,564	Bilozerka	9,739
Chaplynka Raion	Чаплинський (район)	1,722	35,219	Chaplynka	12,638
Henichesk Raion	Генічеський (район)	3,008	59,991	Henichesk	33,748
Hola Prystan Raion	Голопристанський (район)	3,411	45,827	Hola Prystan	14,666
Hornostaivka Raion	Горностаївський (район)	1,018	19,788	Hornostaivka	6,681
Ivanivka Raion	Іванівський (район)	1,120	13,995	Ivanivka	4,560
Kalanchak Raion	Каланчацький (район)	916	21,568	Kalanchak	11,169
Kakhovka Raion	Каховський (район)	1,450	35,968	Kakhovka	N/A *
Novotroitske Raion	Новотроїцький (район)	2,298	35,921	Novotroitske	14,979
Novovorontsovka Raion	Нововоронцовський (район)	1,005	21,442	Novovorontsovka	6,379
Nyzhni Sirohozy Raion	Нижньосірогозький (район)	1,209	15,985	Nyzhni Sirohozy	4,891
Oleshky Raion	Олешківський (район)	1,759	71,888	Oleshky	36,317
Skadovsk Raion	Скадовський (район)	1,456	47,930	Skadovsk	21,830
Velyka Lepetykha Raion	Великолепетиський (район)	1,000	16,827	Velyka Lepetykha	8,326
Velyka Oleksandrivka Raion	Великоолександрівський (район)	1,540	25,948	Velyka Oleksandrivka	9,747
Verkhniy Rohachyk Raion	Верхньорогачицький (район)	915	12,003	Verkhniy Rohachyk	5,698
Vysokopillia Raion	Високопільський (район)	701	15,121	Vysokopillia	6,148

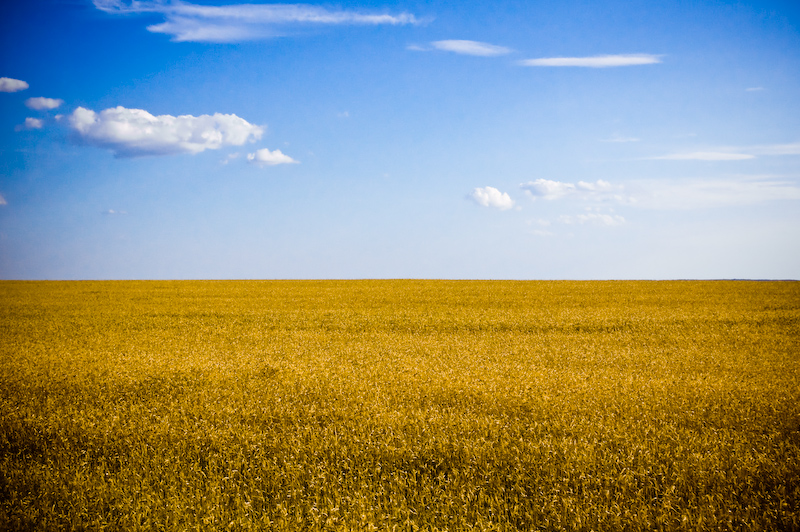
Typical agricultural landscape of Kherson Oblast

.* Note: Though the administrative center of the raion is housed in the city/town that it is named after, cities do not answer to the raion authorities only towns do; instead they are directly subordinated to the oblast government and therefore are not counted as part of raion statistics.

At a lower level of administration, these district-level administrations are subdivided into:

- Settlements – 697, including:
  - Villages – 658; – See List of villages in Kherson Oblast
  - Cities/Urban-type settlements – 36, including:
    - Cities of raion subordinance – 4 (Beryslav, Henichesk, Skadovsk, Tavriisk, and Oleshky);
    - Urban-type settlement – 30;
- Selsovets – 260.

The local administration of the oblast is controlled by the Kherson Regional Council. The governor of the oblast is the Kherson Regional Council speaker, appointed by the President of Ukraine.

== Demographics ==
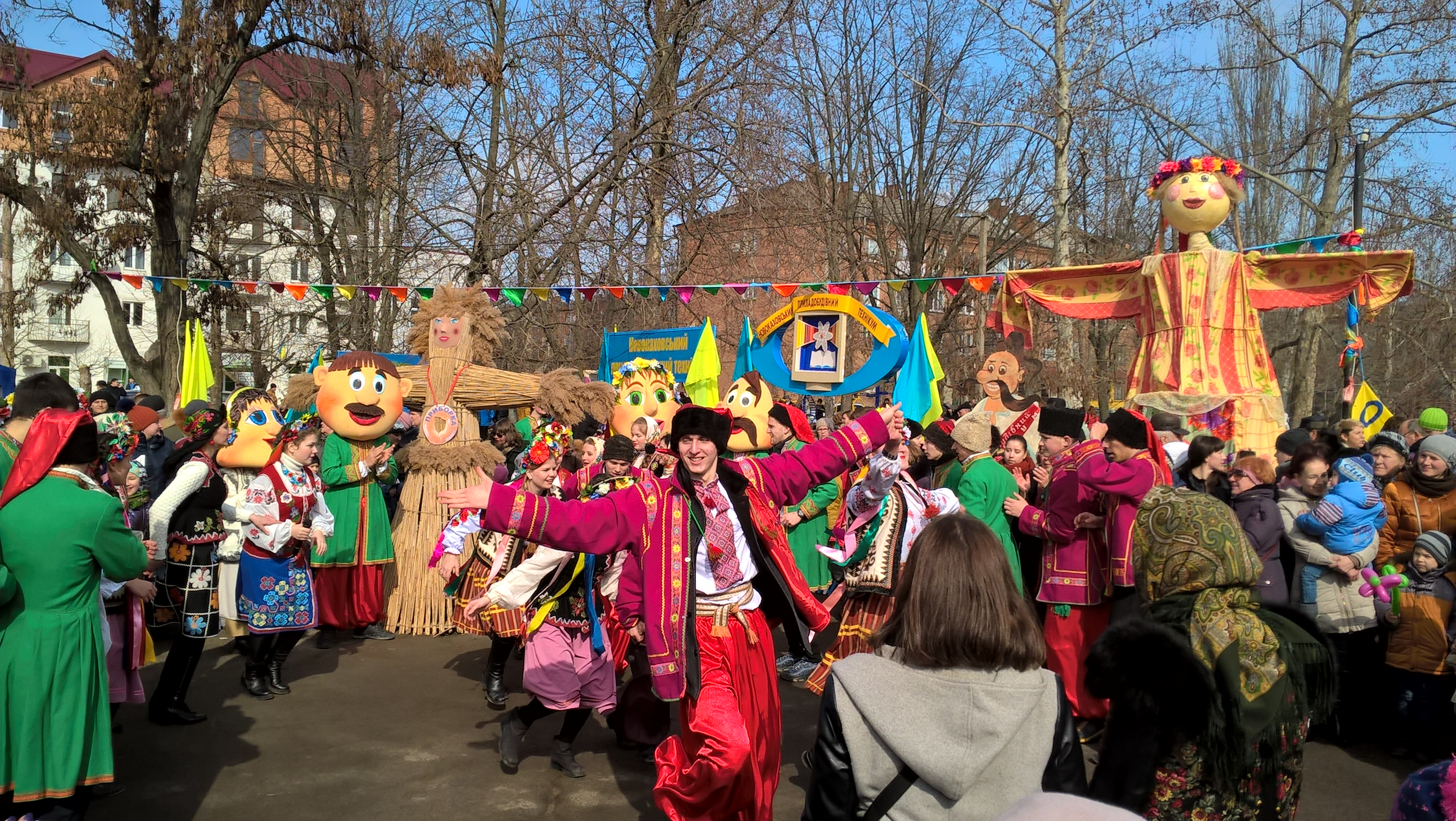
People in Nova Kakhovka in 2017

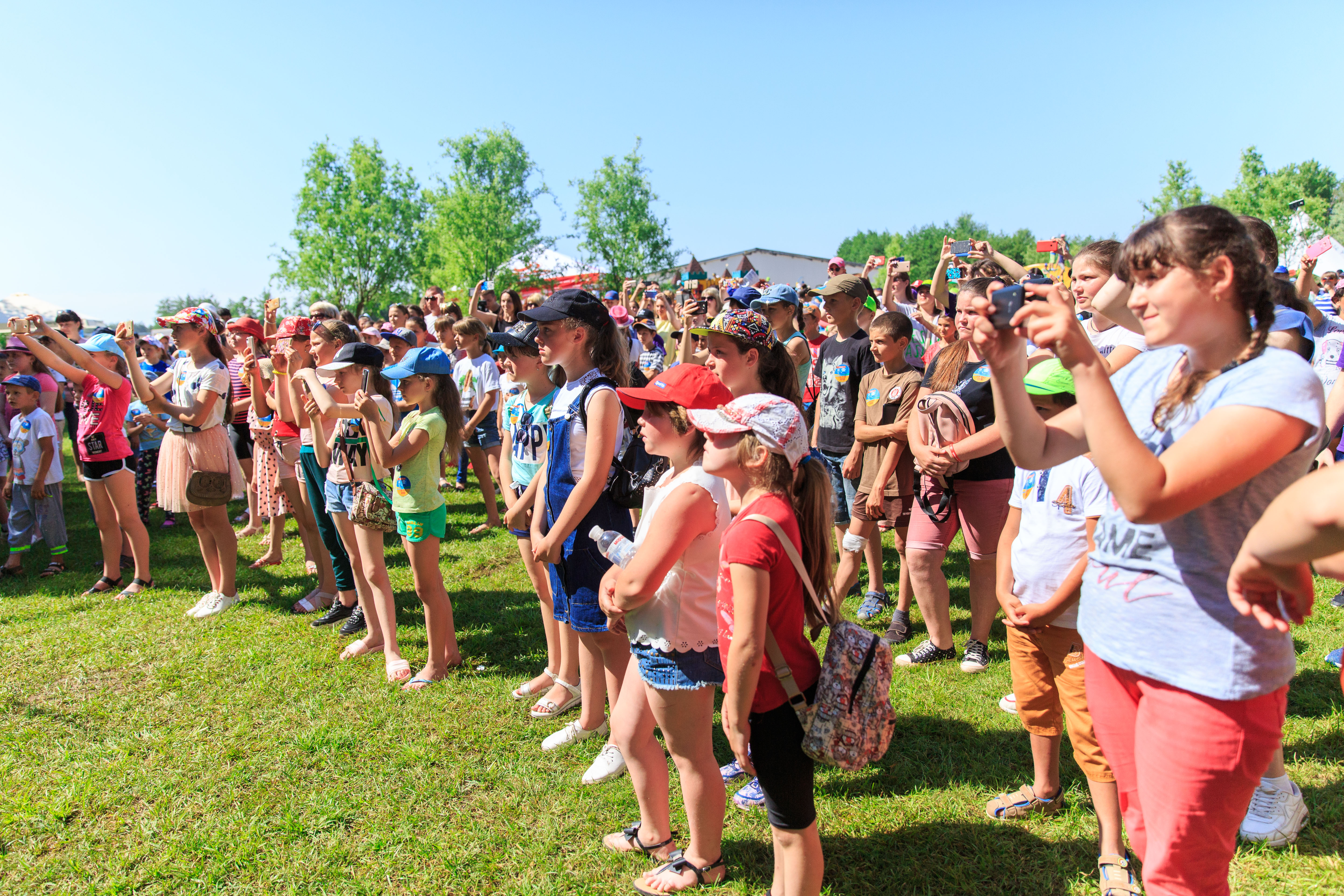
Children in Kherson Oblast in 2019

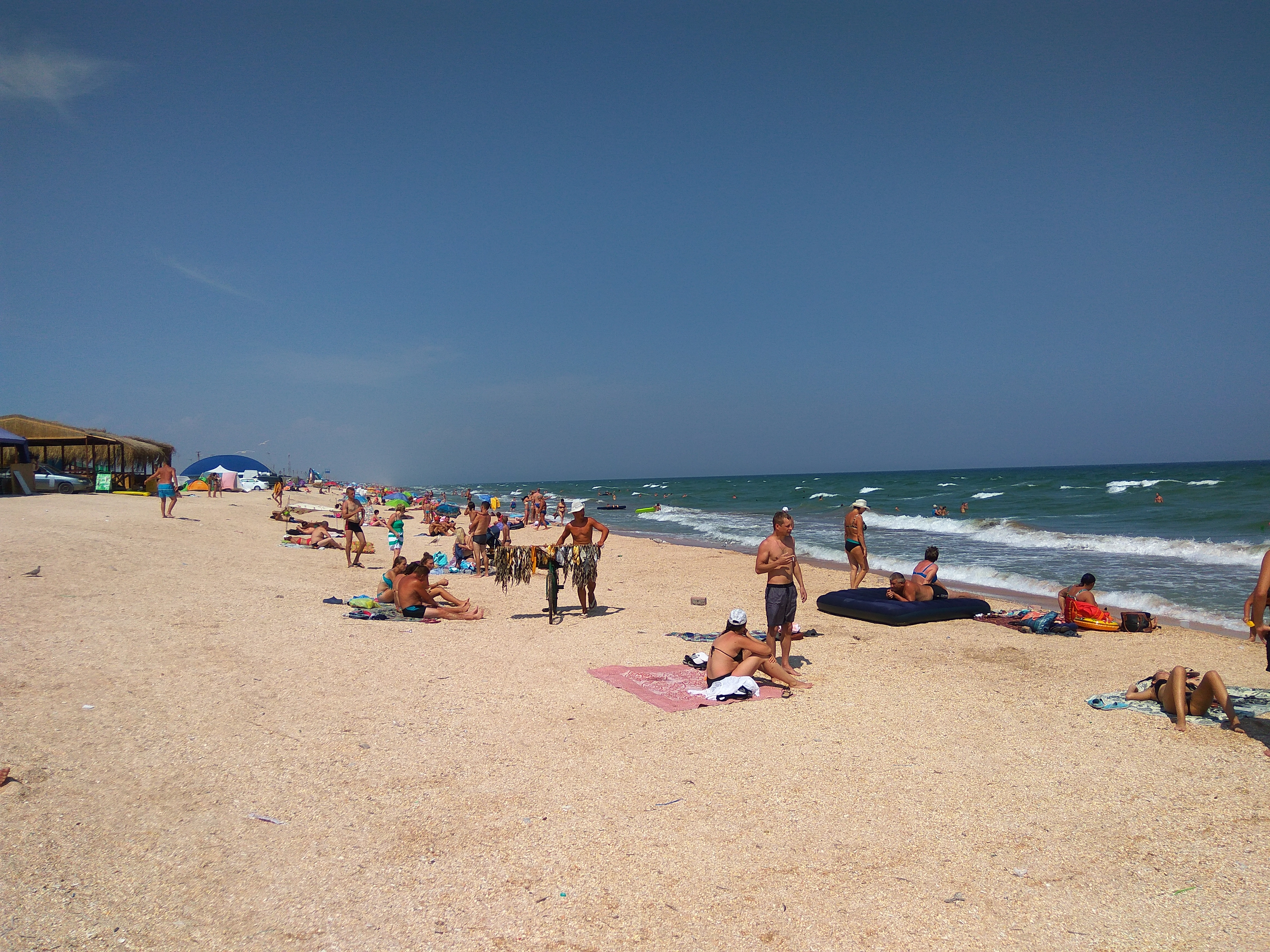
People in the resort village of Shchaslyvtseve in 2016

Historical population
Year	Pop.	±%
1970	1,029,988	—
1979	1,163,435	+13.0%
1989	1,239,969	+6.6%
2001	1,175,122	−5.2%
2011	1,088,237	−7.4%
2022	1,001,598	−8.0%

The population of the oblast is 1,083,367 (2012), which is 2.4% of the total population of Ukraine. It is ranked 21st by its population. The population density is 38 per km^{2}.

About 61.5% or 745,400 people live in urban areas and 38.5% or 467,600 live in agricultural centers/villages. Men make up 46.7% or 565,400 people of the population, women make up 53.3% or 644,600 people, and pensioners make up 26.2% or 317,400 people.

Ukrainian census (2001):

- Ukrainians – 82.0%
- Russians – 14.1%
- Belarusians – 0.7%
- Meskhetian Turks – 0.5%
- Crimean Tatars – 0.5%
- Others – 2.2%

Age structure

0–14 years: 15.1% ▲ (male 83,397/female 79,303)
15–64 years: 70.5% ▼ (male 364,907/female 393,933)
65 years and over: 14.4% (male 50,404/female 104,856) (2013 official)

Median age

total: 39.5 years ▲
male: 36.2 years ▲
female: 42.7 years ▲ (2013 official)

== Attractions ==
- Askania-Nova
- Lake Lemuria

== Gallery ==
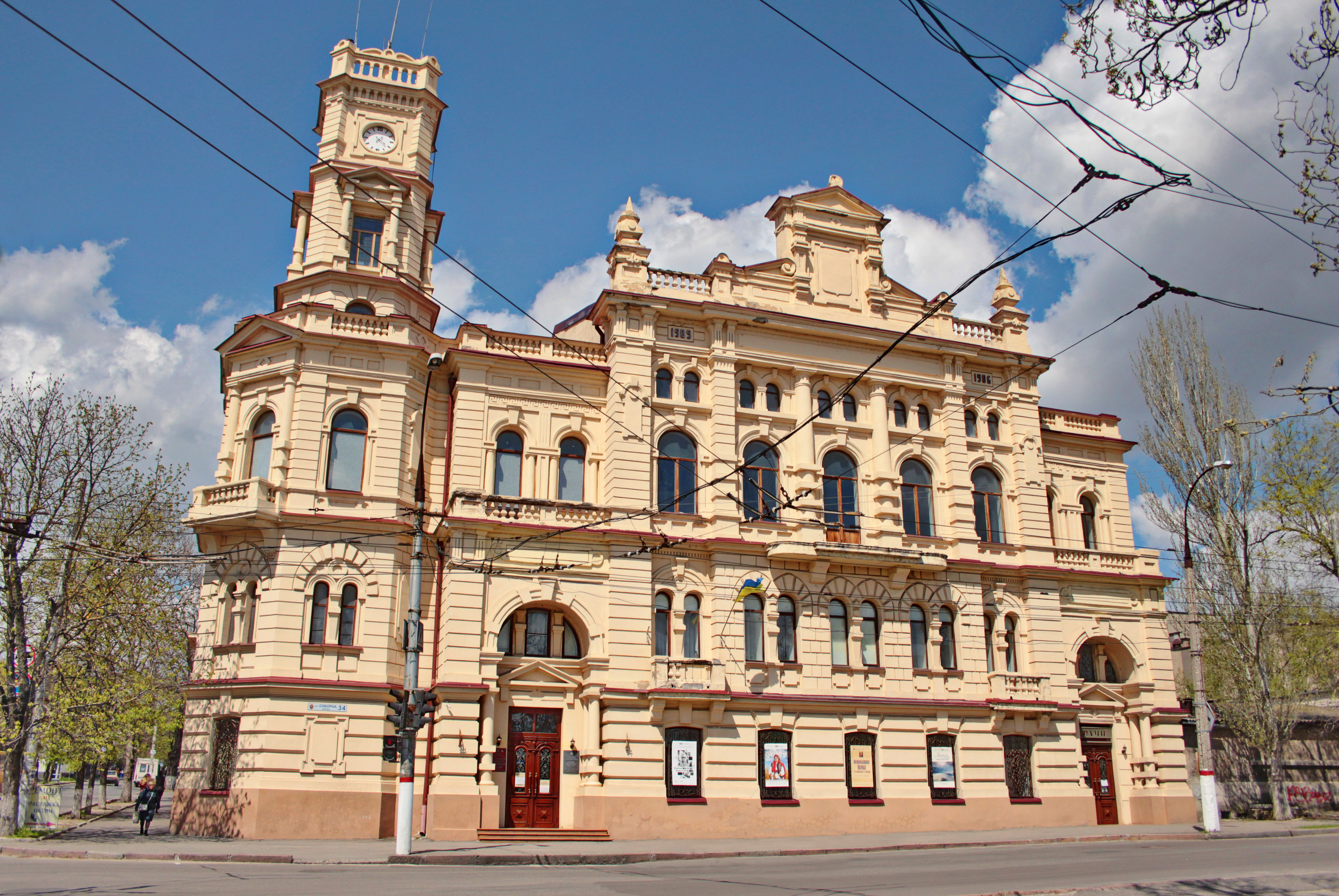
The building of the former Kherson City Duma

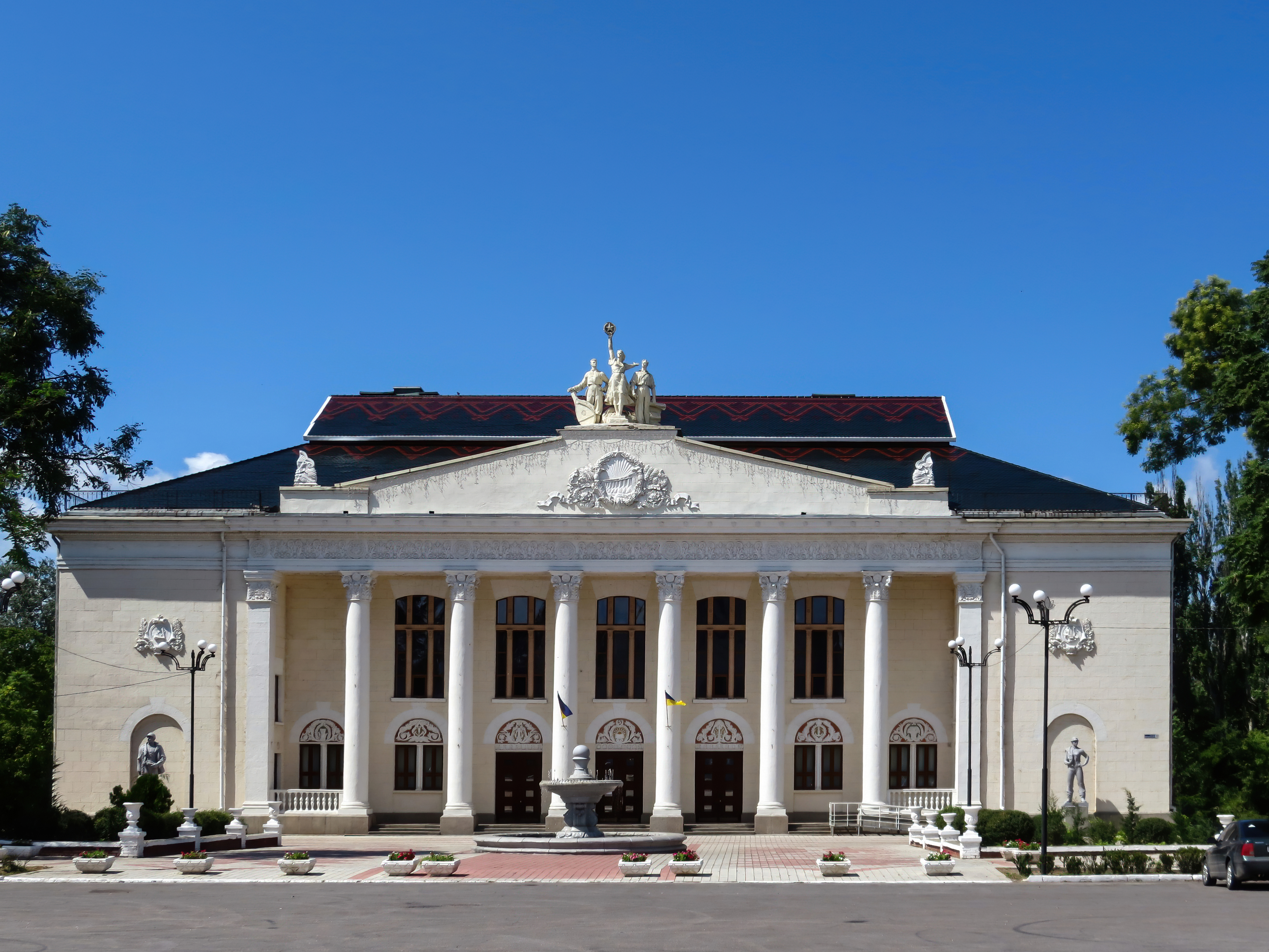
Palace of Culture, Nova Kakhovka

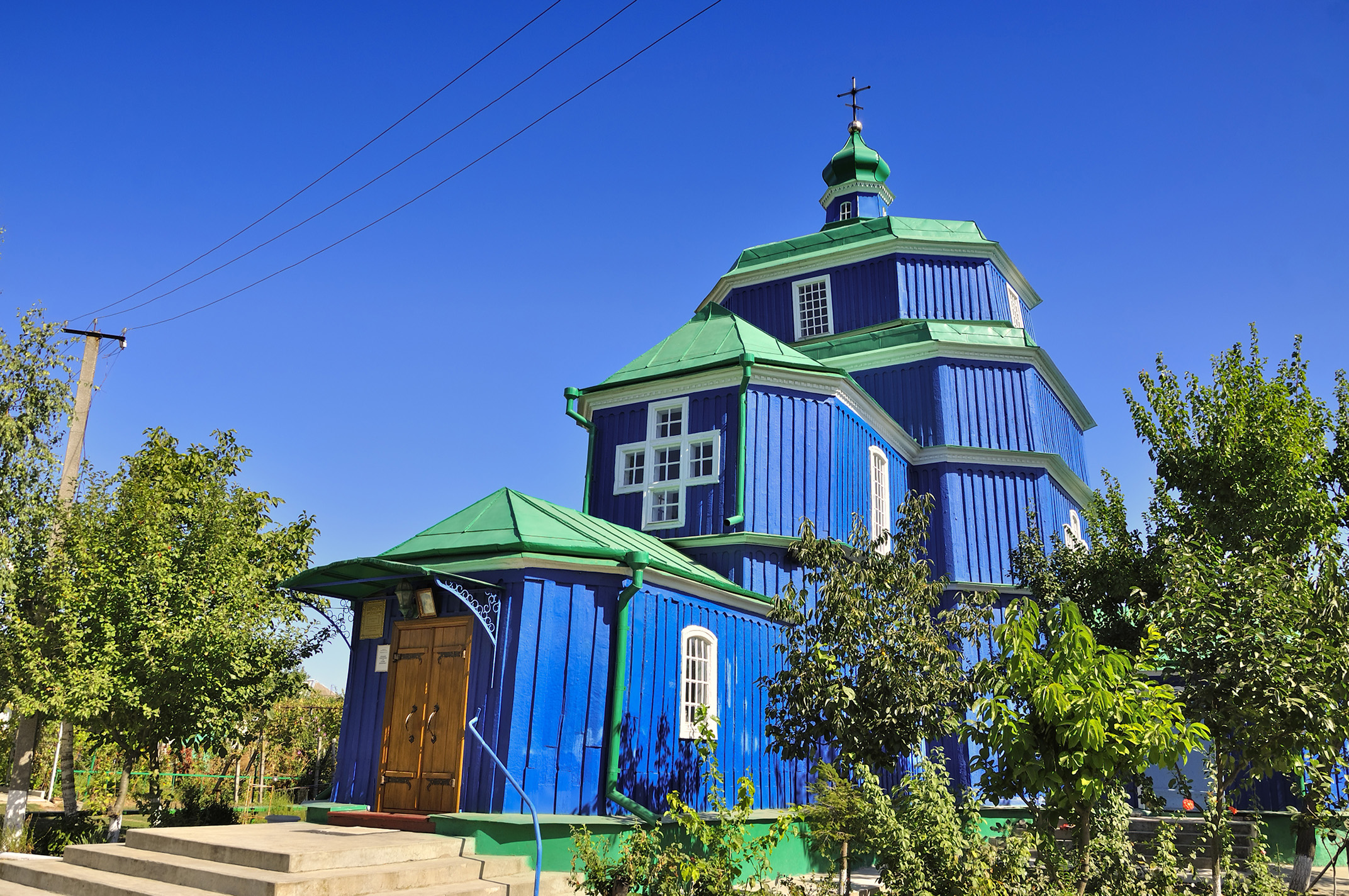
Church of the Presentation of Mary, Beryslav

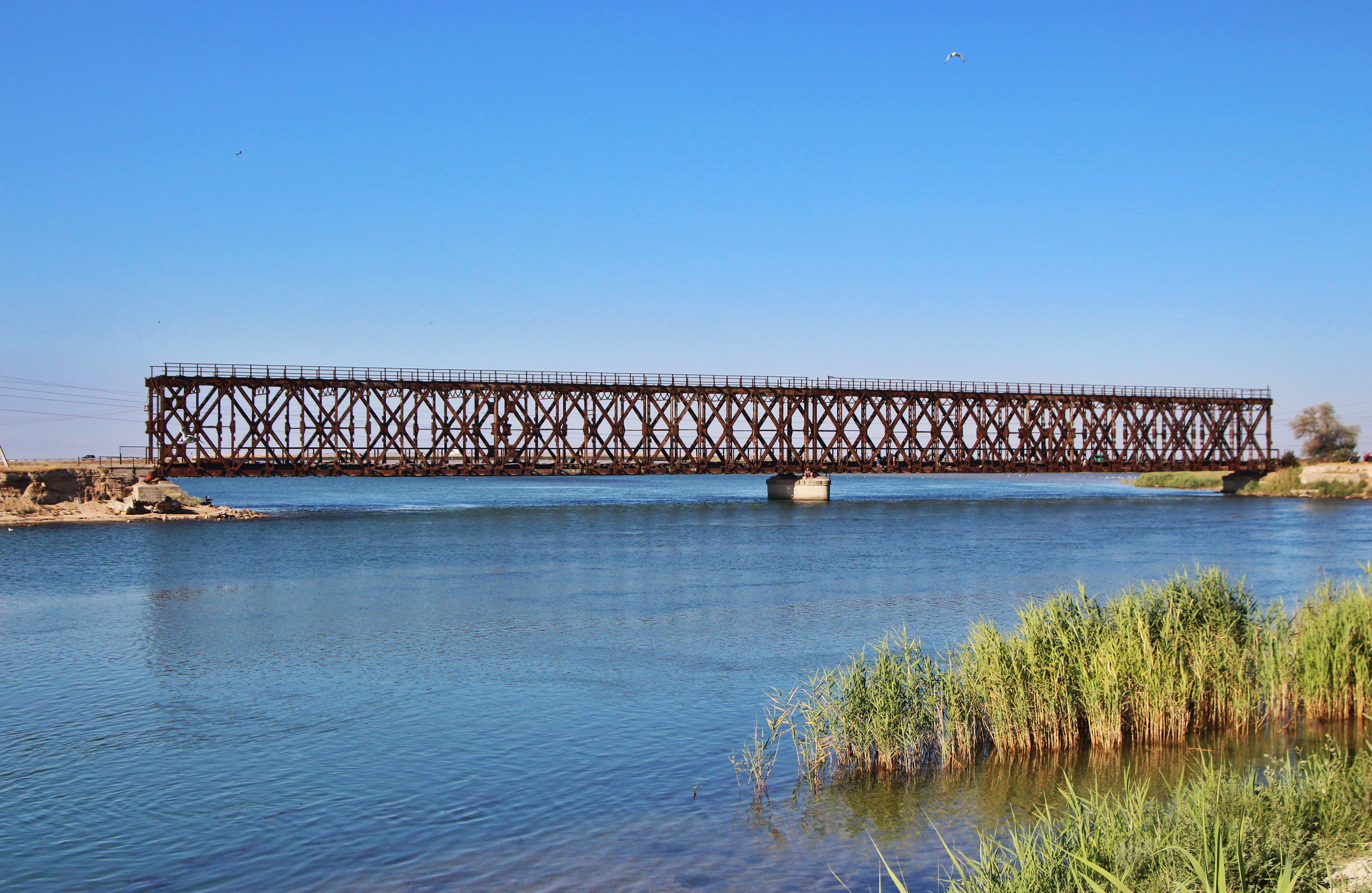
Henichesk Bridge

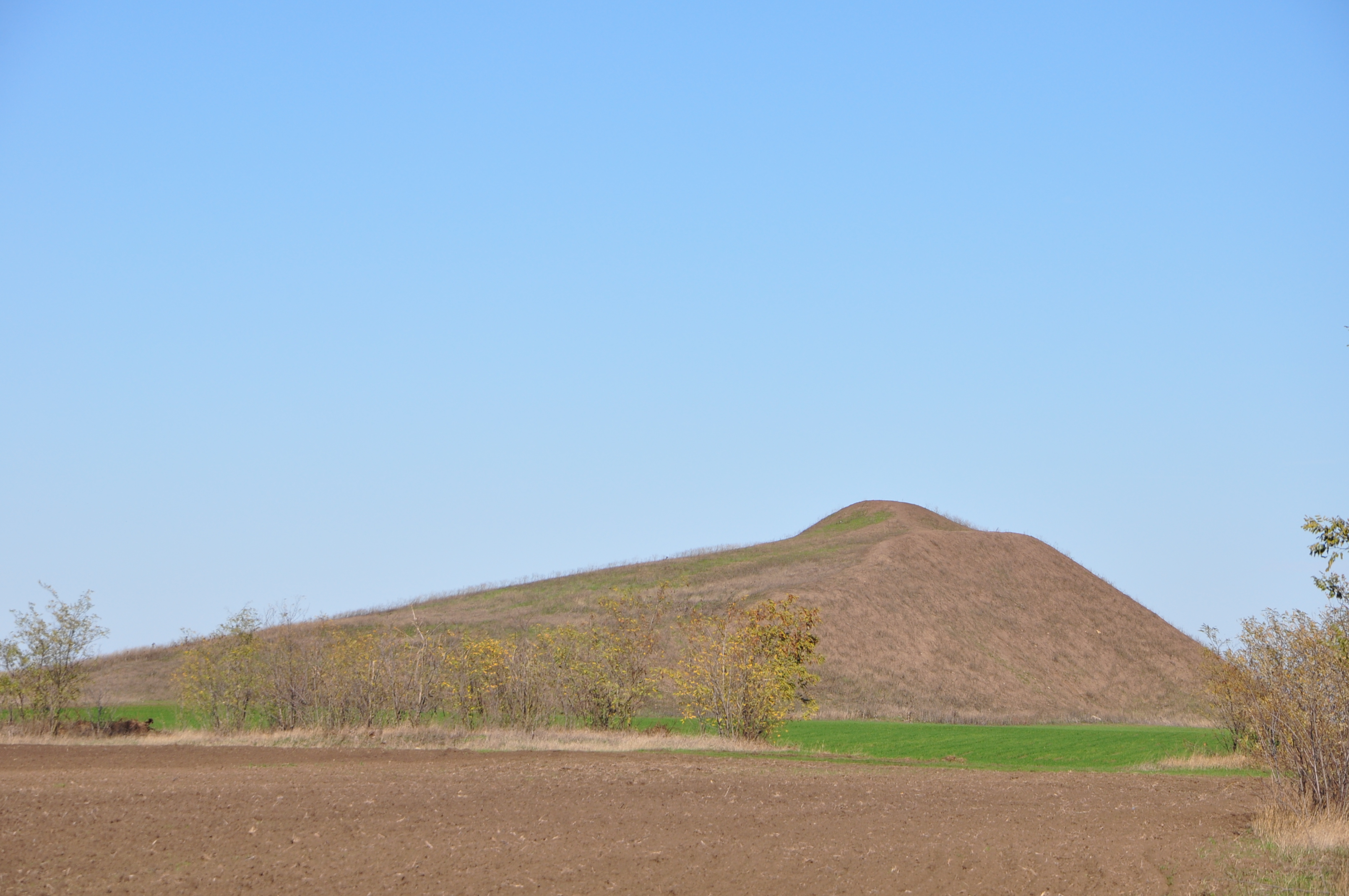
Ohuz Kurgan

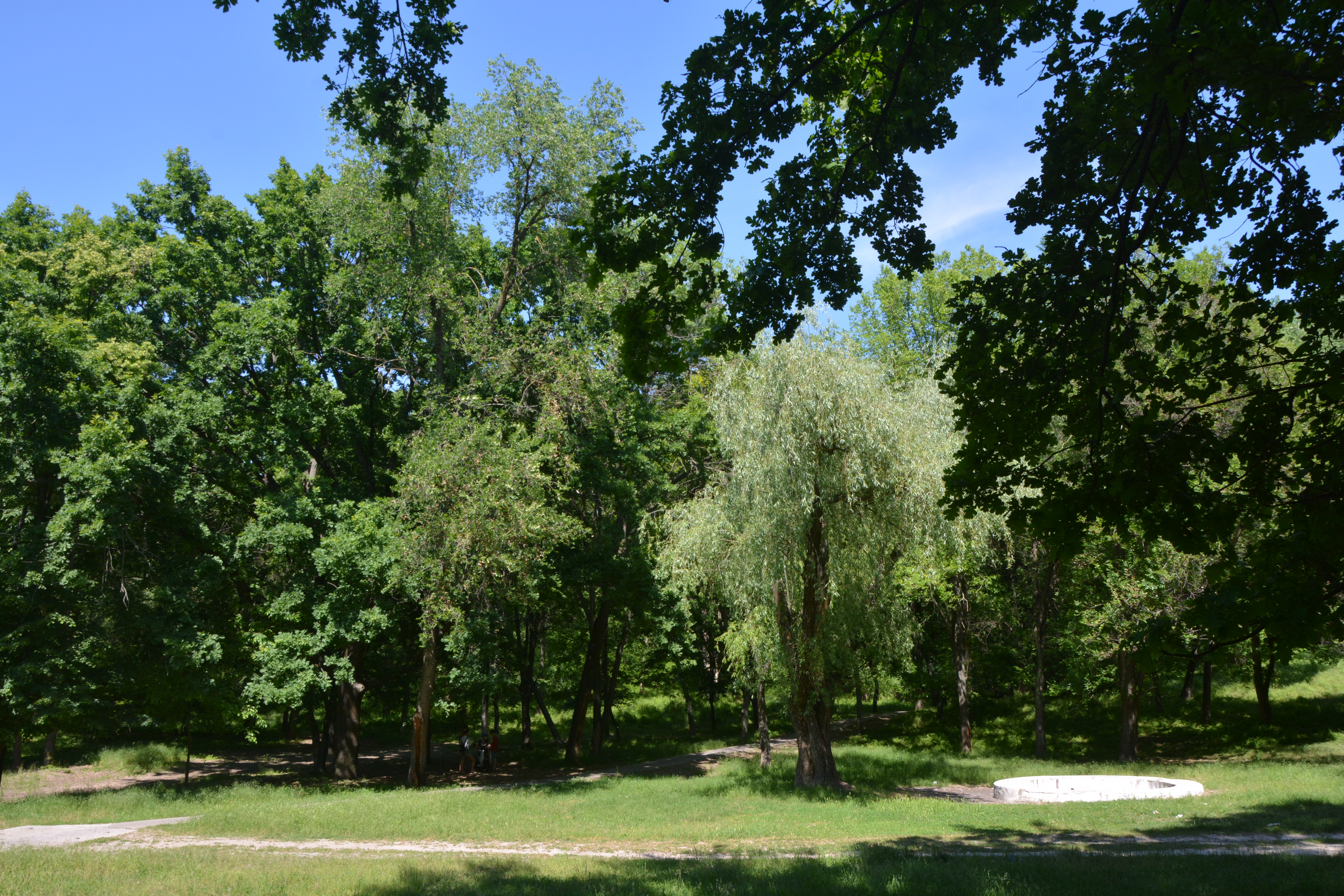
Kakhovka Arboretum

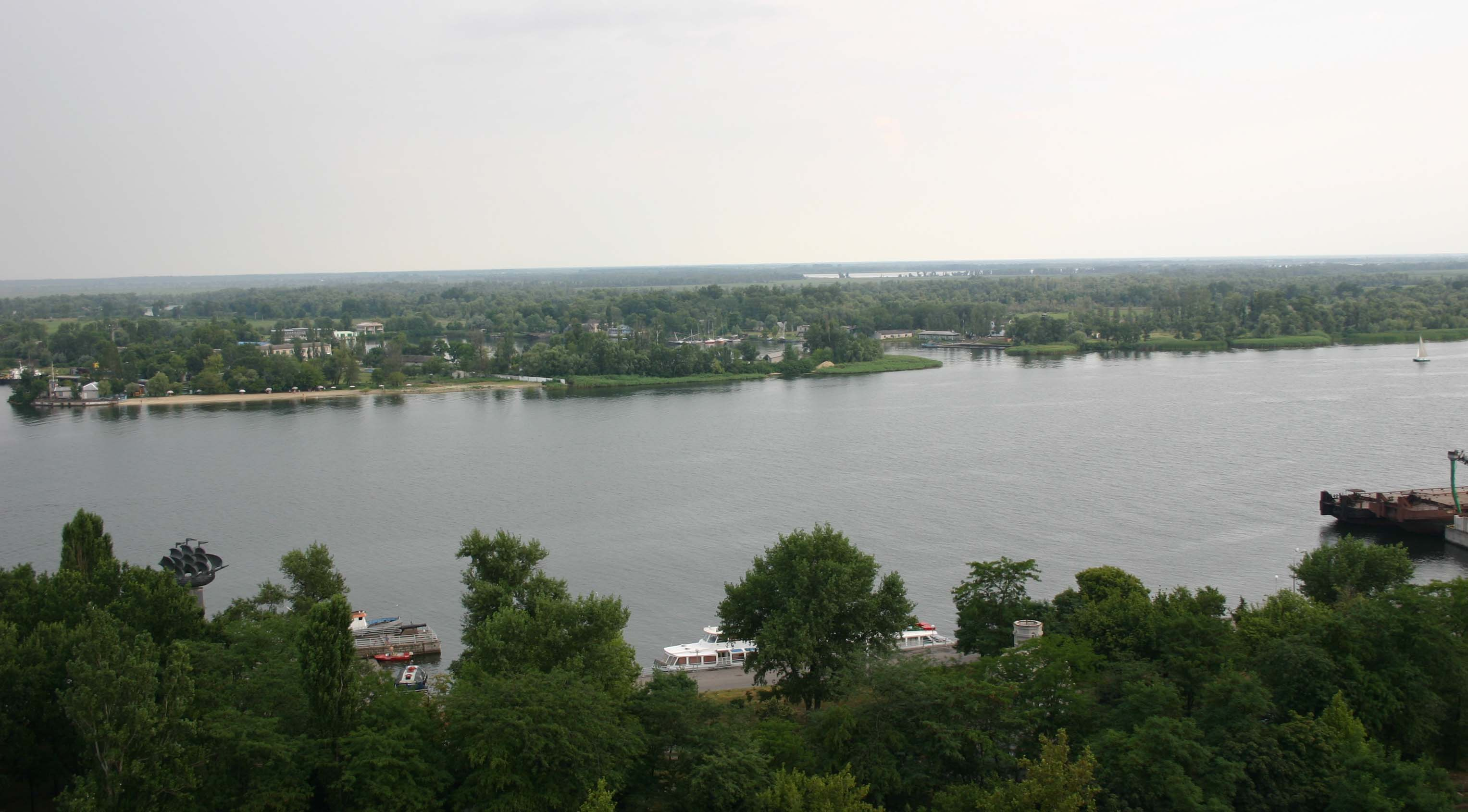
The Dnieper River in Kherson

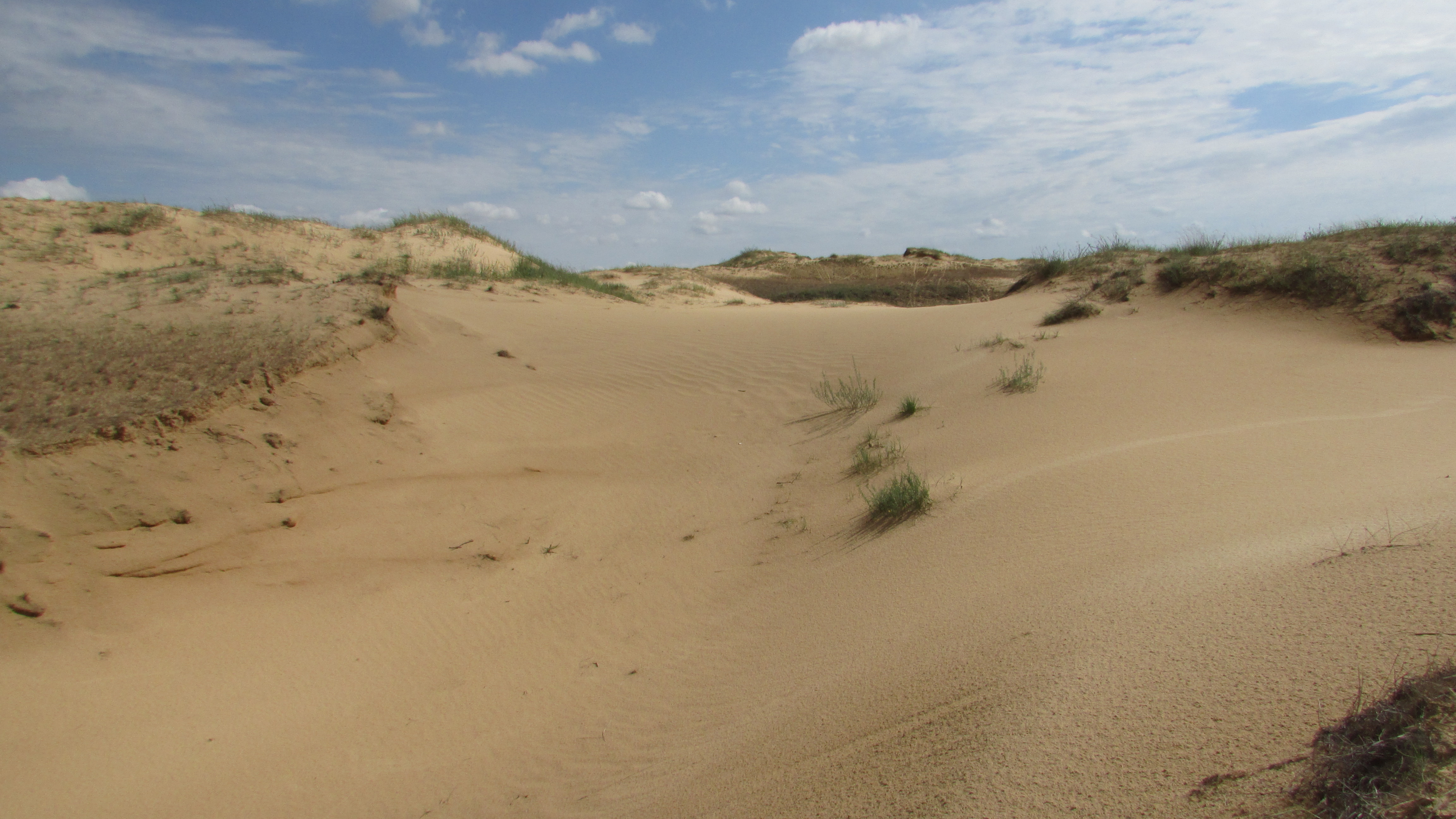
Oleshky Sands near Radensk

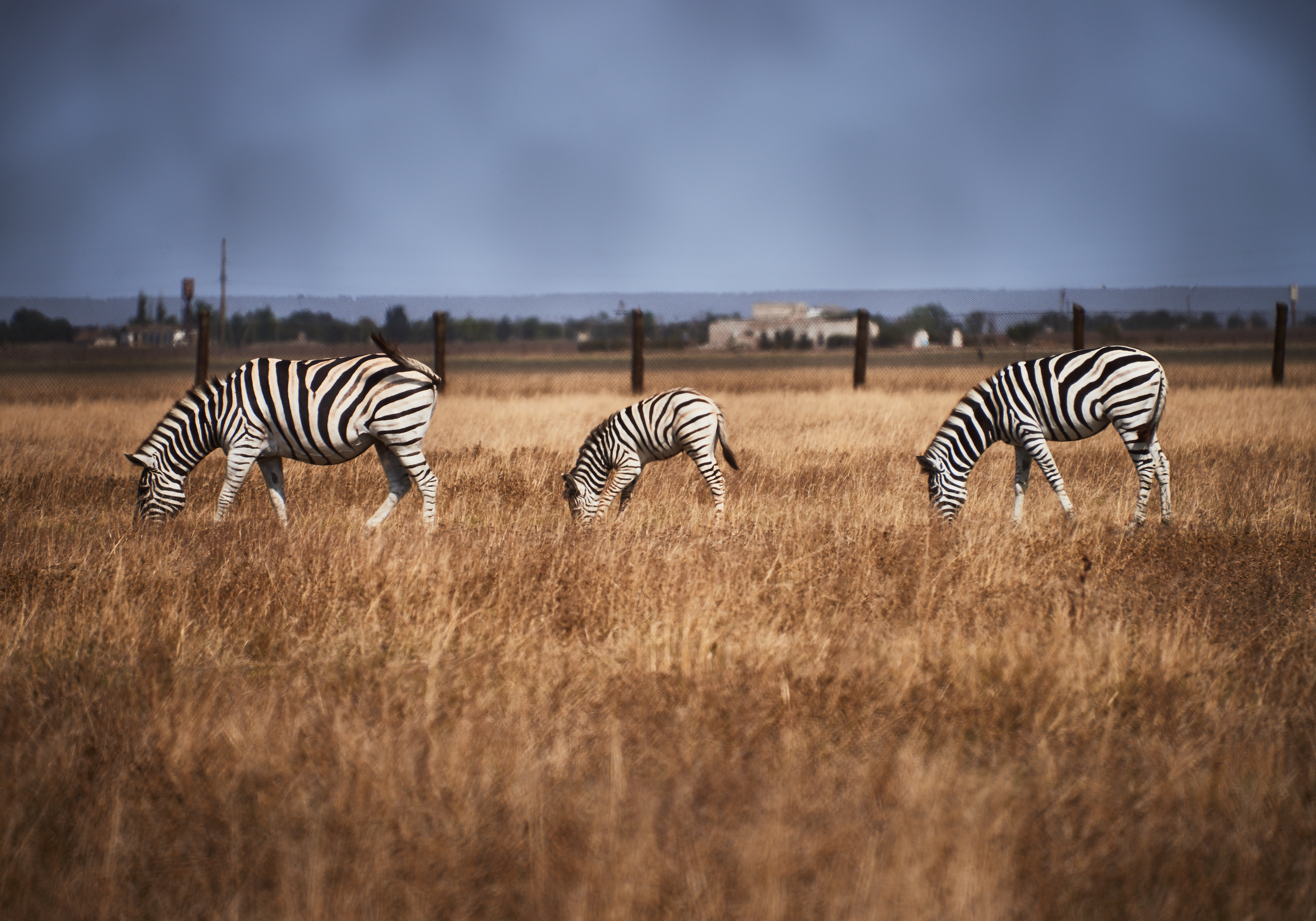
Askania-Nova

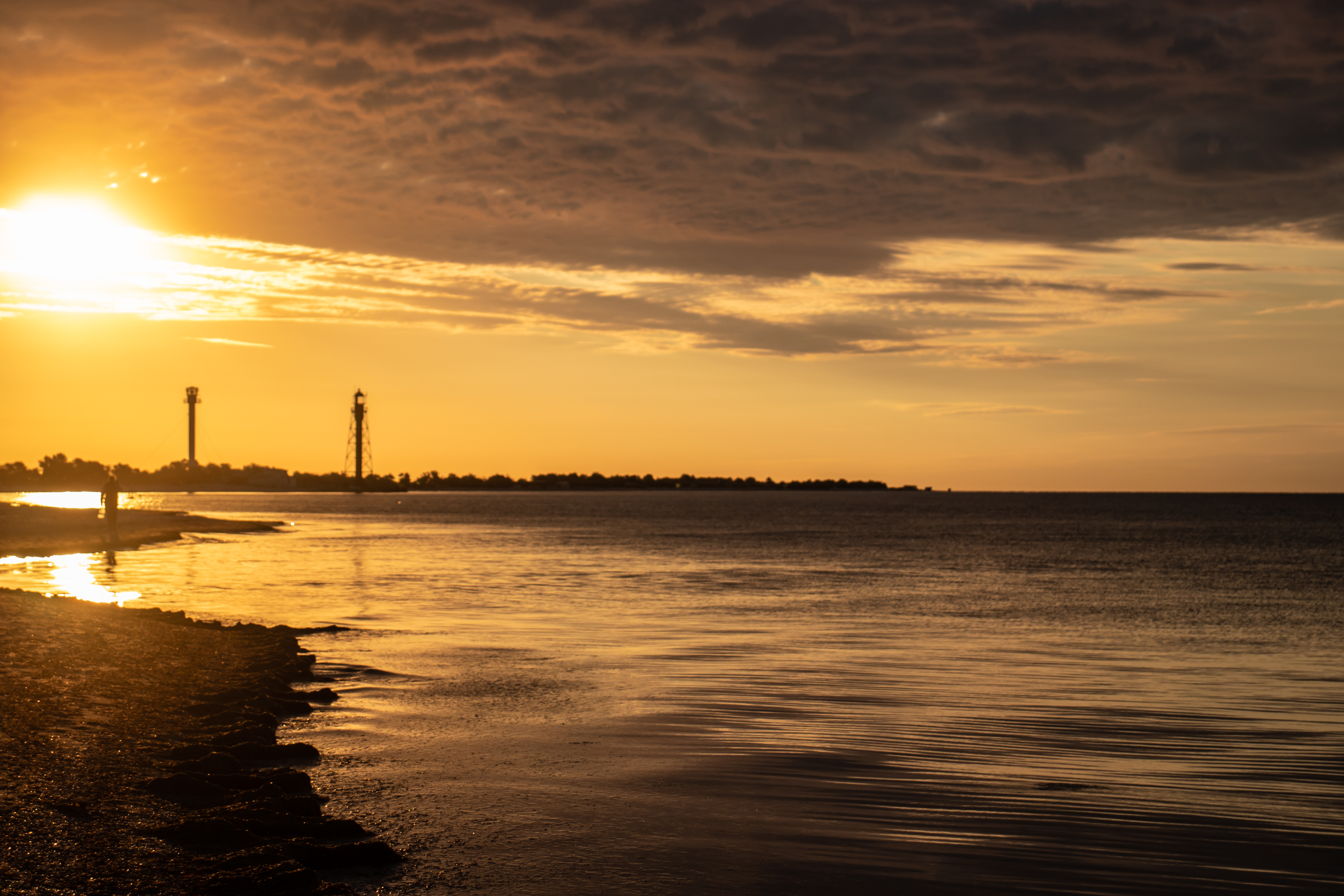
The Dzharylhach Lighthouse

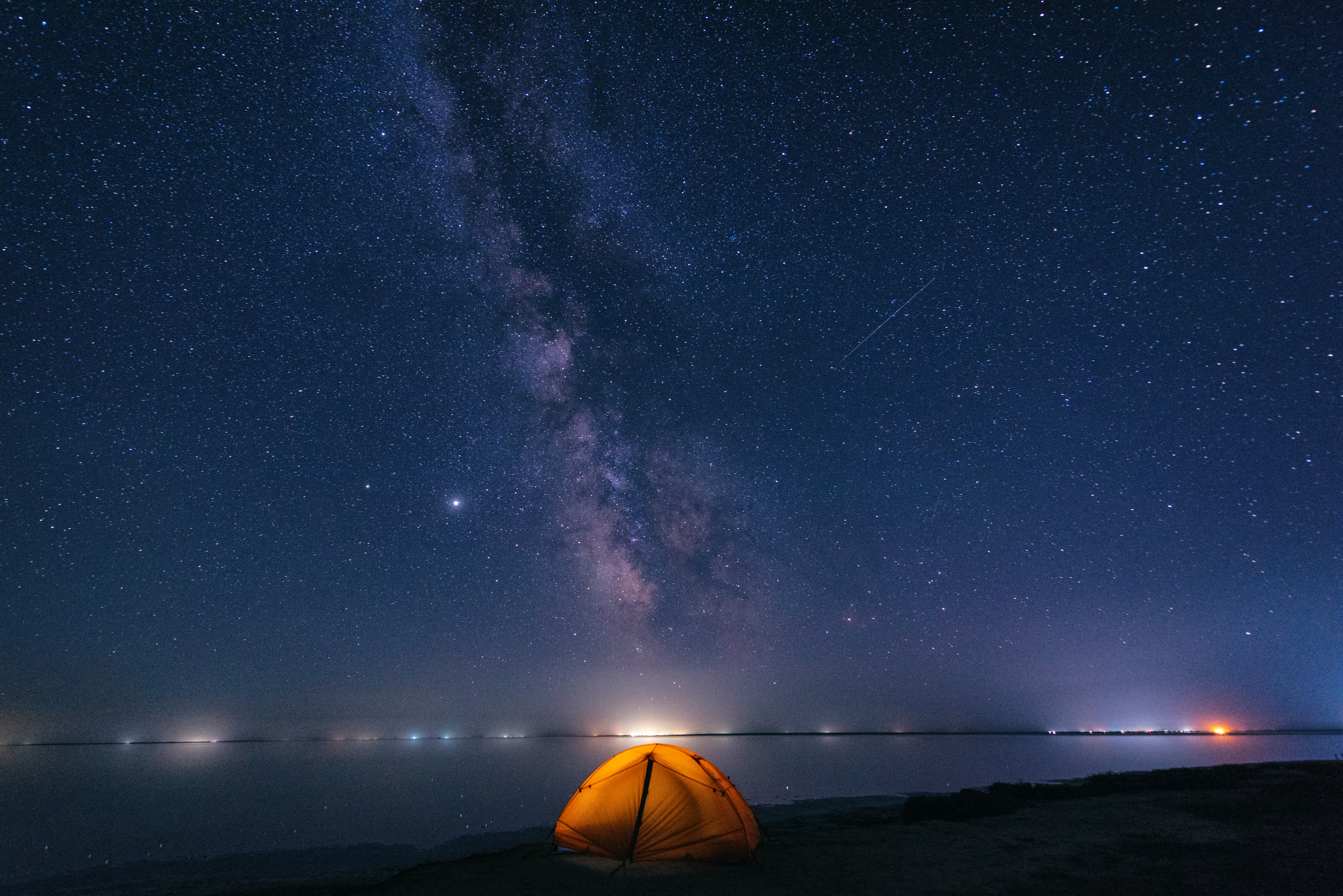
Lake Syvash at night

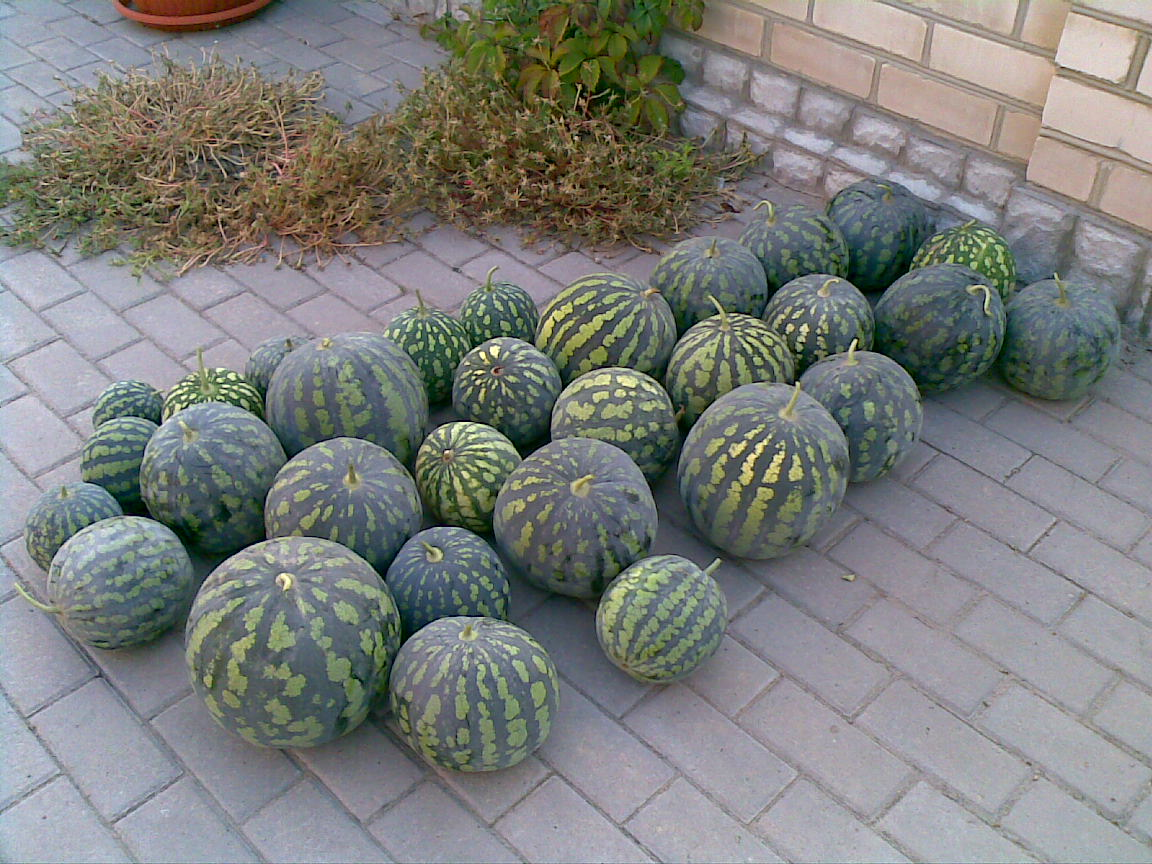
Kherson watermelons

== See also ==
- Kherson Governorate
- List of cities in Kherson Oblast
- Subdivisions of Ukraine
