= Atesh =

Military movement in occupied Ukraine

- Атеш, Ateş
- Atesh logo
- Political leader: Mustafa Dzhemilev
- Founded: September 2022
- Dates active: 2022–present
- Country: Ukraine; Russia
- Ideology: Crimean Tatar nationalism Ukrainian nationalism Anti-imperialism; Anti-Putinism
- Political position: Big tent
- Website: Atesh on Telegram

Atesh (Crimean Tatar: Ateş, lit. 'Fire'; Russian and Ukrainian: Атеш) is a partisan armed movement in the occupied territories of Ukraine, and in the territory of Russia, created by Ukrainians and Crimean Tatars in September 2022 as a result of the Russian military invasion of Ukraine.

== History ==
The movement was founded at the end of September 2022. On September 26, the oath of the soldier "Atesh" was published on the official Telegram channel, and on September 29, a video appeal of one of the partisans was made public with an appeal to join the group.

=== Armed activities ===
==== 2022 ====
November 11: Partisans of the movement claimed they killed 30 Russian servicemen in hospitals in Simferopol.

December 11: Atesh took responsibility for setting fire to barracks with Russian soldiers in the village Sovietske.

==== 2023 ====
January 31: Partisans claim they killed two Russian National Guard officers.

February 10: Atesh claimed responsibility for a car bomb attack that resulted in the deaths of two Russian soldiers and the hospitalisation of two others in occupied Nova Kakhovka.

March 14: Atesh claimed to have killed the deputy head of the military administration of Nova Kakhovka in a bomb attack.

April 23: Atesh claim to have blown up a Russian National Guard checkpoint near Oleshky resulting in multiple deaths.

April 27: Partisans claim they killed two Russian soldiers in the village of Velyki Kopani.

May 6: Partisans claimed responsibility for an assassination attempt of Zakhar Prilepin, a Russian writer and member of the A Just Russia — For Truth Party, in which a car bomb exploded as he crossed the Russian border from occupied Donbas. The car's driver was killed and Prilepin was seriously wounded, but survived.

July 14: Partisans claimed responsibility for an ambush in Kherson that destroyed two Russian military trucks and killed 6 Russian military personnel.

July 17: The Guardian interviewed Mustafa Dzhemilev in Kyiv about Atesh. He reported that Atesh maintains an online class for Russian draftees to carry out acts of sabotage claiming that 4,000 Russian troops have enrolled. He also claims that upwards of 1,000 Tatars would be willing to take up arms against Russian forces in Crimea, if they were just given the arms to do so. Dzemilev also stated that he hopes that after the liberation of Crimea there will be an amendment to the Constitution of Ukraine to turn Crimea into an autonomous "National Republic" with the Tatars as its indigenous people with special status.

August 30: Atesh claimed responsibility for bombing a United Russia campaign office in Nova Kakhovka killing three Russian guards, and destroyed documents supporting the upcoming September 2023 regional elections.

September 25: Atesh claimed that they provided information used to plan Operation Crab Trap. They reportedly gained leaked information about the Black Sea Fleet by bribing Russian officers disgruntled by missed salary payments.

==== 2024 ====
May 25: Atesh claimed responsibility for a sabotage attack near Yaroslavl. According to Atesh, an agent destroyed equipment at a substation.

July 5: Agents of Atesh managed to carry out a successful operation on the Trans-Siberian Railway near Yekaterinburg, resulting in the destruction of the railway track along which North Korean ammunition was being transported.

==== 2025 ====
February 15: Atesh fighters sabotaged a Russian RP-377LA electronic warfare vehicle by pouring sugar into its fuel tank.

April 24: Believed to be Atesh operatives firebombed a Russian Su-30SM at the Rostov-on-Don airfield with tail number 35.

May 8: the Ukrainian partisan group Atesh claimed responsibility for a sabotage attack near Moscow, disrupting communications of several Russian military units. According to Atesh, an agent destroyed equipment at a substation in Mogiltsy.

June 1: Atesh fighters undertook a sabotage operation on a railway in Donetsk Oblast, during Operation Spider's Web on the same day.

September 21: Atesh carried out a sabotage operation in the Russian city of Smolensk, targeting a railway line leading to a major aviation plant involved in missile and drone production.

==== 2026 ====
May 21: Atesh partisans set fire to a diesel locomotive in Saint Petersburg transporting oil.

June 20: Atesh partisans carried out a sabotage operation, damaging the substation of the Atlant-Aero defense plant in Taganrog.

== See also ==
- Ukrainian resistance in Russian-occupied Ukraine
- 2022 protests in Russian-occupied Ukraine
- Popular Resistance of Ukraine
- Berdiansk Partisan Army
