= Yellow Ribbon (movement) =

Resistance movement in Ukraine

- Жовта стрічка
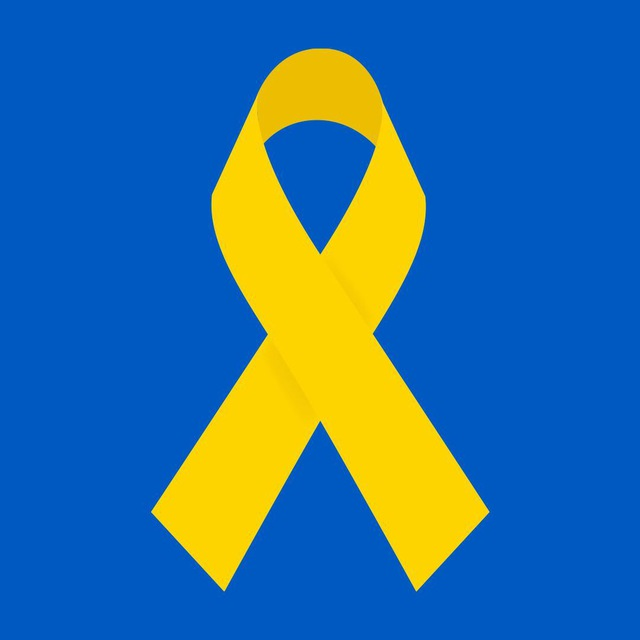
- Yellow Ribbon Logo
- Founded: 25 April 2022
- Dates active: 2022–present
- Country: Ukraine
- Ideology: Ukrainian nationalism Anti-imperialism; Anti-Putinism
- Political position: Big tent
- Website: zhovtastrichka.org

The Yellow Ribbon (Ukrainian: Жовта стрічка, romanized: Žovta strička) is a resistance movement in the occupied territories of Ukraine. Created in April 2022 after the Russian military invasion, the goal of the movement is resisting the Russian occupation of Ukraine.

== History ==
=== April–June ===
In April 2022, the "Yellow Ribbon" public resistance movement emerged in the territories occupied by Russia. On April 25, on a Telegram channel, the coordinators of the movement called on residents to hang Ukrainian flags and yellow ribbons on the streets and in crowded places. On the same day, yellow ribbons appeared in occupied Kherson.

On 27 April, "Yellow Ribbon" held a peaceful action called "Kherson is Ukraine" in Kherson. About 500 people took to the streets of the city; four of them were injured. According to the organizers, the rally became an impetus for the development of the movement. Subsequently, yellow ribbons began to appear in Oleshky, Melitopol, Nova Kakhovka, Berdiansk, Yalta, Simferopol, Kerch, Saky, Donetsk, Luhansk, Henichesk, Alushta, and other cities and villages in the occupied territories.

On June 17, the movement held an online rally in support of Kherson on Instagram. The campaign gathered 36,000 people, 75,000 likes, and almost 20,000 shares.

=== July ===
On July 4, the start of the "Stop the Referendum" open-ended campaign was announced. The goal is to disrupt the maximum number of referendums in the occupied territories. The next day, leaflets against referendums appeared in Kherson, Donetsk, Melitopol, Luhansk, and Berdiansk.

On July 7, "Yellow Ribbon" announced the start of the open-ended campaign "Crimea - time to go home". The organizers called on Crimean activists to report data on the movement of Russian troops to the YeVorog Telegram bot, hang yellow ribbons, and send patriotic postcards saying "Crimea is Ukraine. Not only since 1954. But always!", "08/24/2022. Crimea is ready" and "Time to fight! Time to resist! Time to go home". On 13 July, the resistance movement called on the residents of Donetsk and Luhansk regions to block the referendum, hang yellow ribbons, and transmit information about the movement of enemy troops and collaborators to the "eVorog" platform. In addition, activists in Donbas were urged to post leaflets saying "24.08.2022. Donetsk is ready" and "24.08.2022. Luhansk is ready".

On July 26, the letter "Ї" became the new symbol of the movement. Coordinators were urged to mark buildings where the referendum can take place:

«We once wrote that we were calling for marking the buildings where the referendum could be held with the letter "Ї", but the people of Kherson gave us a better idea. Our letter "Ї" is unique, it is the only one in the world and emphasizes the beauty of our language. Therefore, we call on all our activists and supporters to mark with the letter "Ї" all buildings where a referendum can be held, all buildings where collaborators and occupiers are sitting».

On the same day, the letter began to appear in the form of graffiti in the precincts. In addition, "Ї" soon became one of the symbols of the resistance of Ukrainians in the temporarily occupied territories.

On July 30, "Yellow Ribbon" began offering a monetary reward for information about the activities of the occupiers. The next day, the movement called for information as a reward about the locations where the Russian invaders rest—restaurants and cafes.

=== August ===
On August 3, in partnership with the Mariupol City Council, the "Yellow Ribbon" movement launched an online rally, "Mariupol is Ukraine" on Instagram. The action lasted until August 22.

On August 5, the movement published "love letters" — warm lines from Ukrainians with words of support for the residents of the temporarily occupied territories.

On August 6, "Yellow Ribbon" launched the newspaper "Voice of the Partisan". The first edition consisted of 1,200 copies and was posted around Kherson. On 8 August, the newspaper began to be published in Crimea.

On August 7, the movement offered a reward of 10 bitcoins, or 230,000 US dollars at the time, for the arrest of Russian Crimean leader Sergey Aksyonov and information about his exact location.

In August, the campaign "Stop Referendum" became widespread. Leaflets with calls to boycott referendums and not take Russian passports began to be actively distributed in temporarily occupied settlements.

On August 23, a new open-ended flash mob called "Stop Rashism" was launched. The goal is to rip off and damage Russian leaflets, announcements, and symbols of the occupiers in the temporarily occupied territories.

On the same day in Kyiv, at the street exhibition "Infoprotiv", initiated by the "Chesno" movement in cooperation with the National Museum of the Revolution of Dignity, one of the boards was dedicated, among other things, to the activities of the "Yellow Ribbon".

On August 24, on the Independence Day of Ukraine, Ukrainian Railways launched the "Train to Victory" - 7 cars painted by Ukrainian artists. Each car is dedicated to a region of Ukraine and the exploits of people resisting the Russian occupiers. One of the cars is dedicated to the "Yellow Ribbon" movement.

On August 31, "Yellow Ribbon" called on residents of occupied territories not to participate in telephone surveys. The coordinators of the movement noted that this is one of the schemes of the occupiers to hold a referendum:

«The Rashists do not succeed in holding a pseudo-referendum, so they come up with new schemes to at least somehow hold a "referendum". One of these schemes is a "public survey", residents of TOT of Ukraine will be called by unknown subscribers from the Russian Federation, whose numbers start with +7».

In such cases, the movement advised people not to pick up the phone and cancel the call. They also noted that there is no need to communicate with these people because the very fact of communication can be interpreted by them as a positive response to the referendum.

=== September ===
In September, yellow ribbons, patriotic posters, and graffiti continued to appear on the streets of the cities of the occupied territories. In particular, from September 8 to 10, during the counteroffensive in the Kharkiv region of the Armed Forces of Ukraine, the movement intensified in occupied Vovchansk. On September 11, the city was liberated from the Russian occupation.

On September 14, in occupied Kherson, Nova Kakhovka, Skadovsk, Kyrylivka, Tokmak, and Ivanovka, "Yellow Ribbon" held an action to collect signatures in support of the Armed Forces of Ukraine. For the safety of residents, activists asked to use an alternative signature. In a few hours, around 1,000 signatures were collected.

On September 17, the movement called on residents of the occupied territories to send photos and videos of Russian collaborators, equipment, and campaign products, as well as streets, administrative buildings, and banks Russian collaborators used.

On September 19, during another posting of leaflets in occupied Simferopol, the movement pasted leaflets with the inscriptions "Opening soon!" and "Crimea is Ukraine!" on the building of Presidential representative of Ukraine in Crimea.

On September 20, "Yellow Ribbon" responded to the statements of Russian authorities about holding referendums in the occupied territories:

«You have all heard today's statements by the Rashists about holding a referendum. All these are just "statements" and an attempt to intimidate us, but is it possible to intimidate a country that repels the 2nd army of the world? Exactly not».

Activists assured that "referendums will not change Ukraine" and published an article in which they explained why their holding will not change anything.

On September 21, during the preparations of the occupiers for the holding of the referendums, the movement called on the public to disrupt them by all means: to mark the buildings in which the referendums can be held with the letter "Ї", as well as to give the operators information about their holding and the participants (lists, names, photo, video, etc).

On September 23, "Yellow Ribbon" together with the Ukrainian IT community began recording the participants of referendums. On the same day, activists published data on the locations of the referendums, as well as personal data of the "chairmen of election commissions" in the Kherson, Luhansk, and Zaporizhzhia oblasts. In addition, the movement called on the residents of the occupied territories to completely ignore the referendums and in no case open the door to strangers.

=== October–January ===
On October 19, the "Yellow Ribbon" movement, together with other fighters for Ukrainian integrity, received the Andrii Sakharov Prize from the European Parliament for "For Freedom of Thought" - the main award of the European Union in the field of human rights.

In November, after the liberation of Kherson by the Armed Forces of Ukraine, "Yellow Ribbon" on the Telegram channel declassified the names of some Kherson activists in the movement that resisted the Russian occupation. Subsequently, the movement continued its activities in other temporarily occupied territories.

On November 21, the Day of Dignity and Freedom of Ukraine, the movement organized a flash mob "#ЖовтаСтрічка" ("#ZhovtaStrichka") on social networks. Participants were encouraged to tie a yellow ribbon and publish a post with the corresponding hashtag. Ukrainians and foreigners from all over the world joined the action, in particular, a considerable number of politicians, musicians, sportsmen, and scientists wore yellow ribbons. In addition, the symbol of public resistance appeared at the Mission of Ukraine to the European Union in Brussels and at the Ukrainian Antarctic station Vernadsky Research Base.

In the first week of 2023, "Yellow Ribbon" distributed more than 500 patriotic leaflets on the territory of occupied Crimea. Activists also called on residents of the occupied territories to join the movement, print and distribute posters, as well as send photos of the activities of the movement chatbot "Together" on Telegram.

== Ban in Russia ==
On 12 November 2026, the Supreme Court of Russia designated the "Yellow Ribbon" movement as an "extremist organisation" and banned its activities in Russia. The lawsuit that initiated this process was filed by Aleksandr Gutsan, the Prosecutor General of Russia, on 26 October 2026. During the closed-door ruling on 12 November, the court granted Gutsan's request and accused the movement of operating under the financial support of Ukrainian intelligence services and obtaining external funding from countries that are part of Russia's unfriendly countries list. The court also claimed the organisation "threatened Russia's territorial integrity" and posed risks to public security. In accordance with the ruling, under Article 282.2 of the Criminal Code of Russia, organising an extremist organisation's activities, while it is designated as such, carries a sentence of 6 to 10 years in prison, while participating in it carries a sentence of 2 to 6 years.

== Symbolism ==
In an interview with the online publication "NV", representatives of the movement talked about the meaning of the yellow ribbon:

«There is no deep symbolism in the name Yellow Ribbon. Yellow is a bright color on the flag of Ukraine. And the phrase itself is easy to remember».

== See also ==
- Ukrainian resistance during the 2022 Russian invasion of Ukraine
- 2022 protests in Russian-occupied Ukraine
- Popular Resistance of Ukraine
- Berdiansk Partisan Army
