= 256 Cyberassault division =

256 Cyberassault division (Ukrainian: 256 Кіберштурмова дивізія) – is a team of Ukrainian hacktivists which participates in Russian - Ukrainian cyber warfare on the Ukrainian side. The team conducts hacking of electronic mailboxes and web resources related to the military, propaganda and state administrative organizations of the Russian Federation.

Since the beginning of 2023, Cyber Resistance has been publishing on the Telegram social network a large number of materials obtained through hacking, as well as analytical notes based on the information obtained from these materials. In addition, the CyberResistance materials became a starting point for investigations performed by the InformNapalm community and journalists in several countries outside of Ukraine. In its activities, CyberResistance cooperates with the Center of National Resistance.

== Example operations ==
- After the hacking of the mail of one of the heads of the military commissariat in Tula, a network of recruiters of Cuban citizens as mercenaries for the Russian army in Ukraine was exposed; another example of the community's work was the exposure of the ways of supplying Russian military industries with sanctioned weapon components by Canadian companies.
- The exposure of supply routes used by Canadian companies to deliver sanctioned weapons components to Russia.
- In January 2025, the group provided InformNapalm with a dump of correspondence between Chechen officials concerning the Kadyrov administration's intention to award Milchakov the medal "For Merit to the Chechen Republic".
- In February 2026, division specialists, with support from the wider community, obtained thousands of data packets containing the coordinates of Russian military personnel attempting to activate Starlink terminals. Within one week, the organisers reported receiving:
  - 2.420 data packets concerning enemy terminals and their precise locations;
  - 31 applications from Ukrainian citizens willing to act as "drop" intermediaries;
  - $5.870 sent by Russian military personnel to "activate" communications.
- In late October 2026, division specialists, together with the InformNapalm community and Ukrainian Militant, published correspondence between two agents of the Foreign Intelligence Service of Russia, Irina Parman and Timur Syrtlanov. The two were planning to organise a rally in Budapest in support of Rosatom's Paks II nuclear power plant project. They sought to recruit members of the Russian diaspora in Hungary through social media to participate in the rally.
- In early November 2026, the 256th Cyber Assault Division provided materials for publication documenting efforts by Russian military intelligence to radicalise protests in France. The materials included correspondence between GRU officer Stanislav Nemich and an agent among the senior ranks of the protest movement. The correspondence contained instructions concerning planned demonstrations and how to conduct meetings with representatives of the French government.

== Sources ==
- Telegram
- Twitter/X
- Взлом российского военного преступника, командира в/ч 75387, 960-го штурмового авиационного полка
- Ukrainian hackers say they have compromised Russian spy who hacked Democrats in 2016
- Ukrainian hackers' hoax unmasks Russian pilots accused of Mariupol theatre bombing
