= Ukrainian partisans =

Ukrainian partisans may refer to:

- Ukrainian Insurgent Army during World War II
- Soviet partisans in Ukraine during World War II
- Ukrainian resistance during the Russian invasion of Ukraine
