= Tactical Group Kruk =

- Тактична група ССО «Крук»
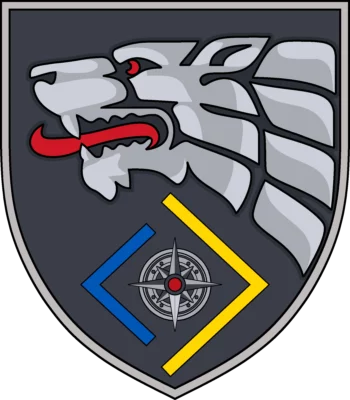
- Insignia of the Tactical Group
- Founded: 2022
- Country: Ukraine
- Branch: Ukrainian Special Operations Forces
- Type: Special forces
- Role: Special operations Direct action Special reconnaissance
- Part of: Rukh Oporu
- Engagements: Russo-Ukrainian war: 2022 Russian invasion of Ukraine; Ukrainian resistance during the Russian invasion of Ukraine

Commanders
- Current commander: Lt. Col. Maksym Tsyndrin

The Tactical Group "Kruk" (MUN A6175) is an elite spetsnaz unit, and one of the most covert and secretive units amongst the entirety of the Ukrainian SOF being subordinated to Rukh Oporu but serving under the SOF Operational command. No details about any of its operations have ever been made public.

== History ==
It was established at an undisclosed date in 2022, following the Russian invasion of Ukraine. It is one of the most covert and secretive units amongst the Ukrainian SOF and no details about any of its operations have been made public although it is known to be operating on the frontlines of the Russian invasion of Ukraine.

== Equipment ==
The unit is known to operate Mavic 3 UAVs donated by Volyn community as well as Mavic 3T, Mavic Pro and other UAVs donated by Netishyn community. It is also known to operate modified Peugeot Boxers.

== Commanders ==
- Lieutenant Colonel Maksym Tsyndrin
