= 2022 protests in Russian-occupied Ukraine =

Protests against Russian invasion

- Part of the protests against the Russian invasion of Ukraine
- Date: 24 February 2022 – April 2022
- Location: Towns and cities of Ukraine under Russian occupation
- Caused by: Russian invasion of Ukraine
- Goals: Withdrawal of Russian troops from Ukraine; End of Russian occupation of towns and cities
- Methods: Demonstrations; Civil resistance
- Status: Protests suppressed by Russian occupation authorities and military

Parties
Ukrainian resistance: Ukraine; Anti-occupation protesters; Yellow Ribbon; Popular Resistance of Ukraine	Occupying forces: Russia; Russian Armed Forces; National Guard; National Guard Forces Command; OMON; SOBR; Berkut; Donetsk People's Republic; Donetsk People's Republic People's Militia; Luhansk People's Republic; Luhansk People's Republic People's Militia

Casualties and losses
At least 1 dead, 13 injured	

Casualties
- Arrested: unknown

During the Russian invasion of Ukraine and the resulting Russian occupation of multiple Ukrainian towns and cities, numerous cases of non-violent resistance against the invasion took place. Local residents organized protests against the invasion and blocked the movement of Russian military equipment. The Russian military dispersed the protests, sometimes with live fire, injuring many and killing some. Most of the large protests ended in March.

Human Rights Watch reports that protesters had been tortured in the south of the occupation zone.

== Timeline ==
Anti-occupation protests in Berdiansk, 28 February

=== North ===
On 25 February, the city of Konotop was surrounded by Russian troops. On 2 March, at a gathering of city residents, the city's mayor, Artem Semenikhin (from the political party Svoboda), said that the Russian military was threatening to shell the city in case of disobedience and offered to resist. His proposal was followed by a standing ovation from the crowd.

There were protests in Slavutych on 26 March, as the battle of Slavutych escalated, with Russians attempting to occupy the city. According to reports, Russian troops had abducted the mayor of Slavutych, Yuri Fomichev; he was ultimately released in time to address a protest rally against the Russian invasion, which took place later that day in the city square. More than 5,000 city residents took part in the peaceful protest, until it was disrupted by Russian troops firing warning shots and launching stun grenades into the crowd. At least one civilian was injured.

=== East ===
On 1 March, in Kupiansk, Kharkiv oblast, the Russian army dispersed demonstrations.

On 3 March, civilians blocked the Russian military from entering Svatove in the Luhansk Oblast, while chanting Ukraine's national salute.

On 4 March, after the occupation of Novopskov in the Luhansk Oblast by Russian troops, local residents protested under Ukrainian flags. According to Ukrainska Pravda, citing locals, one person was injured as a result of shooting at protesters. On 5 March, the local residents protested again against the Russian occupation, and warning shots were again opened on them. According to the head of the Luhansk Regional State Administration, Serhiy Haidai, three locals were injured.

On 5 March, a significant number of civilians carrying Ukrainian flags and singing the Ukrainian anthem marched through the streets of Bilokurakyne in the Luhansk Oblast. The march was stopped by Russian forces.

In Starobilsk, Luhansk Oblast, civilians blocked roads for Russian military forces. On 6 March, a crowd tore down and burned the flag of the LPR, which was raised by Russian troops near the local government building, and replaced it with the Ukrainian flag while singing the national anthem.

On 6 March, there were protests in Troitske, Luhansk oblast.

On 8 March, locals from Svatove in the Luhansk Oblast gathered on the streets to protest against the occupation by Russian forces. Russian soldiers later threatened to disperse the rally by opening fire.

=== South: Zaporizhzhia ===
On 27 February, in Dniprorudne, the residents, along with the mayor, blocked roads to stop Russian troops.

On 28 February, in Berdiansk, when Russian troops had already entered the town, residents organised a protest, after which the Russians removed their technique from the city centre. Similar rallies are often repeated. On 20 March Russian troops opened warning shots, threatening the protesters, and repressed a demonstration.

During 1–2 March, thousands of residents of Enerhodar blocked the city entrance for Russian military convoys. On 20 March, a rally against the kidnapping of residents and officials by Russian troops took place in the city. On 2 April, Russian troops violently dispersed the rally with explosions.

On 1 March, in Melitopol, local residents organised a protest rally during which they marched along the avenue from Victory Square to the SBU building, occupied by the Russian military. According to the online local publication Our City, "unable to withstand the pressure [outside the building], Russian soldiers opened fire, first in the air, and then on the townspeople" and "one person received a gunshot wound in the knee". According to the BBC News Ukrainian Service, local residents organised a peaceful protest under Ukrainian flags and accused Russian soldiers of shelling and looting shops. As of 10 March, processions through the Melitopol city centre were repeated daily.

On 2 March, regular actions were held in Prymorsk.

On 2 March, near the village of Vodiane in the Zaporizhzhia Oblast, local residents blocked the road for Russian troops. Negotiations were held between the mayor of Vodiane and the mayor of the neighbouring village of Kamianka-Dniprovska with a representative of the Russian side, who said that if the military convoy passed peacefully through the settlement to its destination, no one would be hurt; residents did not accept this offer. According to the mayor of nearby Enerhodar, at around 15:30 local time, Russian troops opened fire on the protesters, injuring two of them.

On 7 March, there were protests in Tokmak.

=== South: Kherson ===
On 5 March, residents of Kherson went to a rally with Ukrainian flags and chanted that the city is still Ukrainian and will never be Russian, despite Russian occupation. The Russian military opened warning fire on the protesters. At the same time, the National Police of Ukraine published a video where a Kherson police officer, holding a Ukrainian flag in his hands, jumped on a Russian armoured personnel carrier that was driving past the rally, and local residents supported his action with shouts and applause.

On 6 March, there were protests in Chonhar under the flags of Crimean Tatars.

On 6 March, during a rally in Nova Kakhovka, the Russian military opened fire on protesters indiscriminately "despite the fact that people were unarmed and did not pose any threat," resulting in at least one death and seven injuries. On 7 March, the Kherson Regional Prosecutor's Office of Ukraine, according to Part 2 of Article 438 of the Criminal Code of Ukraine (violation of the laws and customs of war, associated with premeditated murder), opened a criminal case on the deaths of several protesters.

On 16 March, there was a rally in Skadovsk against the kidnapping of the mayor. In the city, civilians removed Russian flags from the government building.

On 20 March, protesters in Kherson confronted several Russian military vehicles and told them to "go home". On 27 April, the city council representatives were forced out, and a pro-Ukrainian protest was dispersed.

On 21 March, Russian forces used stun grenades and gunfire to disperse pro-Ukrainian protesters in Kherson; at least one person was wounded.

In March, there were demonstrations in Oleshky, Henichesk, Kakhovka, Hola Prystan, Zaliznyi Port, Novotroitske, Chaplynka, and other cities in the Kherson oblast.

=== Yellow Ribbon movement ===
The “Yellow Ribbon” movement, a non-violent resistance initiative, emerged in April in the occupied territories. The movement called for residents to hang yellow ribbons and Ukrainian flags as a symbol of defiance.

== See also ==
- Ukrainian resistance during the Russian invasion of Ukraine
- Anti-war protests in Russia (2022–present)
- Russian-occupied territories of Ukraine
- Russian-occupied territories
