= National Resistance Center of Ukraine =

- Центр національного спротиву
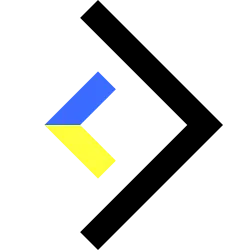
- Emblem of the National Resistance Center of Ukraine
- Country: Ukraine
- Branch: Ukrainian Special Operations Forces
- Type: Special forces
- Role: Special operations Direct action Special reconnaissance Intelligence gathering Psychological warfare
- Part of: Rukh Opuro
- Engagements: Russo-Ukrainian war: 2022 Russian invasion of Ukraine; Battle of Bucha; Ukrainian resistance during the Russian invasion of Ukraine
- Website: sprotyv.mod.gov.ua

Center of National Resistance of Ukraine (Ukrainian: Центр національного спротиву) was created in March 2022, with the beginning of the full-scale aggression of the Russian Federation against Ukraine, under the Special Operations Forces of the Armed Forces of Ukraine.

== History ==
The National Resistance Center was established within the framework "On the Foundations of National Resistance", adopted on 16 July 2021 and entered into effect on 1 January 2022.

The CNS became operational at the end of February 2022, following the Russian invasion of Ukraine, and started activities focused on the Russian occupied territory of Ukraine. It provided information and guidelines for "struggle against the occupiers", through both violent and non-violent resistance via internet and also providing partisans with information regarding tactical medicine, cyber security, tactics and reconnaissance. The center operates deep inside the occupied territories, reporting and maintaining contact with partisans as well as regular Ukrainian citizens. It also operates a YouTube channel dedicated to training of partisans as well as information warfare and has also been involved in the tracking down of warcriminals involved in the Bucha massacre, specifically those belonging to the 83rd Separate Guards Air Assault Brigade.

The aim of creating the Center is to teach the civilian population of Ukraine methods of non-violent resistance to the enemy. At the beginning of its activity, the Center focused its efforts mostly on the temporarily occupied territories of Ukraine.

== Structure ==
The National Resistance Center has 5 Battalion level units in its structure:

- Kharkiv Resistance Center
- Khmelnytskyi Resistance Center
- Kyiv Resistance Center
- Oleksandriia Resistance Center
- Zakarpattia Resistance Center
