= S.R.O.K =

Death to Russian Occupiers and Collaborators
- Смерть Русским Оккупантам и Коллаборантам
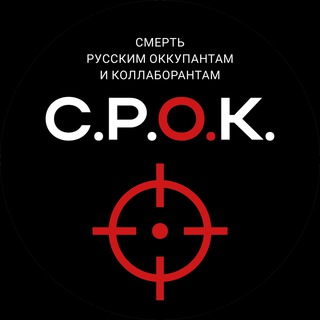
- SROK Logo
- Active: 2022–present
- Country: Ukraine
- Allegiance: Armed Forces of Ukraine
- Type: Partisan
- Role: Unconventional warfare
- Nicknames: C.P.O.K. S.R.O.K.
- Engagements: Ukrainian resistance in Russian-occupied Ukraine

Death to Russian Occupiers and Collaborators (SROK; Russian: Смерть Русским Оккупантам и Коллаборантам, romanized: Smertʹ Russkim Okkupantam i Kollaborantam) also called CPOK, is a Ukrainian partisan organization operating in the territories of Ukraine occupied by Russian troops during the Russian invasion of Ukraine.

The group mainly operates in the Azov area to the east of Mariupol, but has also been conducting operations in the Kherson region.

== Activity ==
On April 20, 2024, the group reported that the Russians began forcibly removing people from settlements on the left bank of the Dnieper in the Kherson region.

On October 13, 2024, the group stated that its representatives had identified the location of DPRK military personnel in the occupied part of the Donetsk region.

In one noted digital action, S.R.O.K. activists infiltrated an online meeting organised by the Russian youth programme Yunarmiya (Юнармия) for schoolchildren in occupied territory: during the Zoom session they interrupted the class to inform students that participation in Yunarmiya could lead to death in the trenches and that Russia uses them as tools in its war against Ukraine.

Since its emergence in 2022, S.R.O.K. has carried out a series of clandestine and sabotage operations in Russian‑occupied territories of Ukraine, especially in the Zaporizhzhia Oblast. According to a 20 August 2025 commentary, the group “operates in the Russia‑controlled territories of Zaporizhzhia region. They are systematically engaged in vehicle bombings and ambushes on the roads.”
