= Rukh Oporu =

- Рух Опору
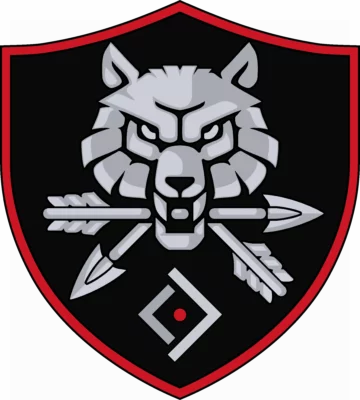
- Corps Insignia
- Active: 2014–present
- Country: Ukraine
- Allegiance: Armed Forces of Ukraine
- Branch: Ukrainian Ground Forces (2014–2016); Ukrainian Special Operations Forces (2016–)
- Type: Partisan
- Role: Unconventional warfare Asymmetric warfare
- Size: Corps
- Part of: Ukrainian Special Operations Forces
- Nickname(s): Resistance Movement
- Engagements: Russo-Ukrainian War: War in Donbass; Russian Invasion of Ukraine; Ukrainian resistance in Russian-occupied Ukraine

Commanders
- Current commander: Colonel Vitaly Verbytsky

Insignia
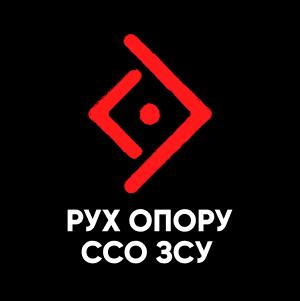
- Identification symbol

The Rukh Oporu (Ukrainian: Рух Опору, MUN A0987), translated as lit. Resistance Movement, is a corps-level unit of the Special Operations Forces of Ukraine tasked specifically with organizing, establishing, funding, training and coordinating as well as directly partaking in the Ukrainian resistance in Russian-occupied Ukraine employing sabotage, psychological as well as direct and indirect forms of warfare to disrupt the activities of the occupying forces and to demoralize their troops. It was covertly established in 2014 but was formally established in 2021.

== History ==
It was covertly established following the Russian occupation of Crimea in 2014, and was officially established under the law "On the foundations of national resistance" in 2021 composed of partisan, underground and auxiliary forces.

Following the Russian invasion of Ukraine, it heavily coordinated the Ukrainian resistance in Russian-occupied Ukraine. On 4 June 2022, the Corps destroyed a Russian communication center in the occupied Kharkiv Oblast. On 27 July 2022, it destroyed a group of Russian soldiers in Kherson Oblast and seized their documents. Yellow Ribbon movement was also organized by it. On 13 October 2023, the Corps conducted a sabotage operation in Melitopol targeting a train carrying fuel and ammunition, 150m railway and a locomotive were damaged. It also sabotaged ground communication lines in Luhansk Oblast. In August 2024, the corps released a video showcasing its operations in Yevpatoria in Crimea. Its operations were spread throughout the entirety of occupied territory. In September 2024, it published a video of a Molotov cocktail attack near a railroad in Crimea. Also, in September 2024, it conducted a demoralizing campaign using leaflets. In 2024, the number of the corps personnel was claimed to be in several thousands although the exact number was kept classified.

== Operational secrecy ==
The number of personnel of the corps and the details of many of its operations are "state secrets" and are not disclosed including the name of its commander who's an undisclosed officer with the rank of a colonel. Even the families of the operatives are not provided information about the operations. It coordinated attack on the Lipetsk airfield damaging Su-34, Su-35 and MiG-31 aircraft and an ordinance factory in Nizhny Novgorod region that produced explosives for bombs and artillery ammunition as well as UAV strikes in Lipetsk, Tula, Ryazan, Oryol, Ivanovo, Kursk, Nizhny Novgorod and Moscow regions.

== Tasks ==
The tasks of the detachment include:

- Establishment, training, funding and providing equipment to resistance and partisan movements
- Hindering the operations of Russian forces via sabotage operations
- Special Operations
- Preparation of Ukrainian citizens for resistance movements
- Cyber operations
- Nonviolent resistance
- Covert operations within the recognized territory of Russia

== Commanders ==
- Colonel Vitaly Verbytsky (Note: Reportedly, officially undisclosed)

== Structure ==
- National Resistance Center
  - Kharkiv Resistance Center
  - Khmelnytskyi Resistance Center
  - Kyiv Resistance Center
  - Oleksandriia Resistance Center
  - Zakarpattia Resistance Center
- Rukh Oporu North
- Rukh Oporu East
- Tactical Group Kruk
