= Berdiansk Partisan Army =

Ukrainian underground partisan group

- Бердянська партизанська армія
- Logo of BPA
- Founded: 30 April 2022
- Dates active: 2022–present
- Country: Ukraine
- Headquarters: Berdiansk, Zaporizhzhia Oblast
- Ideology: Ukrainian nationalism Anti-imperialism; Anti-Putinism
- Political position: Big tent
- Website: Berdiansk Partisan Army on Telegram

The Berdiansk Partisan Army (BPA; Ukrainian: Бердянська партизанська армія, romanized: Berdianska partyzanska armiya) is a Ukrainian underground partisan group operating in Berdiansk, Zaporizhzhia Oblast, Ukraine. It has been involved in attacks against the Russian occupation of Zaporizhzhia Oblast.

== History ==
On 27 February 2022, it became known that Russian army had entered Berdiansk. The next day, Russian soldiers occupied all the administrative buildings of the city.

On 30 April, a video was posted on the Berdiansk Partisan Army Telegram channel demanding that the soldiers of the Russian Armed Forces leave the city. The text of the demand was read out by three men with hidden faces with automatic weapons in their hands. The appeal was also made public by People's Deputy from the Servant of the People Yuriy Misyahin.

On 2 June, in the port of Berdiansk, partisans tried to destroy the military cargo of the Russian army.

On 6 August, the BPA staged an explosion near the captured police department, which the occupation authorities tried to pass off as the detonation of a gas cylinder from a cigarette butt.

On 8 August, the partisans revealed that they had staged an assassination attempt on one of the deputy heads of the occupation administration.

On 10 August, the BPA "declared a hunt" for the organizers of the referendum on the accession of the Zaporizhzhia Oblast to Russia.

On 26 August, the BPA blew up the car of collaborator Alexei Kolesnikov, killing him. On 6 September, a car with the commandant of the city Artem Bardin was blown up, seriously injuring Bardin.

In September, the BPA issued instructions on how to behave at the referendum on the accession of the Zaporizhzhia Oblast to Russia.

== See also ==
- 2022 Belarusian and Russian partisan movement
- Popular Resistance of Ukraine
- Atesh (movement)
