= Budonnivskyi District, Donetsk =

Coordinates: 47°58′00″N 37°51′50″E

Budonnivskyi District Будьоннівський район
- Urban district
- Interactive map of Budonnivskyi District
- Country: Ukraine
- Oblast: Donetsk City Municipality

Area
  - Total: 76.64 km^{2} (29.59 sq mi)

Population
  - Total: 94,875
- Time zone: UTC+2 (EET)
  - Summer (DST): UTC+3 (EEST)

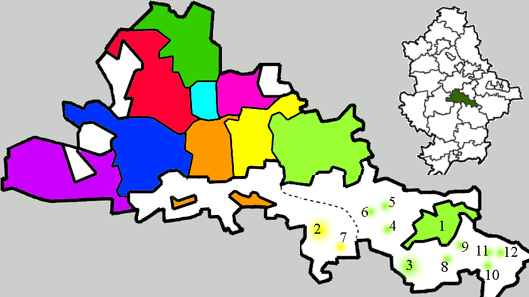
Raions of Donetsk on the territory of the Donetsk City Municipality: Budonivskyi District Voroshylovskyi District Kalininskyi District Kyivskyi District Kirovskyi District / Kuibyshevskyi District Leninskyi District Petrovskyi District Proletarskyi District

Budonnivskyi District (Ukrainian: Будьоннівський район; Russian: Будённовский район) is an urban district of the city of Donetsk, Ukraine, named after Marshal of the Soviet Union Semyon Mikhailovich Budyonny.

It was created in 1980 out of the Proletarskyi, Kirovskyi and Leninskyi districts. The district's name was a revival of the original name of Proletarskyi District.

On 22 February 2026, the Donetsk Oblast Military Administration renamed it to Bohodukhivskyi District (Ukrainian: Богодухівський район) as part of the decommunization and derussification campaign. This name comes from Bohodukhivska Gully and Bohodukhova River. However, this name is only de jure used by the Ukrainian government and the renaming has not de facto taken place while Donetsk is under Russian control.

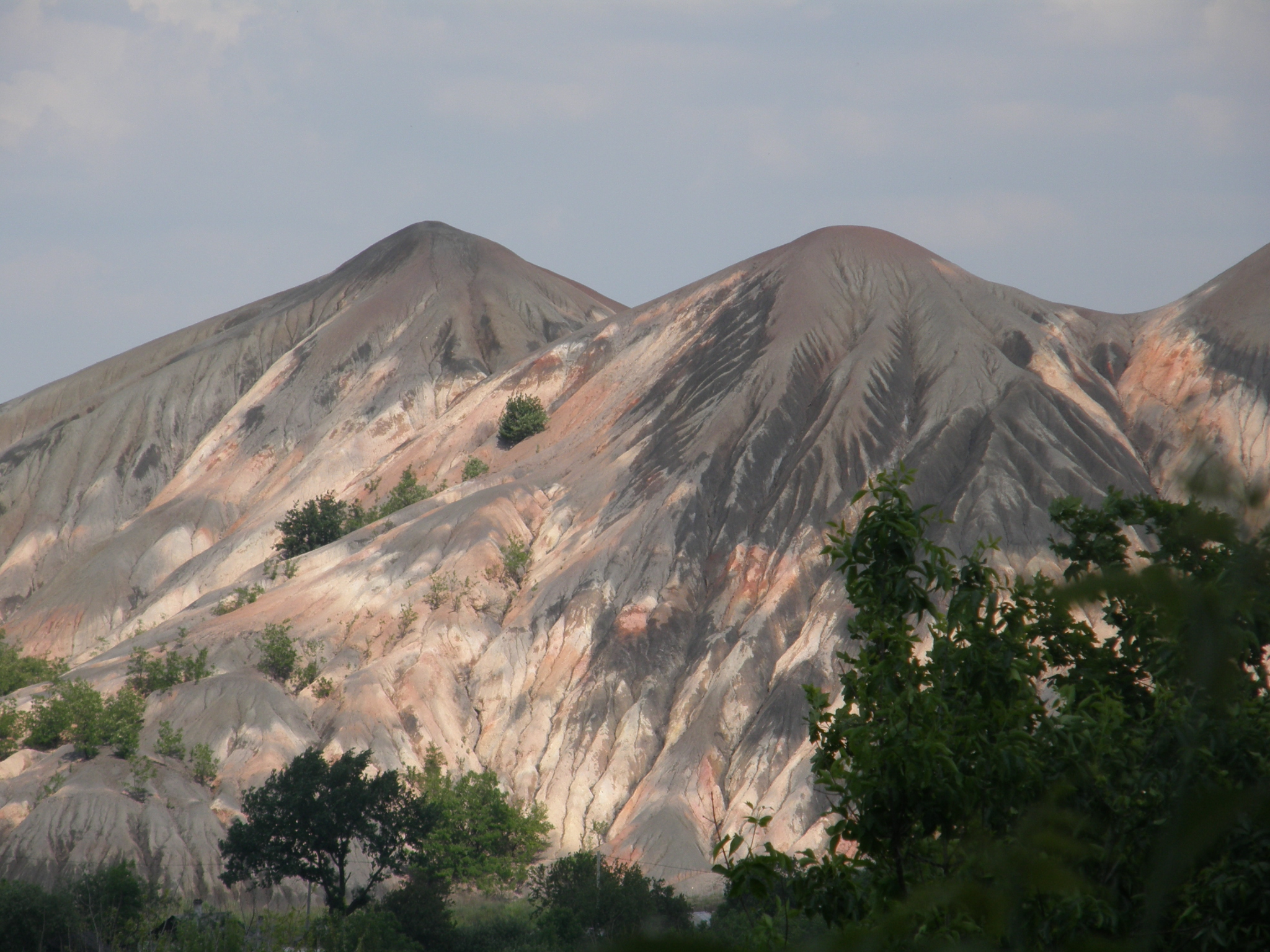
Slag heaps, locally known as terrikon
