= Ukrainian resistance in Russian-occupied Ukraine =

- Part of the Russo-Ukrainian war (2022–present)
Date	1 March 2022 – present (4 years, 8 months and 3 weeks)
Location	Russian-occupied territories of Ukraine
Status	Ongoing

Belligerents
Ukraine; Ukrainian resistance movement	Russia

Commanders and leaders
(Ukraine) Volodymyr Zelenskyy; (Ukraine) Oleksii Reznikov; (Ukraine) Rustem Umerov; (Ukraine) Valerii Zaluzhnyi; (Ukraine) Oleksandr Syrskyi; (Crimean Tatars) Mustafa Dzhemilev; (Autonomous Republic of Crimea) Tamila Tasheva; (Donetsk Oblast) Vadym Filashkin; (Luhansk Oblast) Oleksii Kharchenko; (Kherson Oblast) Oleksandr Prokudin; (Zaporizhzhia Oblast) Ivan Fedorov; (Kharkiv Oblast) Oleh Syniehubov; (Mykolaiv Oblast) Vitaliy Kim	(Russia) Vladimir Putin; (Russia) Sergei Shoigu; (Russia) Andrey Belousov; (Russia) Valery Gerasimov; (Republic of Crimea (Russia)) Sergey Aksyonov; (Sevastopol) Mikhail Razvozhayev; (Donetsk People's Republic) Denis Pushilin; (Luhansk People's Republic) Leonid Pasechnik; Volodymyr Saldo; Yevhen Balytskyi; Vitaly Ganchev

Units involved
Popular Resistance of Ukraine; Berdiansk Partisan Army; Yellow Ribbon; Atesh; SBU; Main Directorate of Intelligence; Rukh Oporu; S.R.O.K; «Ї» group; Zla Mavka; (Ukraine) Crimea Combat Seagulls	Russian Armed Forces; National Guard; Berkut; OMON; SOBR; FSB; FSB Border Service; Police of Russia; Ukrainian collaborators; Donetsk People's Militia; Luhansk People's Militia; Defected policemen

When Russia invaded Ukraine in early 2022, it occupied vast portions of the country, having already occupied parts of the Donetsk and Luhansk oblasts as well as the entirety of Crimea since the beginning of the Russo-Ukrainian war in 2014. Partisan groups began to be organized in mid-2022. These groups have been involved in intelligence-gathering, sabotage, and assassinations. Much of their activity has taken place in the Kherson and Zaporizhzhia oblasts of southern Ukraine.

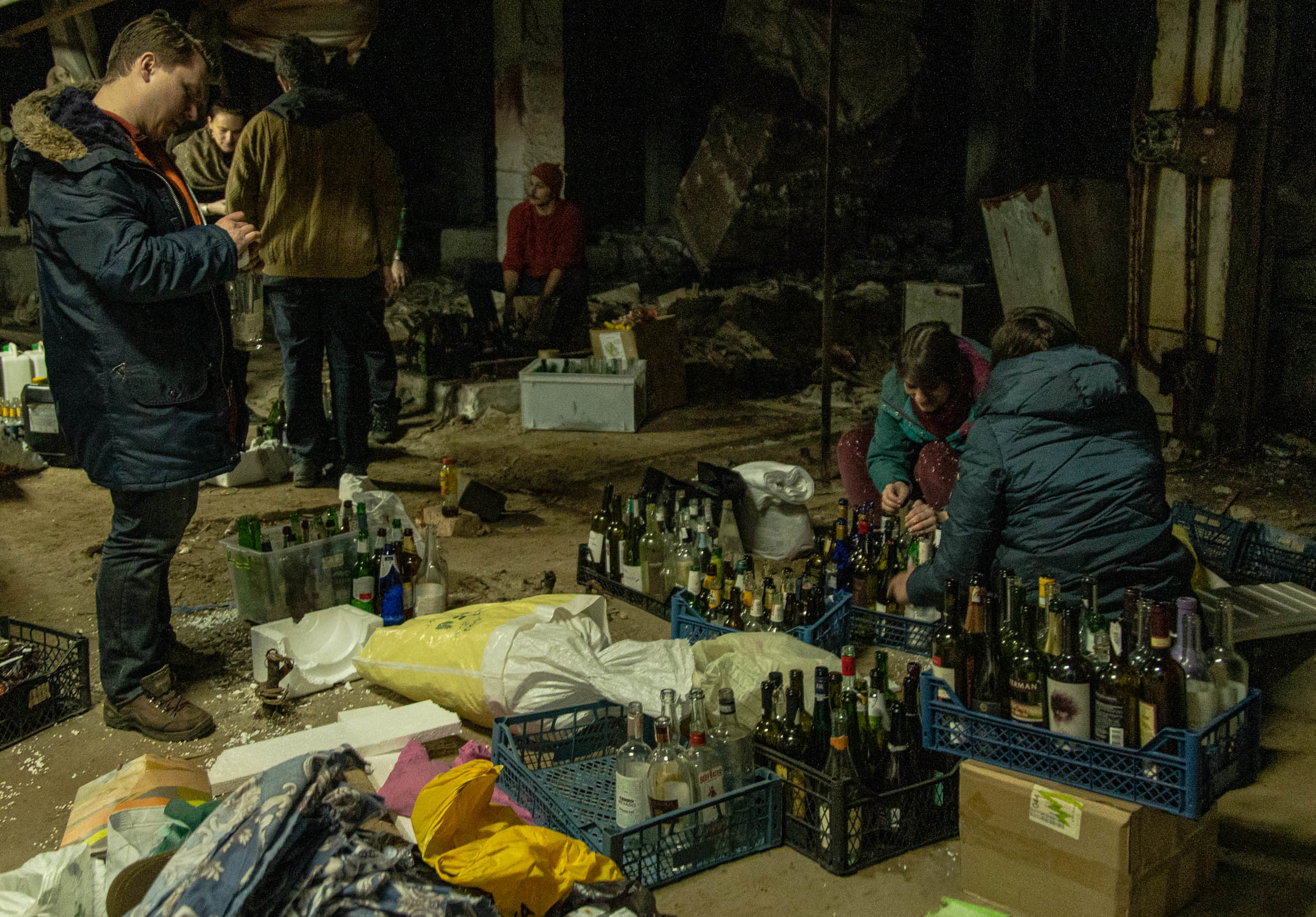
Civilians in Kyiv preparing Molotov cocktails, 26 February 2022

== 2022 ==
=== March ===
On 1 March, the mayor of Kreminna, Volodymyr Struk was abducted from his home. His wife claimed that unknown camouflaged men entered their property and kidnapped her husband. On 2 March, Struk was found shot dead with a gunshot wound in his chest. Anton Gerashchenko, an advisor to the Ministry of Internal Affairs of Ukraine claimed that Struk was killed by "unknown patriots", suggesting that locals were responsible for his abduction and assassination. Struk was known to be an important pro-Russia figure in the Luhansk Oblast with "money and support from the Russian Federation", who had already expressed support for Russian proxy-forces back in 2014. Before his death, Struk called on local authorities to communicate and collaborate with approaching Russian forces.

On 20 March, two unknown assailants shot and killed the assistant to Vladimir Saldo, Pavel Slobodchikov, in his car outside Saldo's house in Kherson.

=== April ===
On 3 April, the Ukrainian government stated that two Russian soldiers were killed and 28 others hospitalized after Ukrainian civilians handed out poisoned cakes to Russian soldiers of the Russian 3rd Motor Rifle Division in Izium, Kharkiv Oblast.

On 20 April, pro-Russian blogger Valery Kuleshov was shot and killed while in his car in Kherson.

On 21 April, on a television interview, the elected mayor of Russian-occupied Melitopol, Ivan Fedorov, said that, according to Ukrainian intelligence, Ukrainian partisans had killed 100 Russian soldiers in the city, primarily Russian police patrols and mostly through ambushes at night. Fedorov also claimed that the Russian army was struggling to deal with these partisans, as the majority of the population of Melitopol was against the Russian presence.

On 21 April, Ukrayinski Novini reported that partisans in occupied Kherson had left a banner with a message on a pole in the city, which said: "Russian occupier and everyone who supports their regime. We are close—we are already working in Kherson. Death awaits you all! Kherson is Ukraine!".

On 25 April, Pavel Sharogradsky, a pro-Russian resident of Novoaidar in the Luhansk Oblast was kidnapped by unknown suspects, after becoming a high-profile collaborator in the town. Sharogradsky met with representatives of the Russian Armed Forces and reportedly gave away names and addresses of local political activists, veterans of the Ukrainian army, suspected partisans and their families. A couple of days later, his dead body was found with severe injuries and a gunshot wound to his head.

On 26 April, the Governor of Mykolaiv Oblast, Vitalii Kim, said that there had been resistance against the Russian army in the Kherson Oblast for two months and that Ukrainian partisans had killed 80 Russian troops in the region.

On 28 April, 24 Kanal reported that partisans in occupied Nova Kakhovka had left a banner with a message on a pole in the city. It said as follows: "Russian occupier! Know! Kakhovka is Ukraine! We are close! Our people are already working here! Death awaits you! Kakhovka is Ukraine!".

On 28 April, Apostrophe reported that guerrillas blew up the railway bridge in Yakymivka, Zaporizhzhia Oblast.

On 30 April, members of the Berdiansk Partisan Army (BPA) posted a video on Telegram calling for Russian troops to leave Berdiansk. They announced that they were organizing their forces and that they were "ready to come out of the shadows". The account of this organization was used during the invasion for gathering and showing evidence of Russian crimes in the city and information about collaborators with the Russian army in Berdiansk.

=== May ===
On 13 May, Oleksii Reznikov, the Minister of Defence of Ukraine, spoke of the defeats and difficulties that Russian troops had been experiencing in Ukraine ever since the start of the invasion. Reznikov also spoke of the partisans in Kherson, Melitopol and other localities, calling them "an important contribution to common victory".

On 22 May, in occupied Enerhodar, Ukrainian partisans detonated an explosive in front of a residential building where the Russian-installed mayor of the city Andrei Shevchik was located. Shevchik and his bodyguards sustained injuries of varying severity, and Shevchik ended up in intensive care. He was first taken to a hospital in Enerhodar and then to another in Melitopol.

On 28 May, an unknown person attempted to set fire to a Russian military enlistment office in Simferopol, Russian-occupied Crimea. The suspect reportedly used a molotov cocktail in the unsuccessful attack, which only caused minor damage.

In late May, six Russian border guards at the Zernovo border checkpoint in northern Ukraine were reportedly killed on the week of 30 May – 5 June when they were attacked by Ukrainian partisans. Two days later, a bomb exploded near the office of Russian-installed Zaporizhzhia Oblast governor Yevhen Balytskyi, a pro-Russian official and de facto mayor of Melitopol.

=== June ===
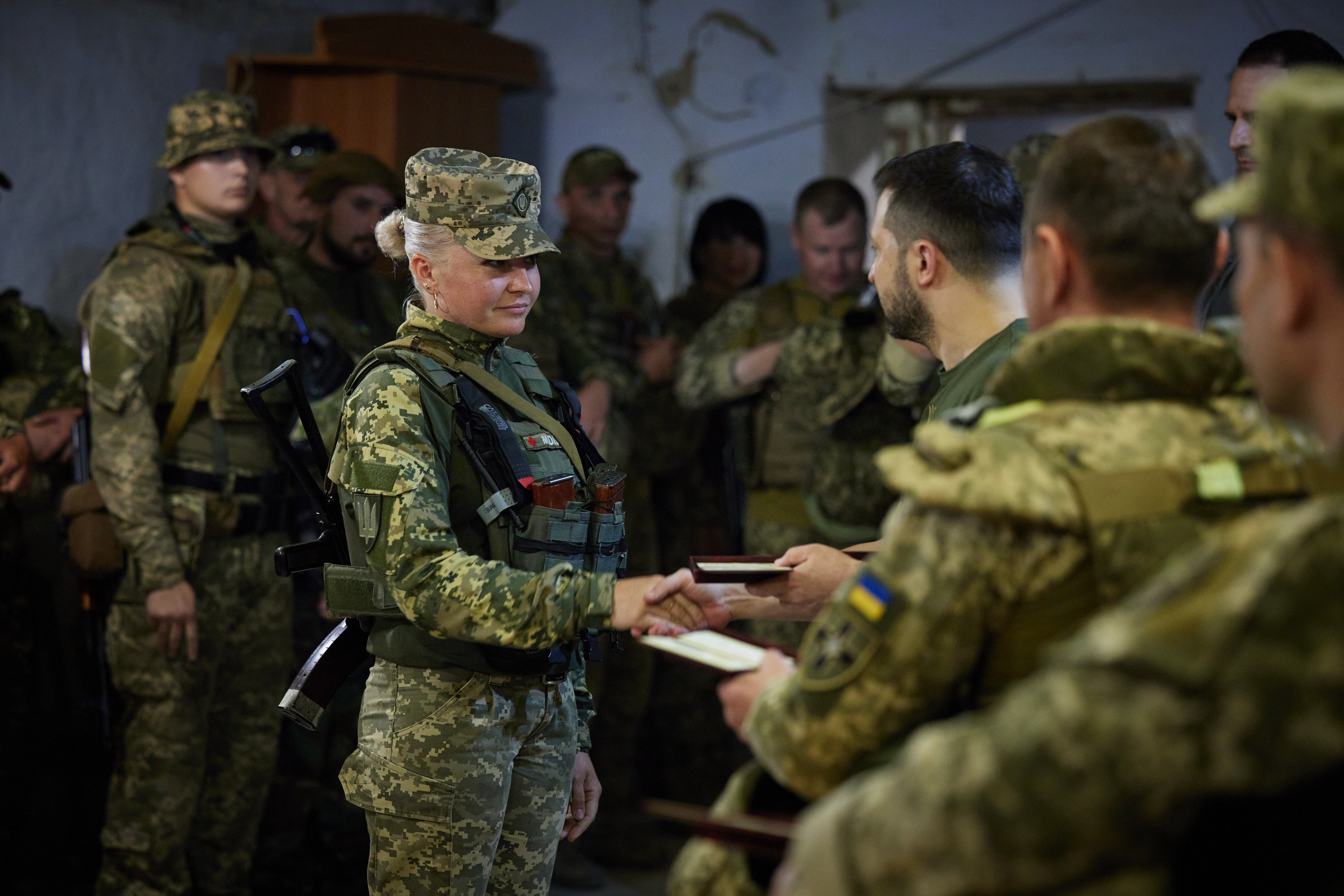
President Zelenskyy awarding a female soldier in June 2022

On 18 June, an explosive device went off in the car of Yevgeny Sobolev, the head of the Kherson Region penal service. He survived the blast and was taken to a hospital according to TASS.

On 20 June, three Russian soldiers were at a waterfront cafe in Kherson when a shooter opened fire at them. Two of the soldiers were killed, while the surviving soldier was hospitalized, according to Ukrainian Southern Command.

On 24 June, in occupied Kherson, a Russian appointed official, Dmitry Savluchenko, was killed by a car bomb, reportedly placed by Ukrainian partisans.

=== July ===
On 7 July police officer Serhii Tomko who had defected to the Russian side was shot and killed in his vehicle in Nova Kakhovka.

On 11 July, Yevgeny Yunakov, the Russian-appointed administrator of Velykyi Burluk was killed by a car bomb according to TASS.

On 24 July, partisans in Melitopol attacked rail infrastructure during the night, causing moderate damage to a section of railway. Explosions were reportedly heard near the Melitopol Airfield and near the village of Kostyantynivka, according to the mayor of Melitopol Ivan Fedorov.

On 26 July, Euromaidan Press reported that the Satelit factory in Mariupol had been attacked by partisans and "has been burning for 10 days".

On 27 July, in occupied Kherson an improvised explosive blew up a car with two defecting police officers inside of it, both were severely injured and one later died from his wounds.

On 28 July, The Daily Telegraph reported that posters with the message "Can't leave? HIMARS will help you" had begun appearing in Kherson.

On 29 July, partisans in Luhansk Oblast burned a distribution box controlling the railway traffic lights, junctions and crossings near Svatove during the night, according to the head of the Luhansk Regional Military-Civil Administration, Serhiy Haidai. Also on 29 July, Petro Andriushchenko, the Advisor to the Mayor of Mariupol, reported that partisans had set grain fields near the city on fire so that Russian forces would not be able to steal and export the grain.

=== August ===
On 4 August, a local partisan group ambushed a car, which was carrying the Russian-installed mayor and his deputy in Bilovodsk, a town in the northern part of the Luhansk Oblast. Both passengers sustained injuries from the small arms fire that targeted their car and had to undergo medical treatment.

On 6 August, Ukrainian media reported that the deputy head of the Russian administration in Nova Kakhovka, Vitaly Guru, was shot dead in his home; this was, however, refuted.

On 11 August, Askyar Laishev, a former traffic police officer and the Russian-appointed Head of Intelligence of the Luhansk Oblast, was killed when resistance fighters blew up his car in Starobilsk. He was reportedly able to eject from his burning car, but later succumbed to his injuries. Laishev's ties to Russian proxies were exposed back in 2014, when Oleh Liashko's volunteer unit Ukrayina found out that Laishev was covering for a local separatist named Vikor Rybalko, who was involved in organizing a referendum on the independence of the region. The incident was caught on camera by former Vice News reporter Simon Ostrovsky, who joined Liashko and his men on a nightly raid.

On 13 August, pictures of leaflets, which were taken in Lysychansk, started to appear online. The posters contained messages, in which the partisans threatened the lives of local collaborators and Russian-installed officials. This is part of a presumed larger intimidation operation in the western Luhansk Oblast, as similar posters started to appear in Sievierodonetsk a month earlier.

On 15 August, mayor of Melitopol reported that guerrillas blew up the railway bridge which was used by Russians near the city.

On 20 August, pro-Ukrainian partisans conducted an unsuccessful attack against Konstantin Ivashchenko, the Russian-installed mayor of Mariupol, using an improvised explosive device.

On 23 August, Ihor Telehin, the deputy head of the internal policy department in Kherson Oblast was injured in a targeted explosion.

On 24 August, the head of the Russian-appointed administration of Mykhailivka in Zaporizhzhia Oblast Ivan Sushko was wounded in a car bombing, he was taken to a hospital and died there from his wounds.

On 26 August, Russian-appointed official Oleksandr Koliesnikov, the deputy chief of the Berdiansk traffic police was injured in an explosion. He was taken to hospital with shrapnel wounds, where he died hours later.

On 28 August, People's Deputy of Ukraine Oleksii Kovalov, who according to Ukrainian authorities at the beginning of July had assumed the position of deputy head of the Russian-appointed government of Kherson Oblast, was shot dead in his own home. According to further reports, his girlfriend also died in hospital after she was stabbed.

On 30 August, partisans reportedly launched attacks on pro-Russian security forces in Kherson city.

=== September ===
On 3 September, Maksym Mahrynov, a local from Tokmak in Zaporizhzhia Oblast blew himself up in front of his home when the Russian military tried to arrest him for guiding Ukrainian artillery fire. The blast killed Mahrynov on the spot and caused two more casualties among the Russian servicemen.

On 6 September, Russian-installed official Artem Bardin was heavily wounded when his car was blown up in Berdiansk. Russian officials reported that he had lost both of his legs and doctors were "fighting for his life" in the hospital where he was kept. Bardin later died in the hospital.

On 7 September, the headquarters of a pro-Russian organization called "We Are Together With Russia" was bombed in Melitopol.

On 10 September, Luhansk Oblast Governor Serhiy Haidai claimed that Ukrainian partisans had managed to capture parts of Kreminna during the 2022 Ukrainian Kharkiv Oblast counteroffensive.

On 16 September, the Deputy Head of Berdiansk CAA for Housing and Communal Services Oleg Boyko and his wife, Lyudmila Boyko—who was head of the city's election commission for the referendum to join Russia—were killed near their garage in Berdiansk in an apparent assassination.

On 16 September, Serhiy Horenko, the Prosecutor General of the Luhansk People's Republic and his deputy Kateryna Stehlenko were killed in a bomb attack that targeted their office in Luhansk, Luhansk Oblast.

On 17 September, unknown suspects targeted a car belonging to Russian propagandist Dmitry Kiselyov in an arson attack. The incident happened at Kiselyov's mansion in Koktebel, occupied Crimea.

=== October–November ===
On 31 October, Pavlo Ischuk, the Russian-installed First Deputy Mayor of Berdiansk for Foreign Policy and Mass Communications, was seriously injured by a bombing near his house in Berdiansk.

On 4 November, Head of the Donetsk People's Republic Denis Pushilin said that Alexander Nikulin, a judge of the Supreme Court of the DPR, was shot and seriously injured in Vuhlehirsk.

On 15 November, Melitopol Mayor Ivan Fedorov stated that Dmitry Trukhin, a former member of the city council and director of 'communal property' suffered serious injuries after a bombing attack on his residence in Melitopol.

=== December ===
On 6 December, Ukrainian militants unsuccessfully attempted to assassinate Mykola Volyk, who served as a Russian-installed deputy in occupied Melitopol, Zaporizhzhia Oblast.

On 11 December, guerillas set fire to barracks, which were occupied by Russian soldiers in the Crimean village of Sovietske.

On 12 December, Vitaly Bulyuk, First Deputy Head of the Kherson MCA for Economics, Financial and Budgetary Policy, Agriculture, Revenue and Fees, was injured in a car bombing in Skadovsk. His driver was killed.

On 22 December, it was reported that Andrei Shtepa, head of the Russian occupation in the Kakhovka Raion of Kherson Oblast, was assassinated in a car bombing near a Soviet monument in Kakhovka. His driver was also killed.

== 2023 ==
=== January ===
On 6 January, partisans blew up a railway line near Shchastia, Luhansk Oblast, which was mainly used to transport military equipment and stolen Ukrainian grain.

On 8 January, the ISW reported that Ukrainian militants blew up a gas pipeline in Lutuhyne, Luhansk Oblast. The explosion left 13,000 subscribers without any gas supply.

On 13 January, a car bombing attempting to kill the collaborator in charge of the Russian occupation of Berdiansk, Alexei Kichigin, took place, though he survived. On 16 January following a series of explosions, Ukrainian authorities announced that Kichigin had been killed in the strikes.

On 24 January, local Russian collaborator Valentyna Mamai was targeted in a car bombing in the center of Berdiansk, and later hospitalized.

=== February ===
On 3 February, local Russian collaborator police officer in Enerhodar, and local head of Russian troops, Yevgeny Kuzmin was killed with an improvised explosive device (IED) while he was in his car.

On 4 February, unknown suspects fatally shot Igor Mangushev in Kadiivka, Luhansk Oblast. Mangushev served as an officer in the Russian military and gained international attention when he called for "the death of as many Ukrainian soldiers as possible" while brandishing a skull, which according to him, belonged to a fallen Ukrainian soldier.

On 8 February, Ukrainian partisans committed an arson attack against a railway control station on the outskirts of Yasenivskyi in the occupied portion of the Luhansk Oblast.

=== March ===
On 14 March, local Russian collaborator Ivan Tkach was killed in a car bombing in the center of Melitopol.

On 19 March, Russian collaborator Serhii Moskalenko was killed in a car bombing in Skadovsk by Atesh partisans. Moskalenko had set up torture chambers in Kherson Oblast during the Russian occupation and had been appointed a "prison warden" by Russian authorities.

On 19 March, there was an attempt to blow up a gas pipeline in the city of Simferopol, Crimea. The facility suffered minor damage.

On 27 March, the car of Mikhail Moskvin, the Russian-appointed chief of police, was blown up in Mariupol, Donetsk Oblast. Moskvin survived.

=== April–May ===
On 23 April, Ukrainian militants of the Atesh movement ambushed a patrol of Russian soldiers by using an improvised explosive device near Oleshky, Kherson Oblast.

On 27 April, Russian collaborator Oleksandr Mishchenko was killed in a bombing in Melitopol. Mishchenko was previously the Chief of Police of Pryazovske Raion and had served as Deputy Chief of the Ministry of Internal Affairs of Melitopol for personnel since the Russian invasion.

On 2 May, a car bombing targeted another collaborating police officer in occupied Melitopol, Zaporizhzhia Oblast. The unnamed victim suffered injuries and was hospitalized.

On 15 May, Igor Kornet, the Minister of the Interior of the Luhansk People's Republic, was seriously wounded by an explosion in the city center of Luhansk. It was reported that Kornet was inside of a barber shop at the time of the blast, which injured four more people.

On 18 May, partisans blew up a railway line near Bakhchysarai, Crimea, causing the derailment of at least five freight wagons.

=== June ===
On 2 June, a car with four local collaborators was blown up in Russian-occupied Mykhailivka, Zaporizhzhia Oblast. Ivan Fedorov, the elected mayor of Melitopol, reported that one of the victims was Serhii Dydovodiuk, a local liquor distributor, who was known for having pro-Russian stances and serving fellow pro-Russian and Russian individuals at his café.

On 11 June, a partisan cell blew up a railway line in occupied Yakymivka, Zaporizhzhia Oblast.

On 14 June, Ukrainian guerillas blew up a key railway line near Melitopol, Zaporizhzhia Oblast. Ukrainian officials claimed that in addition to 50 meters of railway track, five freight carts got destroyed by the detonation.

On 19 June, the car of Vladimir Epifanov, the assistant of the Deputy Prime Minister of the Russian-occupied part of the Zaporizhzhia Oblast, was blown up in Simferopol, Crimea. According to initial reports, Epifanov and his bodyguards survived the blast, but sustained severe injuries.

On 21 June, Atesh partisans blew up a railway line between Feodosia and Vladyslavivka in Crimea, causing the disruption of railway traffic for multiple hours.

On 24 June, two 16-year-old partisans were fatally shot by a Russian sniper in Berdiansk after killing a Russian soldier and a collaborating police officer. (Note: In May 2024 in Poltava the local Lassalle street was divided into two parts and of these two "new streets" both of these shot teenagers Tigran Hovhannisyan and Nikita Khanganov had a street renamed after them.)

=== July ===
On 3 July, the FSB detained a man in the Crimean capital of Simferopol, who was preparing an assassination attempt on Sergey Aksyonov, the Russian-installed Head of Crimea.

On 19 July, Kyrylo Budanov, the Ukrainian head of the Main Intelligence Directorate of the Ministry of Defense, reported that Ukrainian partisans played a key role in the attack on a Russian ammunition depot near the Crimean town of Staryi Krym, which caused chain of strong explosions and the subsequent evacuation of nearby towns and villages.

On 29 July, two Russian officers were killed and 15 others hospitalized as the result of a mass poisoning carried out by Ukrainian partisans in the Russian-occupied port city of Mariupol in the Donetsk Oblast. Petro Andriushchenko, the advisor to the elected mayor of the city, claimed that Russian authorities assume that cyanide and pesticides were added to food, which was handed out at an event location to celebrate the Day of the Russian Navy.

In July, an unnamed Russian officer claimed in an interview that eight Russian soldiers had been murdered in Mariupol over the preceding two weeks. Six of them had been stabbed, and two had been shot in the back of the head, and that Russian authorities "concealed the incidents to avoid panic among Russian military units".

=== August ===
On 13 August, Ukrainian guerillas set fire to a Russian military base near the destroyed Azovstal plant in Mariupol, Donetsk Oblast. Local Ukrainian authorities reported losses among Russian troops and equipment, but didn't publish any further details. It was later reported that at least 10 Russian servicemen sustained injuries from the fire.

On 30 August, Atesh partisans blew up the election hub of the United Russia party in Nova Kakhovka, Kherson Oblast. The guerillas claimed the blast killed three Russian soldiers and burned "all the documentation that the occupiers brought for the elections scheduled for 8 to 10 September".

On 31 August, the local partisan group ′Y′ claimed responsibility for another arson attack on a Russian base on the outskirts of Mariupol and reportedly damaged at least four Russian military vehicles.

=== September–October ===
On 7 September, a car carrying two FSB officers was blown up in Oleshky in Russian-occupied Kherson Oblast. The car bomb killed one FSB officer instantly and injured the other one severely, as well as three Russian soldiers escorting the car.

On 15 September, Ukrainian partisans blew up two Russian army trucks by detonating an explosive charge, which according to them, was weighing 10 kg (22 lbs). The attack happened in Russian-occupied Henichesk, Kherson Oblast.

On 1 October, Atesh partisans released a video of freshly dug trenches and new dragon teeth fortifications near Feodosia in Crimea. They also stated that they are forming groups, which travel around the peninsula and report every building effort of military fortifications to the Ukrainian intelligence, to make sure "a breakthrough of the Armed Forces of Ukraine is successful".

On 7 October, a car bomb killed Vladimir Malov, a Russian-installed official in the city of Nova Kakhovka.

On 16 October, the Kyiv Post reported that Ukrainian partisans had recently poisoned Russian soldiers in occupied Mariupol, killing 26 and hospitalizing 15. Five other Russian soldiers were claimed to have drowned in Mariupol after being poisoned "summer of 2023".

On 23 October, Russian media sources reported the death of one Russian serviceman as the result of a detonation of an improvised explosive device in the occupied port city of Berdiansk. Later that day, a spokesperson of the Main Intelligence Directorate of Ukraine stated "a local resistance group" was behind the plot that targeted a car carrying four representatives of the Russian FSB and called the attack "an act of revenge".

On 27 October, former lawmaker and separatist official Oleg Tsaryov was shot on the premises of his home in Yalta, Autonomous Republic of Crimea. His condition was reported to be "critical" when he was rushed into hospital, but according to Russian official sources, he survived the attempt on his life. On 31 October, the FSB arrested a 46-year-old local resident, who reportedly confessed to the charges of attempting to kill Tsaryov.

=== November ===
On 8 November, Mykhailo Filiponenko, a Russian-installed official and former separatist leader was assassinated in Luhansk. Ukraine's military intelligence directorate claims it carried out "a special operation" in collaboration with local resistance fighters to liquidate Filiponenko. He reportedly survived a previous assassination attempt in February 2022, only three days before the start of Russia's full-scale invasion of Ukraine. Before 2010, Filiponenko was a local lawmaker for the pro-Russian Party of Regions.

On 10 November, Ukrainian partisans blew up a Russian police car in Mariupol, Eastern Ukraine. No human casualties were reported.

On 11 November, Ukrainian guerillas blew up the headquarters of the Russian military in Melitopol, killing at least three Russian servicemen. The attack took place during a meeting of officers from the FSB and the National Guard of Russia.

On 14 November, Ukrainian militants killed an unnamed collaborator in a car bombing in Starobilsk, Luhansk Oblast.

On 15 November, members of the Yellow Ribbon resistance group placed the Ukrainian flag on the peak of the Boyka Hora, a mountain near Yalta, Crimea. There were similar reports in late August of unknown people hoisting the Ukrainian flag on top of the Shaan-Kaya mountain near Alupka, which is located 15 kilometers southwest from Yalta.

On 21 November, Lt-Col. Oleh Shumilov and Lt-Col. Volodymyr Pakholenko were seriously injured when their car exploded in the city of Luhansk. Shumilov was deputy interior minister and Pakholenko a criminal investigator.

On 29 November, local partisans coordinated a precision strike by the Armed Forces of Ukraine in Yuvileine in Kherson Oblast. According to media reports, the missile hit its intended target and killed five Russian police officers and injured 17 employees of the facility in which a meeting between the police officers was ongoing. The strike also killed Police Major Arthur Dzhunusov, who was the Russian-installed deputy chief of police of the town and the surrounding area.

=== December ===
On 1 December, partisans reportedly attacked a Russian fuel tanker and number of Russian military personnel during a pit stop in Melitopol, Zaporizhzhia Oblast. According to the HUR, the attack resulted in an unspecified number of human casualties.

On 5 December, 24 Russian servicemen were reportedly killed and 11 more hospitalized after members of a local partisan group handed out poisoned groceries and alcoholic beverages in Simferopol, Crimea.

On 6 December, a car belonging to a Russian-installed deputy named Oleh Popov was blown up in the city center of Luhansk. RIA Novosti, a Russian news outlet, aired reports of an explosion near the Avanhard Stadium, but didn't specify whether anyone was injured in the explosion.

On 15 December, guerillas bombed a train, which was carrying ammunition and supplies in Zaporizhzhia Oblast. A day later, local resistance fighters wounded a Russian officer in a car bombing in Mariupol, Donetsk Oblast.

On 17 December, members of the Atesh movement published the coordinates of alleged Russian anti-aircraft installations in an online post near Sevastopol, Crimea. This is part of a supposed larger intelligence gathering operation by the group, as reports of an infiltration at a Russian military base in Feodosia surfaced five days earlier.

On 25 December, Atesh fighters posted footage of an infiltration into a Russian command post near the town of Novoozerne in northwestern Crimea.

In late December, Russian milbloggers reported that two "young saboteurs" had poisoned Russian personnel in Bakhchysarai, Crimea, with pies and beer that contained large doses of arsenic, rat poison and "a poison of unknown origin that experts are studying." They claimed that the killed 18 and hospitalized a further 14.

== 2024 ==
=== January ===
On 13 January, in Crimea, 46 Russian servicemen in Simferopol and Bakhchysarai were reportedly killed with poisoned vodka which was handed out by two young female partisans. Police were sent to apprehend them in a private house in Yalta and engaged in a shoot-out with the partisans, resulting in the deaths of three police officers and wounding of two more before the partisans fled the scene in a car.

On 15 January, a car carrying four Russian servicemen was blown up in Melitopol. According to initial reports, all four soldiers suffered injuries.

On 22 January, the 105th anniversary of the Ukrainian Unification Act, activists of the Yellow Ribbon movement positioned a large Ukrainian flag on top of the Pakhkal-Kaya mountain near Alushta, Crimea.

On 22 January, it was reported that partisans raised the Ukrainian flag in Makiivka, the third-largest city in Donetsk Oblast, which is occupied since 2014.

=== February ===
On 7 February, members of the Atesh movement published footage and coordinates of a concentration of Russian military equipment in Horlivka, Donetsk Oblast, Eastern Ukraine.

On 19 February, agents of the FSB killed a man who was reportedly planting an explosive charge under the car of a Russian-installed official in Melitopol, Zaporizhzhia Oblast.

On 22 February, it was reported that six members of the Russian Central Election Commission died in Mariupol after having been poisoned by partisans. A month before, three Russian servicemen died and ten more were hospitalized after a partisan cell handed out contaminated beverages, also in Mariupol.

On 27 February, a group of men triggered a police operation in Dzhankoi after a suspected infiltration attempt at a military airfield.

On 27 February, guerillas blew up the local headquarters of the United Russia party in occupied Nova Kakhovka, Kherson Oblast.

=== March ===
On 6 March, Svetlana Samoilenko, an organizer of the 2024 Russian presidential election and the Russian-appointed Deputy Mayor of Berdiansk was killed in a car bombing in the southern port city of Berdiansk, Zaporizhzhia Oblast.

On 10 March, Ihor Tsiferov, a collaborator from Dokuchaievsk, a small city south of Donetsk, was injured when his car was blown up in front of his house. Tsiferov was an employee of the Ministry of State Security of the self-proclaimed Donetsk People's Republic, which was involved in illegal abductions, acts of torture and other severe human rights violations since the beginning of the Russo-Ukrainian War in 2014.

On 15 March, partisans planted an IED inside a trashcan in front of a polling station in the Russian-occupied resort town of Skadovsk, Kherson Oblast. The guerillas claim that at least five Russian servicemen were injured when the device exploded.

On 17 March, it was reported that a woman vandalized a ballot box during the 2024 Russian presidential election by pouring green paint in it. The incident happened in Simferopol, the capital city of the occupied Autonomous Republic of Crimea.

On 22 March, two explosions took place in the occupied city of Melitopol. About 20 Russian soldiers were killed and two Kamaz tilt trucks and a UAZ were destroyed, according to an initial assessment of the Ukrainian military intelligence service.

=== April ===
On 1 April, Valerii Chaika, a pro-Russian collaborator and former employee of the local district administration was killed in the town of Starobilsk, Luhansk Oblast, when a homemade explosive device blew up his car.

On 4 April, a car bombing targeted Maxim Zubarev, the Russian-appointed mayor of Yakymivka, a town in the Russian-occupied part of the Zaporizhzhia Oblast. Zubarev was brought into hospital, where doctors described his condition as ″critical″, but according to preliminary reports, Zubarev survived the assassination attempt.

On 17 April, the Ukrainian Armed Forces struck an uncamouflaged S-400 missile system and a command post of the Russian Armed Forces near the airfield of the Crimean city of Dzhankoi. A few days before, Atesh guerillas shared the location of the complex in an online post, asking for immediate action from the Ukrainian military.

=== May ===
On 5 May, a Russian collaborator and employee of a local penal colony was killed when an improvised explosive device blew up his car in occupied Berdiansk, Zaporizhzhia Oblast. The Russian occupation authorities subsequently announced the start of a criminal investigation and stated that an unknown person planted the explosive charge on the underbody of the vehicle.

On 20 May, residents of Yuvileine in the Luhansk Oblast coordinated a Ukrainian rocket strike on a Russian military base.

On 21 May, the local pro-Ukrainian militant group ″Ї″ set fire to a warehouse in the port city of Mariupol, Donetsk Oblast, which was used by the Russian Armed Forces to store construction materials and other belongings.

On 31 May, a 40-year-old resident of Crimea stabbed two Russian military members to death in Alushta.

On 31 May, a partisan cell claimed responsibility for an arson attack on the car of an unnamed pro-Russian collaborator in occupied Mariupol, Eastern Ukraine.

=== June ===
On 2 June, a Russian serviceman posted a video in which he accused employees of a local shop in Ivanivka, Kherson Oblast of trying to poison him and his comrades with pills, which they tried to dissolve in Fanta soft drink bottles.

On 7 June, Atesh guerillas guided a Ukrainian missile strike that targeted an oil depot in Luhansk, Eastern Ukraine.

On 11 June, Atesh partisans published footage and the coordinates of a Russian makeshift ammunition depot and communication hub in Mariupol, Donetsk Oblast.

On 23 June, partisans claimed to have sabotaged a railway line connecting Mariupol and Rostov-on-Don by setting fire to a relay cabinet.

On 26 June, Atesh guerillas claimed to have infiltrated another Russian ammunition depot on the premises of an abandoned farmstead in the village of Zakharivka, Donetsk Oblast. According to the partisans, the Russian military used the site to store artillery shells and announced that they handed over the coordinates to the Armed Forces of Ukraine.

=== July ===
On 6 July, a partisan group claimed responsibility for sabotaging a gas pipeline near Vynohradne, a small settlement on the Crimean Riviera northeast of Yalta. The alleged attack resulted in a large fire, which affected 4,172 square meters of terrain, and threatened to spread into a dry, forested area for a short period of time. According to the local Russian occupation authorities, the blaze left 12 settlements without any gas supply, and stated it would take 7 to 10 days to repair the damaged facility.

On 12 July, Atesh guerillas claimed to have set fire to a dry field near Oleshky in Kherson Oblast. According to the partisans, the fire quickly encroached towards nearby Russian military positions, severely burning twenty Russian servicemen and causing a chain of explosions when ammunition stored in the trenches was triggered.

On 22 July, Ukrainian resistance fighters reportedly killed 12 Russian soldiers in Mariupol by selling them prepped watermelons, which contained poisonous substances.

On 23 July, Atesh militants and local residents coordinated a Ukrainian air strike on a military airfield in the Saky Raion, Russian-occupied Autonomous Republic of Crimea.

On 30 July, roughly 56,000 residents were left without power and running water, after four blazes engulfed at various substations in occupied Kerch, Crimea. According to Russian media outlets, the fires broke out simultaneously in the villages of Bondarenkove and Osovyny, as well as at the 450 Block and Mount Mithridat substations, which are located within the city limits. The Russian occupation authorities stated that sabotage might be the cause for the fires.

=== August ===
On 4 August, members of the Atesh movement set fire to a relay cabinet in Donetsk. The partisans claim that the railroad, which runs through the eastern Kalininskyi and Budionnivskyi districts of the city, is a vital supply line for the Russian military and mainly supports the Russian grouping near Toretsk.

On 23 August, the Day of the National Flag of Ukraine, Yellow Ribbon activists launched a coordinated effort in the occupied eastern city of Donetsk, and spray painted the Ukrainian flag in multiple districts of the city, namely in the areas near the former Zaperevalna Mine, the 122nd Gymnasium, and on Antropova, Danilevsky and Hornostaivska Street.

On 25 August, pro-Russian Telegram channels reported that pro-Ukrainian militants managed to enter a makeshift barracks of the Russian military near Simferopol, where they stabbed 18 soldiers to death. It was also noted that this was not an isolated incident on the Russian-occupied Crimean peninsula, and that similar incidents happened near Sevastopol and Yevpatoria a year earlier.

On 28 August, Atesh partisans reportedly set fire to another relay cabinet in Southeastern Ukraine. According to the guerillas, the railway connecting Rostov-on-Don and the Russian-occupied cities of Mariupol and Berdiansk is of high strategic value, since it would serve as the main supply line for all Russian troops in Southern Ukraine in case of the destruction of the Crimean Bridge.

=== September–October ===
On 11 September, Atesh partisans posted a picture and the coordinates of a Russian S-300 air defense complex near occupied Chonhar, Kherson Oblast.

On 21 September, Atesh partisans infiltrated a Russian ammunition depot in the village of Vyshniuvate, Zaporizhzhia Oblast. A similar incident happened a day earlier, when guerillas from the same group entered a field depot belonging to the 36th Separate Guards Motor Rifle Brigade of the Russian Armed Forces in the Starobesheve Raion, Donetsk Oblast.

On 1 October, Ukrainian partisans targeted a Lada 110 motor vehicle in a car bombing, which was reportedly carrying three Russian servicemen in the occupied city of Melitopol, Zaporizhzhia Oblast.

On 2 October, a car bomb killed Vitaliy Lomeiko in Berdiansk, Zaporizhzhia Oblast. Lomeiko was a local judge, who remained in Berdiansk after Russian military forces occupied the city, and was involved in many cases of collaboration since early 2022.

On 4 October, a homemade car bomb killed Andriy Korotkyi in Enerhodar, occupied Zaporizhzhia Oblast. The victim served as the Russian-installed Head of Physical Security at the Zaporizhzhia Nuclear Power Plant and was involved in organizing anti-Ukrainian propaganda events in the city.

On 13 October, Atesh guerillas destroyed a Russian reconnaissance vehicle by setting fire to it in Novokaterynivka, a rural town near Starobesheve, Donetsk Oblast.

On 14 October, the local Ukrainian partisan group 'SROK' posted footage from the infiltration of a training ground in Sartana, southeastern Donetsk Oblast. The grounds were reportedly used by North Korean military instructors in order to prepare possible frontline operations of the Korean People's Army in Ukraine. It was also noted that the KPA instructors can operate in relative safety, since a significant share of the remaining residents in the municipality - which is home to a large ethnic Russian minority - were holding pro-Russian views and supported the occupation authorities.

On 18 October, Dmitry Pervukha, a major of the Russian Armed Forces, was reportedly killed by an explosive while driving his car in the city center of Luhansk, Eastern Ukraine. The explosion, which was audible throughout the entire city, also injured a woman and destroyed the vehicle of the victim, as well as damaging two others.

On 20 October, Atesh partisans sabotaged a railway line near Novooleksiivka in the southern Kherson Oblast, which serves as a highly important supply line for the Russian military in Southern Ukraine.

On 27 October, Ukrainian partisans blew up a railway bridge in the center of Berdiansk, Zaporizhzhia Oblast. The powerful explosion targeted an overpass near a car wash on Skhidniy Avenue, which is located less than a kilometer north of the city's main station.

=== November ===
On 13 November 47-year-old Valery Trankovsky, a 1st rank Captain of the Russian Black Sea Fleet was reportedly killed in a car bombing in Sevastopol, occupied Crimea. The Russian-installed mayor of the city Mikhail Razvozhayev said that an investigation of the incident was underway and noted that ″the possibility of sabotage cannot be ruled out″.

On 17 November, Atesh gueriilas set fire a relay cabinet between Tokmak and Kamianka, occupied Zaporizhzhia Oblast.

On 18 November, Ukrainian partisans sabotaged another railway line near Kalchyk, a settlement north of Mariupol in the Russian-occupied part of the Donetsk Oblast. The attack led to the collision of two locomotives and damaged a section of the overhead lines.

On 18 November, pro-Ukrainian activsts belonging to the Yellow Ribbon movement hoisted a Ukrainian flag on top of the Ilyas-Kaya massif near Foros, Southern Crimea.

On 26 November, partisans belonging to the Atesh movement sabotaged another railway line by destroying a relay cabinet near Novooleksiivka, a town on the administrative border between the Kherson Oblast and Autonomous Republic of Crimea.

On 27 November, Atesh militants published an online post, in which they called on the Ukrainian military to target a concentration of Russian S-400 air defense systems near the settlement of Molochne in the Saky Raion, Crimea. On 29 November, the Ukrainian Armed Forces carried out a successful missile strike in the area, which according to initial reports, targeted a Russian air defense system of the same type.

=== December ===
On 9 December, Serhiy Yevsiukov and his wife were targeted in a car bombing in the Russian-occupied regional capital of Donetsk. Russian Telegram channels reported that Yevsiukov was killed in the explosion, while his wife suffered severe injuries and lost a leg. Yevsiukov served as the head of the Olenivka filtration camp, which became the scene of a massacre that targeted Ukrainian prisoners of war.

On 16 December, Atesh guerillas uncovered large Russian fortifications, which included observation posts, bunkers and supply depots. The fortifications, which are supposed to protect the Russian-occupied Crimean peninsula from any possible Ukrainian attempts to recapture the region, stretch from the village of Vyshnivka in the northern Perekopsk district to the district capital of Krasnoperekopsk.

On 18 December, a commander of the Akhmat regiment suffered severe injuries when he was targeted in a car bombing in Russian-occupied Skadovsk, Kherson Oblast.

On 24 December, Vasyl Nechet, the Russian-installed head of the city council of Berdiansk in the Zaporizhzhia Oblast, was wounded when he was targeted in a suspected car bombing. The local partisan movement 'Zla Mavak' reported that the explosion happened in front of a residential building and that Nechet was hospitalized, but also stated that his exact condition was unknown.

On 26 December, a Russian court sentenced Pavlo Levchenko, a citizen from the Crimean capital of Simferopol, to 22 years in prison after being charged on multiple counts, which included "high treason" and "terrorist activities" for reportedly blowing up railway infrastructure on the territory of Crimea. According to the Ukrainian government-affiliated news oulet Ukrinform, Levchenko's indictment wasn't an isolated case, and stated that another resident of Simferopol was sentenced to 10 years in prison on similar charges by a Russian court earlier this year.

On 27 December, unknown assailants reportedly set fire to a car belonging to a high-ranking Russian military officer in Melitopol, Zaporizhzhia Oblast, Russian-occupied Southern Ukraine.

== 2025 ==
=== January ===
On 7 January, Atesh partisans uncovered a command post of the Russian military on the premises of a sanatorium resort near the Crimean beach town of Fedorivka in the Saky district. The militant group posted the location in an online post and called on the Armed Forces of Ukraine to target the location.

On 22 January, Ukrainian guerillas set fire to a utility vehicle belonging to the Russian Armed Forces in the city of Donetsk. The attack happened near the base of the Kalmius Brigade, a unit which was formerly part of local Moscow-backed ethnic Russian militias in Eastern Ukraine.

On 29 January, Atesh militants announced that they mapped out the locations of multiple Russian warehouses in Crimea by tracking the movement of large fuel shipments.

=== February ===
On 2 February, pro-Ukrainian posters and graffiti started to appear in the Crimean cities of Simferopol, Feodosia and Bakhchysarai with messages like: "Simferopol - Ukrainian city" or "Crimea is waiting for the AFU", as well as "Crimea is Ukraine". Yellow Ribbon, the organization behind those acts of protest, also noted that they have established communities in all major cities on the peninsula, but also in smaller towns like Simeiz and Balaklava, which are engaged in acts of psychological warfare.

On 4 February, reports arose of an increase in disappearances among Russian military personnel in Tokmak and Melitopol in Russian-controlled parts of Zaporizhzhia Oblast. In addition to desertions and infighting, it is rumored that at least one serviceman was killed by local residents, who are overwhelmingly opposed to the Russian occupation regime.

On 14 February, with the help of forcefully conscripted Ukrainians from the Luhansk region, pro-Ukrainian partisans belonging to the Atesh movement entered a large Russian ammunition depot in the city of Luhansk, and reportedly handed over the location to the Ukrainian Armed Forces.

On 15 February, Atesh guerillas sabotaged a Russian RP-377LA electronic warfare vehicle in the occupied portion of the Donetsk Oblast by pouring sugar into its fuel tank.

On 20 February, Yevgeny Bogdanov, the Russian-installed deputy head of the city administration of Berdiansk in the Zaporizhzhia Oblast, was killed when a car bomb attached to his Renault Duster touched off at about 6:05am local time on Skhidnyi Avenue in Berdiansk. Bogdanov, who was a Russian citizen from Pikalyovo in the Leningrad Oblast, arrived in the city after it was captured by Russian forces and was responsible for financial affairs, as well as for the construction of fortifications in the region. He was repeatedly accused of committing war crimes during his stay in Ukraine.

On 28 February, Ukrainian partisans targeted an employee of the FSB in a car bombing in the occupied city of Mariupol in Donetsk Oblast. The attack, which happened at about 01:00am local time in the Prymorskyi district in the western part of the city, injured the Russian serviceman severely and resulted in him being hospitalized in a critical condition.

=== March ===
On 9 March, Atesh partisans sabotaged a railway line near the village of Stolbove in the Dzhankoi district, northern Crimea. The partisan group stated that the railway line was a vital supply line for the Russian Armed Forces in the Zaporizhzhia Oblast.

On 12 March, Ukrainian partisans blew up a railway line with an improvised explosive device, which according to them, was of "critical nature" for the logistics of the Russian military. The attack happened near the winegrowing village of Pervomaika in the southern Crimean Balaklava District near Sevastopol.

On 18 March, which marked the 11th anniversary of Russia's unilateral annexation of Crimea, Crimean pro-Ukrainian activists belonging to the Yellow Ribbon movement reportedly started a coordinated effort in all major Crimean cities to protest against the ongoing Russian occupation of the peninsula. The activist distributed stickers and symbols, but also installed a Ukrainian flag on top of the Basman Hora peak near Hurzuf in Southern Crimea.

On 19 March, Ukrainian partisans destroyed a Russian electronic warfare system and a transportation vehicle in an arson attack in the Budionnivskyi District, which is located in the southeastern part of the Russian-occupied regional capital of Donetsk, Eastern Ukraine.

On 20 March, Ukrainian partisans reportedly killed two Russian military officers in a car bombing in the occupied resort town of Skadovsk, Kherson Oblast. The attack happened at 08:40pm local time on Myru Street, which is located on the northern edge of the settlement, and destroyed the vehicle beyond recognition.

On 23 March, Ukrainian partisans set fire to a Russian military base and a nearby ammunition depot in the Russian-occupied port city of Mariupol, Eastern Ukraine. Multiple vehicles were reportedly destroyed as the result of the attack, as well as an unspecified amount of ammunition.

On 29 March, pro-Ukrainian guerillas in the Russian-occupied part of the Kherson Oblast destroyed another Russian electronic warfare vehicle of the type "Lorandit" in a nightime arson attack.

=== April ===
On 3 April, a Russian "Tigr" infantry mobility vehicle, which was carrying Russia-affiliated Chechen soldiers, was ambushed by Ukrainian resistance fighters in the occupied city of Melitopol, Zaporizhzhia Oblast. The attack reportedly resulted in five casualties among the Russian servicemen.

On 7 April, a court in Russian-occupied Donetsk sentenced a 17-year-old Ukrainian boy from Dokuchaevsk in Donetsk Oblast to 6.5 years in prison on "treason" charges. According to the Russian prosecutors, the boy used his mobile phone to transfer information about Russian military positions to Ukrainian intelligence services.

On 8 April, Ukrainian partisans infiltrated a Russian supply depot near Kindratove in the Dzhankoi Raion, northern Crimea. The partisans suggest that the Russian military is concentrating equipment in the area with the intend of transferring it to the frontlines in mainland Ukraine via the nearby Azovske railway station.

On 16 April, Ukrainian partisans from the Atesh guerrilla movement set fire to a railway traffic control system in Melitopol. According to local pro-Ukrainian activists, the city in the Russian-occupied southern half of Zaporizhzhia Oblast serves as a crucial logistical hub in the region.

On 27 April, Ukrainian partisans successfully sabotaged a railway line near Stanytsia Luhanska in the Russian-occupied part of the Luhansk Oblast by setting fire to a relay cabinet.

=== May ===
On 14 May, a local Ukrainian partisan cell in the southern Kherson Oblast torched an electrical shaft on a railway line near the village of Oleksiivka in the Henichesk district, rendering it useless as the result of the attack.

On 15 May, the FSB arrested a 51-year-old and a 54-year-old man in Russian-occupied Sevastopol for allegedly transferring data on missile strike targets to Ukrainian intelligence services. The Russian-installed authorities also claimed to have seized explosive devices and detonators when they raided the house. The two men were charged with "treason" under Article 275 of the Criminal Code of the Russian Federation.

On 20 May, unknown assailants ambushed a Russian UAZ Patriot vehicle with an improvised explosive device when it was driving between the cities of Skadovsk and Antonivka in occupied part of the Kherson Oblast. The attack reportedly killed four Russian servicemen from Chechnya.

On 21 May, Atesh guerillas destroyed an electronical warfare vehicle in Henichesk, southeastern Kherson Oblast.

On 21 May, a court in occupied Sevastopol sentenced a local man to 18 years in a high-security penal colony on "treason" charges for allegedly aiding the Ukrainian Armed Forces, particularly by "searching and moving ammunition caches on the territory of the Crimean peninsula".

On 31 May, Ukrainian guerillas reportedly used an improvised explosive device in an attack on a train, which was carrying Russian military supplies near Yakymivka in the Melitopol district, Zaporizhzhia Oblast. The bombing resulted the derailment of multiple wagons.

=== June ===
On 1 June, pro-Ukrainian militants belonging to the Atesh movement blew up a section of a newly constructed railway line between the cities of Volnovakha and Mariupol in the Russian-occupied part of the Donetsk Oblast.

On 10 June, Ukrainian partisans destroyed a vehicle belonging to a Russian drone detachment in a nighttime raid in Melitopol, Russian-occupied Zaporizhzhia Oblast.

On 12 June, Ukrainian insurgents from Melitopol launched another attack on Russian security forces, in which partisans from the Atesh movement set fire to an Ural truck in a nighttime raid. In addition to the destroyed vehicle, the guerillas claimed to also have killed several servicemen at the site, who likely were resting inside the driver's cabin.

On 18 June, unknown attackers gunned down Mykhailo Hrytsai, a local collaborator from occupied Berdiansk in Zaporizhzhia Oblast, he temporarily served as the Russian-installed mayor of the city. According to the Ukrainian military intelligence service, he was involved in various war crimes such as torture and helped organize the arrests of multiple pro-Ukrainian residents who continued to openly defy Russian occupation. Hrytsai did not survive the attempt on his life.

On 28 June, Atesh partisans destroyed a signal cabinet next to a railway line in Yasynuvata, Donetsk Oblast.

=== July ===
On 3 July, Manolis Pilavov, the former Russian-installed Mayor of Luhansk, was killed by an improvised explosive device on Taras Shevchenko Street in Luhansk. Pilavov was installed by pro-Russian separatists in late 2014, after his predecessor left the city for government-controlled territory. He held office until late 2023 and was charged with assisting armed groups by Ukrainian authorities.

On 4 July, three Russian drone operators from the Bars-Sarmat special purpose center were killed by an explosive device that exploded within their Chevrolet Aveo near the village of Strilkove, Kherson Oblast.

On 6 July, Ukrainian partisans burned another relay cabinet in the railway town of Debaltseve, Donetsk Oblast. The partisans claimed that the attack led to the disruption of railway traffic and that the town was an important logistical hub for the Russian Armed Forces.

On 10 July, Ukrainian partisans destroyed a railway control box in a nighttime arson attack near the town of Uvarove, Crimea.

On 10 July, with the assistance of Ukrainian military intelligence services, local pro-Ukrainian partisans attacked a command post of the National Guard of Russia in the city of Melitopol, occupied Zaporizhzhia Oblast. The plot reportedly killed five Russian soldiers and led to the destruction of vital communication assets.

On 13 July, guerillas belonging to the Atesh movement targeted a car used by Chechen soldiers in an arson attack in occupied Mariupol, Donetsk Oblast. The vehicle suffered irreparable damage, yet no human casualties were reported.

On 17 July, Russian Telegram channels reported that at least four Russian servicemen died and that multiple more suffered seizures after unknown people handed out poisoned water canisters as "aid" for the Russian military in Panteleimonivka, Donetsk region.

On 27 July, another relay cabinet next to a railway line in Novooleksiivka in the southern Kherson Oblast was destroyed in an arson attack, for which Ukrainian militants claimed responsibility in an online post.

=== August ===
On 2 August, five Russia-affiliated Chechen soldiers died in the city of Melitopol in the occupied part of Zaporizhzhia Oblast when Ukrainian partisans ambushed their car by using an IED.

On 3 August, Ukrainian militants belonging to the Atesh partisan movement burned a relay cabinet on a railway line north of Berdiansk, Zaporizhzhia Oblast. According to the partisans, the attack led to the interruption of railway traffic for a significant amount of time and delayed fuel shipments for the Russian Armed Forces in the region.

On 17 August, Ukrainian partisans sabotaged a railway line in the northern Luhansk Oblast in Russian-occupied Eastern Ukraine by setting fire to another relay cabinet. According to the militants, the railway is of significant logistical importance for the Russian military, as it directly connects the Rostov region in Russia with the northern part of Ukraine's easternmost province.

On 22 August, a Russian supply convoy belonging to a military unit, which participated in the Bucha Massacre, was ambushed in the town of Kalynove near the city of Pervomaisk in the western Luhansk Oblast. In addition to material damage, the attack resulted in the death of three Russian soldiers, while two more servicemen suffered injuries.

On 24 August, Ukrainian militants blew up a railway control cabinet near occupied Melitopol, Zaporizhzhia Oblast.

On 30 August, 18 Russian soldiers were reportedly killed in an arson attack, after unknown assailants set fire to a field near a Russian command post on the outskirts the occupied town of Voskresenka in the Zaporizhzhia Oblast.

=== September ===
On 2 September, Ukrainian partisans carried out another attack on railway infrastructure near the town of Debaltseve in the Donetsk Oblast, which was already previously described as an important logistical hub in Russian-occupied Eastern Ukraine.

On 4 September, local guerillas belonging to the Atesh partisan movement helped guiding a Ukrainian missile strike that targeted an oil depot in the occupied city of Luhansk, Eastern Ukraine.

On 6 September, activists of the Yellow Ribbon movement claimed responsibility for distributing Ukrainian flags and ribbons, as well as for hanging posters in the cities of Donetsk, Luhansk, Perevalsk and Alchevsk, occupied Eastern Ukraine.

On 25 September, Ukrainian partisans set fire to a fuel truck and a UAZ vehicle belonging to the Russian Armed Forces in a nightime attack near Berdiansk, Zaporizhzhia Oblast.

On 28 September, Ukrainian guerillas from the Donetsk Oblast sabotaged a railway line in Volnovakha by destroying a relay cabinet in an arson attack. According to the partisans, the attack aimed at hindering the delivery of ammunition, equipment, and personnel to the frontline.

=== October ===
On 1 October, the former Russian-installed mayor of Nova Kakhovka turned strongman of the Kakhovka Raion, Volodymyr Leontiev, was killed by a Ukrainian "Baba Yaga drone". (Note: That Leontyev was killed by a Ukrainian drone was claimed by the Russian-installed/collaborationist governor of annexed Kherson Oblast Vladimir Saldo.)

On 6 October, Ukrainian guerillas destroyed a relay cabinet in an arson attack near the settlement of Chernihivka in the Zaporizhzhia Oblast, rendering the railway line inoperable.

On 18 October, the Ukrainian Armed Forces struck a Russian BUK-M1 air defense system near Tokmak, which was previously uncovered by Ukrainian partisans, who published pictures in an online post, and reportedly passed on its location to the Ukrainian military.

On 23 October, an explosive device touched off near the regional parliament of the Luhansk Oblast in the city of Luhansk, occupied Eastern Ukraine. According to both Ukrainian and Russian media sources, the blast injured at least two persons, including an elderly man, who later died in hospital. Following the commencing of an investigation, Russian occupation authorities stated the explosion could be attributed to pro-Ukrainian militants, while Ukrainian media outlets published conflicting reports by locals, according to which a hand grenade was detonated as the result of a family dispute, or which blamed the Federal Security Service of the Russian Federation for staging a false flag attack.

On 26 October, pro-Ukrainian partisans blew up a section of a railway line near the settlement of Chernihivka in the Zaporizhzhia Oblast. The explosion led to the derailment of a locomotive and at least ten railroad cars. No human casualties were reported.

On 26 October, Ukrainian partisans disabled a section of a railway line in an arson attack near the settlement of Piatykhatka, Russian-occupied Crimea. The railway line, which is connecting the northern Crimean Perekopsk and Armiansk districts, leads further north to the Kherson region, and is considered to be a vital supply line for the Russian Armed Forces in the region.

On 29 October, Ukrainian guerillas belonging to the Atesh guerilla movement interrupted railway traffic in the town of Tokmak in the Zaporihzhia region by burning a railway control cabinet.

=== November ===
On 9 November, Ukrainian militants burned a relay cabinet in the northern suburbs of the regional capital of Simferopol, Russian-occupied Crimea. The partisans stated that the attack aimed at halting northbound railway traffic.

On 16 November, Ukrainian militants belonging to the Atesh movement sabotaged a section of a railway line in Novobohdanivka, a settlement near the city of Melitopol, Zaporizhzhia Oblast.

On 29 November, with the aid of the Ukrainian military intelligence services, Ukrainian partisans attacked a concentration of vehicles belonging to a Chechen unit of the Russian National Guard near the city of Berdiansk, Zaporizhzhia Oblast. According to Ukrainian sources, the blast resulted in multiple casualties among the Russian servicemen. In late July, they carried out a similar attack that killed three Russian National Guardsmen with no losses of their own.

=== December ===
On 1 December, the FSB stated that they have killed a Ukrainian allegedly recruited by the HUR and arrested another for attempted to assassinate a military official in Crimea.

On 5 December, Ukrainian militants blew up a Lada Niva, which was carrying Russian soldiers by using a roadside explosive in the coastal town of Skadovsk, Kherson Oblast.

On 16 December, hundreds of leaflets with pro-Ukrainian messages defying the Russian occupation started to appear in the occupied city of Luhansk, Eastern Ukraine. The Ukrainian partisan organization Atesh claimed responsibility for the campaign.

On 27 December, Ukrainian militants raided and destroyed a communication hub of the Russian Armed Forces in a nighttime attack in the village of Vasylivka, a suburb of Berdiansk in the Zaporizhzhia Oblast.

== 2026 ==
=== January ===
On 2 January, the Atesh partisan movement claimed responsibility for another agitation campaign in Luhansk, after posters and leaflets with messages defying the Russian occupation appeared in various parts of the city.

On 12 January, Ukrainian partisans issued intimidation letters to the Russian-appointed Prosecutor's Office of Crimea in the regional capital of Simferopol, and subsequently posted pictures of the building online, threatening that they will use deadly violence against employees of the authority, who according to the partisans, are "direct accomplices in crimes against Ukraine".

On 22 January, Ruslan Yevdokimov, a Russian major general and commander of the 98th Guards Airborne Division of the Russian Armed Forces, who previously served in the Syrian Civil War, was wounded when a roadside explosive detonated while he was driving through the village of Kostohryzove, occupied Kherson Oblast.

=== February ===
On 1 February, Ukrainian partisans claimed responsibility for blowing up a transformer cabinet of a radio tower near the village of Strilkove on the Arabat Spit, which is located in the southern Kherson Oblast.

On 8 February, pro-Ukrainian Atesh partisans claimed to disable Russian military communication infrastructure by setting fire to a hardware module at the base of a communication tower near the Ukrainian border in Belgorod Oblast.

On 26 February, Ukrainian partisans destroyed antennas belonging to Russian electronic warfare installations in an arson attack near the city of Sevastopol, southern Crimea.

=== March ===
On 3 March, Ukrainian partisans set fire to two relay cabinets next to a railway line in the settlements of Oleksandrivsk and Velyka Verhunka in the Luhansk Oblast. The arson attack led to the disruption of railway traffic.

On 15 March, Ukrainian guerillas in the Luhansk Oblast cut power to the headquarters of the 123rd Separate Guards Motor Rifle Brigade of the Russian Armed Forces in the city of Sieverodonetsk by setting fire to a transformer cabinet in the vicinity of the command post.

On 16 March, militants belonging to the Atesh movement claimed to have identified a large Russian supply shipment at the train station of Dzhankoi, Russian-occupied Crimea. The partisans stated that they have passed on the location and the routing data of the train to the Ukrainian Armed Forces.

On 18 March, Ukrainian partisans destroyed a parked up diesel locomotive in an arson attack at a train station in Simferopol, Crimea. The partisans claimed in an online post that the railway line is used to supply Russian troops in the Zaporizhzhia Oblast.

On 20 March, Bring Kids Back UA reported that a Russian court in Rostov-on-Don sentenced three Ukrainian teenagers from Melitopol in the Zaporizhzhia Oblast to prison sentences ranging from 7 to 8.5 years. The teenagers by the names of Viktor Azarovskyi, Oleh Shokol and Denys Vasylyk were arrested in late 2023, and were subsequently indicted on terrorism charges by Russian authorities.

On 26 March, Ukrainian militants set fire to another relay cabinet in the northern outskirts of the regional capital of Luhansk, Russian-occupied Eastern Ukraine.

=== April ===
On 2 April, leaflets and posters with QR codes calling on residents to resist and pass on informations on the movement of Russian forces started to appear in the occupied city of Enerhodar in the Zaporizhzhia Oblast.

On 18 April, the Ukrainian government-affiliated news outlet Ukrinform reported that guerillas sabotaged a railway line near in the city of Luhansk in occupied Eastern Ukraine by setting fire to a transformer.

On 29 April, Ukrainian activists from Sieverodonetsk in the Luhansk region set fire to a large sign picturing a recruitment advertisement of the Russian Armed Forces, and posted footage of the arson attack in an online post.

=== May–June ===
On 3 May, guerillas in the Luhansk Oblast destroyed a KamAZ supply truck belonging to the Russian military in a nighttime attack.

On 28 May, a court in the Russian-occupied Luhansk Oblast sentenced a 57-year-old Ukrainian man named Kostyantyn Miroshnichenko to over 13 years in maximum-security penal colony for reporting Russian troop movements to Ukrainian intelligence services. On the same day, the Russian-installed Regional Prosecutor’s Office approved one more indictment against another man from the Luhansk Oblast, who is also accused of transferring information about Russian deployment locations on multiple occasions to the Ukrainian military.

On 9 June, Ukrainian partisans posted footage of an infiltration on the premises of Russian radar installations near the Crimean city of Yevpatoria, which were later targeted by Ukrainian aerial strikes.

=== July–August ===
On 21 July, the Ukrainian media outlet Apostrophe reported that Ukrainian guerillas launched a series of attacks on Russian military vehicles on the Highway M14 (by Russian-installed authorities referred to as "R280-Highway") in occupied Southern and Eastern Ukraine.

On 13 August, an improvised explosive device killed Captain 1st rank Robert Shageev in Sevastopol, occupied Crimea. Shageev was an officer serving in the Ukrainian Navy, who defected to Russia following the Russian occupation of Crimea in 2014.

On 13 August, Ukrainian partisans claimed to have set fire to a communications tower near the Ukrainian-Russian border near the village of Pylna in the Kharkiv Oblast.

On 16 August, activists claimed responsibility for distributing leaflets defying the Russian occupation with messages like "Together against the regime" in occupied Sieverodonetsk, Luhansk Oblast.

On 25 August, a 70-year-old Ukrainian woman named Svitlana Loi from the Russian-occupied part of the Zaporizhzhia Oblast was sentenced to 15 years in prison on "state treason" charges for transferring roughly 630€ to the Armed Forces of Ukraine in 2024. The case gained international attention when Loi started to sing a Ukrainian folk song as a gesture of defiance during the reading of her sentence.

=== September-October ===
On 2 September, a Mazda car was targeted in an IED attack in Sevastopol, occupied Crimea. The driver of the car, who reportedly is a serviceman of the Russian Armed Forces, suffered serious injuries from the blast and was rushed into a hospital.

On 30 September, Ukrainian news outlets reported that Ukrainian militants sabotaged multiple railway lines near the town of Luhanske in the Donetsk Oblast, and near the settlements of Rozivka and Molochansk in the Zaporizhzhia Oblast.

== See also ==
- Russian partisan movement (2022–present)
- 2022 protests in Russian-occupied Ukraine
- Collaboration with Russia during the Russian invasion of Ukraine
- Russian-occupied territories of Ukraine
