= Popular Resistance of Ukraine =

Ukrainian underground partisan organization

- Народний спротив України
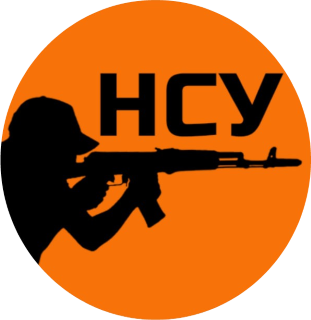
- NSU logo
- Founded: 17 September 2021
- Dates active: 2022–present
- Country: Ukraine
- Ideology: Ukrainian nationalism; Anti-imperialism; Anti-Putinism
- Political position: Big tent
- Website: Popular Resistance of Ukraine on Telegram

The Popular Resistance of Ukraine (Ukrainian: Народний спротив України (НСУ), romanized: Narodnyy sprotyv Ukrainy, NSU) is a Ukrainian underground partisan organization operating in the territories of Ukraine occupied by Russian troops during the invasion of the country. The partisans operate in the rear and transmit the coordinates of important military facilities and the deployment of Russian troops to the Armed Forces of Ukraine.

== History ==
The NSU Telegram channel was created on 17 September 2021, and at first opposed the organization of elections to the authorities of the Russian Federation on the territory of Donbas, Ukraine.

A month before the invasion, in January, the Ukrainian Defense Ministry organized popular resistance forces in the event of a Russian attack.

It was reported that in early June, with the assistance of NSU partisans, a group of Russian special forces of the Akhmat unit disappeared.

In mid-June, postcards-warnings were left in Kherson from the NSU with the content: "Russian, we will turn you into minced meat"; "Occupier, below are your friends. You're next"; "Russian soldier, your brothers are already waiting for you. Get ready to die. Kherson is Ukraine"; "Russian occupier, surrender or die a painful death. The popular resistance of Ukraine is already watching you. Look around."

On 23 August 2022, the state flag day of Ukraine, leaflets of the "People's Resistance of Ukraine" appeared in the occupied Kherson Oblast (in Tavriisk, Kakhovka and Nova Kakhovka). In Kherson, one of the monuments was wrapped in the flag of Ukraine.

On 24 August, leaflets dedicated to the Independence Day of Ukraine appeared in the occupied territories. Leaflets were also scattered warning about the consequences of holding a referendum on the annexation of territories to Russia.

== See also ==
- Belarusian and Russian partisan movement (2022–present)
- 2022 Russian military commissariats attacks
- Ukrainian resistance in Russian-occupied Ukraine
- Rukh Oporu
