= Vira Naydyonova =

Ukrainian industrialist

Hero of Ukraine Vira Naydyonova
- Віра Найдьонова
- Born: 5 August 1948; Zaozerne, Ukrainian SSR, Soviet Union
- Died: 30 April 2016 (aged 67); Tavrychanka, Ukraine
- Occupations: Industrialist; manager
- Years active: 1966–2016
- Awards: Order of Princess Olga, Third Class; Hero of Ukraine

Vira Opanasivna Naydyonova (Ukrainian: Віра Опанасівна Найдьонова; 5 August 1948 – 30 April 2016) was a Ukrainian industrialist and manager who directed the middle-class state research farm Askaniyske from 1985 to 2016 and oversaw its development. Before that, she was an accountant and cashier at Tavrychan Village Council in Kakhovka and was chair of Tavrychanka's village council executive committee council of people's deputies. Naydyonova chaired the Askani Fleece State Research and Production Association of the Southern Region, which includes the Askaniyske Research Farm, from 2001 to 2016. She was a recipient of honorary awards such as the Order of Princess Olga and the Hero of Ukraine.

== Early life and education ==
On 5 August 1948, Naydyonova was born in the village of Zaozerne in the Kherson Oblast, Kakhovka Raion. Her mother was a kindergarten teacher and an election commission leader. Naydyonova liked studying history, geometry, mathematics and Ukrainian. She was a graduate of the Faculty of Agricultural Planning of the Kyiv National Economic University. Naydyonova's major was in economics, and was a member of the Communist Party of the Soviet Union.

== Career ==
From 1966 to 1968, Naydyonova worked as a accountant and cashier at Tavrychan village council in Kakhovka, Kherson Oblast. She went on to work as head of the communication department of Tavrychanka village between 1968 and 1969. Naydyonova was secretary of Tavrychanka's village council executive committee council of people's deputies from 1969 to 1981. She was appointed its chair in 1981 and remained in the post until 1984.

Naydyonova was appointed secretary of the Askani state farm of the Kakhovka district's party committee from 1984 to 1985. In 1985, she was appointed director of a middle-class area secondary state farm of nearly 8,700 ha (21,000 acres) in the Kakhovka district which became the research farm Askaniyske on 1 October 1991. She observed rural roads repaved and the construction of infrastructure in the local area. Naydyonova worked to develop agriculture, dairy and meat farming at the farm as technological advancements of domestic agrarian productions in the selection of agricultural crops, seed production, breeding cattle and sheep were introduced on the farm's irrigated lands. This led the farm to become one of the best in the Kherson Oblast and of the National Academy of Agrarian Sciences of Ukraine system.

Between 26 July 2001 to 30 April 2016, Naydyonova chaired the Askani Fleece State Research and Production Association of the Southern Region, which includes the Askaniyske Research Farm. She was a proxy of the parliamentary candidate Viktor Yushchenko in the 188th electoral district. Naydyonova was a member of Kherson Regional Council between 2006 and 2010. She died on 30 April 2016 after suffering from an illness for a long period of time and was given a funeral on 2 May 2016. Naydyonova was buried at St. Basil the Great Church in Tavrychanka.

== Awards ==
Naydyonova was the recipient of multiple awards and honorary titles. She received the Order of the Holy Equal-to-the-Apostles Grand Duke Vladimir I degree, the Order of the Holy Great Martyr Barbara among other awards from the Orthodox Church of Ukraine. On 18 November 1993, Naydyonova was appointed an Honored Worker of Agriculture of Ukraine by President Leonid Kravchuk "For personal contribution to the development of agricultural science, improving the efficiency of agricultural production through the introduction of advanced technologies and best practices". She received the Order of Princess Olga, Third Class from Leonid Kuchma on 19 August 1998 "For a significant personal contribution to the formation of Ukrainian statehood, merits in the socio-economic, scientific, technical and cultural development of Ukraine and on the occasion of the 7th anniversary of Ukraine's independence".

She was upgraded to Order of Princess Olga, Second Class by Kuchma on 21 August 2001 "For significant personal contribution to the socio-economic and cultural development of Ukraine, significant labor achievements and on the occasion of the 10th anniversary of Ukraine's independence". In 2002, Naydyonova was made an Honorary Academician of the Academy of Agrarian Sciences of Ukraine. On 23 November 2009, she was made a Hero of Ukraine by Yushchenko "For outstanding labor achievements, introduction into the practice of agricultural production of the latest technologies, best practices, the use of effective forms of management". Naydoyonova was also a recipient of the Badge of the Ministry of Education and Science of Ukraine "Excellence in Education". She was an Honorary Professor of Kherson State University and was a member of the university's supervisory board.
