= Rohachyk =

River in Ukraine

Location
- Country: Ukraine

Physical characteristics
- Mouth: Dnieper
  - coordinates: 47.321°N 34.0286°E
- Length: 41 km (25 mi)

Basin features
- Progression: Dnieper→ Dnieper–Bug estuary→ Black Sea

The Rohachyk river (Ukrainian: Рогачик) is a left tributary of the Dnieper river in Kherson oblast, Ukraine. It has a length of 41 km. The river valley is up to 200 m wide. The width is generally 5 m. There are several ponds on the river. It names derives from a Ukrainian word for the "horn" as the river is winding.

The Rohachyk river rises in the southern outskirts of the urban-type settlement of Verkhnii Rohachyk. It flows through the territory of Kakhovka Raion of Kherson Oblast. The mouth area of the river 7 km in length creates Nyzhniy (Lower) Rohachyk estuary which is separated from the Dnieper by Kakhovka Reservoir dam.

There are three unnamed left tributaries.

The river flows through such settlements as: Verkhnii Rohachyk, Novooleksiivka, Trudovyk, Zoria, Heorhiivka, Oleksiivka, Prolatarii.
