= Liubymivka, Kakhovka Raion, Kherson Oblast =

Rural locality in Kherson Oblast, Ukraine

Liubymivka Любимівка
- Rural settlement
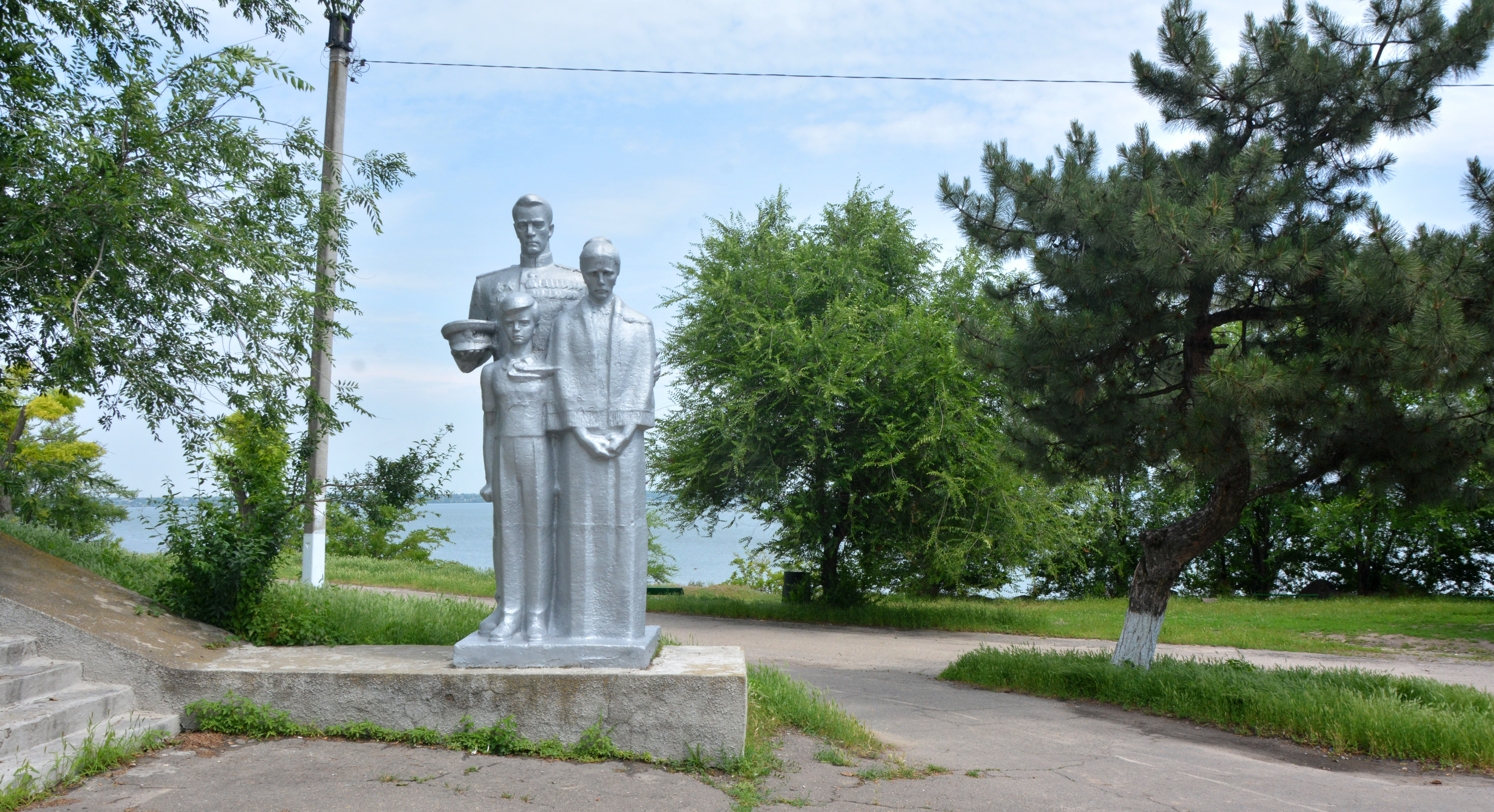

- Location in Kherson Oblast Location in Ukraine
- Country: Ukraine
- Oblast: Kherson Oblast
- Raion: Kakhovka Raion
- Hromada: Liubymivka settlement hromada

Population (2022)
  - Total: ▼5,449
- Time zone: UTC+2 (EET)
  - Summer (DST): UTC+3 (EEST)

Liubymivka (Ukrainian: Любимівка; Russian: Любимовка) is a rural settlement in Kakhovka Raion, Kherson Oblast, southern Ukraine. It is adjacent to the city of Kakhovka and is located on the left bank of the Dnieper, which is dammed there creating the Kakhovka Reservoir. Liubymivka hosts the administration of Liubymivka settlement hromada, one of the hromadas of Ukraine. It has a population of 5,449 (2022 estimate).

Until 26 January 2024, Liubymivka was designated urban-type settlement. On this day, a new law entered into force which abolished this status, and Liubymivka became a rural settlement.

== Economy ==
=== Transportation ===
Zapovitne railway station is about 5 kilometres (3.1 mi) south of the settlement. Liubymivka is on the railway connecting Mykolaiv via Snihurivka and Nova Kakhovka with Melitopol. There is infrequent passenger traffic.

The settlement has access to Highway M14 connecting Kherson with Melitopol.

== See also ==
- Russian occupation of Kherson Oblast
