= Chaplynka Raion =

Former subdivision of Kherson Oblast, Ukraine

Chaplynskyi Raion Чаплинський район
- Raion
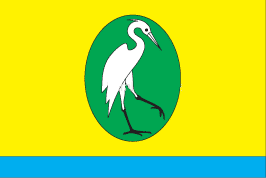
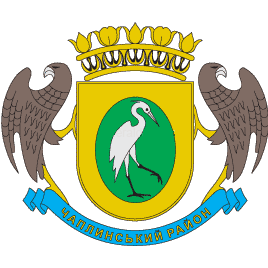
- Flag Coat of arms

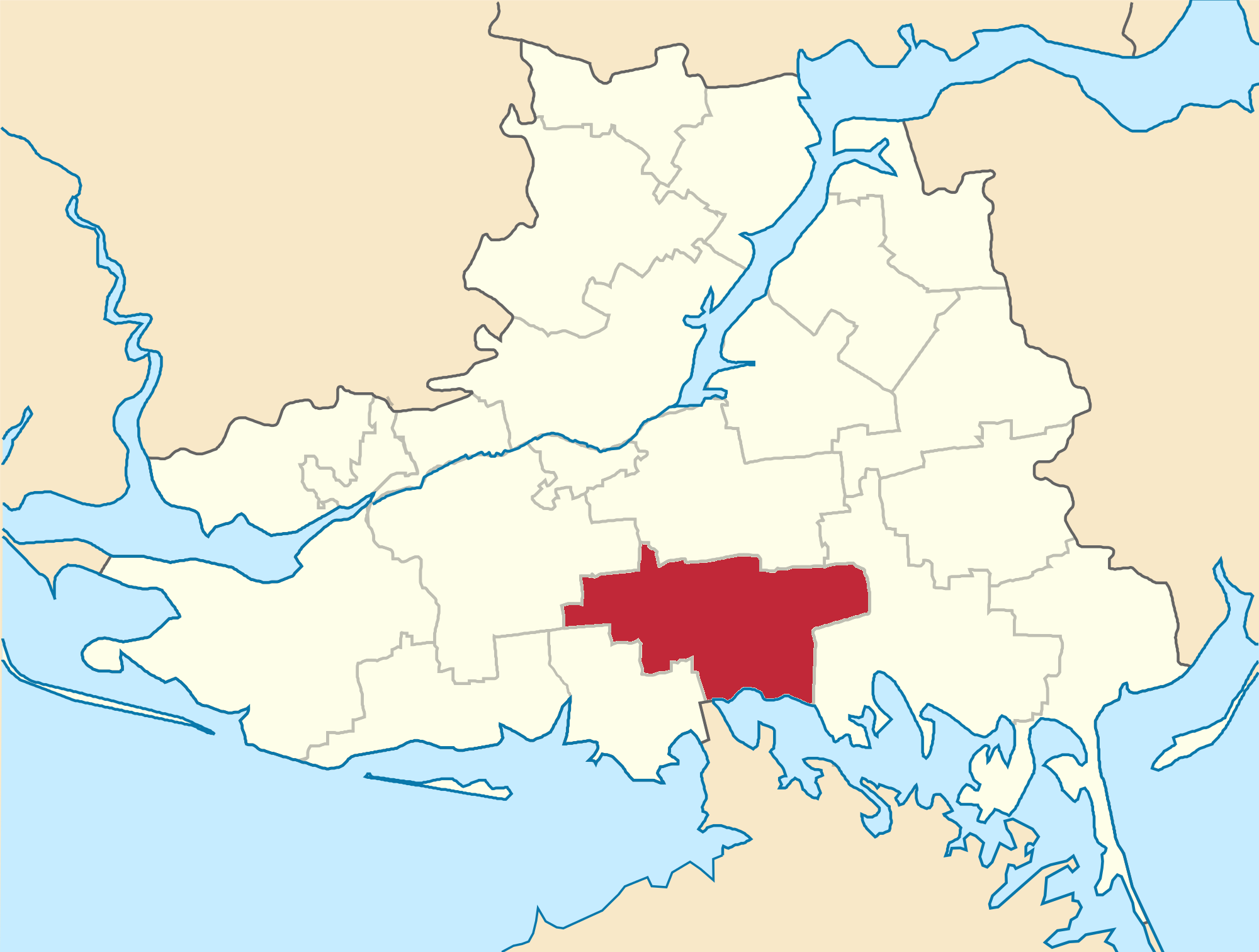
- Coordinates: 46°23′39.3468″N 33°42′32.1834″E
- Country: Ukraine
- Region: Kherson Oblast
- Established: 7 March 1923
- Disestablished: 18 July 2020
- Admin. center: Chaplynka
- Subdivisions: List: 0 — city councils; 2 — settlement councils; 18 — rural councils; Number of localities: 0 — cities; 2 — urban-type settlements; 33 — villages; 6 — rural settlements

Government
  - Governor: Volodymar Beryslavskyi

Area
  - Total: 1,700 km^{2} (660 sq mi)

Population (2020)
  - Total: 34,149 ▼
  - Density: 20/km^{2} (52/sq mi)
- Time zone: UTC+02:00 (EET)
  - Summer (DST): UTC+03:00 (EEST)
- Postal index: 75200—75244
- Area code: +380 5538

Chaplynka Raion (Ukrainian: Чаплинський район) was one of the 18 administrative raions (a district) of Kherson Oblast in southern Ukraine. Its administrative center was located in the urban-type settlement of Chaplynka. The raion was abolished on 18 July 2020 as part of the administrative reform of Ukraine, which reduced the number of raions of Kherson Oblast to five. The area of Chaplynka Raion was merged into Kakhovka Raion. The last estimate of the raion population was 34,149 (2020 est.)

At the time of disestablishment, the raion consisted of four hromadas:

- Askania-Nova settlement hromada with the administration in the urban-type settlement of Askania-Nova;
- Chaplynka settlement hromada with the administration in Chaplynka;
- Khrestivka rural hromada with the administration in the selo of Khrestivka;
- Prysyvashshia rural hromada with the administration in the selo of Hryhorivka.
