= Olimpiysky stadium =

Olimpiysky Stadium is a name of several stadiums.

- Olympic Stadium (Moscow), a stadium in Moscow
- Olimpiysky Stadium, a stadium in Kakhovka
- Olimpiyskyi National Sports Complex, a stadium in Kyiv
- RSC Olimpiyskiy (Regional Sports Complex), a stadium in Donetsk
