= Vyshneve, Kakhovka Raion =

Vyshneve Вишневе
- Village
- Location of Vyshneve Vyshneve (Ukraine)
- Coordinates: 47°14′54″N 34°27′13″E
- Country: Ukraine
- Oblast: Kherson Oblast
- Raion: Kakhovka Raion
- Hromada: Verkhnii Rohachyk settlement hromada

Area
  - Total: .954 km^{2} (0.368 sq mi)
- Elevation: 66 m (217 ft)

Population (2001)
  - Total: 140
  - Density: 139.41/km^{2} (361.1/sq mi)
- Postal code: 74405
- Area code: +380 5545

Vyshneve (Ukrainian: Вишневе) is a village in Kakhovka Raion, Kherson Oblast, Ukraine. As of 2001, the population of Vyshneve was 140 people. On February 24, 2022, Russian forces captured Vyshneve during the Russian invasion of Ukraine.

== Demographics ==
In 1989, Vyshneve had 201 people, 86 men and 115 women. By 2001, the population had dwindled to 140 people. That same year, 93.98% of the population spoke Ukrainian, 5.26% spoke Russian, and .75% spoke Moldovan. The zip code of Vyshneve is 74405.
