= Kostiantynivka, Kostiantynivka rural hromada, Kakhovka Raion, Kherson Oblast =

Village in Kakhovka Raion, Kherson Oblast, Ukraine

Kostiantynivka Костянтинівка
- Village
- Location within Kherson Oblast Location within Ukraine
- Coordinates: 46°49′41.9″N 33°52′6.8″E
- Country: Ukraine
- Oblast: Kherson Oblast
- Raion: Kakhovka Raion
- Hromada: Kostiantynivka rural hromada

Area
  - Total: 1.4 km^{2} (0.54 sq mi)

Population
  - Total: 1,455
  - Density: 1,000/km^{2} (2,700/sq mi)
- Time zone: UTC+2 (EET)
  - Summer (DST): UTC+3 (EEST)
- Postal Code: 74640

Kostiantynivka (Ukrainian: Костянтинівка) is a village in the Kakhovka Raion of Kherson Oblast, Ukraine, 28km east of Kakhovka. The village hosts the administration of Kostiantynivka rural hromada, one of the Hromadas of Ukraine.

== Geography ==
The village is situated 95km north east of the administrative centre of the Oblast, the city of Kherson, and has the Dnieper 18km to the west of the village. It has an area of 2.3km2 and a population of approximately 1,455 people.

== Administrative status ==
Until July 2020, Kostiantynivka was in the Hornostaivka Raion of Kherson Oblast. The raion was abolished in July 2020 as a result of the administrative reform of Ukraine's districts, which reduced the number of raions of Kherson Oblast to five, merging Hornostaivka Raion into Kakhovka Raion. The village is now part of Kakhovka Raion.

== Russian invasion of Ukraine ==
When Russia invaded Ukraine, almost all of Kherson Oblast was captured along with Kostiantynivka, which was captured on the second day of the war, 25 February 2022. The village was captured in Russia's southern offensive from occupied Crimea.

The western part of the Oblast, including Kherson and all settlements west of the Dnipro river, were liberated by the Ukrainian Armed Forces, on 10–11 November 2022. However, as of May 2023, the village remains occupied by Russian forces.
