= Hornostaivka, Kakhovka Raion, Kherson Oblast =

Rural locality in Kherson Oblast, Ukraine

Hornostaivka Горностаївка
- Rural settlement
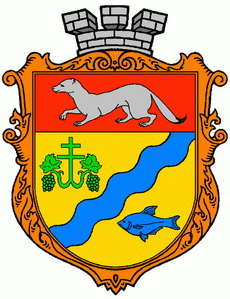
- Coat of arms

- Location within Ukraine Location within Kherson Oblast
- Coordinates: 47°00′20″N 33°43′47″E
- Country: Ukraine
- Oblast: Kherson Oblast
- Raion: Kakhovka Raion
- Hromada: Hornostaivka settlement hromada

Population (2022)
  - Total: ▼6,290
- Time zone: UTC+2 (EET)
  - Summer (DST): UTC+3 (EEST)

Hornostaivka (Ukrainian: Горностаївка, Russian: Горностаевка) is a rural settlement in Kakhovka Raion, Kherson Oblast, southern Ukraine. It is located on the left bank of the Kakhovka Reservoir, an artificial reservoir on the Dnieper. Hornostaivka hosts the administration of Hornostaivka settlement hromada, one of the hromadas of Ukraine. It has a population of 6,290 (2022 estimate). It has been under Russian occupation since 2022.

== History ==
Until 18 July 2020, Hornostaivka was the administrative center of Hornostaivka Raion. The raion was abolished in July 2020 as part of the administrative reform of Ukraine, which reduced the number of raions of Kherson Oblast to five. The area of Hornostaivka Raion was merged into Kakhovka Raion.

Until 26 January 2024, Hornostaivka was designated urban-type settlement. On this day, a new law entered into force which abolished this status, and Hornostaivka became a rural settlement.

== Demographics ==
As of the 2001 Ukrainian census, the settlement of Hornostayivka had a population of 6,999 inhabitants. The linguistic composition as of the census was as follows:

Languages in Hornostayivka
	percent
Ukrainian	93.8%
Russian	5.5%
Romanian	0.3%
Belarusian	0.1%
others	0.1%

== Economy ==
=== Transportation ===
Hornostaivka has access to a paved road which follows the left bank of the Dnieper and connects Kakhovka with Kamianka-Dniprovska. In Kakhovka, there is access to the Highway M14 connecting Kherson with Mariupol via Melitopol.

== See also ==
- Russian occupation of Kherson Oblast
