= Askania-Nova, Kherson Oblast =

Rural locality in Kherson Oblast, Ukraine

Askania-Nova Асканія-Нова
- Rural settlement
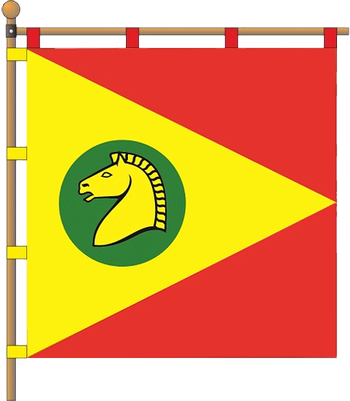
- Flag Coat of arms

- Location within Kherson Oblast Location within Ukraine
- Coordinates: 46°27′6″N 33°52′14″E
- Country: Ukraine
- Oblast: Kherson Oblast
- Raion: Kakhovka Raion
- Hromada: Askania-Nova settlement hromada
- First mentioned: 1822

Area
  - Total: 10 km^{2} (3.9 sq mi)

Population (2022)
  - Total: 2,501 ▼
  - Density: 250/km^{2} (650/sq mi)
- Postal code: 75230
- Area code: +380 5538

Askania-Nova (Ukrainian: Асканія-Нова, romanized: Askaniia-Nova), or New-Askania, is a rural settlement in Kakhovka Raion, Kherson Oblast, southern Ukraine, near the Askania-Nova biosphere reserve. It hosts the administration of the Askania-Nova settlement hromada, one of the hromadas of Ukraine. It had a population of 2,501 (2022 estimate).

== Administrative status ==
The settlement has been classified as urban since 1938. Until 18 July 2020, Askania-Nova belonged to Chaplynka Raion. The raion was abolished in July 2020 as part of the administrative reform of Ukraine, which reduced the number of raions of Kherson Oblast to five. The area of Chaplynka Raion was merged into Kakhovka Raion.

Until 26 January 2024, Askania-Nova was designated urban-type settlement. On this day, a new law entered into force which abolished this status, and Askania-Nova became a rural settlement.

== History ==
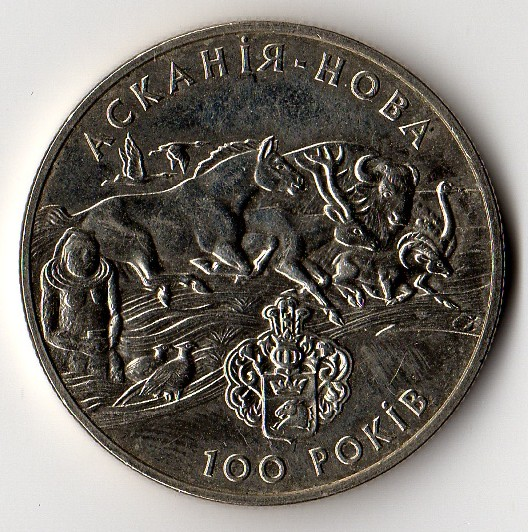
Commemorative Coin for Askania-Nova

It was established in 1822 as a rural settlement of Chapli. In 1828, the estate of Chapli was leased by Frederick Ferdinand, Duke of Anhalt-Köthen. The estate was renamed Neu-Askania, as the Duke's family held the title the Duke of Ascania since 1330. The 25 sheep breeders and German colonizers from that county founded the loosely populated settlement of Ascania-Nova.

Later, in 1835, it became a khutir of Askania-Nova. In 1856, a Ukrainian-born German entrepreneur Friedrich Fein bought the estate, which totaled approximately 52,000 ha, from the Duke of Anhalt-Dessau (presumably Leopold IV). Friedrich Fein was grandfather of Friedrich Falz-Fein, the founder of Askania Nova biosphere reserve. In 1890, it was known as the incorporated rural settlement of Askania-Nova.

== See also ==
- Russian occupation of Kherson Oblast
