= Verkhnii Rohachyk Raion =

Former subdivision of Kherson Oblast, Ukraine

Verkhnii Rohachyk Raion Верхньорогачицький район
- Raion
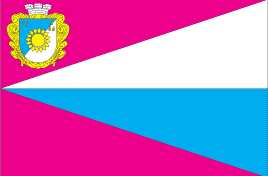
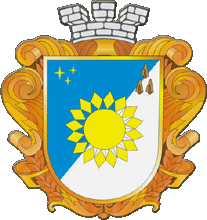
- Flag Coat of arms

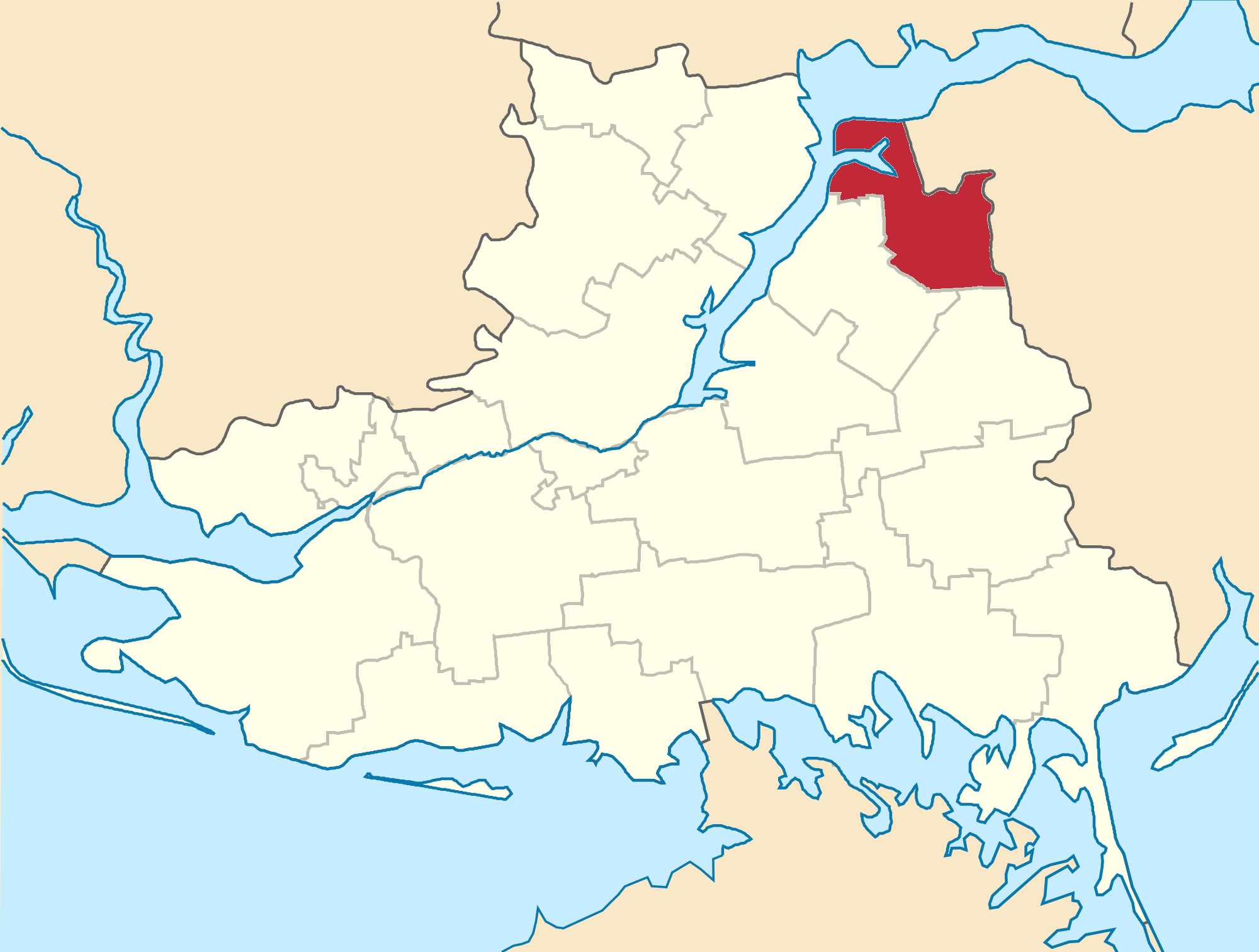
- Coordinates: 47°16′39.6654″N 34°15′14.0508″E
- Country: Ukraine
- Region: Kherson Oblast
- Established: 1944
- Disestablished: 18 July 2020
- Admin. center: Verkhnii Rohachyk
- Subdivisions: List: 0 — city councils; 1 — settlement councils; 6 — rural councils; Number of localities: 0 — cities; 1 — urban-type settlements; 20 — villages; — rural settlements

Government
  - Governor: Sergiy Gordienko

Area
  - Total: 1,000 km^{2} (390 sq mi)

Population (2020)
  - Total: 11,217 ▼
  - Density: 11/km^{2} (29/sq mi)
- Time zone: UTC+02:00 (EET)
  - Summer (DST): UTC+03:00 (EEST)
- Postal index: 74400—74441
- Area code: +380 5545

Verkhnii Rohachyk Raion (Ukrainian: Верхньорогачицький район) was one of the 18 administrative raions (a district) of Kherson Oblast in southern Ukraine. Its administrative center was located in the urban-type settlement of Verkhnii Rohachyk. The raion was abolished on 18 July 2020, as part of the administrative reform of Ukraine, which reduced the number of raions of Kherson Oblast to five. The area of Verkhnii Rohachyk Raion was merged into Kakhovka Raion. The last estimate of the raion population was 11,217 (2020 est.)

At the time of disestablishment, the raion consisted of one hromada, Verkhnii Rohachyk settlement hromada with the administration in Verkhnii Rohachyk.
