= Hornostaivka Raion =

Former subdivision of Kherson Oblast, Ukraine

Hornostaivskyi Raion Горностаївський район
- Raion
- Flag Coat of arms

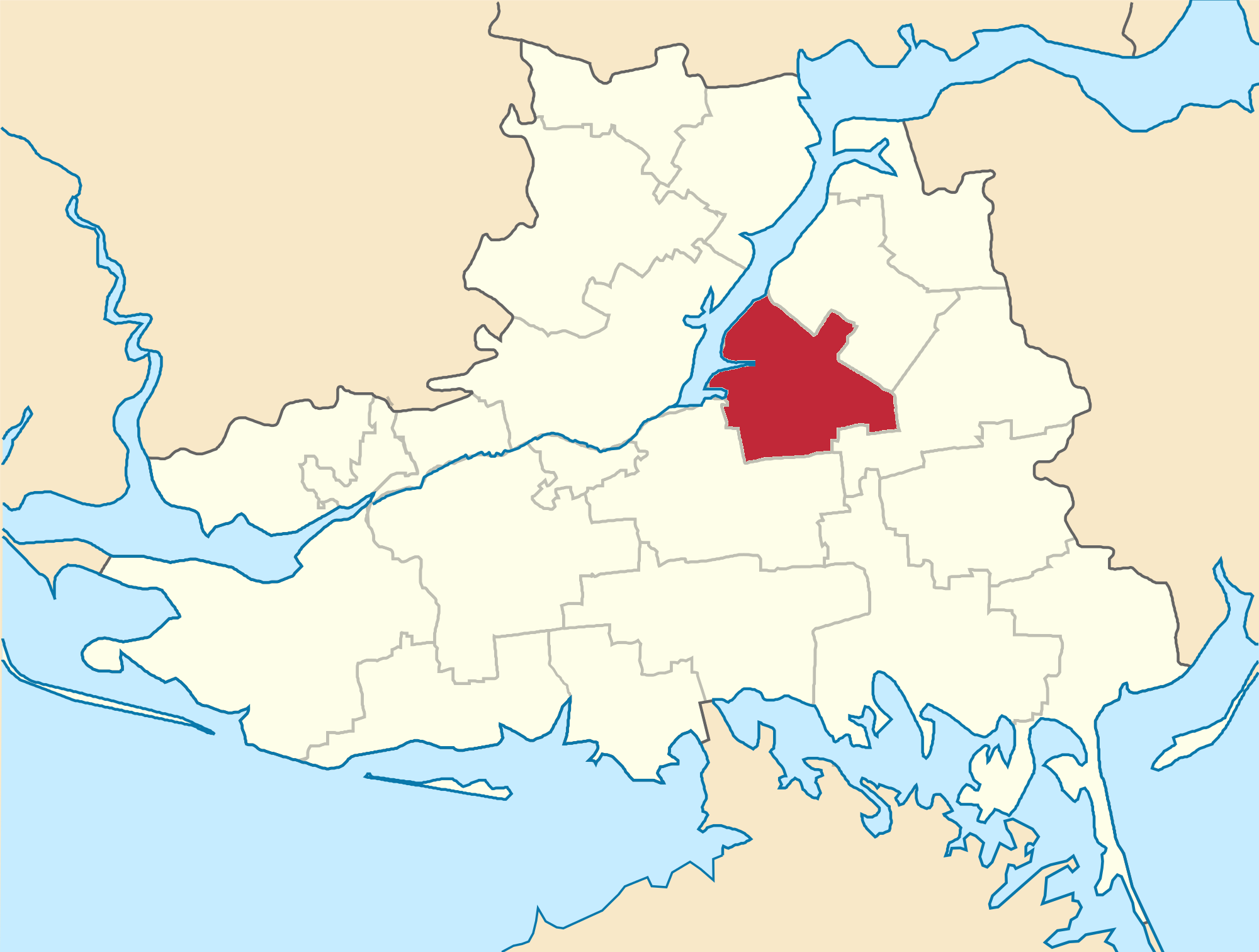
- Coordinates: 46°54′5.778″N 33°53′51.7626″E
- Country: Ukraine
- Region: Kherson Oblast
- Disestablished: 18 July 2020
- Admin. center: Hornostaivka
- Subdivisions: List: — city councils; 1 — settlement councils; 12 — rural councils; Number of localities: — cities; 1 — urban-type settlements; — villages; — rural settlements

Area
  - Total: 1,018 km^{2} (393 sq mi)

Population (2020)
  - Total: 18,993 ▼
  - Density: 18.66/km^{2} (48.32/sq mi)
- Time zone: UTC+02:00 (EET)
  - Summer (DST): UTC+03:00 (EEST)
- Postal index: 74600—74642
- Area code: +380 +380-5544

Hornostaivka Raion (Ukrainian: Горностаївський район) was one of the 18 administrative raions (a district) of Kherson Oblast in southern Ukraine. Its administrative center was located in the urban-type settlement of Hornostaivka. The raion was abolished on 18 July 2020 as part of the administrative reform of Ukraine, which reduced the number of raions of Kherson Oblast to five. The area of Hornostaivka Raion was merged into Kakhovka Raion. The last estimate of the raion population was 18,993 (2020 est.)

At the time of disestablishment, the raion consisted of two hromadas:

- Hornostaivka settlement hromada with the administration in Hornostaivka;
- Kostiantynivka rural hromada with the administration in the selo of Kostiantynivka.
