= Olia Hercules =

Ukrainian chef and food writer

Olia Hercules (Ukrainian: Оля Геркулес: born 1984) is a London-based Ukrainian chef, food writer and food stylist. In response to the 2022 Russian invasion of Ukraine she initiated a programme of fundraising, for individuals and for UNICEF.

== Early life ==
Olia Hercules was born in Kakhovka, in the South of Ukraine. She moved to Cyprus at the age of 12 where the climate was deemed better for her asthma and went to an English school. She settled in the United Kingdom at the age of 18 to study international relations and Italian at Warwick University before obtaining a master's degree.

== Work ==
Hercules began working as a film journalist but amidst the 2008 economic crisis decided to change careers. Olia trained at Leith's School of Food and Wine, then worked as a food stylist for various publications, after which she went on to work at London restaurant Ottolenghi's as a chef-de-partie (line cook).

Hercules has appeared on Saturday Kitchen, Sunday Brunch, and Christopher Kimball's Milk Street Television.

== Books ==
She has written four cookbooks, including Mamushka which is a collection of Eastern European recipes.

- Mamushka: Recipes From Ukraine & Beyond (Octopus Publishing, 2015)
- Kaukasis: The Cookbook – A Journey Through the Wild East (Octopus Publishing, 2017)
- Summer Kitchens Inside Ukraine's Hidden Places of Cooking and Sanctuary (Weldon Owen, July 14, 2020)
- Home Food (Bloomsbury Publishing, 7 July 2022)
- Strong Roots (Bloomsbury Publishing, 19 June 2025)

== Activism ==
In response to the 2022 Russian invasion of Ukraine, Hercules raised money to privately send bullet-proof vests to civilian volunteers in the Ukrainian army, including her brother. With her friend, Alissa Timoshkina, the duo established the #CookForUkraine social media initiative, encouraging businesses and individuals to raise money for UNICEF and Legacy of War Foundation by cooking Ukrainian cuisine. The project has raised over £2 million for UNICEF, Choose Love and the Legacy of War Foundation. In 2023, Olia and Alissa set up Ukraine Hub to provide free workshops for displaced Ukrainians in the UK.

== Awards ==
- The Observer Rising Star in Food 2015
- Winner of Fortnum & Mason's Debut Food Book Award 2016
- Champions of Change for #CookForUkraine
- Observer Food Monthly Editor's Award 2022 for #CookForUkraine
- The Guild of Food Writer's Special Award 2023 for #CookForUkraine

== Personal life ==
Olia is married to British food photographer, Joe Woodhouse. They live in London with their two sons.
