= Tavrychanka =

Village in Kherson Oblast, Ukraine

Tavrychanka Тавричанка
- Village
- Location within Kherson Oblast Location within Ukraine
- Coordinates: 46°33′10.9″N 33°49′15.8″E
- Country: Ukraine
- Oblast: Kherson
- Raion: Kakhovka Raion
- Hromada: Tavrychanka Rural Hromada
- Established: 1859

Area
  - Total: 1.82 km^{2} (0.70 sq mi)

Population
  - Total: 1,703
  - Density: 936/km^{2} (2,420/sq mi)
- Time zone: UTC+2 (EET)
  - Summer (DST): UTC+3 (EEST)
- Postal Code: 74821
- Area code: +380 553691

Tavrychanka (Ukrainian: Тавричанка) is a village in Kakhovka Raion, Kherson Oblast, Ukraine. The village hosts the administration of the Tavrychanka rural hromada, one of the hromadas of Ukraine.

The Ukrainian industrialist Vira Naydyonova is buried in the St. Basil the Great Church, in the village.

== Geography ==
The village is situated 91 km south east of the administrative centre of the Oblast, Kherson, and 41 km south-east of the administrative centre of the raion, Nova Kakhovka. It has an area of 1.82 km2 and a population of approximately 1,703 people.

== Russian invasion and occupation ==
When Russia invaded Ukraine, most of Kherson Oblast, along with the village of Tavrychanka, were captured on the first day of the war, 24 February 2022. On 10 and 11 November 2022, all settlements west of the Dnieper, including the city of Kherson, were liberated by the Ukrainian Armed Forces. However, as of February 2023, the village remains occupied by Russian forces.
