= Chaplynka =

Rural locality in Kherson Oblast, Ukraine

Chaplynka Чаплинка
- Rural settlement
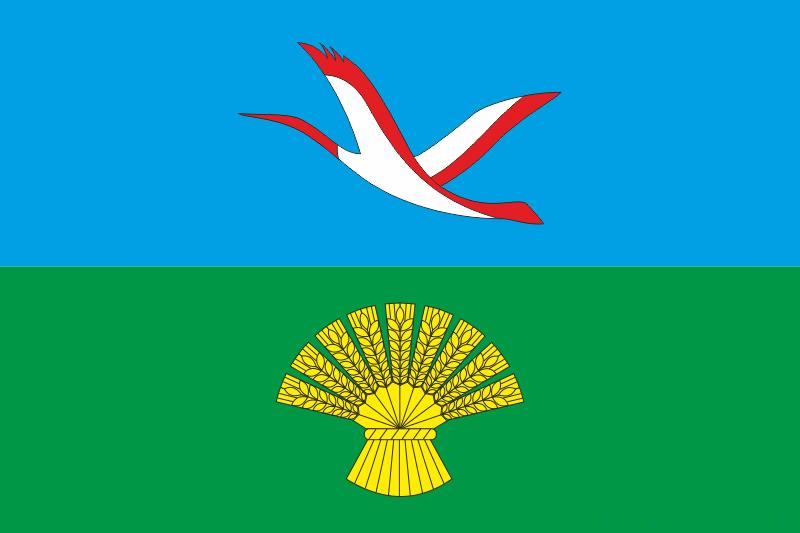
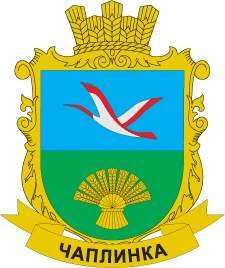
- Flag Coat of arms

- Location within Kherson Oblast Location within Ukraine
- Coordinates: 46°21′52″N 33°31′59″E
- Country: Ukraine
- Oblast: Kherson Oblast
- Raion: Kakhovka Raion
- Hromada: Chaplynka settlement hromada

Area
  - Total: 13 km^{2} (5.0 sq mi)

Population (2022)
  - Total: ▼9,415
- Postal code: 75200
- Area code: +380-5538

Chaplynka (Ukrainian: Чаплинка) is a rural settlement in Kakhovka Raion, Kherson Oblast, southern Ukraine. It hosts the administration of the Chaplynka settlement hromada, one of the hromadas of Ukraine. It had a population of 9,415 (2022 estimate). In early 2022, it came under Russian occupation as a result of the Russian invasion of Ukraine.

== History ==
Until 18 July 2020, Chaplynka was the administrative center of Chaplynka Raion. The raion was abolished in July 2020 as part of the administrative reform of Ukraine, which reduced the number of raions of Kherson Oblast to five. The area of Chaplynka Raion was merged into Kakhovka Raion.

=== Russo-Ukrainian war ===
Since 24 February 2022, the settlement has been occupied by Russian forces as a result of the Russo-Ukrainian War.

In March 2022, a peaceful protest against the Russian occupiers was dispersed by Russian soldiers who shot at the civilians. Two were reported to be injured.

To the south of the town is Chaplynka airfield (46°20′47″N 33°32′31″E) which, from August 2022, was being used as a Russian airbase against Ukraine. After the Ukrainian Armed Forces recaptured Kherson in November 2022, Chaplynka fell within range of HIMARS strikes, causing Russian aviation to relocate to Berdiansk Airport.

In February 2023, Ukrainian sources reported that Russian forces had imposed a round-the-clock curfew for two days and were evicting residents without proper documentation of home ownership.

In November 2023, Russian appointed governor Vladimir Saldo reported that Ukrainian forces had killed at least nine people and wounded nine others in strikes on an employment center in Chaplynka. Ukrainian forces destroyed a Russian Pantsir system in the middle of a field near the village.

Until 26 January 2024, Chaplynka was designated an urban-type settlement. On this day, a new law entered into force which abolished this status, and Chaplynka became a rural settlement.

== Demographics ==
As of the 2001 Ukrainian census, Chaplynka had a population of 10,543 inhabitants. The native language composition was as follows:

First languages in Chaplynka
	percent
Ukrainian	92.5%
Russian	5.9%
Armenian	0.5%
Romani	0.2%
Belarusian	0.1%
Moldovan	0.1%
others	0.5%

== Notable people ==
- Serhiy Biloushchenko, a Ukrainian rower.
- Mykola Kulish, a Ukrainian prose writer, playwright, pedagogue, veteran of World War I, and Red Army veteran.
