= Khrestivka, Kherson Oblast =

Village in Kherson Oblast, Ukraine

Khrestivka Хрестівка
- Village
- Location within Kherson Oblast Location within Ukraine
- Coordinates: 46°24′03.1″N 33°43′07.4″E
- Country: Ukraine
- Oblast: Kherson Oblast
- Raion: Kakhovka Raion
- Hromada: Khrestivka Rural Hromada

Area
  - Total: 1.4 km^{2} (0.54 sq mi)

Population
  - Total: 1,694
  - Density: 1,200/km^{2} (3,100/sq mi)
- Time zone: UTC+2 (EET)
  - Summer (DST): UTC+3 (EEST)
- Postal Code: 75225

Khrestivka (Ukrainian: Хрестівка) is a village in the Kakhovka Raion of Kherson Oblast, Ukraine, 20km north of the border with the Crimean peninsula. The village hosts the administration of the Khrestivka rural Hromada, one of the Hromadas of Ukraine.

== Geography ==
The village is situated 88km south east of the administrative centre of the Oblast, the city of Kherson, and 29km north east of the Black Sea coast. It has an area of 1.4km2 and a population of approximately 1,694 people.

== Administrative status ==
Until July 2020, Khrestivka was in the Chaplynka Raion of Kherson Oblast. The raion was abolished in July 2020 as a result of the administrative reform of Ukraine's districts, which reduced the number of raions of Kherson Oblast to five, merging Chaplynka Raion into Kakhovka Raion. The village is now part of Kakhovka Raion.

== Russian invasion and occupation ==
When Russia invaded Ukraine, almost all of Kherson Oblast was captured along with Khrestivka, which was captured on the first day of the war, 24 February 2022. The village was captured in Russia's southern offensive from occupied Crimea.

The western part of the Oblast, including Kherson and all settlements west of the Dnipro river, were liberated by the Ukrainian Armed Forces, on 10 November and 11 November 2022. However, as of May 2023, the village remains occupied by Russian forces.

== Demographics ==
As of the 2001 Ukrainian census, the settlement had a population of 1,694 people. The linguistic makeup of the population was as follows:

Native languages in Khrestivka
	percent
Ukrainian	72.0%
Russian	6.7%
Romanian	0.2%
Belarusian	0.1%
others	21.0%
