= Rubanivka, Kherson Oblast =

Village in Kherson Oblast, Ukraine

Rubanivka Рубанівка
- Village
- Location within Kherson Oblast Location within Ukraine
- Coordinates: 46°59′51.5″N 34°10′00.5″E
- Country: Ukraine
- Oblast: Kherson Oblast
- Raion: Kakhovka Raion
- Hromada: Rubanivka Rural Hromada

Area
  - Total: 17 km^{2} (6.6 sq mi)

Population
  - Total: 3,927
  - Density: 230/km^{2} (600/sq mi)
- Time zone: UTC+2 (EET)
  - Summer (DST): UTC+3 (EEST)
- Postal Code: 74531

Rubanivka (Ukrainian: Рубанівка) is a village located in Kakhovka Raion, Kherson Oblast, Ukraine, 29 km west of the border with Zaporizhzhia Oblast. It hosts the administration of the Rubanivka rural hromada, one of the Hromadas of Ukraine.

== Geography ==
The village is situated 120 km north east of the administrative centre of the Oblast, the city of Kherson, and 25 km south east of the banks of the Dnieper. It has an area of 17km2 and a population of approximately 3,927 people.

== Administrative status ==
Until July 2020, Rubanivka was in the Velyka Lepetykha Raion of Kherson Oblast. The raion was abolished in July 2020 as a result of the administrative reform of Ukraine's districts, which reduced the number of raions of Kherson Oblast to five, merging Velyka Lepetykha Raion into Kakhovka Raion.

== Russian invasion and occupation ==
When Russia invaded Ukraine, almost all of Kherson Oblast was captured along with Rubanivka, which was captured on the second day of the war, 25 February 2022. The western part of the Oblast, including Kherson and all settlements west of the Dnipro river, were liberated by the Ukrainian Armed Forces, on 10 November and 11 November 2022. However, as of June 2025, the village remains occupied by Russian forces.
