= Velyka Lepetykha Raion =

Former subdivision of Kherson Oblast, Ukraine

Velykolepetyskyi Raion Великолепетиський район
- Raion
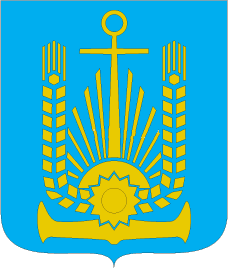
- Flag Coat of arms

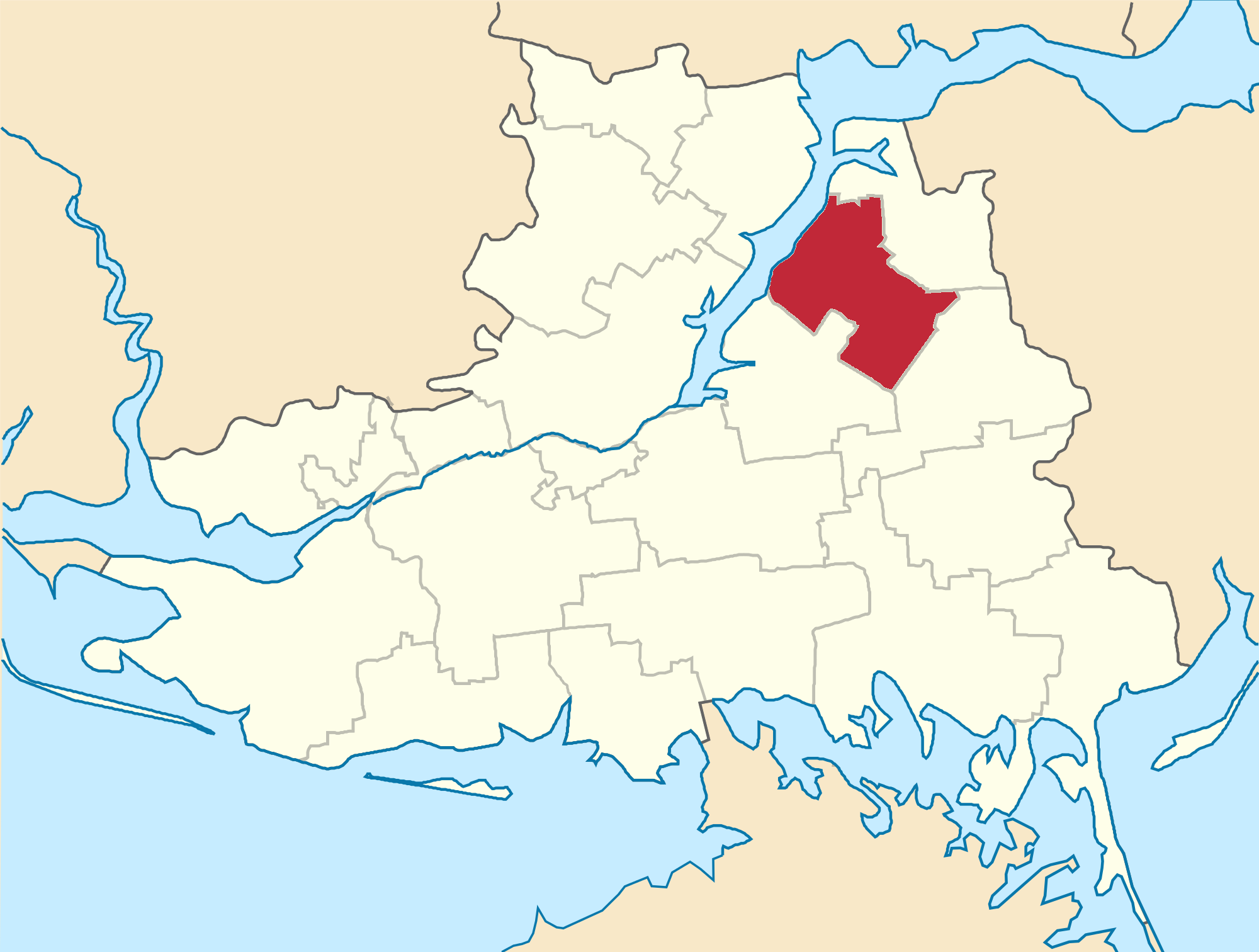
- Coordinates: 47°06′35″N 34°06′10″E
- Country: Ukraine
- Region: Kherson Oblast
- Established: 1923
- Disestablished: 18 July 2020
- De-facto reestablishment: 8 July 2022
- Admin. center: Velyka Lepetykha
- Subdivisions: List: 0 — urban hromada; 1 — settlement hromadas; 6 — rural hromadas; Number of localities: 0 — cities; 1 — settlements; 12 — villages; — rural settlements

Government
  - Governor: Olga Baranovskaya (de-facto)

Area
  - Total: 1,140 km^{2} (440 sq mi)

Population (2020)
  - Total: 15,961 ▼
  - Density: 14.0/km^{2} (36.3/sq mi)
- Time zone: UTC+02:00 (EET)
  - Summer (DST): UTC+03:00 (EEST)
- Postal index: 74500—74532
- Area code: +380 5543
- Website: http://lepetykha-rda.gov.ua (Ukrainian-administered, defunct) https://velikolepetixskij-r74.gosweb.gosuslugi.ru/ (Russian-administered)

Velyka Lepetykha Raion (Ukrainian: Великолепетиський район) was one of the 18 administrative raions (a district) of Kherson Oblast in southern Ukraine. Its administrative center was located in the urban-type settlement of Velyka Lepetykha. The raion was abolished on 18 July 2020 as part of the administrative reform of Ukraine, which reduced the number of raions of Kherson Oblast to five. The area of Velyka Lepetykha Raion was merged into Kakhovka Raion. The last estimate of the raion population was 15,961 (2020 est.)

At the time of disestablishment, the raion consisted of two hromadas:

- Rubanivka rural hromada with the administration in the selo of Rubanivka;
- Velyka Lepetykha settlement hromada with the administration in Velyka Lepetykha.

During the Russian occupation of Kherson Oblast, a decree in July 8, 2022 restored the Raion as the "Velikolepetikhsky District" with Olga Baranovskaya as its first governor.
