= Zelenyi Pid =

Village in Kakhovka Raion, Kherson Oblast, Ukraine

Zelenyi Pid Зелений Під
- Village
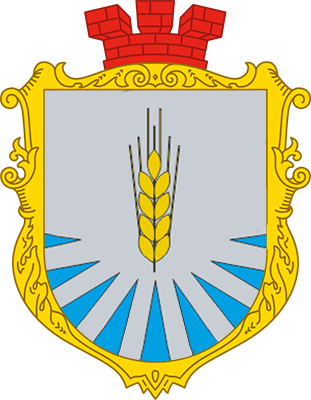
- Coat of arms

- Location within Kherson Oblast Location within Ukraine
- Coordinates: 46°40′46.3″N 33°46′57.8″E
- Country: Ukraine
- Oblast: Kherson Oblast
- Raion: Kakhovka Raion
- Hromada: Zelenyi Pid Rural Hromada

Area
  - Total: 1.22 km^{2} (0.47 sq mi)

Population
  - Total: 922
  - Density: 756/km^{2} (1,960/sq mi)
- Time zone: UTC+2 (EET)
  - Summer (DST): UTC+3 (EEST)
- Postal Code: 74853

Zelenyi Pid (Ukrainian: Зелений Під) is a village in Kakhovka Raion, Kherson Oblast, Ukraine. The village hosts the administration of the Zelenyi Pid rural hromada, one of the hromadas of Ukraine.

== Geography ==
The village is situated 90 km (56 mi) east of the administrative centre of the Oblast, Kherson, and 32 km (20 mi) south-east of the administrative centre of the raion, Nova Kakhovka. It has an area of 1.2 km^{2} (0.46 sq mi) and a population of approximately 922 people.

== Russian invasion and occupation ==
When Russian invasion of Ukraine, most of Kherson Oblast, along with the village of Zelenyi Pid, were captured on the first day of the war, 24 February 2022. On 10 and 11 November 2022, all settlements west of the Dnieper, including the city of Kherson, were liberated by the Ukrainian Armed Forces. However, as of February 2023, the village remains occupied by Russian forces.
