= Lake Lemuria =

Tinted lake in Ukraine

Lemuria
- Лемурійське озеро (Ukrainian)
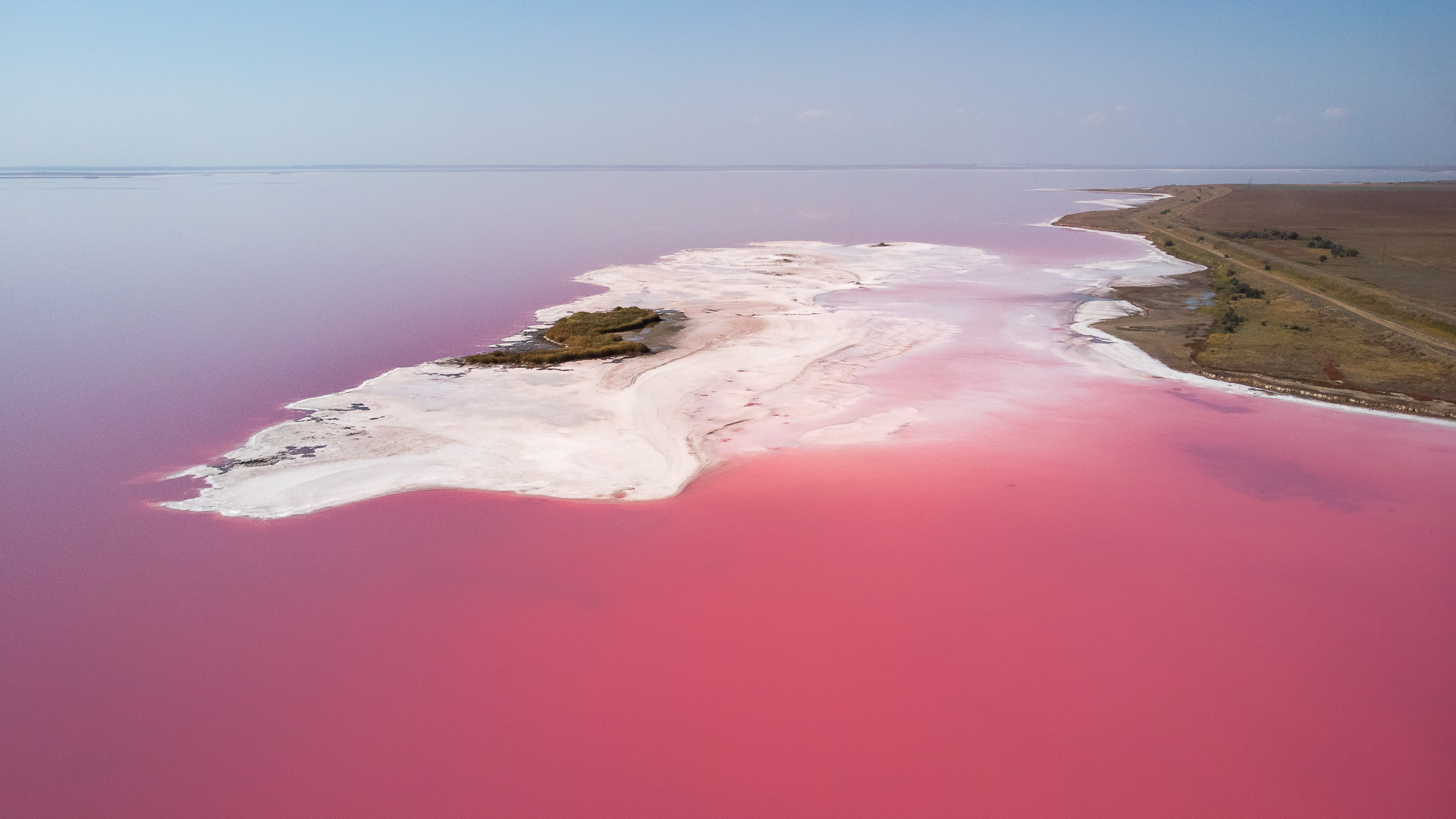
- Lake Lemuria from above

- Location within Kherson Oblast Location within Ukraine Location within Europe
- Interactive map of Lemuria
- Location: Kherson Oblast
- Coordinates: 46°14′29″N 33°44′10″E
- Type: lake
- Basin countries: Ukraine

Lake Lemuria (Ukrainian: Лемурійське озеро, romanized: Lemuriiske ozero), also known as Pink Lake, is a small lake in the western part of Syvash Bay in the Kherson Oblast (region) of Ukraine. Located near the villages of Hryhorivka and Novovolodymyrivka, Lemuria lake has pink water due to algae which produce large amounts of beta-carotene. Lake Lemuria is a healing resort of international importance.

The salinity of the lake water reaches 270–300 grams of salt per liter of water.

== History ==
The origins of the lake are disputed. According to one theory, on 26 August 1969, a Soviet bomber crashed on the shores of Syvash. Rescuers allegedly breached salty aquifers while digging to a depth of 18 metres (59 ft) to collect the remains of the bomber. The lake was later formed when underground water filled the excavation. Residents of the surrounding villages named the lake "Yama" and often went for a swim for fun. After some time, stories about the healing properties of the salt water of the lake began to spread. This allowed starting the development of green tourism in this region. Supporters of Helena Blavatsky's esoteric ideas named the lake, as a reference to the mythical continent Lemuria.

== Color ==
The pink colour of the reservoir is due to unicellular algae Dunaliella saline, which contain beta-carotene to protect it from long-term UV radiation. The hotter the summer, the more water evaporates from the lake and the brine gets a more saturated colour. While retreating, the water leaves a large amount of salt crystals on the shore. In places, salt crystals get lost, forming "stalagmites". The white shore and the pink lake give this part of Kherson region a very distinctive appearance.

== Application ==
Mud from Lake Lemuria and Syvash Bay is marketed as a naturopathic remedy for its purported cosmetic and therapeutic benefits.
