= Hryhorivka, Kherson Oblast =

Village in Kherson Oblast, Ukraine

Hryhorivka Григорівка
- Village
- Location within Kherson Oblast Location within Ukraine
- Coordinates: 46.2925°N 33.735°E
- Country: Ukraine
- Oblast: Kherson Oblast
- Raion: Kakhovka Raion
- Hromada: Prysyvashshia rural hromada

Area
  - Total: 4.3 km^{2} (1.7 sq mi)

Population
  - Total: 1,814
  - Density: 420/km^{2} (1,100/sq mi)
- Time zone: UTC+2 (EET)
  - Summer (DST): UTC+3 (EEST)
- Postal Code: 75240

Hryhorivka (Ukrainian: Григорівка), is a village in southern Ukraine, which is located in Kakhovka Raion of Kherson Oblast and hosts the administration of the Prysyvashshia rural hromada, one of the Hromadas of Ukraine.

The village is near Lake Lemuria, a lake in Ukraine well-known for its pink color, which comes from beta-carotene-producing algae.

It has an area of 4.3 km2 and a population of approximately 1,814 people.

== Languages spoken ==
Ukrainian: 87.05%

Russian: 5.68%

Others: 7.27%

== History ==
The area that would become Hryhorivka became part of the Russian Empire after Russia annexed the Crimean Khanate in 1783. The village was founded in 1869, and became part of the short-lived Ukrainian People's Republic during the Russian Civil War. The village suffered through Holodomor from 1932-1933, where 9 residents from this small village alone died from starvation.

It was occupied by Nazi Germany during the Second World War, but was liberated by the Red Army during the Battle of the Dnieper.

Hryhorivka was captured by Russian ground forces on the first day of the Russian Invasion of Ukraine phase of the Russo-Ukrainian War when they crossed the nearby border of Russia-occupied Crimea. The settlement is still currently under occupation as of May 2024.
