= Verkhnii Rohachyk =

Rural locality in Kherson Oblast, Ukraine

Verkhnii Rohachyk Верхній Рогачик
- Rural settlement
- Location within Kherson Oblast Location within Ukraine
- Coordinates: 47°15′10″N 34°20′10″E
- Country: Ukraine
- Oblast: Kherson Oblast
- Raion: Kakhovka Raion
- Hromada: Verkhnii Rohachyk settlement hromada

Population (2022)
  - Total: ▼5,117
- Time zone: UTC+2 (EET)
  - Summer (DST): UTC+3 (EEST)

Verkhnii Rohachyk (Ukrainian: Ве́рхній Рога́чик, pronounced [ˈwɛrxn⁽ʲ⁾ij roˈɦɑtʃɪk]; Russian: Верхний Рогачик) is a rural settlement in Kakhovka Raion, Kherson Oblast, southern Ukraine. It hosts the administration of Verkhnii Rohachyk settlement hromada, one of the hromadas of Ukraine. The settlement is located on the banks of the Rohachyk River, a left tributary of the Dnieper. It has a population of 5,117 (2022 estimate).

== History ==
Until 18 July 2020, Verkhnii Rohachyk was the administrative center of Verkhnii Rohachyk Raion. The raion was abolished in July 2020 as part of the administrative reform of Ukraine, which reduced the number of raions of Kherson Oblast to five. The area of Verkhnii Rohachyk Raion was merged into Kakhovka Raion.

Until 26 January 2024, Verkhnii Rohachyk was designated urban-type settlement. On this day, a new law entered into force which abolished this status, and Verkhnii Rohachyk became a rural settlement.

== Economy ==
=== Transportation ===
Verkhnii Rohachyk is connected by roads to Nyzhni Sirohozy and Kamianka-Dniprovska, with further access to Zaporizhzhia, Kherson, and Henichesk.

== See also ==
- Russian occupation of Kherson Oblast
