= Kakhovka Raion =

Subdivision of Kherson Oblast, Ukraine

Kakhovka Raion Каховський район
- Raion
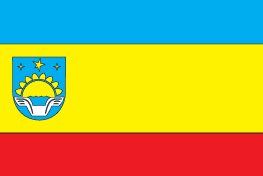
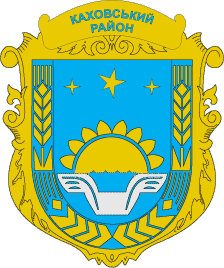
- Flag Coat of arms
- Interactive map of Kakhovka Raion
- Coordinates: 46°40′27.5736″N 33°40′36.9582″E
- Country: Ukraine
- Oblast: Kherson Oblast
- Established: 1923
- Admin. center: Nova Kakhovka
- Subdivisions: 15 hromadas

Government
  - Governor: Volodymyr Storchak

Area
  - Total: 6,395.8 km^{2} (2,469.4 sq mi)

Population (2022)
  - Total: 216,458
  - Density: 33.844/km^{2} (87.655/sq mi)
- Time zone: UTC+02:00 (EET)
  - Summer (DST): UTC+03:00 (EEST)
- Postal index: 74820—74863
- Area code: +380 5536
- Website: http://kakhovka-rda.gov.ua

Kakhovka Raion (Ukrainian: Каховський район) is one of the administrative raions (a district) of Kherson Oblast in southern Ukraine. Its administrative center is located in the city of Nova Kakhovka. Population: 216,458 (2022 estimate).

On 18 July 2020, as part of the administrative reform of Ukraine, the number of raions of Kherson Oblast was reduced to five, and the area of Kakhovka Raion was significantly expanded. Four abolished raions, Chaplynka, Hornostaivka, Velyka Lepetykha, and Verkhnii Rohachyk Raions, as well as Nova Kakhovka Municipality and the city of Kakhovka which was previously incorporated as a city of oblast significance and did not belong to the raion, were merged into Kakhovka Raion. Kakhovka served as the raion center before 2020, but after the reform, the center was moved to Nova Kakhovka. The January 2020 estimate of the raion population was 34,521 (2020 est.).

Also the reform made changes to local subdivisions and territorial councils (rada) were replaced with territorial communities (hromada) which also were increased combining several adjacent territorial councils. In this way, instead of one settlement council and 18 village councils, Kakhovka Raion was re-subdivided into three urban hromadas, six settlement hromadas and six rural hromadas.

== Subdivisions ==
=== Current ===
After the reform in July 2020, the raion consisted of 15 hromadas:

- Askania-Nova settlement hromada with the administration in the rural settlement of Askania-Nova, transferred from Chaplynka Raion;
- Chaplynka settlement hromada with the administration in the rural settlement of Chaplynka, transferred from Chaplynka Raion;
- Hornostaivka settlement hromada with the administration in rural settlement of Hornostaivka, transferred from Hornostaivka Raion;
- Kakhovka urban hromada with the administration in the city of Kakhovka, transferred from the city of oblast significance of Kakhovka;
- Khrestivka rural hromada with the administration in the selo of Khrestivka, transferred from Chaplynka Raion;
- Kostiantynivka rural hromada with the administration in the selo of Kostiantynivka, transferred from Hornostaivka Raion;
- Liubymivka settlement hromada with the administration in the rural settlement of Liubymivka, retained from Kakhovka Raion;
- Nova Kakhovka urban hromada with the administration in the city of Nova Kakhovka, transferred from Nova Kakhovka Municipality;
- Prysyvashshia rural hromada with the administration in the selo of Hryhorivka, transferred from Chaplynka Raion;
- Rubanivka rural hromada with the administration in the selo of Rubanivka, transferred from Velyka Lepetykha Raion;
- Tavriisk urban hromada with the administration in the city of Tavriisk, retained from Kakhovka Raion and transferred from Nova Kakhovka Municipality;
- Tavrychanka rural hromada with the administration in the selo of Tavrychanka, retained from Kakhovka Raion;
- Velyka Lepetykha settlement hromada with the administration in the rural settlement of Velyka Lepetykha, transferred from Velyka Lepetykha Raion;
- Verkhnii Rohachyk settlement hromada with the administration in the rural settlement of Verkhnii Rohachyk, transferred from Verkhnii Rohachyk Raion;
- Zelenyi Pid rural hromada with the administration in the settlement of Zelenyi Pid, retained from Kakhovka Raion.

=== Before 2020 ===
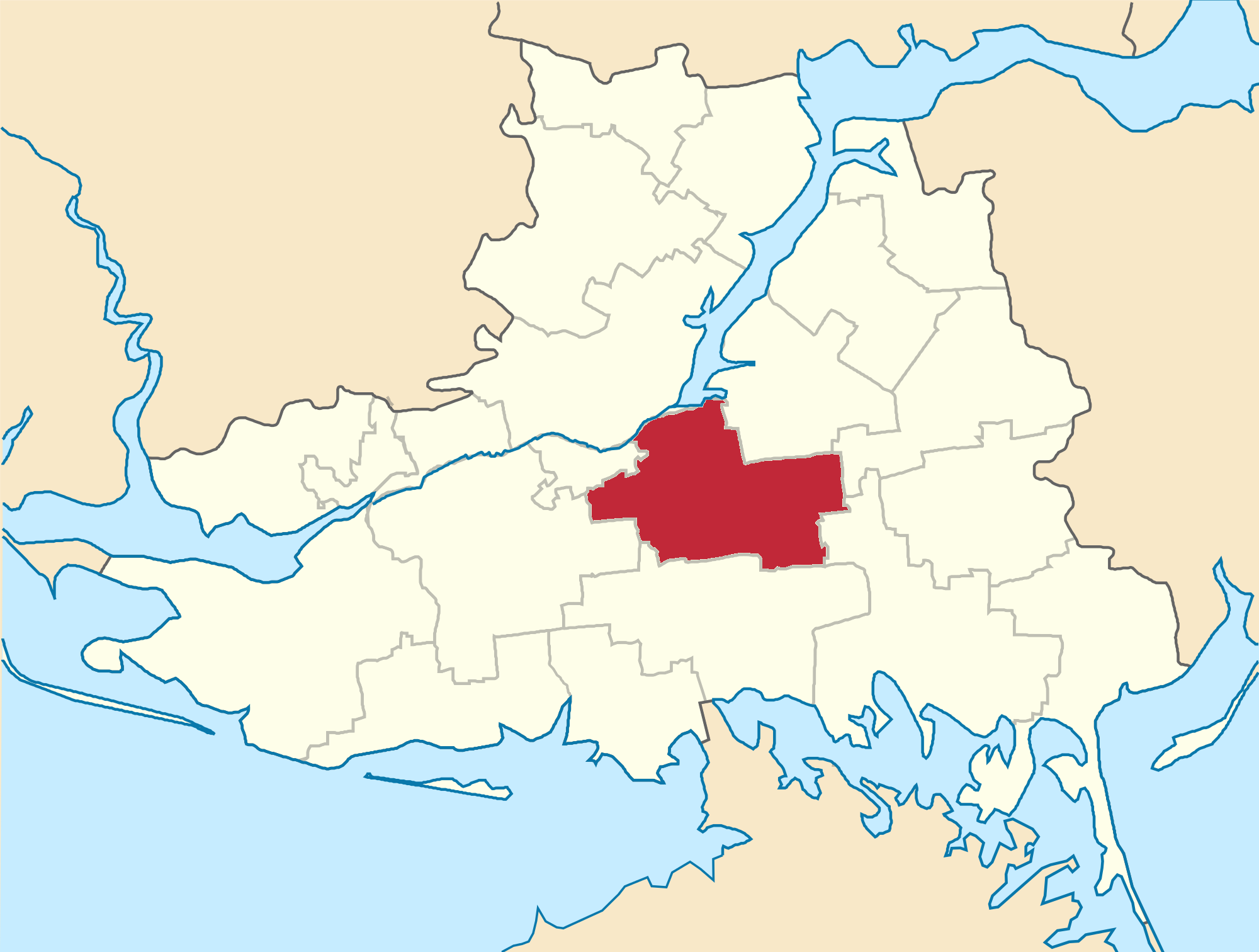
Kakhovka Raion in Kherson Oblast before 2020

Before the 2020 reform, the raion consisted of four hromadas:

- Liubymivka settlement hromada with the administration in Liubymivka;
- Tavrychanka rural hromada with the administration in Tavrychanka;
- Tavriisk urban hromada with the administration in Tavriisk, shared with Nova Kakhovka Municipality;
- Zelenyi Pid rural hromada with the administration in Zelenyi Pid.
