= Kakhovka =

Town in Kherson Oblast, Ukraine

Kakhovka Каховка
- City
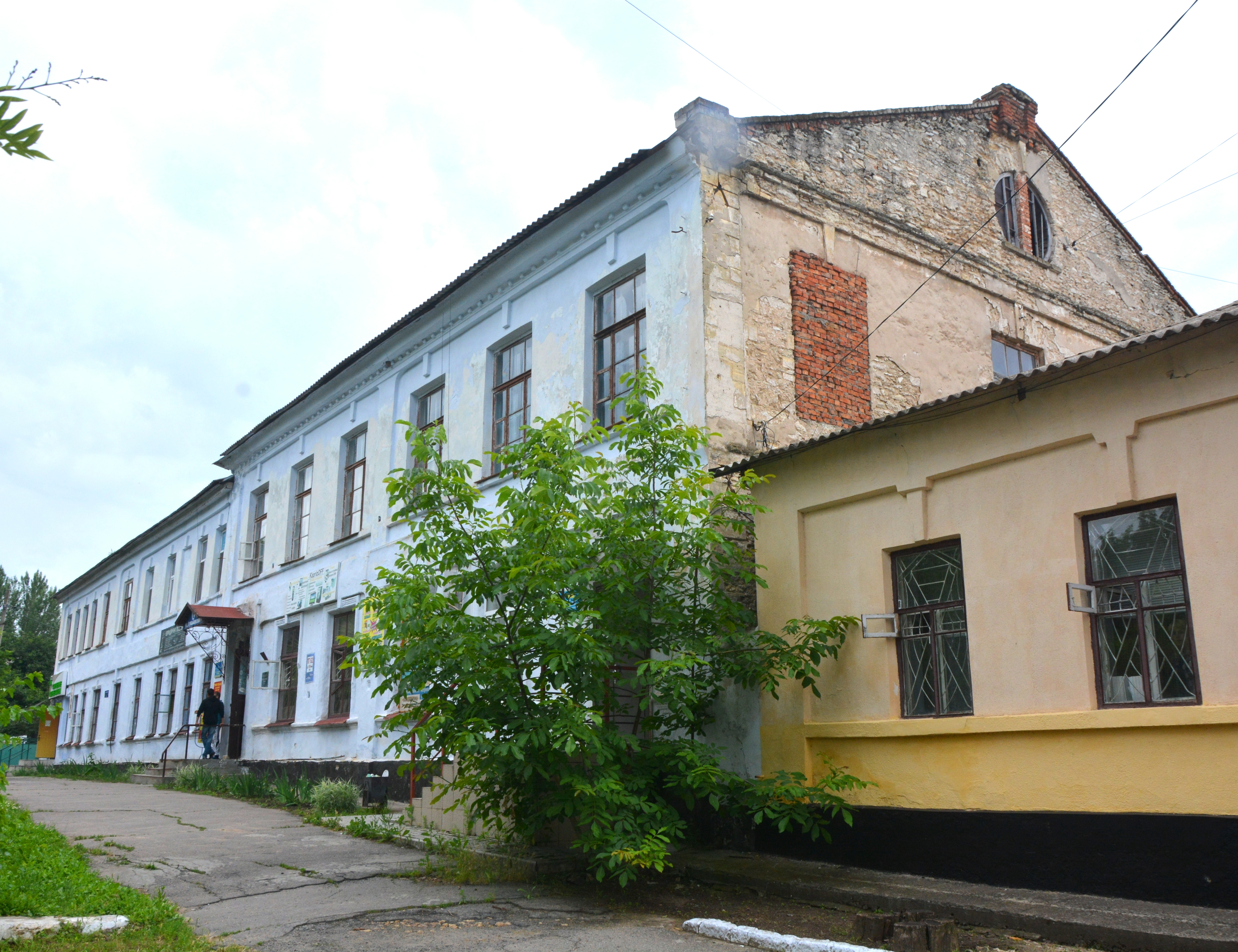
- Former girls' gymnasium

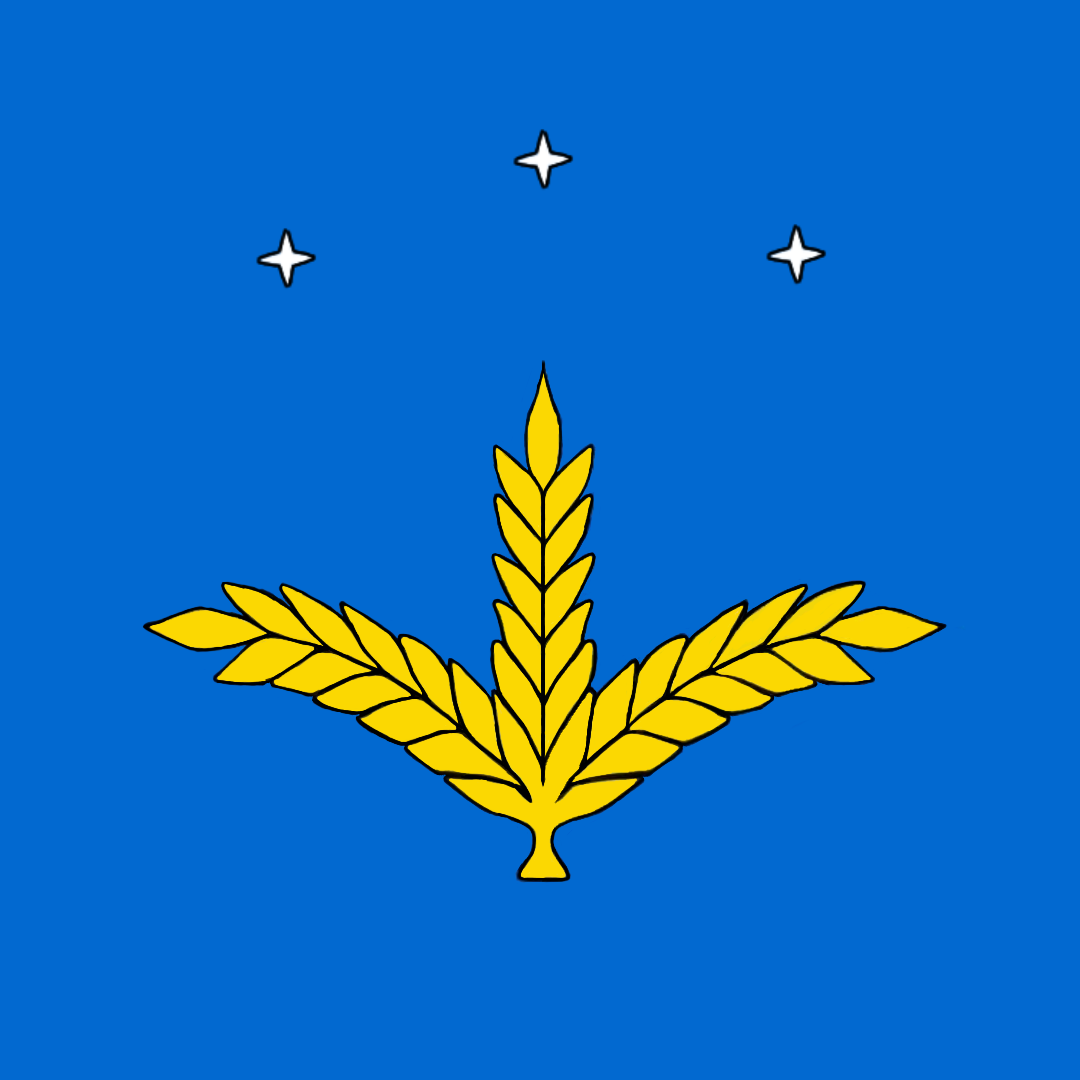
- Flag Coat of arms
- Interactive map of Kakhovka
- Location of Kakhovka Kakhovka (Ukraine)
- Coordinates: 46°47′52″N 33°28′30″E
- Country: Ukraine
- Oblast: Kherson Oblast
- Raion: Kakhovka Raion
- Hromada: Kakhovka urban hromada
- Founded: 1492

Government
  - Mayor: Pavlo Filipchuk (Russian-appointed)

Population (2022)
  - Total: ▼34,749
- Postal code: 74800
- Area code: +380 5536
- Climate: Dfa
- Website: http://www.kakhovka.ks.ua

Kakhovka (Ukrainian: Каховка, pronounced [kɐˈxɔu̯kɐ]) is a port city on the Dnieper River in Kakhovka Raion, Kherson Oblast, of southern Ukraine. It hosts the administration of the Kakhovka urban hromada, one of the hromadas of Ukraine. It had a population of 34,749 (2022 estimate). Kakhovka has been under Russian occupation since February 2022.

It is home to the KZEZO Electro-Welding Equipment Plant and the Tavria Games festival. Kakhovka gives its name to the Soviet-built Kakhovka Dam, which was destroyed in June 2023 during the Russian invasion of Ukraine, and the reservoir that had until then flooded the Great Meadow.

== Administrative status ==
In 1972, the Verkhovna Rada of the Ukrainian SSR gave the city the rank of city of oblast significance within Kherson Oblast. Until 18 July 2020, Kakhovka served as the administrative center of Kakhovka Raion though it did not belong to the raion. In July 2020, as part of the administrative reform of Ukraine, which reduced the number of raions of Kherson Oblast to five, the city of Kakhovka was merged into Kakhovka Raion. Simultaneously, the raion center was moved to Nova Kakhovka.

== History ==
Soon after the annexation of Crimea by the Russian Empire, in 1791 the Russian Colonel D.M. Kulikovsky built in place of former Crimean fortress the trade town of Kakhovka. It was named in honor of the Taurida Oblast governor Vasiliy Kakhovsky. In 1848 the town obtained city rights. In the 1870s–90s the town was renowned for having a huge population of low-income contractors (batraki). According to N.J. Tjezjakov, a Russian economist, between 20,000 and 40,000 batraki would gather in the city at the one time, 80% of them males. Before the revolution Kakhovka was an important centre of grain and wool trade.

In December 1918, by the decision of the administration of the Dnipro povit (uyezd), Kakhovka was declared a city. In August 1920, during the final push in the Russian Civil War to drive the Whites under Wrangel out of the Crimea, Ieronim Uborevich established a bridgehead as part of the Northern Taurida Operation at Kakhovka, which became the site of fierce battles, which Evan Mawdsley described as "probably the closest the Civil War came to world war trench fighting." Afterwards it was administratively part of the Mykolaiv Governorate of Ukraine.

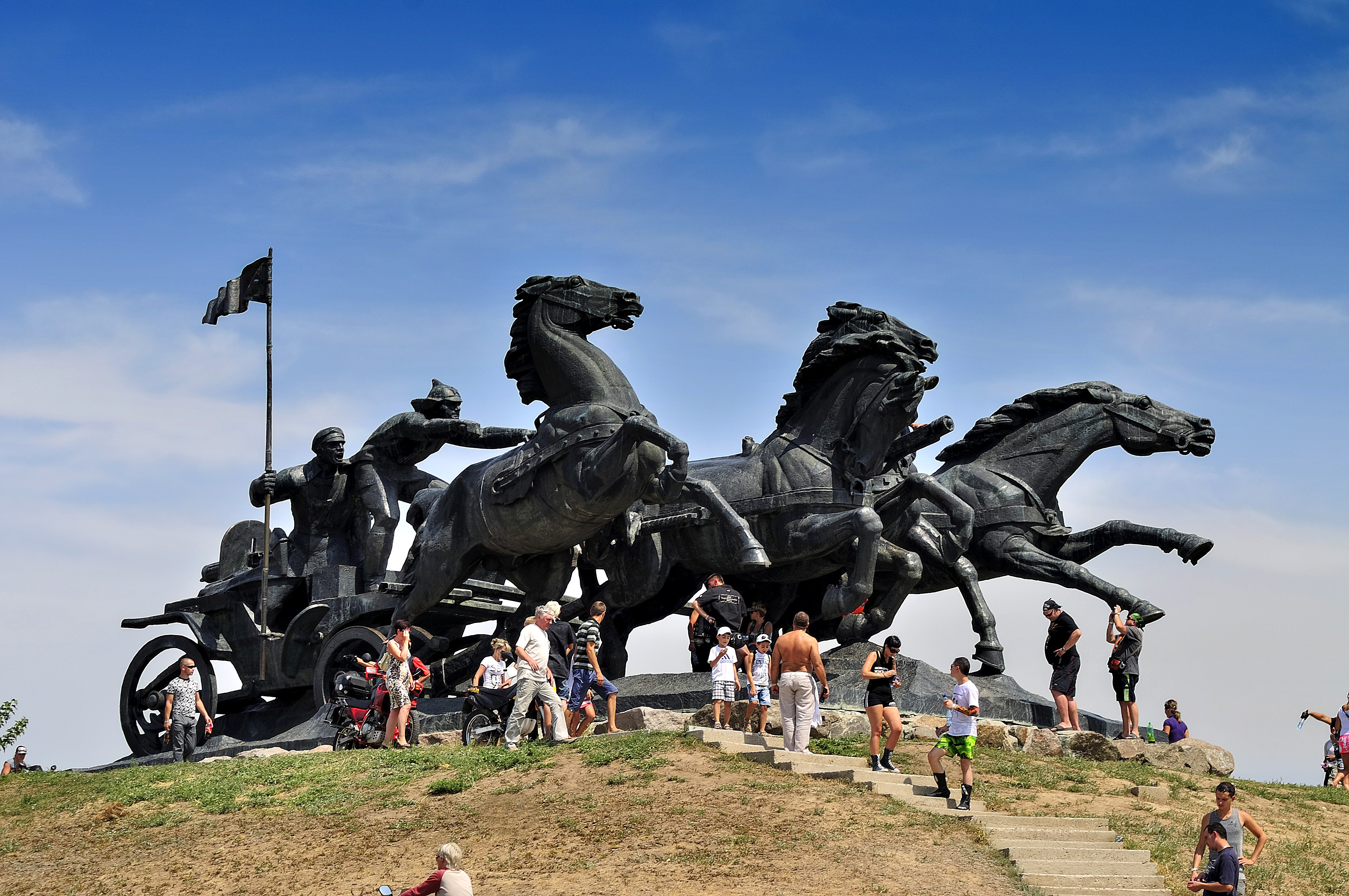
Tachanka monument

During World War II, Kakhovka was captured by the Wehrmacht on August 30, 1941, as part of Operation Barbarossa. The Germans operated a Nazi prison in the town. It was retaken by the 4th Ukrainian Front during the Melitopol Offensive in the Battle of the Dnieper on November 2, 1943.

The city was captured on 24 February 2022 by Russian troops during the 2022 Russian invasion of Ukraine. They later pushed on to Mykolaiv, searching for way to cross the Southern Bug river.

== City leaders ==
Date	Portrait	Name	Party	Notes
Chairman of the executive committee of the City Council				
January 1989 - August 1994		Anatoliy Korsun		
Chairman of the City Council				
September 1994 - April 1998		Viktor Semenovych Gashenko		
Mayor				
April 1998 - November 1998		Serhii Shkarupa		
January 1999 - November 1999 (first deputy and acting) April 2006		Leonid Marchuk		
April 2006 - October 2015		Oleksandr Petrovych Karasevych		
November 6, 2015 - October 26, 2020		Andrii Andriiovych Dyachenko		
November 21, 2020 - incumbent (de jure)		Vitalii Anatoliiovych Nemerets		
April 1, 2022		Pavlo Filipchuk		

== Economy ==
Today, Kakhovka is one of the industrial centres of the Kherson Oblast. The leader of industrial production is the Kakhovka Electric Welding Equipment Plant, a joint-stock company. Before the Russian occupation of the city in 2022, the plant produced modern electric welding equipment that was supplied to almost 80 countries, and on 24 December 2022, its premises were damaged by Russian mortar fire.

The industrial face of the city is also shaped by the Experimental Mechanical Plant, which specialises in the production of experimental machinery and equipment for the processing and food industries, the Silhospahrehat plant for the repair of diesel engines and the production of spare parts for agricultural machinery, and the flagship of the food industry, Chumak PrJSC.

The Kakhovka branch of Cargill is one of Ukraine's largest sunflower oil processing plants. In 2008-2009, Mykolaiv-based Sudnoservice built a powerful grain and oilseed storage facility in the city. The city ranks first in Ukraine in terms of foreign investment per capita.

In total, the city has more than 550 enterprises of various forms of ownership, including small businesses. This economic complex employs three quarters of the city's working population. In the total volume of production, works performed and services rendered, one fifth of the city's industrial enterprises, almost 60 per cent of small and medium-sized enterprises and businesses, about 10 per cent of service enterprises, more than 10 per cent of trade enterprises and more than 5 per cent of construction organisations contribute.

Small and medium-sized businesses are gaining ground in Kakhovka. It currently concentrates more than 60 per cent of its assets in working capital. This is three times more than large enterprises. Small and medium-sized businesses are developing dynamically, exploring the market space and creating jobs for the city's population.

Business structures annually attract over UAH 12 million and over USD 2 million in foreign investments to develop production. Such enterprises as Petroplast, Metaldizayn, Stav, Paritet, Tornadoplast, Globart, May, Khimtekhnologiya, and OPENTEK are consistently supplying the market with products, increasing their output and expanding their product range, the latter of which was destroyed by Russian bombardment on 18 October 2023. The construction industry is represented by business structures and construction organisations. The most powerful of them are the joint-stock company Road Construction Department No. 12 and BudMayster LLC.

== Demographics ==
Distribution of the population by ethnic groups according to the 2001 Ukrainian census:

Ethnic groups in Kakhovka
	percent
Ukrainians	82.10%
Russians	15.12%
Belarusians	0.68%
Gypsies	0.51%
Moldovans	0.24%
Bulgarians	0.18%
Tatars	0.17%
Poles	0.14%
Armenians	0.12%

Native languages according to the 2001 Ukrainian census:

Native languages in Kakhovka
	percent
Ukrainian	73.9%
Russian	25.3%
Others	0.8%

== Transport ==
The M14 (E58) Odesa-Melitopol-Novoazovsk motorway runs along the southern outskirts of the city.

The cargo and passenger railway station Kakhovka of the Kherson Railway Directorate is located near the town of Tavriysk.

== Education ==
There are 7 general secondary education institutions in the city (including two specialised ones with in-depth study of foreign languages) with almost 4,000 students.

More than 1,500 children are educated in eight pre-school institutions.

The out-of-school education system is represented by the Young Technicians' Station, the Young Naturalists' Station, the Children's Creativity Centre, the Children's and Youth Sports School and the Interschool Training and Production Complex.

Since 1969, the State Vocational Educational Institution "Kakhovka Vocational Lyceum of the Service Sector" has been operating in the city, training skilled workers in the professions of "Hairdresser", "Hairdresser-Makeup Artist", "Tailor", "Manicurist-Pedicurist". It ceased to exist in 2021.

== Cultural influence ==
The 1935 film Three Friends (Три товарища) included the song "Kakhovka" (words by Mikhail Svetlov and music by Isaak Dunayevsky), which became very well known, especially the refrain "Мы мирные люди, но наш бронепоезд/ Стоит на запасном пути" ("We are peaceful people, but our armored train/ Stands [ready] on the siding"). Svetlov chose the site of the little-known Civil War battle for his song because he had grown up nearby and had known the town during the war.

The Tavria Games are a popular open air music festival that take place in the town each year.

== Twin cities ==
- Olesnica, Poland
- Truskavets, Ukraine
- Gaziemir, Turkey

== Notable people ==
- Alexander Spendiaryan (1871–1928), composer, born in Kakhovka.
- Olia Hercules (born 1984), British-Ukrainian food writer, grew up in Kakhovka.
- Sergei Pankejeff (1886–1979), aristocrat from Odesa.
- Vladimir Virchis (1973–2022), Ukrainian professional boxer.
- Yuliia Starodubtseva (born 2000), WTA Tennis Player

== The following are named after Kakhovka ==
Kakhovka gives its name to the Soviet-built Kakhovka Dam, which was destroyed in June 2023, and the Kakhovka Reservoir that had existed behind the dam.

Kakhovka also gives its name to:

- the neighboring city of Nova Kakhovka
- villages in Mykolaiv district of Odesa Oblast, Sandyktaus district of Akmola oblast (liquidated in 2000), Shcherbaktyn district of Pavlodar Region (Kazakhstan), Malokakhovka village of Kakhovka district of Kherson region
- Kakhovka and Kakhovska streets in a number of settlements in the former Soviet Union
- Kakhovskyi lane/road/entrance in a number of Ukrainian cities
- Kakhovske highway in Melitopol
- the Kakhovka railway station of the Odesa railway in Kherson Oblast

Also, 2894 Kakhovka is an asteroid named after the town.
